= Barbourmeade, Kentucky =

- City
- Location of Barbourmeade in Jefferson County, Kentucky

- Location within the state of Kentucky Barbourmeade (the United States)
- Coordinates: 38°17′55″N 85°36′03″W
- Country: United States
- State: Kentucky
- County: Jefferson

Government
  - Type: Commission
  - Mayor: Bryan Coomer

Area
  - Total: 0.39 sq mi (1.02 km^{2})
  - Land: 0.39 sq mi (1.02 km^{2})
  - Water: 0 sq mi (0.00 km^{2})
- Elevation: 633 ft (193 m)

Population (2020)
  - Total: 1,216
  - Density: 3,077.3/sq mi (1,188.16/km^{2})
- Time zone: UTC-5 (Eastern (EST))
  - Summer (DST): UTC-4 (EDT)
- ZIP Code: 40241
- Area code: 502
- FIPS code: 21-03556
- GNIS feature ID: 2403154
- Website: barbourmeade.org

Barbourmeade is a home rule-class city in Jefferson County, Kentucky, United States. It was formally incorporated by the state assembly in 1962. The population was 1,216 as of the 2020 census, stagnant from 1,218 at the 2010 census.

The community derives its name from Thomas and Richard Barbour, early settlers for whom Barbour Lane is named. Barbourmeade incorporated as a city in October 1962, with a population of 150.

== History ==
Present-day Barbourmeade is part of the loosely defined historic community known as Springdale, after the farm that stood on the south side of Brownsboro Road beginning in 1830. Though it is not a formally recognized neighborhood or district within Louisville, nor does it have official boundaries, older businesses in the community still retain the Springdale name.

Barbour Lane, which runs through the middle of the community, was originally the entry drive to the Barbour house, which sat on the Barbour family's 500-acre tract of land between Brownsboro Road and River Road. The original Barbour house was destroyed in the 1974 tornado, which terminated near Barbour Lane.

The intersection of present-day Barbour Lane and Brownsboro Road, then a toll road known as the Louisville-Brownsboro Turnpike, was the location of the tollhouse. On the north side of the road, there was a gristmill, grocery and blacksmith shop as far back as 1879, as well as a tavern known as the Seven Mile House for its location from downtown Louisville. Springdale Presbyterian Church, across the street, was established in 1882, with much of its present-day structure constructed in 1964. The intersection of Barbour Lane and what was then known as Old Brownsboro Road was zoned for commercial use in 1943, after which time a Sun Oil Company service station was built. A small neighborhood shopping center was built on the adjacent lot in 1966, and remains a commercial hub for the immediate community, serviced over the years by a convenience store and gas station, dry cleaner, animal hospital and automotive shop. A series of liquor stores have also been located at the intersection since three local businessmen opened one in 1978 in the old Sunoco station, refurbishing the floor with wood from reclaimed from the rollerskating rink at Fontaine Ferry Park. The store's opening was met with considerable protest from members of the community and a multi-year series of zoning disputes and lawsuits ensued.

Beginning in the late 19th century until it was subdivided in the 1950s, much of present-day Barbourmeade and the surrounding portions of Louisville's East End were occupied by potato farms. Farmers from the area were instrumental in organizing the St. Matthews Produce Exchange, the second-largest potato shipper in the country, located in nearby St. Matthews, known locally as "the potato capital of the world." Among these farmers was Fred "The Potato King" Stutzenberger Sr., said at the time to be "one of Jefferson County's best known-farmers," and whose family farm occupied a large portion of present-day Barbourmeade. The area was described in 1941 as home to "Jefferson County's most fertile land and least experienced farmers," owing to the influx of wealthy hobby farmers from the city. A farmhouse facing Brownsboro Road built by the Schneider family, who operated a truck farm on the site, is one of the few pre-World War II buildings remaining in Barbourmeade.

After World War II, potato production in the area declined and farm acreages in Springdale and along Brownsboro Road were reduced or sold off. The Barbourmeade subdivision was platted from the farmland. As with many suburban developments of the era, the street names are a mix of Italian and Spanish language-derived place names (Sorrento, Coronado, Pompano), plants and animals (Nandina, Foxglove, Pipilo), former place markers and geographic features of the land (Pine Ridge, Old Gate) and names of the developers' family and colleagues (Breeland, Dinah). The suffix "-meade" derives from a poetic variation on the Old English word "mead," referring to a meadow or pasture. The first new single-family home constructions went on the market in 1953. The housing stock consists of a variety of popular postwar styles, including Colonial Revival, ranch-style, split-levels and Cape Cods. Along with nearby Plantation, Barbourmeade was one of the earliest residential developments in the area.

To accommodate the growing population in the area, Jefferson County Public Schools opened Norton Elementary School in 1967. The school is named for WAVE founder and president George Norton Jr. and philanthropist and artist Jane Norton, who lived on nearby Wolf Pen Branch Road.

In 1988, the city commission disbanded the Barbourmeade police department for budgetary reasons. The Barbourmeade police department also provided police services for Brownsboro Farm, Ten Broeck, Langdon Place and Rolling Hills. Barbourmeade has been served by the Graymoor-Devondale Police Department since 2011.

In 1999, Barbourmeade annexed the neighboring community of Brownsboro Gardens after a protracted legal battle with Louisville-Jefferson County relating to a metro-wide ban on annexations.

== Geography ==
Barbourmeade is located in northeastern Jefferson County. It is bordered to the northeast by Brownsboro Farm, to the southeast by Manor Creek, Broeck Pointe and Goose Creek, to the west by Spring Valley, and to the north, east, and south by Louisville. Interstate 71 runs along the northern border of Barbourmeade (but with no direct access), and Kentucky Route 22 (Brownsboro Road) forms part of the southern border. Downtown Louisville is 10 miles (16 km) to the southwest, and Crestwood is 8 miles (13 km) to the northeast up Route 22.

According to the United States Census Bureau, Barbourmeade has a total area of 0.39 square miles (1.02 km^{2}), all land.

Barbourmeade is informally separated into three sections. The Hillvale section, located southwest of Barbour Lane, is named for the road. The Norton section, located on the northeast side of Barbour Lane, is named for the elementary school. The Brownsboro Vista section is on the southeastern side of Highway 22, and is named for the road. The Brownsboro Vista section is the former Brownsboro Gardens subdivision, annexed in 1999.

== Demographics ==
Historical population
Census	Pop.	Note	%±
1970	884		—
1980	1,038		17.4%
1990	1,402		35.1%
2000	1,260		−10.1%
2010	1,218		−3.3%
2020	1,216		−0.2%
U.S. Decennial Census

As of the census of 2000, there were 1,260 people, 506 households, and 400 families residing in the city. The population density was 2,908.7 inhabitants per square mile (1,123.1/km^{2}). There were 516 housing units at an average density of 1,191.2 per square mile (459.9/km^{2}). The racial makeup of the city was 95.87% White, 2.38% Black or African American, 0.95% Asian, 0.08% from other races, and 0.71% from two or more races. Hispanic or Latino of any race were 0.63% of the population.

There were 506 households, out of which 30.4% had children under the age of 18 living with them, 72.7% were married couples living together, 5.1% had a female householder with no husband present, and 20.8% were non-families. 18.8% of all households were made up of individuals, and 9.3% had someone living alone who was 65 years of age or older. The average household size was 2.49 and the average family size was 2.84.

In the city, the population was spread out, with 22.8% under the age of 18, 3.3% from 18 to 24, 19.8% from 25 to 44, 33.7% from 45 to 64, and 20.4% who were 65 years of age or older. The median age was 48 years. For every 100 females, there were 92.1 males. For every 100 females age 18 and over, there were 90.0 males.

The median income for a household in the city was $71,711, and the median income for a family was $78,414. Males had a median income of $56,563 versus $36,458 for females. The per capita income for the city was $32,865. About 0.5% of families and 0.8% of the population were below the poverty line, including none of those under the age of eighteen or sixty-five or over.

== Arts and culture ==
Omnicron Records, a small record label, was based in Barbourmeade in the mid-1990s. Their releases included the debut album by Hotel Roy, the first commercially available recordings of future My Morning Jacket frontman Jim James.

== Notable people ==
Former basketball player and coach Wade Houston and his son, professional basketball player Allan Houston, lived in Barbourmeade from 1986 to 1989 while the younger Houston attended nearby Ballard High School.

Attorney and judge William E. McAnulty Jr., the first African American justice on the Kentucky Supreme Court, was a Barbourmeade resident in the 1980s.

== Transportation ==
The intersection of Barbour Lane and Brownsboro Road, where the tollhouse was located, was a longtime way station between downtown Louisville and the farmlands and country homes of Oldham County, as evidenced by the presence of businesses catering to travelers well into the early automotive era. The hilly terrain and sharp turns on Brownsboro Road crossing Goose Creek to the west of the area make the intersection a natural stopping point on the landscape. In 1913, this section of Brownsboro Road was described in the Courier-Journal as a "highway for successful farmers," extolling it as critical link between the city and farmlands that produced fruit and vegetables for Louisville markets. A Louisville and Interurban Railroad line serving the area was planned in the early 1910s, but never came to fruition.

Barbourmeade has been described as a typical "car suburb," with easy access to Interstates 71 and 264 being a primary selling point to car commuters. The neighborhood has not been directly served by public transit since the late 1990s, when the portion of TARC Route 15 between Holiday Manor Shopping Center and Standard Country Club was eliminated.

On April 3, 2015, heavy rains washed away an old stone culvert over Goose Creek, just west of Barbourmeade, causing a cave-in on Brownsboro Road and cutting off the city from Interstates 71 and 264, and commercial centers located to the west. The road was reopened after five months.

Within the city, pedestrians, cyclists and automobiles share the roads. In the absence of sidewalks, pedestrians generally walk on the streets facing traffic. In 2006, Barbourmeade received a Safe Routes to School grant from the state of Kentucky to upgrade pedestrian facilities for students walking and biking to Norton Elementary. Portions of Pompano Drive and Sorrento Avenue near the school are marked with pedestrian crossings and shared on-street pedestrian paths on the shoulders.

== See also ==
- Springdale
- Kentucky Route 22 / Brownsboro Road
