= Springdale, Louisville =

Neighborhood in Louisville, Kentucky

Coordinates: 38°17′42″N 85°36′06″W

Springdale is a neighborhood in Louisville, Kentucky located along Brownsboro Road and Barbour Lane. The community is named for the family farm purchased by Laurence Young and his family in 1830, which was intersected by present-day Brownsboro Road, with the estate on the south side of the road. The Young family's Springdale farm today is the site of the Standard Country Club, as well as portions of Barbourmeade, Goose Creek and Brownsboro Farm. Though it is not a formally recognized neighborhood or district within Louisville, nor does it have official boundaries, older businesses and institutions in the community still retain the Springdale name, and the name was used to refer to the area until it was subdivided in the 1950s and '60s.
