= Request stop =

Type of transport stop

A comparison showing the difference between a normal bus stop and a request stop in London. This distinction is obsolete since 2008.

In public transport, a request stop, flag stop, or whistle stop is a stop or station at which buses or trains, respectively, stop only on request; that is, only if there are passengers or freight to be picked up or dropped off. In this way, stops with low passenger counts can be incorporated into a route without introducing unnecessary delay. Vehicles may also save fuel by continuing through a station when there is no need to stop.

"Flag stop" airline service was historically offered by several scheduled passenger air carriers in the past into destinations with low airline passenger demand. As an example, in its June 1, 1969, worldwide system timetable, Pan American World Airways (Pan Am) had this explanation: "Flag stop: A stop will be made and traffic will be accepted only when operating conditions permit, and provided request to stop is made sufficiently in advance."

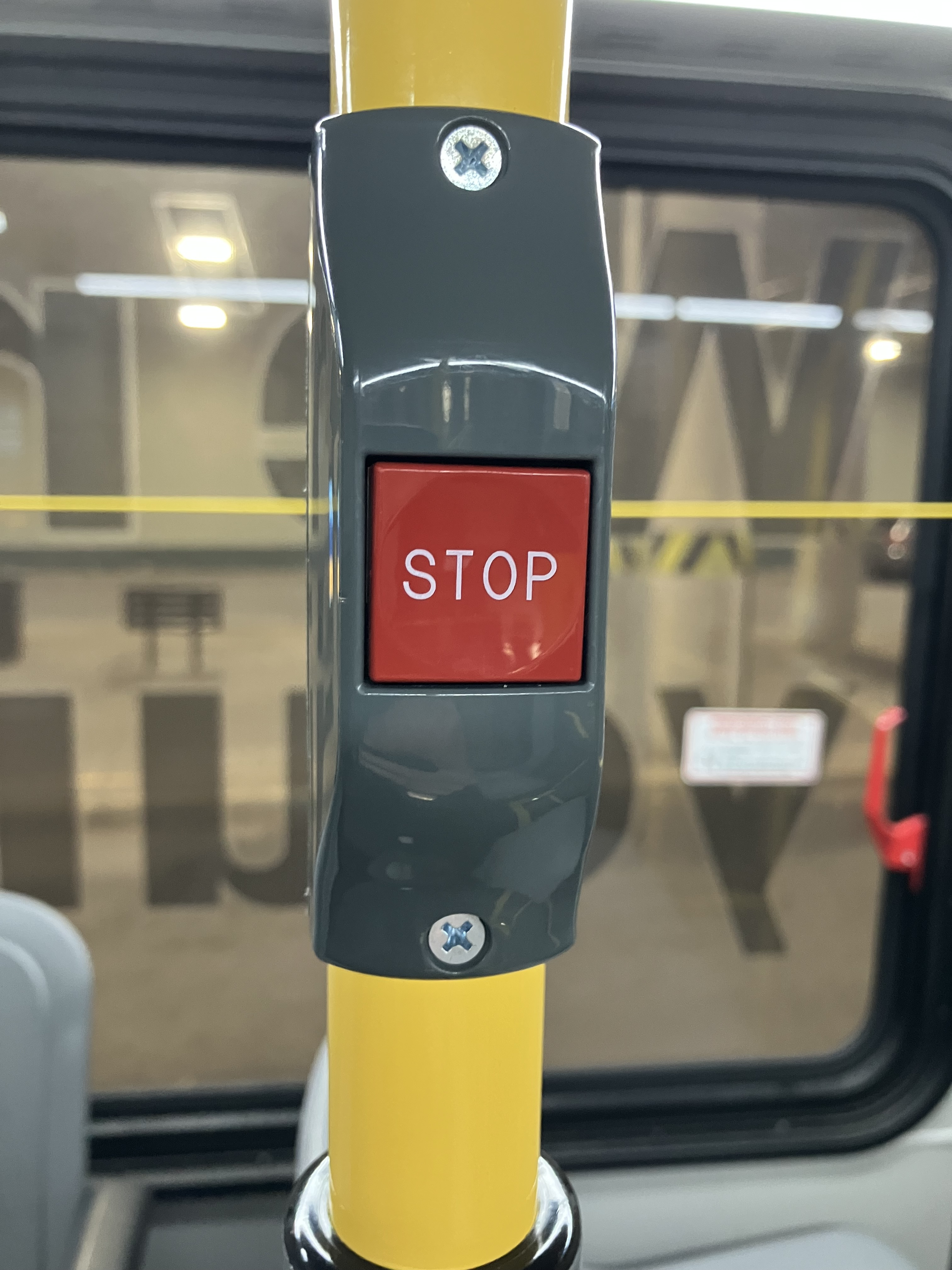
A request stop button on a city bus operated by Niagara Transit. Stops are requested by pressing the button

There may not always be significant savings on time if there is no one to pick up because vehicles going past a request stop may need to slow down enough to be able to stop if there are passengers waiting. Request stops may also introduce extra travel time variability and increase the need for schedule padding.

The appearance of request stops varies greatly. Many are clearly signed, but many others rely on local knowledge.

== Implementations ==
The methods by which transit vehicles are notified that there are passengers waiting to be picked up at a request stop vary by transit system and by route.

=== Local transport ===
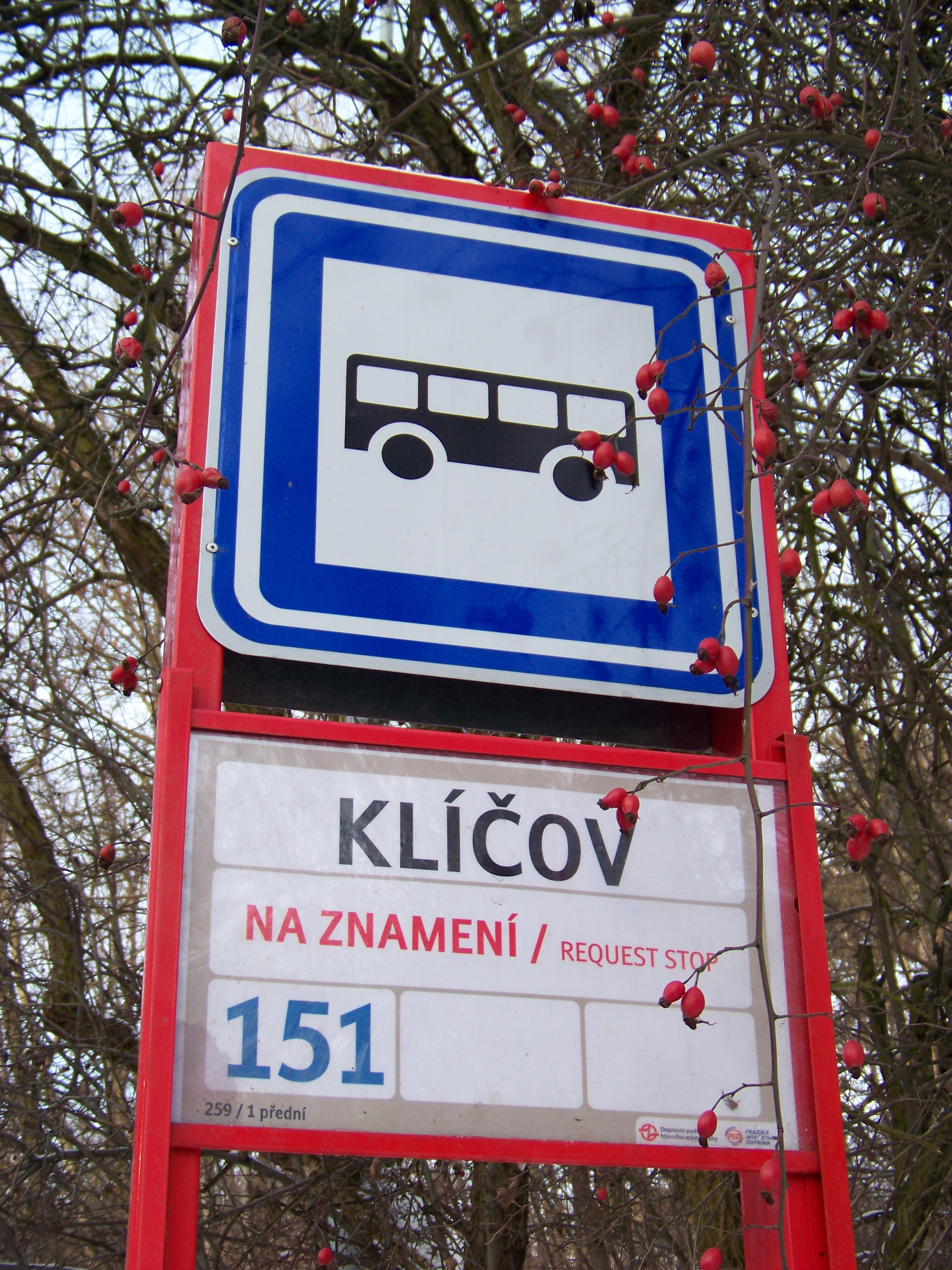
A request stop (zastávka na znamení) on Prague city bus line 151

Many local bus and tram systems operate most of their stops as request stops. Buses and trams do not service stops unless there is an awaiting passenger or an onboard passenger utilizes an electric bell to signal a stop (generally by pulling a cord, or pushing a button or yellow signaling strip). Stops that are served on every trip are often called stations and placed at the terminus of a route. Such stops are often also used as timing points. In contrast, light rail and bus rapid transit services will typically stop at all stations regardless.

However, some systems use this term to distinguish between marked stops that must be hailed (as if hailing a taxicab) and marked stops where the driver will stop for any awaiting passengers (as above). This practice was common on certain Transport for London routes until 2008, with different signs distinguishing between the two sorts of stops.

Still other systems may use the term "request stop" to refer to a servicing location other than a marked bus stop. This sort of service can be found on hail and ride routes, designated portions of routes, or special late-night service. In hail and ride operations, there are few or no marked stops and passengers can request the bus be stopped at any point where the driver can safely and reasonably do so. This is common in some cities, such as Tulsa, Oklahoma, United States, where bus stops were infrequently signed before 2019. Some services operate in this way only late at night, allowing for drop-off between marked stops, thereby decreasing walking time for safety and convenience. Examples include Winnipeg Transit and New York City MTA Bus (known as Late-night Request-A-Stop).

=== Long-distance transport ===
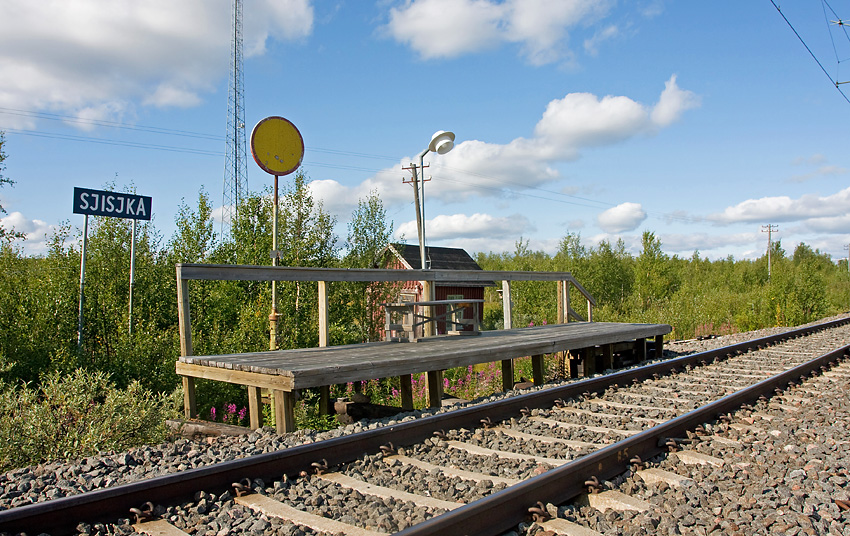
The Sjisjka stop on the Inland Line in Lapland with the traditional round, yellow sign that is to be turned towards the arriving train

In long-distance transport, transit vehicles, such as passenger trains or buses operating on motorways, usually operate at higher speeds than local transport. This means that stopping is more troublesome (and more worth avoiding) and that it may be very difficult to see a passenger in time to stop for them. This difference often results in more complicated ways of signalling a stop to the vehicle.

Some services, like Amtrak, require that a ticket be purchased in advance, specifying a specific origin and destination. Since the train's crew know what tickets were sold, they also know where people are coming from and going to, and they simply stop only at those stations required by the tickets. Services that lack advance ticketing, or that sell tickets for a range of destinations or travel times, require ways of knowing whether or not someone is waiting at a station or platform. These may range from a passenger speaking to a dispatcher on a phone located at a station or to a station employee to simply pressing a button to activate a signal such as a flashing light somewhere before the station that the driver can see in time to slow down safely.

In the United Kingdom, there are approximately 100 railway request stops. When leaving from a request stop, the passenger has to signal the train driver by hand signal. When planning to disembark at a request stop, the passenger needs to inform the train conductor in advance. Some request stops in Scotland, eight on the Far North Line, have had a ‘Request to Stop’ kiosk installed at the station. This has live information for passengers and a button that can be pressed to alert the driver of their intent to board the train before it arrives in view from the platforms. This alerts the driver about any waiting passengers in advance; if there is no requirement to stop, the train can maintain line speed through the station, thus improving reliability on the whole line. On 15 August 2022, Scotscalder station became the trial site for a "Press & Ride" request stop system developed by Transport Scotland. Following the successful trial at Scotscalder, this system was expanded on 20 December 2022 to cover five more request stops on the line, namely Culrain, Invershin, Rogart, Kildonan and Kinbrace. The last two kiosks, at Dunrobin Castle and Altnabreac, are expected to be in operation from spring 2023.

=== Ferries ===
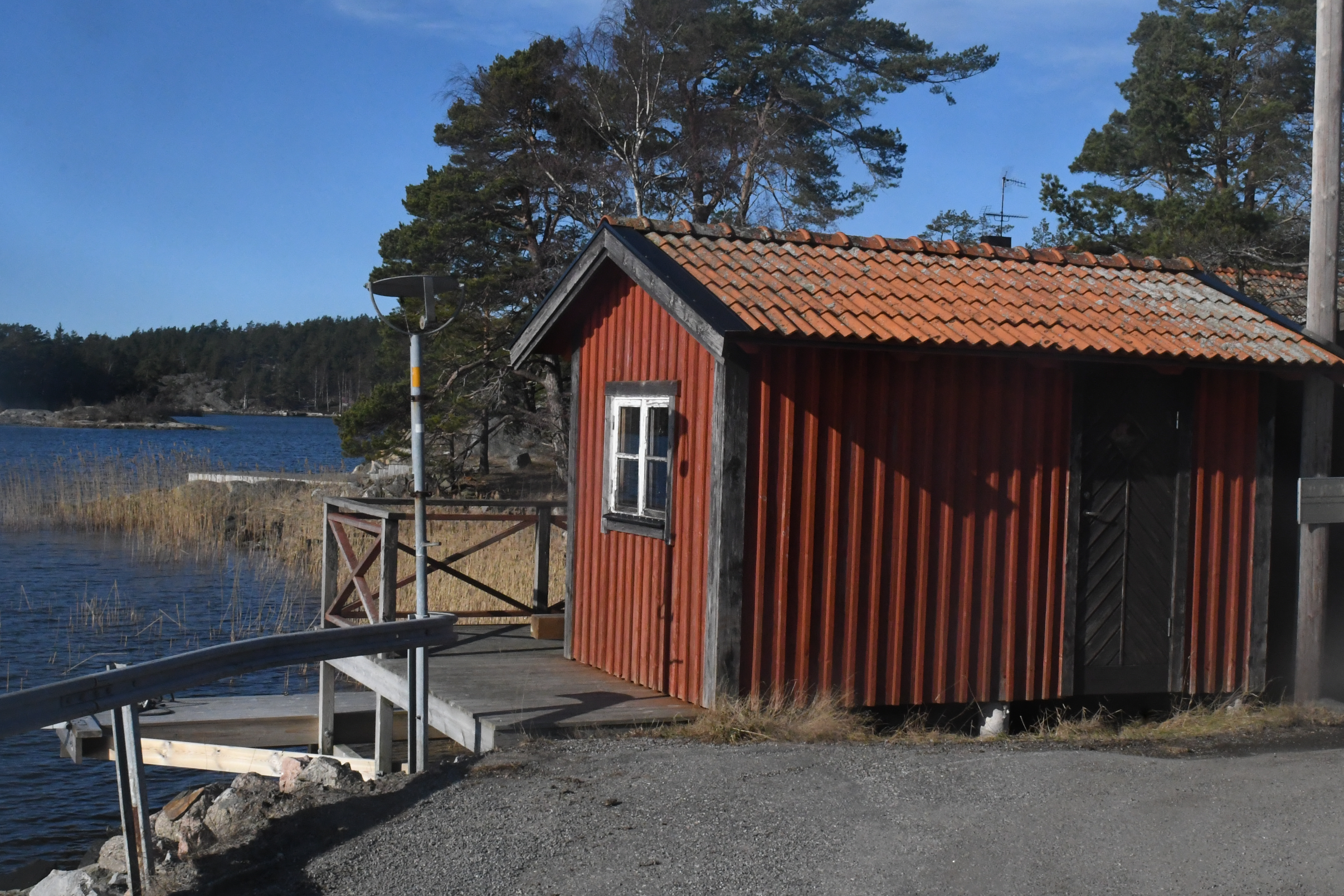
A semaphore at a jetty in Stockholm archipelago

Along some ferry routes in the fjords in Norway, some stops are equipped with a light that embarking passengers must switch on in order for the ferry to include the stop and pick them up. The system is known under the name signalanløp. Similar to Norway, in Sweden commuter ferries are requested to stop by a semaphore signal. The many islands of the Stockholm archipelago are an example of this.

== See also ==
- Halt
- Hail and ride
