= Low-floor bus =

Bus with no steps between the ground and the interior

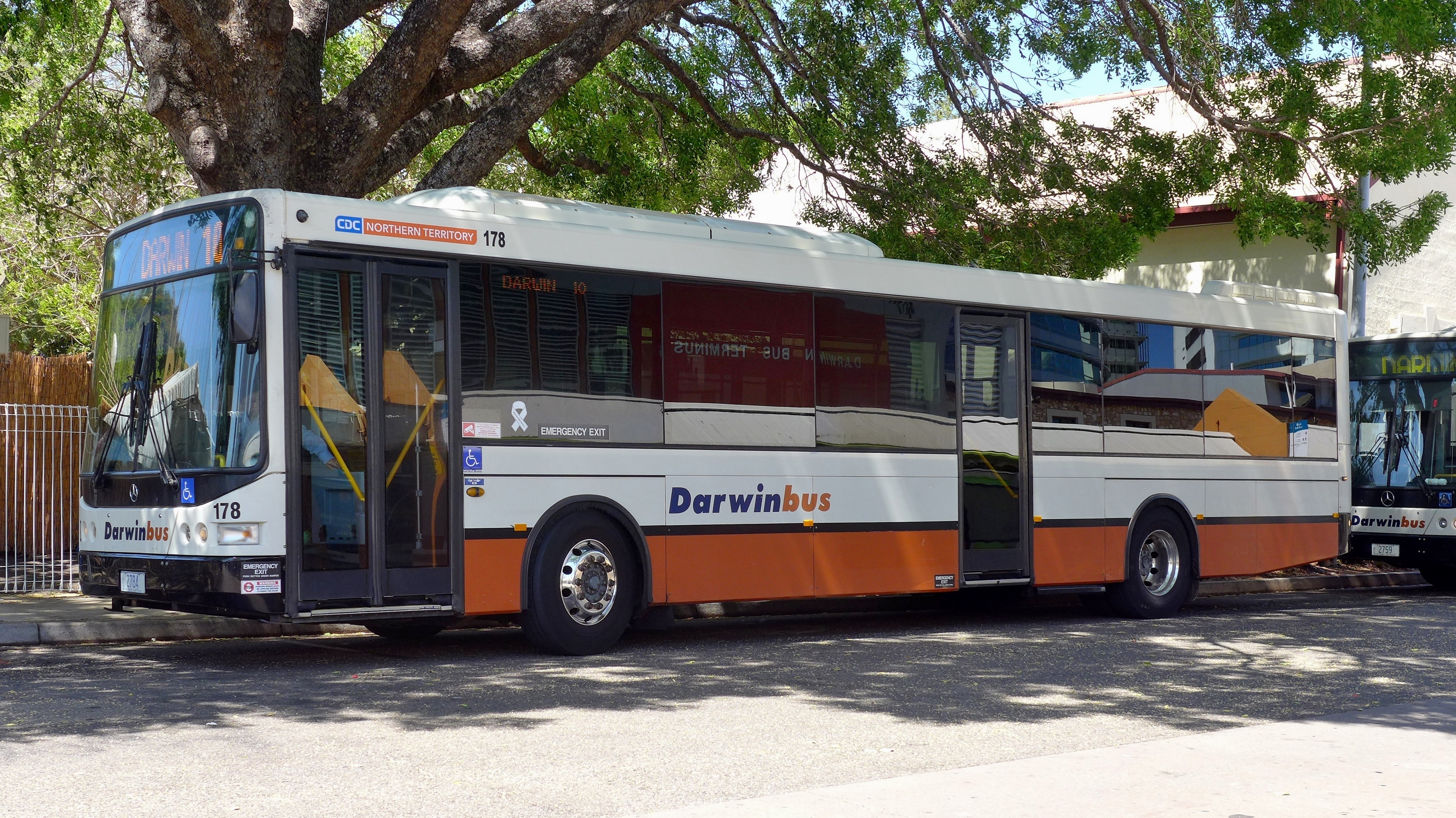
A low-entry bus of Volgren CR228L bodied Mercedes-Benz OC500LE in Darwin, Australia

A low-floor bus is a bus or trolleybus that has no steps between the ground and the floor of the bus at one or more entrances, and low floor for part or all of the passenger cabin. A bus with a partial low floor may also be referred to as a low-entry bus or seldom a flat-floor bus in some locations.

Low floor refers to a bus deck that is accessible from the sidewalk with only a single step with a small height difference, caused solely by the difference between the bus deck and sidewalk. This is distinct from high-floor, a bus deck design that requires climbing one or more steps (now known as step entrance) to access the interior floor that is placed at a higher height. Being low-floor improves the accessibility of the bus for the public, particularly the elderly and people with disabilities, including those using wheelchairs and walkers. Almost all are rear-engine, rear-wheel-drive layout.

== Configuration ==
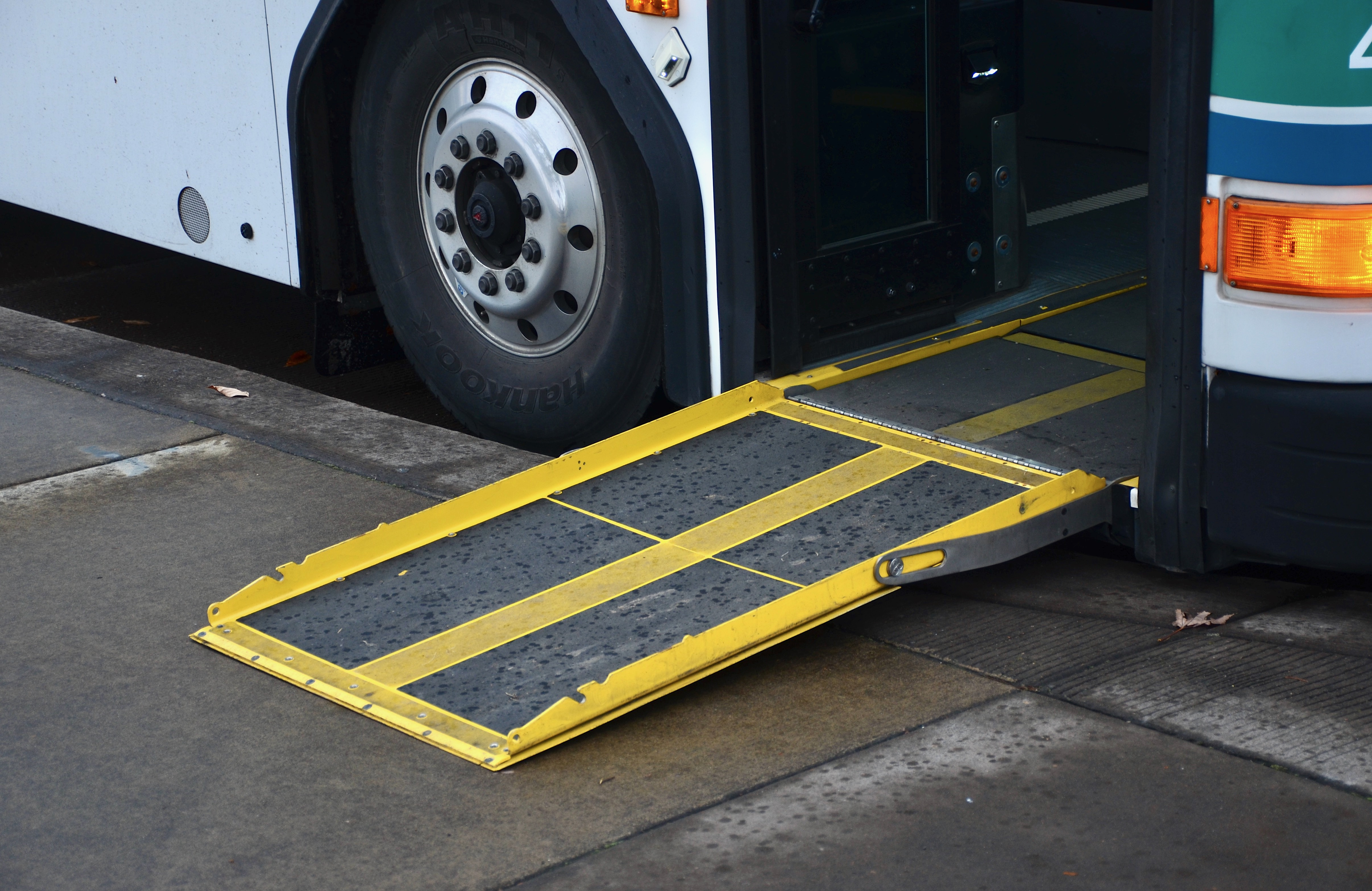
Many low-floor buses feature extendable ramps.

=== Low-floor and low-entry buses ===
Low-floor buses are generally divided into two major types: fully low-floor buses with a low floor throughout the length of the bus (more popular in Europe), and low-entry buses with step-free access to only a part of the bus, most commonly between the front door and the middle door (more popular in North America). In North America, both types are commonly called low-floor, as the majority of the vehicle has a low floor, without steps at the doors.

The main reason for choosing a low-entry configuration is to allow better placement for the powertrain and other technical equipment in the raised floor section, in addition to allowing a more comfortable ride on rough roads. Some manufacturers use the initials LF or L in their model designations for fully low-floor models (or in the case of German manufacturers, NF or N, based on the German word Niederflur, which means low floor), and in North America buses that are partially low-floor are often also designated LF. In some countries, LE, short for Low Entry, is used by some manufacturers in their model designations for low-entry buses.

=== Suspension and powertrain ===
Kneeling bus raising the floor before departure

Most bus manufacturers achieve a low floor height by making rear-engined rear-wheel drive buses with independent front suspension, so that no axle is needed to pass under the floor of the front part of passenger compartment, or a lowered front axle. Some full low-floor buses also have a lowered rear axle, while the rear axle is not an issue on a low-entry bus.

Many low-floor buses, including the Irisbus Citelis (also in Skoda 24Tr trolleybus version), have the engine in a vertical cabinet at the rear of the bus. Van Hool have a series of "side-engine mid-drive" buses that puts the engine off to one side of the cabin longitudinally between the first and the second axle, to maximize usable cabin space. The same concept was also utilized by Volvo on their B9S articulated chassis.

For smaller buses, such as midibuses, the low-floor capability is achieved by placing the front wheels ahead of the entrance. One of the last types of buses to gain low-floor accessibility as standard was the minibus, where a similar front-wheel arrangement allows around 12 seats and a wheelchair space to be accommodated in very small low-floor minibuses, such as the Optare Alero and Hino Poncho. Accessibility was previously achieved in paratransit type applications, which use small vehicles with the fitment of special lifts. The inception of small low-floor buses has allowed the development of several accessible demand-responsive transport schemes using standard 'off-the-shelf' buses.

A disadvantage of the low floor is accommodating the bus's own wheels. With the low floor, the wheels protrude into the passenger cabin, and need to be contained in wheel pockets of waist height, and this occupies space which would otherwise be used for seating. To allow space for technical equipment, many low-floor buses have the seats mounted on podiums, making a small step up from the floor, while others are able to mount the seats directly to the floor, avoiding the step. Seating layout for a low-floor bus therefore requires careful design. Low floor configuration is also known to have poor side to side dead load distribution within the chassis due to the asymmetrical off-centre placement of driveline components - mainly engine and transmission. As a result, many of such buses require electronically controlled air suspension to compensate the lopsided configuration.

=== Other features ===
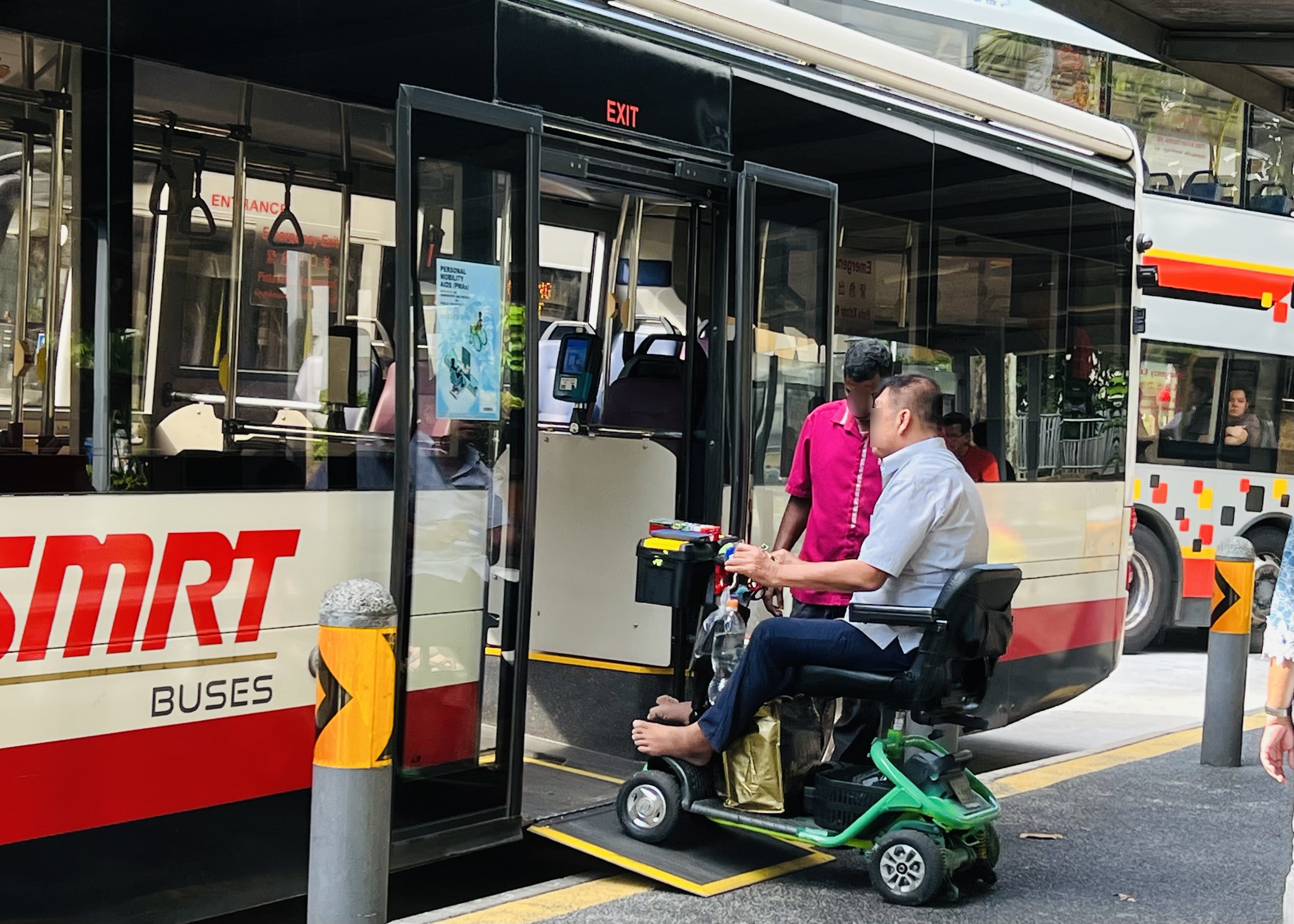
A low-floor bus can provide accessibility for wheelchair users and those on personal mobility devices, often through the use of a wheelchair ramp.

Low-floor buses usually include an area without seating (or seating that folds up) next to at least one of the doors, where wheelchairs, walkers, strollers/prams, and where allowed even bicycles, can be parked. This is sometimes not the only purpose of this area, though, as many operators employ larger standee areas for high occupancy at peak times. Despite the space existing, operators may also insist that only one or two wheelchairs or pushchairs can be accommodated unfolded, due to space/safety concerns.

Low floors can be complemented by a hydraulic or pneumatic 'kneeling device', which can be used when the bus is not in motion, tilting it or lowering it at the front axle even further, often down to normal curb height. Depending on how close to the curb the bus is parked and wheelchair design, this can allow wheelchair users to board unaided. Though such technology has been available and in use on high-floor buses since the 1970s, it is of significant utility on low-floor vehicles only where it enables less-mobile passengers to board and leave the vehicle without help from others. Many vehicles are also equipped with wheel-chair lifts, or ramps which, when combined with a low floor, can provide a nearly level entry.

An implementation of the low floor design exists in Australia where custom coaches make a "hybrid" variant of its CB60 bodywork. These buses combine a smaller low floor area with a small underfloor bin for some luggage. Whilst these buses do not provide a full amount of luggage space, they can be used to house more luggage than what can be held inside the bus itself. Another drawback is the arrangement means the section of the bus that is at curb height is very short—consisting of enough space to house the wheelchair area and then rising up, to accommodate the luggage bin. These buses also lack the ability to have a center door.

== Alternatives ==
Many bus rapid transit systems employ a level boarding by using high-floor buses stopping at "station" style bus stops. Specially raised sections of curb may also be used to achieve accessibility with lesser low floor models, although this is more expensive for the operator, and only attractive for regular busy scheduled routes. For infrequent routes or routes with hail and ride sections, or demand responsive transport, raised curbs would only be feasible in terminuses.

== Asia ==
=== India ===
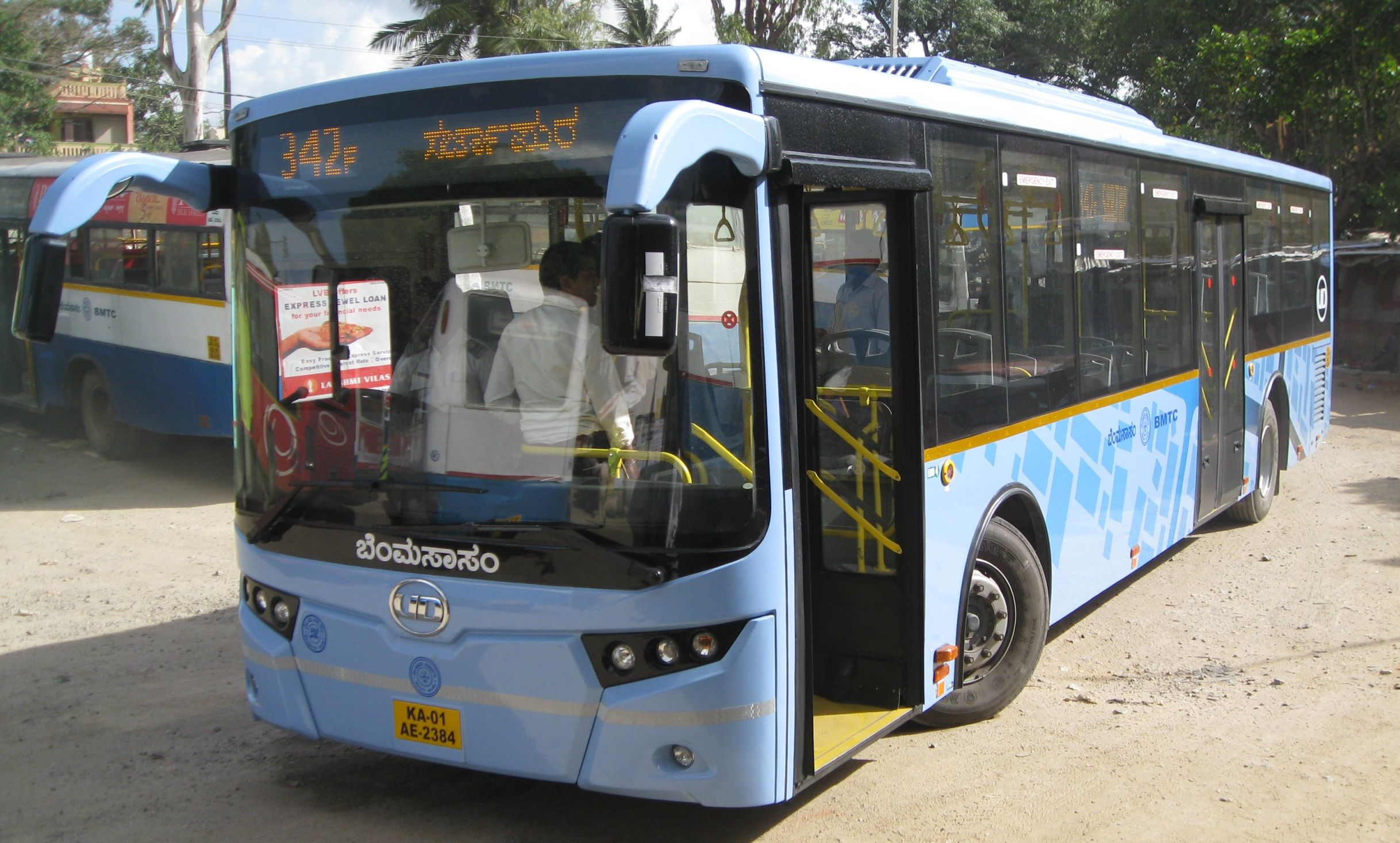
A BMTC UD SLF bus

==== Bengaluru ====
Bengaluru is one of the first cities in India that introduced Low Floor buses. The Bengaluru Metropolitan Transport Corporation (BMTC) operates many services using the premium Volvo 8400LE Low-floor buses. These buses are air-conditioned, and offer features such as automatic transmission, kneeling and wheel-chair ramp, typical of modern city buses. They are also fitted with LED display boards as well as ITS to announce the halts. The corporation also had tried Mercedes-Benz Low-Floor buses as well as Ashok Leyland ULE coaches, but chose to stick to the Volvo offering.

In order to keep the bus ticket prices low, the BMTC operates the majority of their services using Non-Airconditioned Semi-Low Floor (SLF) buses that have a floor height of 650mm as against the 400mm floor height of the true Low-Floor buses. These buses are from Ashok Leyland and Tata Motors, with future procurements planned to be from Eicher (VECV). These cheaper alternative to low-floor buses do not have kneeling or wheel-chair accessible ramps, but they have air suspension and use the same or better seats as those found in the Volvo buses. They also feature manual transmission as against automatic transmission

==== New Delhi ====
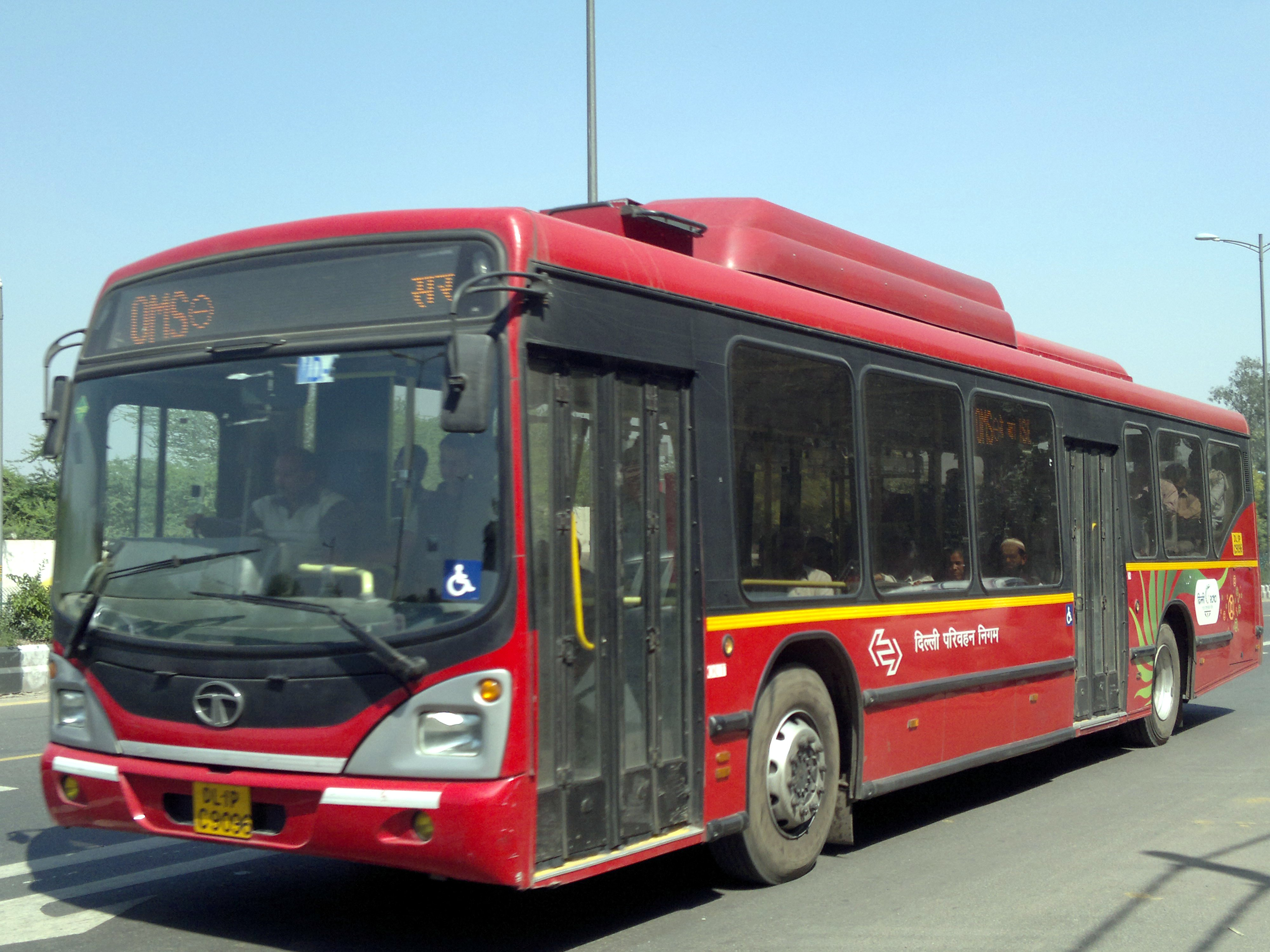
Low floor old Buses in Delhi

With the introduction of Bus Rapid Transit (BRT) and the development of dedicated corridors for the service, bus service is set to improve. The Delhi Transport Corporation (DTC) has started introducing air-conditioned buses and brand new low-floor buses (with floor height of 400 mm (15.75 in) and even higher on one third area as against 230 mm (9.06 in) available internationally) on city streets to replace the conventional buses. A revamp plan is underway to improve bus-shelters in the city and to integrate GPS systems in DTC buses and bus stops so as to provide reliable information about bus arrivals. The Delhi Government decided to expedite this process and procured 6,600 low floor buses for the DTC before commonwealth games in 2010.

==== Kolkata ====
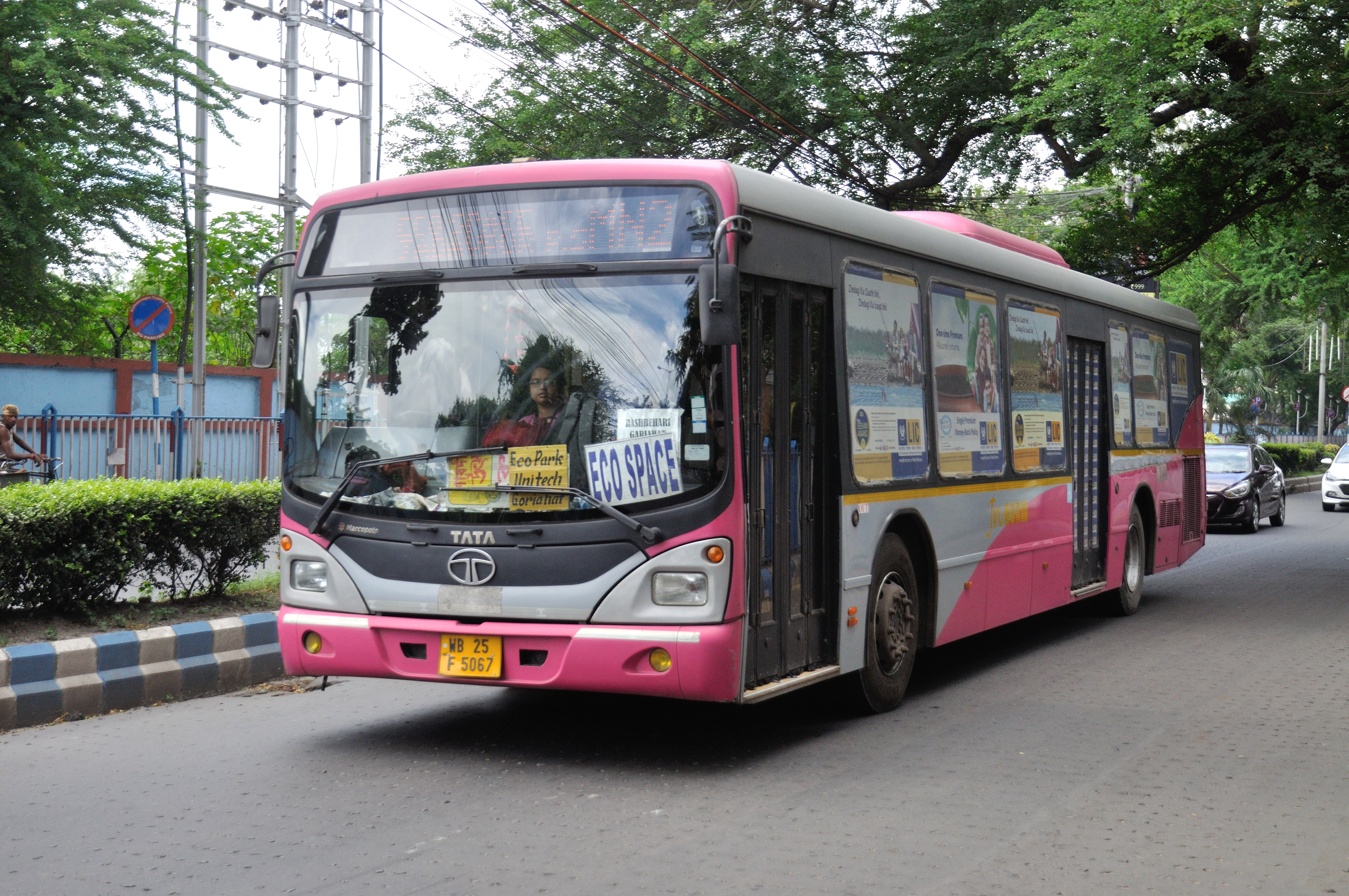
A Low floor Bus in Kolkata

Kolkata has an extensive network of government run buses. Recently air-conditioned buses have been introduced by the WBSTC. These buses connects places like the Kolkata Airport, Barasat (Capital Town of North Suburb), New Town, Salt Lake, Howrah, Santragachi (a station on the Howrah-Kharagpur railway line), Kudghat and Tollygunge. The road network in Kolkata is vast. Under Jawaharlal Nehru National Urban Renewal Mission, air conditioned buses have been included as a part of travel comfort to commuters. Air-conditioned buses are operated by West Bengal Surface Transport Corporation (WBSTC) directly & through outsourcing. These buses are served by Tata Marcopolo Buses and Volvo Low Floor Buses. The V Series and VS series bus routes are served by the AC volvo bus and MW series are served by the Tata Marcopolo buses operated by WBSTC. AC Marcopolo buses serve the MH series route operated by WBHIDCO and the MB series route operated by BHBL. Calcutta State Transport Corporation (CSTC) also run AC Volvo Bus & Ashok Leylan JanBus.

==== Jaipur (Jaipur) ====
- Non-AC : Several Non-AC buses are available across the city. There are 10 routes.7 are radial and 10 are circular
- AC: There are six AC routes buses namely AC-1, AC-2, AC-3, AC-5, AC-6 and AC-7. JCTSL operates buses from Ashok Leyland and Tata

=== Japan ===
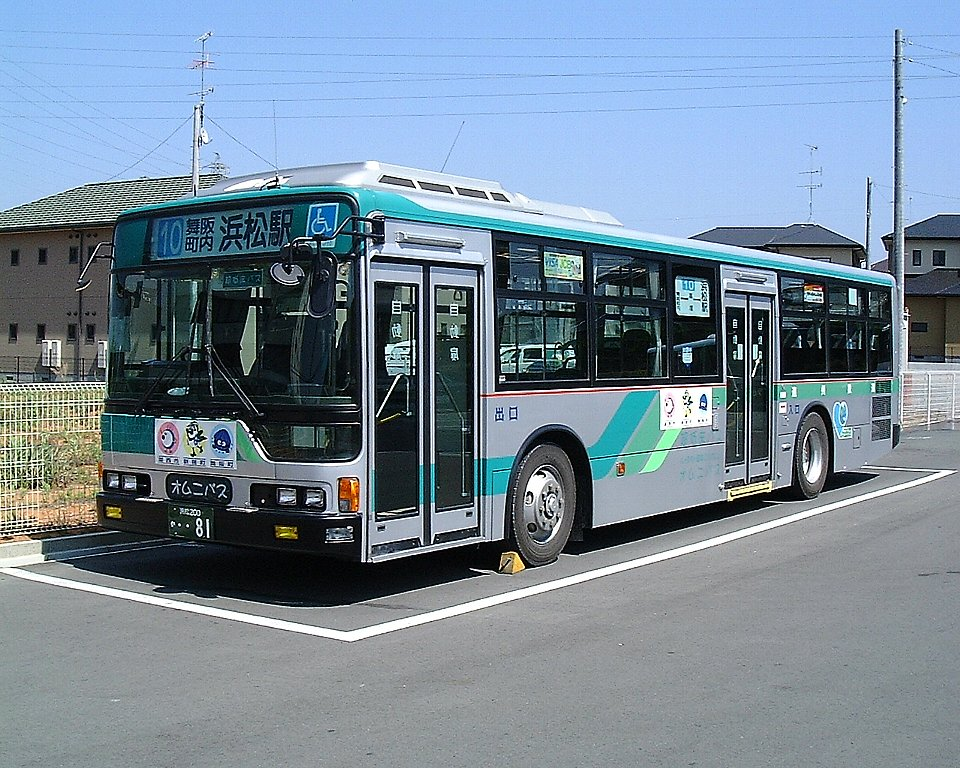
Japanese low-entry bus "omnibus" in Hamamatsu

In Japan, a low-floor bus is called "non-step bus (ノンステップバス)". Mitsubishi Fuso Truck and Bus Corporation used to call a low-floor bus "no-step bus (ノーステップバス)". At Enshu Railway Company in Hamamatsu Area, a low-floor bus is called "omnibus (オムニバス)", "cho-teisho bus (超低床バス; very low-floor bus)" and "cho-teisho omnibus (超低床オムニバス; very low-floor omnibus)". Japanese government calls a low-floor bus "cho-teisho non-step bus (超低床ノンステップバス; very low-floor non-step bus)".

=== Philippines ===
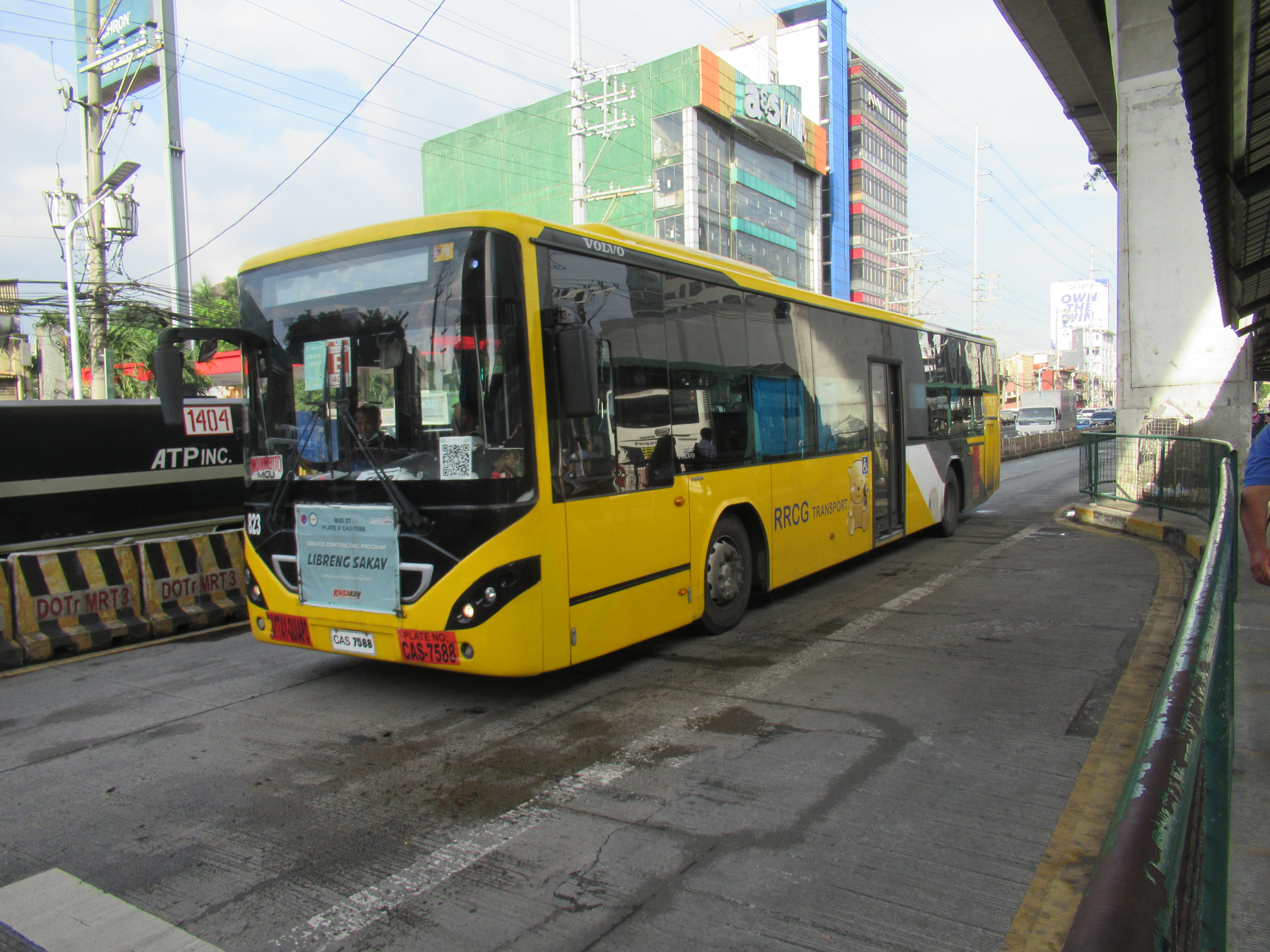
A Volvo B7RLE on the EDSA Busway in Makati

The Land Transportation Franchising and Regulatory Board (LTFRB) mandates the use of low-floor or low-entry buses on city bus routes in the Philippines since 2016.

Low-floor buses are used on city bus networks in Metro Manila, Metro Cebu and Davao City, and on some provincial routes, and most Point-to-Point Bus services, although older coaches are still largely used for such services.

Buses used on the EDSA Busway are usually equipped with 1-2 doors on the left side for boarding at the median stations, although not all units currently have them installed.

Low-floor buses often use upholstered coach-style seating in a 2-3, or 2-2 configuration, although plastic seats may be found in some buses.

=== Singapore ===
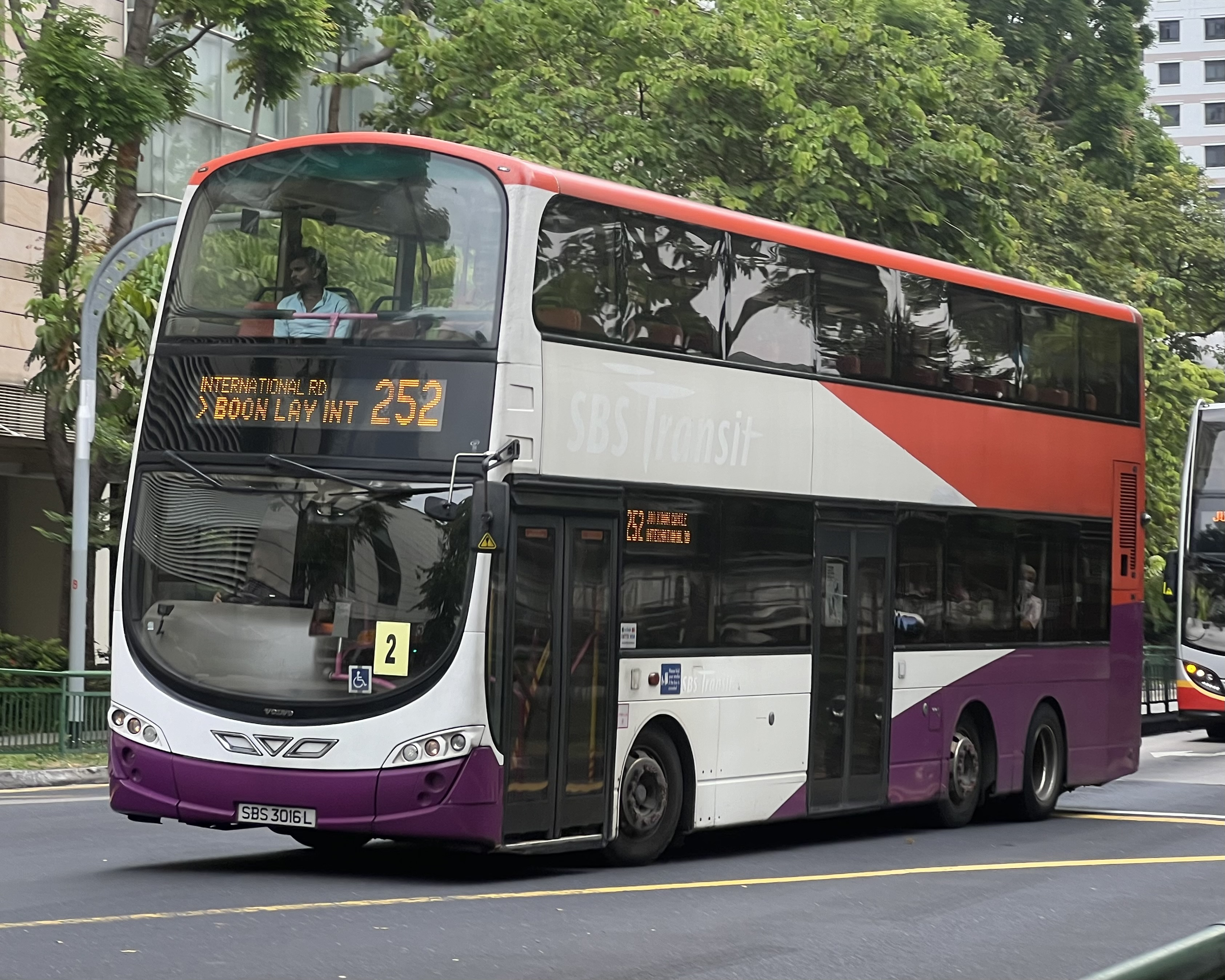
A Wright Eclipse Gemini 2 bodied Volvo B9TL

Low-entry wheelchair-accessible buses were first introduced in Singapore in 2006 with 150 Volvo B9TL ComfortDelGro Engineering buses procured by SBS Transit. These units were registered SBS7300P - SBS7499A. All Volvo B9TL ComfortDelGro Engineering buses were fully retired by September 2023.

In 2007, SBS Transit procured 1,101 units of low-entry Scania K230UB buses bodied by Gemilang Coachworks of Senai, Malaysia. Afterwards, all city buses procured by SBS Transit, SMRT Buses and the Land Transport Authority are low-floor interior as respectively.

As of July 2025, all public buses in Singapore are low-floor layout.

== Europe ==
=== Germany ===
Low-floor buses are first adopted in Germany in 1989, and to make them easier to use for wheelchairs and strollers, the minimum ground clearance of the entire vehicle is lowered and the floor is proportionately raised by 30 centimetres (12 in) above the road surface.

=== United Kingdom ===
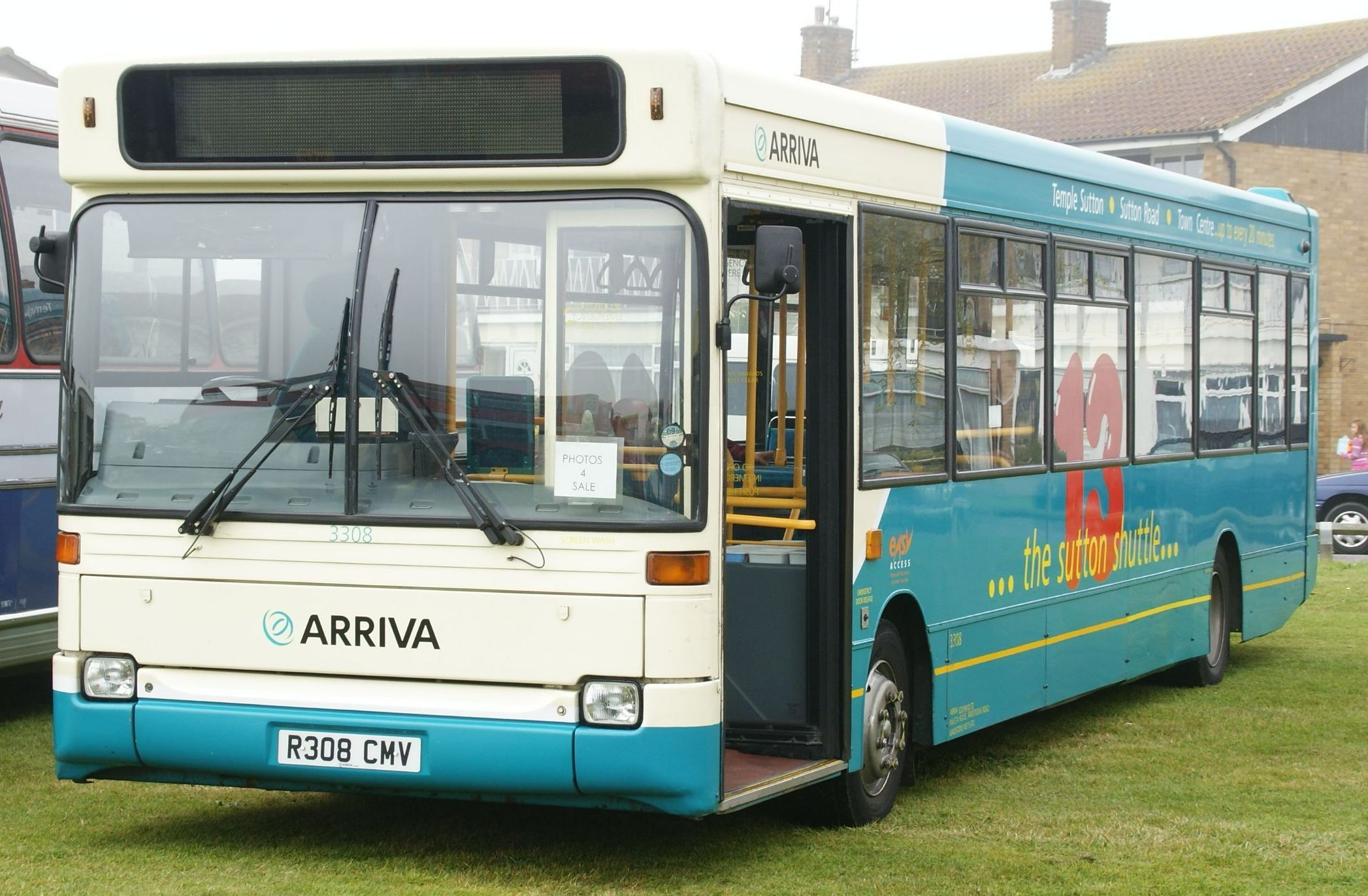
Arriva Southend Plaxton Pointer bodied Dennis Dart SLF

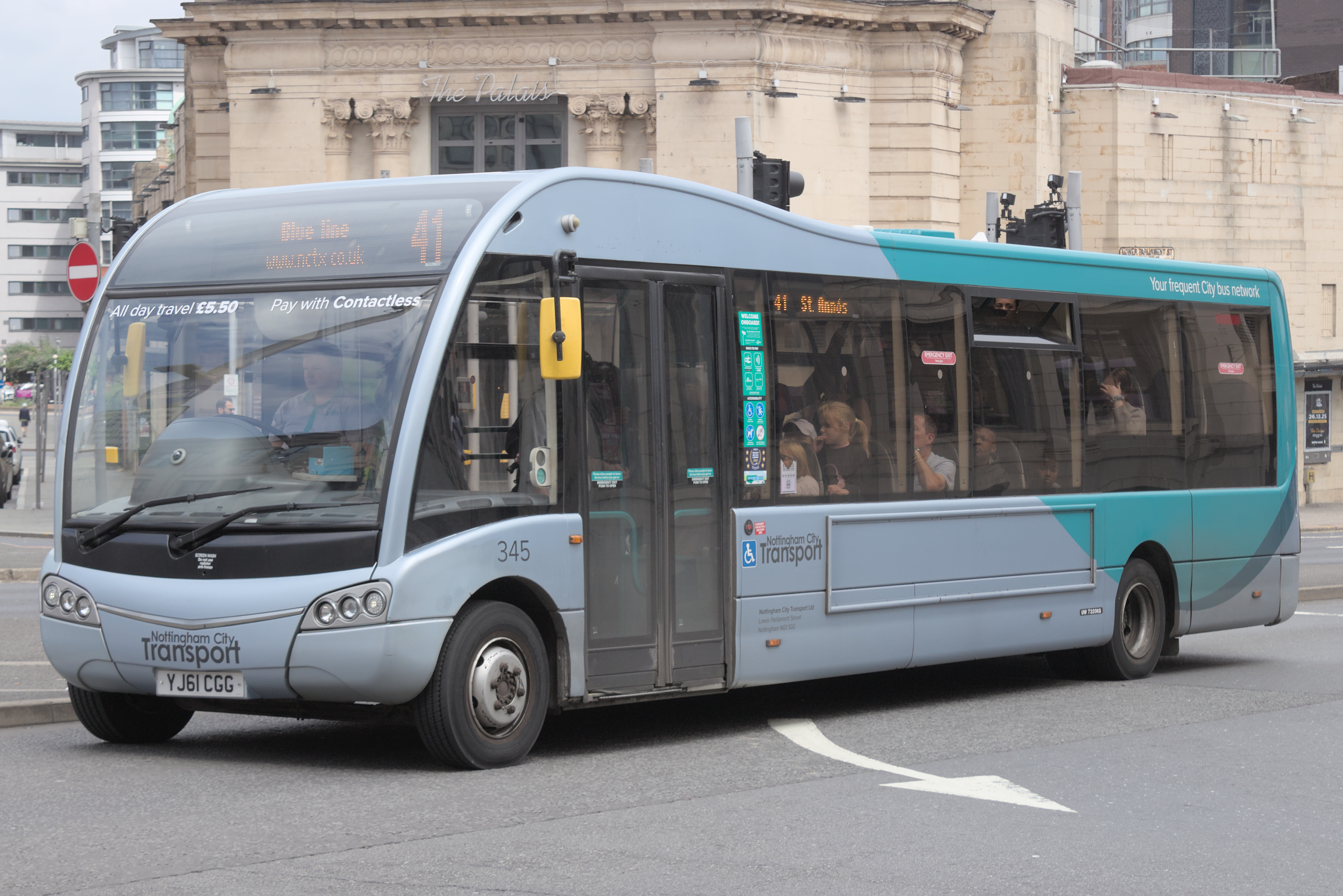
Nottingham City Transport Optare Solo M995 in July 2025

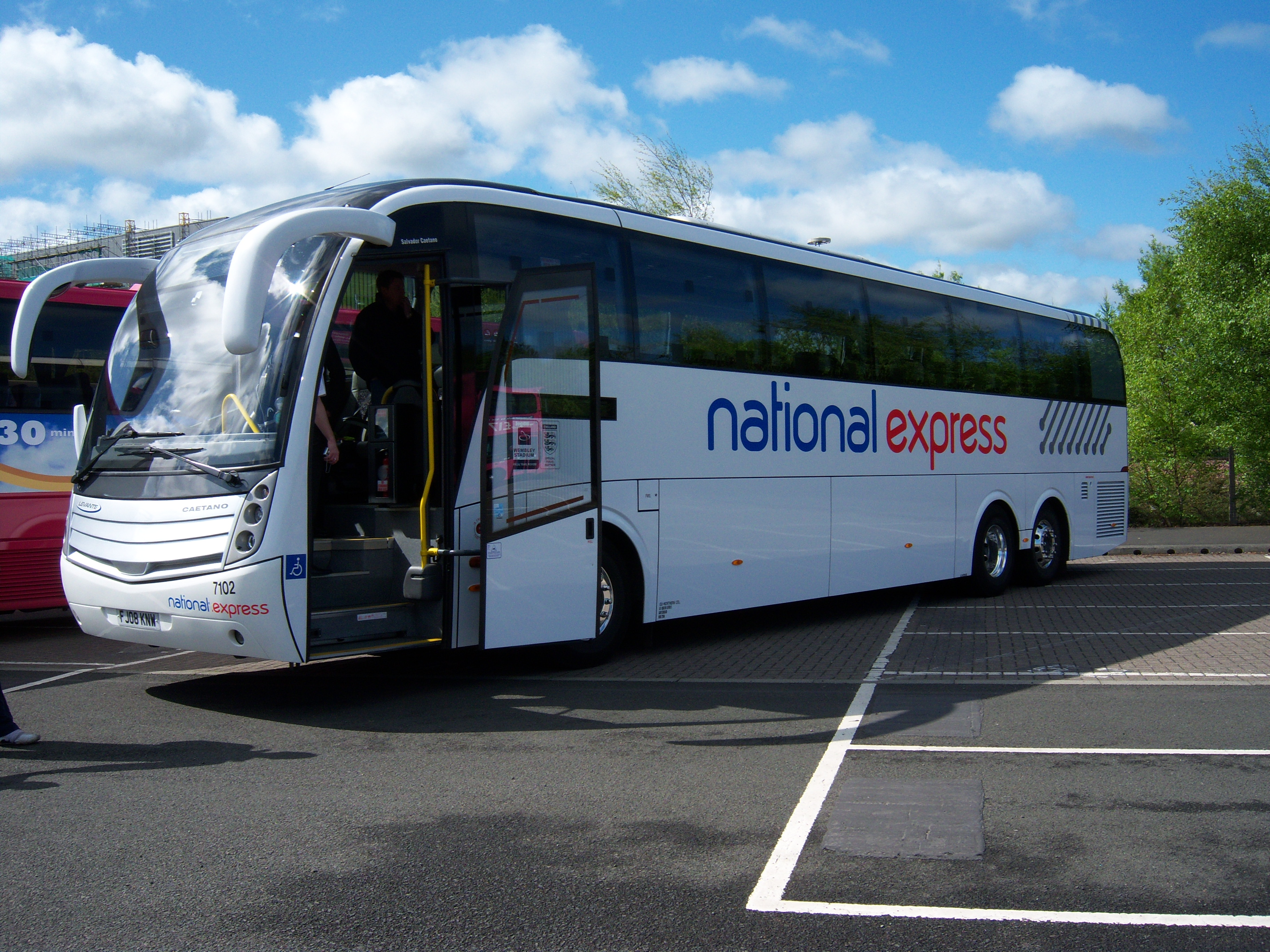
National Express Caetano Levante bodied Scania K340EB 6x2 with wheelchair lift at Metrocentre bus rally in May 2009

The Dennis Dart SLF (Super Low Floor) marked the wholesale introduction of single-deck low floor buses in the United Kingdom in 1995, after many small-scale demonstrator usages. Low floor buses were rapidly introduced on high-profile routes, notably becoming a requirement for London Buses contracts. The Optare Solo introduced in 1997 marked another step change with inroads into smaller usages traditionally served by minibuses. The final phase came with low floor double-deckers the Dennis Trident 2 and Volvo B7TL entering the mass market, even though they were introduced after the Optare Spectra.

London Buses was one of the earliest major users of low-floor buses, with the first low-floor single decker vehicles entering service in 1993 and the first low-floor double decker vehicles entering service in 1998. Following withdrawal of older, high-floor vehicles such as the AEC Routemaster, the bus fleet became fully accessible at the end of 2005, 10 years ahead of the national requirement. London was one of the first major cities in the world to have a fully accessible bus fleet.

Due to the deregulated nature of the public transport system in the UK, adoption of the higher cost low floor buses was usually in conjunction with some sort of grant or quality partnership with a local authority, as the profitability of many routes was not high enough to justify conversion based purely on increased revenue. It has been reported however that adoption of so-called Easy Access buses does have a positive effect of ridership and revenue levels.

Under the Transport Act 1985 the Disabled Persons Transport Advisory Committee (DPTAC) (or commonly DiPTAC) was established to provide independent consultation on accessibility issues. In the same year, the first low floor bus specification was drafted by DPTAC. The Disability Discrimination Act 1995 provided for the completion of the Public Service Vehicles Accessibility Regulations 2000, which specified that all new public service vehicles over 22 seats should be low floor from 31 December 2000, with smaller vehicles mandated from 1 January 2005. The 2000 regulations do not require retro-fitting of pre-existing vehicles or the enforced sale of non-compliant existing vehicles, allowing operators to retain a high floor vehicle until "the end of their economic life". In reality, as the prevalence of low floor buses spreads, combined with grants/incentives, it is likely that the prevalence of high floor vehicles in the national fleet will markedly reduce before all buses were de-registered by 27 October 2014. In the past, in times of reduced economic investment, it was not uncommon for service buses to be used for 15 to 20 years.

While some coaches have been produced with a small front low floor section at the driver's level, most coaches in the UK are being made accessible through the use of wheelchair lifts, with the 2005 Caetano Levante being one of the largest introductions.

While another widely stated benefit of low floor buses is quicker boarding for able-bodied passengers due to the lack of steps, studies have found the opposite effect in the UK. This is apparently due to the prevailing system of operation where passengers enter and exit through one single front door. It has been suggested that the previous 1980s/90s high floor step entrance buses which featured a centre rail, encouraged a bi-directional flow of entering and exiting passengers simultaneously. The removal of the pole to allow wheelchair/buggy access created the situation where the quintessentially polite British bus passenger would wait for all passengers to alight before boarding, leading to an increase in dwell times.

=== Russia ===
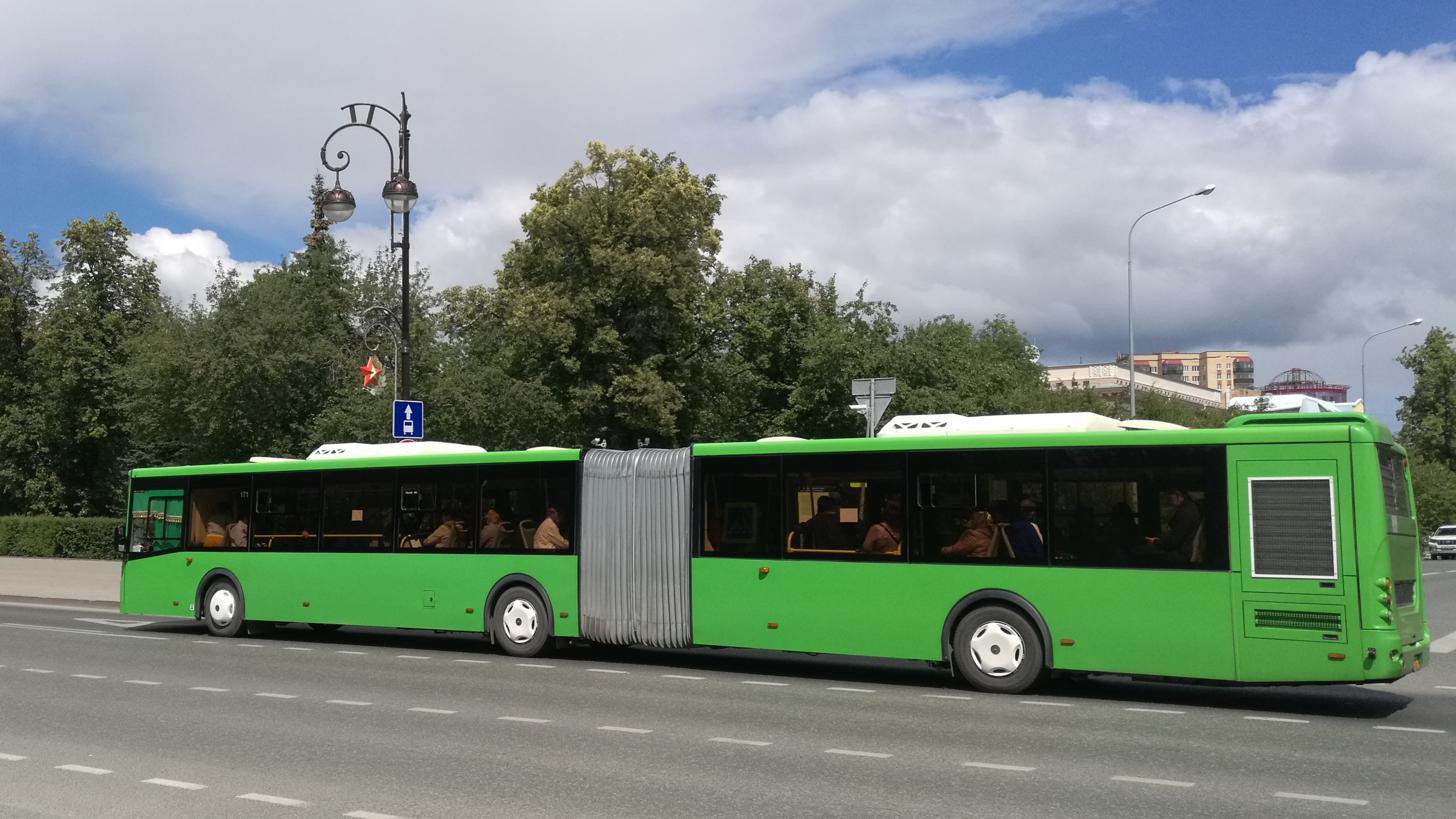
LiAZ-6213 in Tyumen

Moscow was the first city in Russia to introduce low floor as the compulsory requirement for the suppliers of the city buses. By 2005 a few hundreds of low-floor buses started intra-metropolitan service. At first, PAZ-3237 was selected for the city centre, while LiAZ-5292 were chosen to serve city outskirts. Later the articulated version of the latter, specifically designed for Moscow, the LiAZ-6213 was introduced.

In St.Petersburg the transition to low-floor-only city bus services was completed only by 2021. Besides LiAZ-5292 and LiAZ-6213 and other full low-floor models that account for 85% of the city buses, there are also semi low-floor buses in service, with elevated floor in the rear end of the bus. The same applies to trolley buses that are mostly of low-floor design.

Other cities that use low-floor buses on the regular routes are Kazan, Sochi, Tyumen, Pskov and more. Most of these vehicles are domestically manufactured by LiAZ, GAZ, KAMAZ and Volgabus.

== Americas ==
=== United States ===
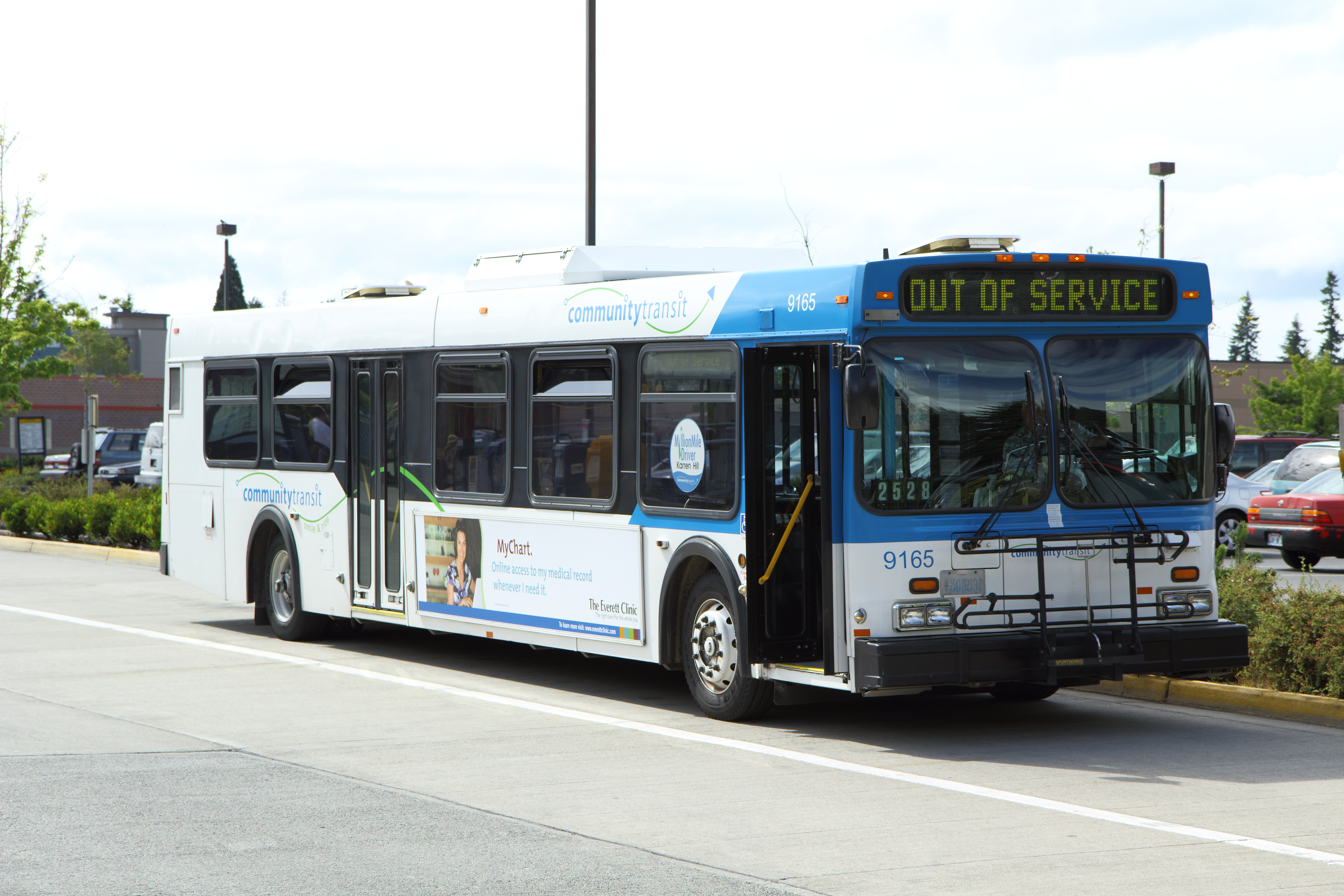
1999 New Flyer D40LF in the Aurora Village Transit Center in Shoreline in June 2010.

In the United States, the Americans with Disabilities Act is credited with motivating the development of low-floor buses, directly affecting the standardized design of the Transbus Program, which concluded with the introduction of so-called 'interim' Advanced Design Buses with a lower floor height but which required lifts to board passengers in wheelchairs. The first low-floor (low-entry) buses to be delivered were the New Flyer Low Floor D40LF, to the Port Authority of New York and New Jersey in 1991. The New Flyer LF was derived from the Den Oudsten B85/B86. Other competitors followed suit, with the Orion VI (1995), Nova Bus LF Series (1996, also derived from the Den Oudsten B85), Gillig Low Floor (1997, derived from a shuttle bus design for the Hertz rental car agency), and Neoplan AN440L (1990/94/99). By 2008, most new bus orders in the United States were for low-floor buses.

=== Argentina ===
In the capital of this country, the Autonomous City of Buenos Aires, since 1997 the legislation governs that all buses of lines of "national" jurisdiction (bus lines that circulate within the capital district and/or cross from here to the suburbs). The first low-floor bus produced in Argentina and marketed in this country was the El Detalle OA105, and the first low-floor bus imported by Argentina was the Marcopolo Torino GV Low-Entry brought from Brazil in 1998.

=== Paraguay ===
Within Paraguay's public transit system, it was not until 2012 that the first low-floor bus in the country were added to its fleet, being a 1999 Marcopolo Viale imported used from Argentina.

=== Brazil ===
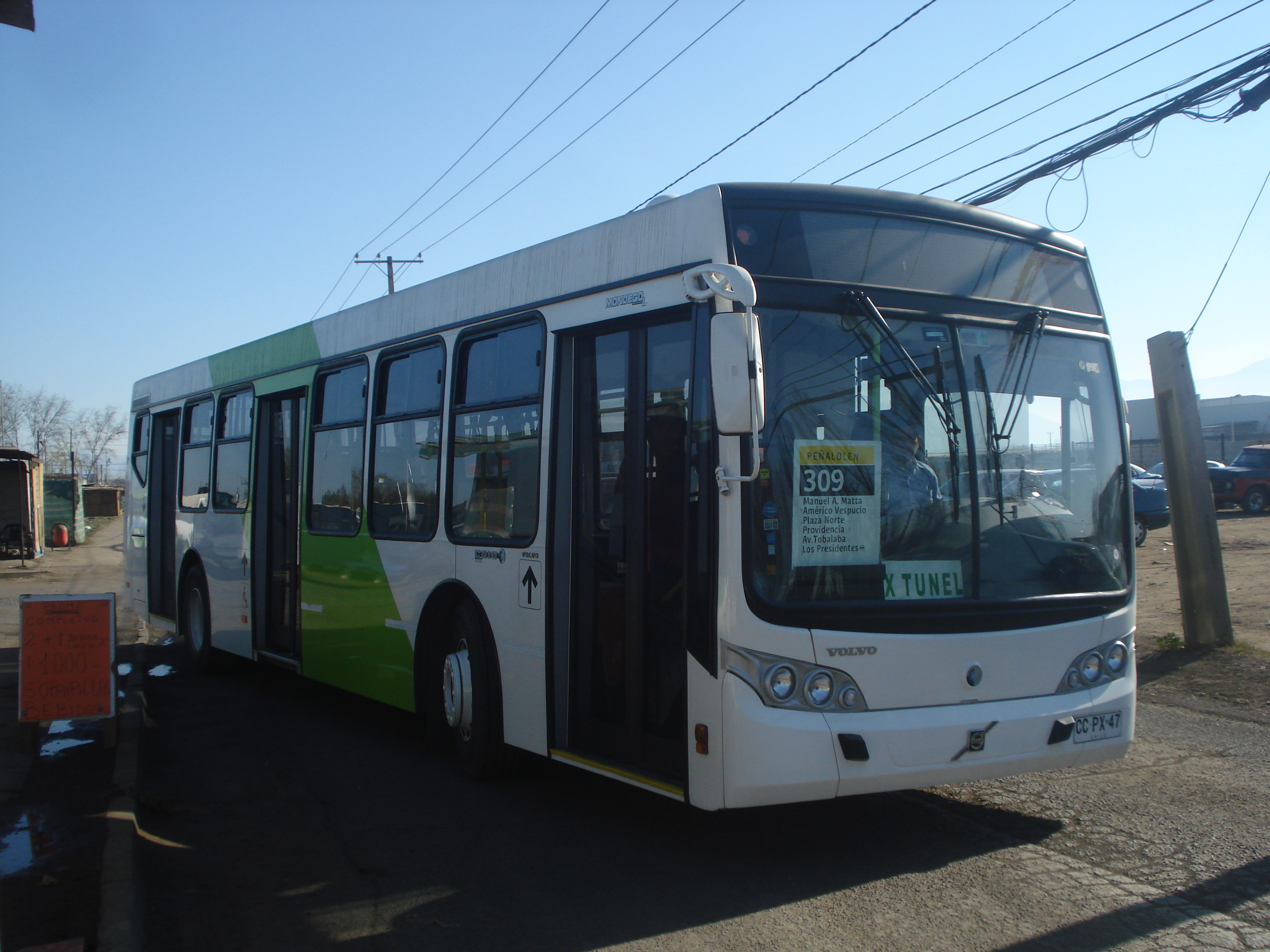
Volvo B7RLE low floor bus in Brazil

In São Paulo, low-floor buses began to become popular in the 2000s with the creation of the so-called Sistema Interligado (Interconnected System, in English) which divided bus routes into so-called lines:

Structural, which connect the large terminals of the regions to the center, or connect two large terminals of two regions passing through the center

Regional Articulation, which connect distant neighborhoods to the center without passing through large terminals, or connect two distant neighborhoods passing through important regions.

Locations/distributors, which connect neighborhoods to large terminals or stations. None of these lines pass through the city center.

Low-floor buses have become popular on the Structural and Regional Articulation lines, and have been a mandatory model to be purchased for these since 2015. Until then, exceptions for local lines with low-floor buses were rare, but this has been changing since 2019 and especially since 2023. In 2023, the city banned the purchase of new diesel buses. With the mandatory use of electric buses, new buses on local lines are also being made with low floors, as there is a very low or non-existent availability of high-floor electric buses.

The majority of standard and truncated vehicles were and are the Caio Millennium and Millennium BRT "toco" models, on Mercedes-Benz O500U, Scania K270 and K310, Volvo B7RLE and B290RLE and Volkswagen 17.240 and 17.260 chassis.

For articulated vehicles, Caio Mondego HA and Millennium BRT vehicles with Mercedes-Benz O500UA and O500UDA chassis were and are used.

The Biarticulates were made with Caio TopBus PB and Millennium BRT TopBus bodies on Volvo B360S and B9Salf chassis.

== Oceania ==
=== Australia ===
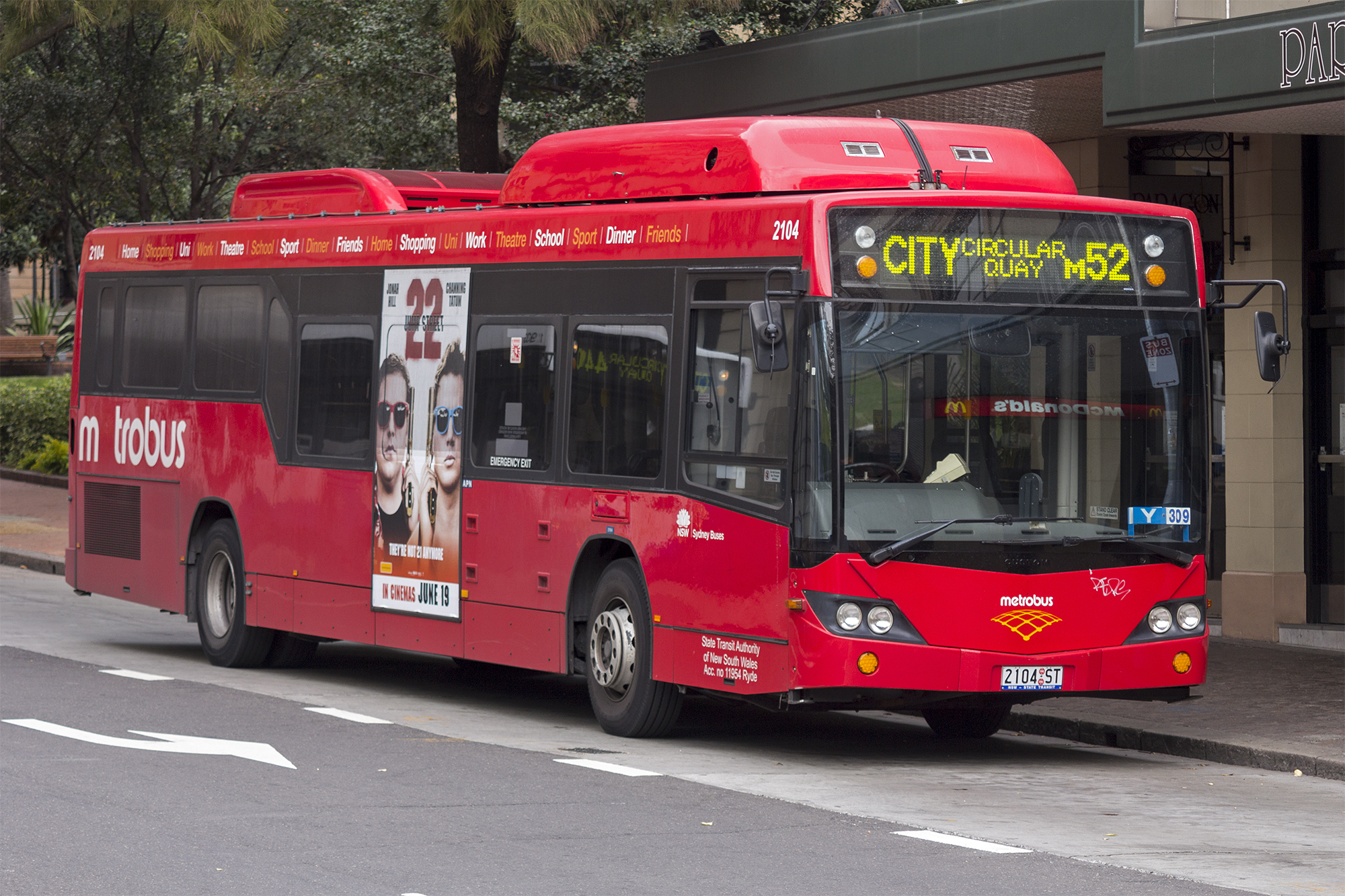
Metrobus liveried Mercedes-Benz O 500 LE CNG

==== Brisbane ====
In Brisbane, all Translink buses are of a low-floor design. A small number of higher capacity articulated low-floor buses are used to service the city's southern busways.

==== Sydney ====
In Sydney, routes may be operated by both high-floor buses and low-entry ones. Selected routes can be set aside specifically for low-entry buses which are considered to be wheelchair-accessible routes. A recent all-low-entry bus network is the Metrobus system.

== See also ==
- Accessibility
- Low-floor tram
- List of buses
