= Goose Creek, Louisville =

Neighborhood in Louisville, Kentucky

Coordinates: 38°18′58″N 85°38′55″W

Goose Creek is a neighborhood of Louisville, Kentucky located where Goose Creek meets the Ohio River. It should not be confused with the adjacent incorporated city of Goose Creek.
