= Timepoint =

Timepoint may refer to:

- Timing point, a public transit stop with a scheduled departure time
- Time point, a concept in music
- A fictional prison for time travelers, created by Epoch, a character in the DC comics universe
