= Manor Creek, Kentucky =

- City
- Location of Manor Creek in Jefferson County, Kentucky

- Location within the state of Kentucky Manor Creek (the United States)
- Coordinates: 38°17′53″N 85°35′14″W
- Country: United States
- State: Kentucky
- County: Jefferson
- Incorporated: 1972

Area
  - Total: 0.054 sq mi (0.14 km^{2})
  - Land: 0.054 sq mi (0.14 km^{2})
  - Water: 0 sq mi (0.00 km^{2})
- Elevation: 653 ft (199 m)

Population (2020)
  - Total: 240
  - Density: 4,344.0/sq mi (1,677.23/km^{2})
- Time zone: UTC-5 (Eastern (EST))
  - Summer (DST): UTC-4 (EDT)
- ZIP Code: 40241
- FIPS code: 21-49800
- GNIS feature ID: 2405010
- Website: https://www.manorcreekky.com/

Manor Creek is a home rule-class city in Jefferson County, Kentucky, United States. As of the 2020 census, Manor Creek had a population of 240.

== Geography ==
Manor Creek is located in northeastern Jefferson County. It is bordered to the east by Ten Broeck, to the south by Broeck Pointe, at its southern corner by Goose Creek, to the west by Barbourmeade, and otherwise by consolidated Louisville/Jefferson County. Downtown Louisville is 11 miles (18 km) to the southwest.

According to the United States Census Bureau, Manor Creek has a total area of 0.03 square miles (0.07 km^{2}), all land.

== Demographics ==
Historical population
Census	Pop.	Note	%±
1980	241		—
1990	179		−25.7%
2000	221		23.5%
2010	140		−36.7%
2020	240		71.4%
U.S. Decennial Census

As of the census of 2000, there were 221 people, 80 households, and 68 families residing in the city. The population density was 3,563.6 inhabitants per square mile (1,375.9/km^{2}). There were 82 housing units at an average density of 1,322.2 per square mile (510.5/km^{2}). The racial makeup of the city was 90.95% White, 2.26% African American, 4.98% Asian, and 1.81% from two or more races.

There were 80 households, out of which 38.8% had children under the age of 18 living with them, 73.8% were married couples living together, 10.0% had a female householder with no husband present, and 15.0% were non-families. 13.8% of all households were made up of individuals, and 5.0% had someone living alone who was 65 years of age or older. The average household size was 2.76 and the average family size was 3.04.

In the city, the population was spread out, with 27.1% under the age of 18, 5.9% from 18 to 24, 26.7% from 25 to 44, 30.8% from 45 to 64, and 9.5% who were 65 years of age or older. The median age was 39 years. For every 100 females, there were 90.5 males. For every 100 females age 18 and over, there were 85.1 males.

The median income for a household in the city was $76,198, and the median income for a family was $77,423. Males had a median income of $56,458 versus $36,500 for females. The per capita income for the city was $33,057. None of the population or families were below the poverty line.
