= On-time performance =

Measure of public transport reliability

In public transportation, schedule adherence or on-time performance refers to the level of success of the service (such as a bus or train) remaining on the published schedule. On-time performance, sometimes referred to as on time running, is normally expressed as a percentage, with a higher percentage meaning more vehicles are on time. The level of on-time performance for many transport systems is a very important measure of the effectiveness of the system.

== Background ==
On-time performance is a measure of the ability of transport services to be on time. Almost all formal transportation systems have timetables, which describe when vehicles are to arrive at scheduled stops. Transport services have a higher utility where services run on time, as anyone planning on making use of the service can align their activities with that of the transport system. On-time performance is particularly important where services are infrequent, and people need to plan to meet services.

The ability of different transport modes to meet on-time performance statistics depends on the degree to which they are affected by external factors. For example, rail services often operate on a separated right of way, and so are not affected by road congestion. Buses, unless they are separated from road traffic, will be heavily affected by congestion.

To calculate the percentage of vehicles on time, comparison is needed with the timetable. A comparison is often completed for arrival time rather than departure time, but both are common. Departure times are normally more on-time than arrival times, as incidents and breakdowns occur that reduce the on-time performance. When the comparison is made between the timetable, and the actual arrival or departure time, a rule is applied to determine how much of a deviation is permitted. For example, if a bus is 4 minutes 20 seconds late, a rules may be applied that a bus is only late when later than 5 minutes, so this service would be counted as on time. The choice of threshold for lateness is an important one, with a low threshold resulting in a lower on-time performance statistic. A high threshold will result in more services on time, but may result in the managing corporation or government body being accused on not reporting correctly.

Passengers can be updated on the movement of transport vehicles with passenger information systems. These systems display the arrival time of vehicles to stops, stations or airports, and typical information displayed is the time in minutes to the next scheduled arrival. Some of these systems have been extended to include apps to show the movement of trains/buses/planes/ferries. Where services are delayed, more information can be provided, such as alternative transport options, or estimated time till services resume.

A small number of transport systems operate on the principle of go-when-full. This type of transport system will not have any meaningful measure of on-time performance.

=== Airlines ===
Airlines are closely monitored on their on-time performance. Numerous websites exist for reporting on punctuality for airlines, often operated by government departments. Iraqi Airways, an airline, uses a rule that aircraft that depart within 15 minutes of scheduled departure are on time. The 15 minutes rules for on-time performance is commonly applied throughout the airline industry. Airlines typically perform well when their on-time performance reaches 90%. OAG and Cirium regularly publish airline on-time performance rankings and data. in 2022, Cirium named Azul Airlines the most on-time airline. Cirium's 2023 most on-time airline was Avianca.

On-time performance for aircraft is simple to calculate as aircraft depart and arrive at airports, and these are clear points to complete the on-time performance calculation.

=== Buses ===
On bus services, performance measures are substantially less clear for bus services. Performance can be calculated for each and every stop. But another method that saves resources is to calculate on-time performance for only the start and end of the bus route, which can produce meaningful statistics. One problem with this method is where very large stops or interchanges are not at the start and end of the bus journey, but in the middle, and the start and end of the route are bus depots or other small stops for which on-time performance statistics are not as important. In this situation on-time performance may be calculated at the major interchange, rather than the start and end.

Bus routes are frequently late, given buses mix with road traffic. Bus rapid transit is a bus-based mass transit system, where road infrastructure has been specifically constructed to allow better on-time performance, and more frequent and high-speed services. This type of bus system is far less exposed to problem of low on-time performance statistics than regular bus services. Trying to get to the school on time can be a big hassle for drivers. This results in 76 percent of schools in Ontario and Quebec to have late departures by chance not choice.

=== Light rail ===
Light rail, whilst being a rail system, can be exposed to problems with poor on-time performance. This is especially the case where rail service operates in the middle of congested roads, and where a light rail system has a separate right of way the on-time performance will be better.

== Transport hubs ==
Users of transport systems often use several transport modes to complete a journey. They will change transport modes at a transport hub, and all transport modes have some kind of transport hub.

On-time performance is important to interchanges. Where on-time performance is poor, passengers or goods may miss a connection, and so be forced to wait. In some cases, the transit time allowed from one transport mode to another may be very small, and so any lateness can result in services being missed. Where services are infrequent, such as a long-distance train trip, or a flight, then the consequences of late services can be high. Transport systems that exist to deliver passengers and services to interchanges should be particularly concerned with achieving a good on-time performance.

== Measurement ==
Typically on-time performance is measured by comparing each service with its schedule. A threshold is chosen for how late a service can be before it is determined to be late.

on-time Performance $=\frac{\text{services on time}}{\text{total services}} \times 100\%$	1

The scale of delays are often calculated in delay minutes. A delay minute is the number of minutes a service is delayed multiplied by the number of passengers on board the transport vehicle.

passenger delay minutes $=\text{minutes service delayed}\times \text{number of passengers}$	2

Network Rail, a large rail infrastructure provider in the UK, uses passenger delay minutes as a mechanism to reward and punish for services being on time and late respectively. Using delay minutes as a measure allows for comparisons between heavily loaded large transport vehicles, and much smaller or lightly loaded vehicles. The economic cost of a large transport vehicle being delayed is much greater than a service that is almost empty.

== Factors ==
There are many factors that can affect on-time performance. Depending on the situation, the service may face regular delays or a service that usually performs on time may be occasionally behind schedule. Some of these factors include:

- Traffic congestion:
  - Bus transport: The volume of automobile traffic on the bus's route can affect the bus's ability to keep on the schedule. While a route that is free of obstruction can remain on schedule or even move ahead of schedule, heavy traffic can slow down the bus behind its schedule. This can be due to regular conditions at the time of day, or an occasional or one-time event, such as a sports game or festival that draws a large crowd.
  - Rail transport: The volume of traffic on the route can cause even more delays for rail vehicles, because of tight scheduling at sidings and other meet points. On passenger railroads, freight traffic is especially problematic because of the length and slow acceleration of the freight trains.
  - Ferries are often affected by congestion at quays and piers. One report reported a third of all delays are caused by congestion.
- Collision: A collision that obstructs traffic flow can also tie up vehicles on the route until the accident is cleared and therefore cause them to be behind schedule.
- Breakdown: A disabled bus or train, besides being unable to complete its own route, may slow down others that follow on the schedule. As riders scramble to board a subsequent bus or train on the schedule, the higher ridership levels on that run may slow it down. Additionally, on a rail line, a disabled train may block other trains from passing, or may require track-sharing with opposing trains, thereby slowing service in both directions.
- Detour: A road closure that forces the bus to temporarily deviate from its regular route may cause it take more time than planned to reach its destination.
- Passenger load: When a special event takes place, the service may experience higher ridership levels than usual, leading to more time the bus or train may have to spend allowing passengers to board and depart.
- Unrealistic scheduling: Many public transportation agencies are tax-subsidized, and therefore are often cash-strapped while attempting to maximize service provided to customers. In such cases, schedules that are written do not provide enough time for operators to travel along the route in the time allotted, and layovers are too short to allow enough recovery time, thereby seriously delaying the service on a regular basis.
- Weather: Inclement weather may cause a bus that usually remains on schedule to be behind as a result of precautions that must be taken by the vehicle's operator and other vehicles on the road. Trains might have to operate slower as a result of slippery rail during the autumn season, and high wind can affect signal systems.
- Crewing issues. Crew may be late to work, or be at the wrong place at the wrong time. Alternatively, they may make mistakes that delay services.

== Effects of poor on-time performance ==
The effect of delays to a transport system are normally calculated as costs in dollars, either to the passengers, or to the transport provider. The transport provider will incur costs of the additional use of the vehicle, crew costs, and fuel. In many cases the cost is calculated as a dollar value per minute. The total cost of delays for an entire transport system for one year can be very large.

In many publications the effect of poor on-time performance is equated to lost money. As passengers are delayed, this delay is equated to dollars, and this is the amount that is lost. Calculations are performed for the total amount "lost" per year for different countries, for example, for the US it was estimated that the cost to the country was $32.9 billion in 2007. The total amount of cost per country per year can be very large.

An economic cost is calculated through the following formula:

Economic cost $=\text{minutes service delayed}\times \text{cost per minute delay}$	3

The delay cost per minute is calculated as the addition of direct costs to a service provider, and the economic cost to passengers through lost time. This is:

Delay cost per minute $=\text{direct cost to service provider per minute}+ \text{economic cost to late customers per minute}$	4

The economic cost per minute for passengers is often expressed as a percentage of the average in the area. For different transport modes the cost per minute may be different, as those using buses may have a lower income than those using trains.

Buses when late may experience a problem known as bus bunching. On some bus lines with a more frequent service, if one bus falls behind schedule passenger numbers waiting at bus stops may grow, required a longer layover time. One or more subsequent buses on the published schedule may pass these already cleared stops and have a nearly empty run, and may actually jump ahead of their scheduled time to the point that two or more buses are within close sight of one another. In some cases, one bus is able to pass another. This phenomenon is sometimes known as clumping or bunching. When this occurs, the even spacing of buses on the schedule may be severely disrupted, leading to extremely long waits for those attempting to catch a bus, and multiple buses arriving at once. Bus bunching serves to reduce the effectiveness of buses as a transport mode.

== Improving schedule adherence ==
Transit agencies often take the following measures in attempts to improve schedule adherence on their routes:

- Providing better information to drivers on their schedule and on-time performance. Bus and rail drivers may not know if they are on time as this information is not commonly provided. A driver advisory system (DAS) can provide better information, and can inform drivers of their correct departure and arrival time.
- Adding additional route capacity, so the effect of bottlenecks is reduced. Capacity constraints are common in many transport systems, and adding capacity is normally an effective way to reduce delays.
- Modify schedules by adding running time, known as schedule padding. This is the most common solution, but agencies often add running time by cutting layover time, which adversely affects the ability to recover from unplanned incidents. If layover time is to remain the same, it may require an increased expenditure in the system's budget or a slight reduction in the number of trips.
- Increasing the number of reserve vehicles. All transport vehicles can experience engineering failures, which cause them to be unavailable for service. Increasing the number of reserve vehicles increases costs, but allows vehicles to be replaced when needed. For this strategy to work vehicles need to be placed at strategic locations.
- Modifying routes to a route where buses can be less obstructed, when this does not interfere with the ability of riders to reach their buses.
- Building bus and rail lines which are grade separated from road traffic.
- For airlines, delays are often caused by ground processing at airports, so improving the airport plane and passenger handling can have a big effect of on-time performance.
- Splitting a long route into two or more shorter ones, as shorter routes are more likely to remain on schedule. Shorter routes generally are exposed to fewer problems.
- Some cities have introduced bus rapid transit services or limited stop lines on long, overcrowded routes. This involves the use of part of the route's budget to operate another line on the same route that stops only at key points. While the overall frequency of the original route is reduced, riders traveling over a longer distance have the option of obtaining a quicker trip on the limited-stop line.
- Some agencies and transport companies have installed GPS devices on their buses and trains to monitor the locations of the vehicles. By linking this real-time information with stop locations and predicted travel-times, the estimated time of arrival of the next service is then displayed at some stops.
- Customer interfaces: Some agencies and companies have made the GPS tracking data described above available to public transport users online, by a toll-free number, or through the mobile web.

== Real-world examples ==
The following chart shows some examples of real-world on-time performance. The figures are always (unless stated otherwise) per vehicle, not per customer.

Operator / Location	Mode of transport	Period	< 1'	< 2'	< 3'	< 5'	< 10'	< 15'	< 20'	< 30'	Comments	Source
Cathay Pacific; Hong Kong	International air travel	2014						70.7%				
Lufthansa; Germany	All flights	2014						84.7%				
Qantas; Australia	Domestic air travel	2015						88.6%				
GO Transit; Toronto, Canada	Buses	2014–15 Fiscal Year				95%						
Metropolitan Atlanta Rapid Transit Authority (MARTA); Atlanta, Georgia, USA	Buses	August 2025				77.02%						
Amtrak; United States	Passenger railway	2008–2018 (average)					77%				For trip length <250 miles train is late if >10 min	
Network Rail; Great Britain	National railway	2014					89.3%				Commuter services are late >5 min, intercity >10 min	
NS; Netherlands	Passenger railway	2019			91.9%	92.6%		97.7%			Measured at selected key stations	
ÖBB; Austria	All passenger rail	2021				97%						
SBB; Switzerland	All passenger rail	2014			87.7%							
SBB; Switzerland	Freight	2014			77.2%							
Taiwan High Speed Rail; Taiwan	High-speed rail	2013				99.44%						
GO Transit; Toronto, Canada	Commuter rail	2014–15 Fiscal Year				94%						
Hong Kong MTR; Hong Kong	Metro (rail)	2015 to October					99.9%				The threshold for on time is high at 8 minutes	
Metropolitan Atlanta Rapid Transit Authority (MARTA); Atlanta, Georgia, USA	Metro (rail)	August 2025				94.39%						
New York City Subway; New York City, USA	Metro (rail)	2018				65%						
SMRT; Singapore	Metro (rail)	FY 2014				92.6%						
Yarra Trams; Melbourne, Australia	Trams	Jan 2016				86.7%						

== See also ==
- Flight cancellation and delay
