= Broeck Pointe, Kentucky =

- City
- Location of Broeck Pointe in Jefferson County, Kentucky

- Location within the state of Kentucky Broeck Pointe (the United States)
- Coordinates: 38°17′44″N 85°35′08″W
- Country: United States
- State: Kentucky
- County: Jefferson

Area
  - Total: 0.073 sq mi (0.19 km^{2})
  - Land: 0.073 sq mi (0.19 km^{2})
  - Water: 0 sq mi (0.00 km^{2})
- Elevation: 656 ft (200 m)

Population (2020)
  - Total: 245
  - Density: 3,429.1/sq mi (1,323.99/km^{2})
- Time zone: UTC-5 (Eastern (EST))
  - Summer (DST): UTC-4 (EDT)
- ZIP Code: 40241
- Area code: 502
- FIPS code: 21-09847
- GNIS feature ID: 2403931

Broeck Pointe is a home rule-class city in Jefferson County, Kentucky, United States. As of the 2020 census, Broeck Pointe had a population of 245.

== Geography ==
Broeck Pointe is located in northeastern Jefferson County. It is bordered to the west by Goose Creek, to the northwest by Barbourmeade, to the north by Manor Creek, to the east by Ten Broeck, and to the south by a portion of Louisville. It is 11 miles (18 km) northeast of downtown Louisville.

According to the United States Census Bureau, the city has a total area of 0.07 square miles (0.19 km^{2}), all land.

== Demographics ==
Historical population
Census	Pop.	Note	%±
1990	325		—
2000	294		−9.5%
2010	272		−7.5%
2020	245		−9.9%
U.S. Decennial Census

As of the census of 2000, there were 294 people, 96 households, and 88 families residing in the city. The population density was 4,519.4 inhabitants per square mile (1,745.0/km^{2}). There were 96 housing units at an average density of 1,475.7 per square mile (569.8/km^{2}). The racial makeup of the city was 94.90% White, 3.06% Black or African American and 2.04% Asian. Hispanic or Latino of any race were 1.02% of the population.

There were 96 households, out of which 43.8% had children under the age of 18 living with them, 86.5% were married couples living together, 5.2% had a female householder with no husband present, and 8.3% were non-families. 8.3% of all households were made up of individuals, and 4.2% had someone living alone who was 65 years of age or older. The average household size was 3.06 and the average family size was 3.25.

In the city, the population was spread out, with 28.2% under the age of 18, 6.5% from 18 to 24, 22.8% from 25 to 44, 35.0% from 45 to 64, and 7.5% who were 65 years of age or older. The median age was 41 years. For every 100 females, there were 94.7 males. For every 100 females age 18 and over, there were 88.4 males.

The median income for a household in the city was $103,106, and the median income for a family was $106,592. Males had a median income of $65,938 versus $39,167 for females. The per capita income for the city was $35,297. About 2.3% of families and 2.8% of the population were below the poverty line, including 5.1% of those under the age of eighteen and none of those 65 or over.
