= Layover =

Pause during scheduled transportation

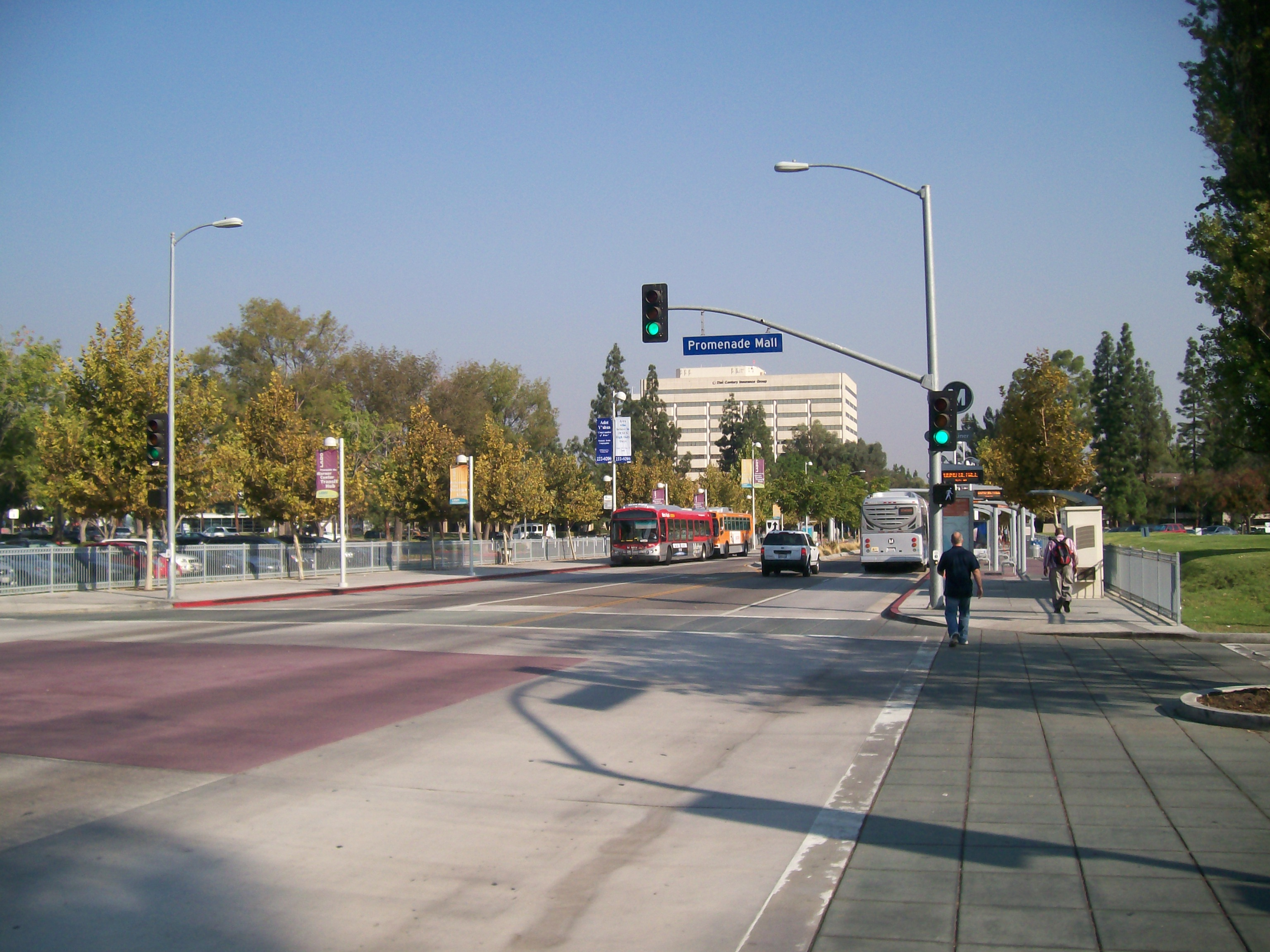
stopover for buses at LACMTA's Warner Center Transit Hub, Los Angeles

In scheduled transportation, a stopover (also way station, or connection) is a period of time when a vehicle stops, with passengers possibly changing vehicles. In public transit, this typically takes a few minutes at a trip terminal. For air travel, where layovers are longer, passengers will exit the vehicle and wait in the terminal, often to board another vehicle traveling elsewhere.

A layover is a longer form of stopover, allowing time to leave the transport system for sightseeing or overnight accommodation. To lay down and rest at your stopover.

== History ==
Historically, a way station was a facility for resting or changing a team of horses drawing a stagecoach. Typically a simple meal was available to passengers, who were also able to use restrooms. Basic overnight accommodations were sometimes available in remote instances.

== Mass transit ==
A stopover for mass transit is a scheduled downtime for the vehicle and driver between terminal-to-terminal trips. This short period of recovery time built into the schedule is generally used for one or more of the following reasons: recover from delays, provide breaks for the driver, and/or allow time for a driver change. While in practice the terms "recovery time" and "stopover" define the same block of time in the schedule, technically the recovery time is intended to compensate for the vehicle running behind the schedule (delays may be caused by earlier traffic congestion or excess boarding times), while the layover time is intended for the driver to take a break and is regulated by either the mass transit agency, or the trade union rules. With the electrification of bus fleets, transit systems must also consider the need for 'stopover charging' stations. Such stations allow an electric bus to partially charge its battery after completion of its route and while the driver is taking a required break.

In addition to being used at the end of vehicle trip, stopover can be scheduled at timing points during the trip, in which case they are often referred to as loading/unloading time. In this case, they serve as extra time provided for the loading and unloading of passengers, which is most often scheduled at busy stops. They also allow time to pass if a service is running early, to prevent arriving at a timing point ahead of schedule.

== Long-distance rail and bus ==
A stopover in long-distance travel by train or intercity bus is a break that a passenger must take between vehicles in a multi-vehicle trip or while changing the mode of transportation. It is the time spent at a terminal or hub after leaving one vehicle and waiting to board the next. Many inter-city and international trips include stopovers.

As in mass transit, a stopover in long-distance travel may provide for a break taken by the operator. A vehicle is said to be laying over after it finishes its route and is waiting prior to a return trip, or is taking a break to change crews or for the crew to rest.

== Air ==
In air travel, a stop or transfer (from one airplane to another) is considered to be a stopover or connection up to a certain maximum allowed connecting time, while a so-called layover is a substantially longer break in the flight itinerary. For flight crews, a 'layover' generally indicates a longer, usually overnight, break between flights.

For airlines that adopt hub-and-spoke network operations, stopover at an airline hub are a necessary aspect of the travel experience. Because stopovers increase total travel time, the need for and length of a layover can have a major influence on purchasing decisions for passengers. The maximum time depends on many variables, but for most U.S. and Canadian itineraries, it is 4 hours, and for most international itineraries (including any domestic stops), it is 24 hours.

In determining stopover time within a hub-and-spoke network, airlines must consider multiple factors, notably airport congestion and passenger expectations. During a stopover, a plane must be refueled, its cabin cleaned, and provisions restocked. Stopover also allow for crew changes, as well as maintenance checks and, when needed, minor repairs. Traditionally, airlines have sought to minimize stopover duration due to the presumption that total journey time is an important consideration for passengers. However, this can create stresses on both airline crews and airport operations, increasing costs and ground congestion. For passengers, if the stopover time is too short, there is an increased risk of missing the connecting flight or having to rush between planes, which can make such a flight less desirable.

Some airports are designed with amenities for travelers with long stopovers such as gyms, yoga studios, movie theaters, and fine dining restaurants.

In the early 2000s, the marketing of layovers to long-haul travellers increased with a focus on providing a mid-journey break of one or more nights at a destination between a traveller's origin and final destination. These often are developed as a partnership between airlines, airports, and tourism organizations. Passengers may include a stopover in their journey for a variety of reasons, including travel logistics and expenses, the opportunity to visit a different destination, or take a "mini-holiday" during travel.

== See also ==
- Bus terminus
- Transport hub
- Stage station

== Sources ==
- Sutherland, J. (2009). "Layover". Key Concepts in Leisure. Bloomsbury Publishing. ISBN 978-1-350-31483-2.
- Boyle, Daniel K. (2009). "Layover and Recovery Time". Controlling System Costs: Basic and Advanced Scheduling Manuals and Contemporary Issues in Transit Scheduling. Report (Transit Cooperative Research Program). Transportation Research Board. ISBN 978-0-309-11783-8.
