= Hail and ride =

Boarding public transport by signalling to the driver

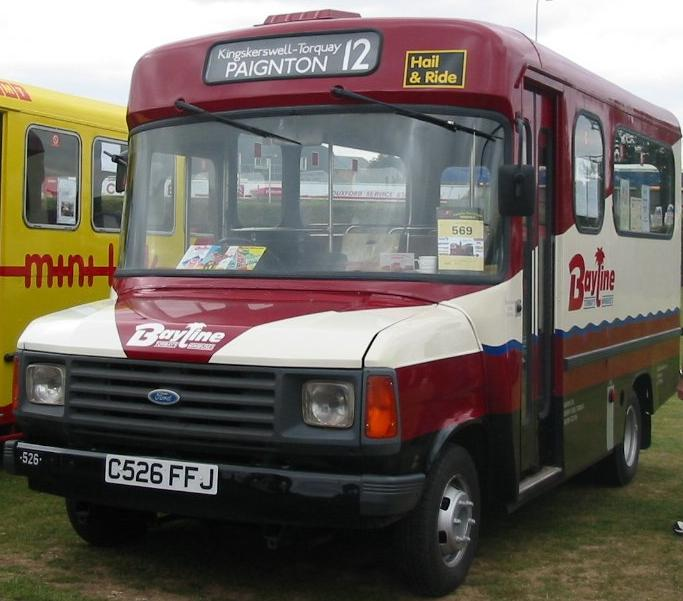
A preserved minibus of Devon General, displaying a Hail and Ride sticker

In public transport in the United Kingdom and Australia, hail and ride is a boarding or alighting mode of public transport by signalling the driver or conductor that one wishes to board or alight, rather than the more conventional system of using a designated stop. Hail and ride is used primarily in bus transport. The act of requesting a hackney carriage to stop is also termed 'hailing'.

In bus transport, sections of a route may or may not have regular bus stops, but the bus can be requested to stop anywhere that it is safe to do so, whether there is a bus shelter or not. This is different from the transit bus practice employed in some areas, whereby although a stop may exist, it may be a request stop where the bus is not required to stop unless the passenger indicates they wish to catch the bus, for instance by holding out their arm at the stop, or indicates they wish to get off, for example by pressing a button to ring the 'stop' bell.

Hail and Ride is usually employed in rural areas, or in non-main roads such as housing estates. This usually involves routes using minibuses, microbuses or midibuses which can navigate these roads easily, although some commuter coach routes may also operate on a hail and ride basis at the residential end of their route.

As well as allowing the use of smaller roads less accessible to larger buses, a hail and ride scheme gives the advantage of not having to build bus stop infrastructure in order to introduce or vary a route. To take advantage of some housing estate road layouts, hail and ride may be used at the estate end of a route where the bus traverses the estate in a circular route and returning the other way, rather than ending at a specific terminus stop.

Sometimes a hail and ride section will be augmented with 'official stops', which are merely posts with a route flag and timetable box, to inform passengers of the existence of the service, rather than a purpose-built shelter or lay-by.

The Hail and Ride concept has been extended and forms a part of demand responsive transport schemes.

It may be appropriate to retain 'Hail & Ride' operation:

- on lightly used services;
- on routes where passenger demand is very scattered; or
- where local conditions make installation of bus stops difficult (i.e. narrow pavements).

The hail and ride concept is adopted in Hong Kong by many minibus routes, although they may also have some sign posts along their routes, and a minority of operators do encourage their customers to get on and off at these stops.

== See also ==
- Marshrutka, Russian equivalent
