= Goose Creek (Louisville, Kentucky) =

Coordinates: 38°18′58″N 85°38′58″W

Location
- Country: United States
- State: Kentucky

Physical characteristics
- Mouth: Ohio River
  - location: Goose Creek, Kentucky

Goose Creek is a small stream in the Louisville Metro area (the former Jefferson County) of the U.S. state of Kentucky. It is a tributary of the Ohio River.

It is the namesake of the incorporated city of Goose Creek and the Louisville neighborhood of the same name, which lie beside its confluence with the Ohio.

== See also ==
- List of rivers of Kentucky
- Geography of Louisville, Kentucky
