= Ten Broeck, Kentucky =

- City
- Location of Ten Broeck in Jefferson County, Kentucky

- Location within the state of Kentucky Ten Broeck (the United States)
- Coordinates: 38°17′52″N 85°34′50″W
- Country: United States
- State: Kentucky
- County: Jefferson

Area
  - Total: 0.22 sq mi (0.57 km^{2})
  - Land: 0.22 sq mi (0.56 km^{2})
  - Water: 0.0039 sq mi (0.01 km^{2})
- Elevation: 587 ft (179 m)

Population (2020)
  - Total: 99
  - Density: 455/sq mi (175.7/km^{2})
- Time zone: UTC-5 (Eastern (EST))
  - Summer (DST): UTC-4 (EDT)
- ZIP Code: 40241
- FIPS code: 21-75963
- GNIS feature ID: 2405578

Ten Broeck is a home rule-class city in Jefferson County, Kentucky, United States. As of the 2020 census, Ten Broeck had a population of 99.

== Geography ==
Ten Broeck is located in northeastern Jefferson County. It is bordered to the west by Manor Creek and Broeck Pointe, to the southwest by Murray Hill, and on all other sides by consolidated Louisville/Jefferson County. Kentucky Route 22 (Brownsboro Road) forms the northern border of the community. Downtown Louisville is 11 miles (18 km) to the southwest.

According to the United States Census Bureau, Ten Broeck has a total area of 0.22 square miles (0.57 km^{2}), of which 1.4 acres (5,624 m^{2}), or 0.99%, are water.

== Demographics ==
Historical population
Census	Pop.	Note	%±
1980	134		—
1990	128		−4.5%
2000	129		0.8%
2010	103		−20.2%
2020	99		−3.9%
U.S. Decennial Census

As of the census of 2000, there were 129 people, 47 households, and 39 families residing in the city. The population density was 537.3 inhabitants per square mile (207.5/km^{2}). There were 48 housing units at an average density of 199.9 per square mile (77.2/km^{2}). The racial makeup of the city was 94.57% White, 1.55% African American, 2.33% Asian, and 1.55% from two or more races. Hispanic or Latino of any race were 0.78% of the population.

There were 47 households, out of which 38.3% had children under the age of 18 living with them, 78.7% were married couples living together, 2.1% had a female householder with no husband present, and 17.0% were non-families. 14.9% of all households were made up of individuals, and 8.5% had someone living alone who was 65 years of age or older. The average household size was 2.74 and the average family size was 3.08.

In the city, the population was spread out, with 25.6% under the age of 18, 5.4% from 18 to 24, 16.3% from 25 to 44, 35.7% from 45 to 64, and 17.1% who were 65 years of age or older. The median age was 46 years. For every 100 females, there were 98.5 males. For every 100 females age 18 and over, there were 108.7 males.

The median income for a household in the city was $134,063, and the median income for a family was $138,174. Males had a median income of $100,000 versus $82,038 for females. The per capita income for the city was $51,593. None of the population and none of the families were below the poverty line.
