= Brownsboro Farm, Kentucky =

- City
- Location of Brownsboro Farm in Jefferson County, Kentucky

- Location within the state of Kentucky Brownsboro Farm (the United States)
- Coordinates: 38°18′14″N 85°35′40″W
- Country: United States
- State: Kentucky
- County: Jefferson

Area
  - Total: 0.23 sq mi (0.59 km^{2})
  - Land: 0.23 sq mi (0.59 km^{2})
  - Water: 0 sq mi (0.00 km^{2})
- Elevation: 594 ft (181 m)

Population (2020)
  - Total: 640
  - Density: 2,815.0/sq mi (1,086.88/km^{2})
- Time zone: UTC-5 (Eastern (EST))
  - Summer (DST): UTC-4 (EDT)
- ZIP Code: 40241
- FIPS code: 21-10162
- GNIS feature ID: 2403938
- Website: brownsborofarm.org

Brownsboro Farm is a home rule-class city in Jefferson County, Kentucky, United States. As of the 2020 census, Brownsboro Farm had a population of 640.

== Geography ==
Brownsboro Farm is located in northeastern Jefferson County. It is bordered to the southwest by Barbourmeade and on all other sides by Louisville. Interstate 71 forms the northern border, though with no direct access, while Kentucky Route 22 (Brownsboro Road) forms the southern boundary. Downtown Louisville is 10 miles (16 km) to the southwest.

According to the United States Census Bureau, the city has a total area of 0.23 square miles (0.59 km^{2}), all land.

== Demographics ==
Historical population
Census	Pop.	Note	%±
1970	823		—
1980	790		−4.0%
1990	670		−15.2%
2000	676		0.9%
2010	648		−4.1%
2020	640		−1.2%
U.S. Decennial Census

At the 2000 census there were 676 people in 235 households, including 211 families, in the city. The population density was 3,944.6 inhabitants per square mile (1,523.0/km^{2}). There were 240 housing units at an average density of 1,400.5 per square mile (540.7/km^{2}). The racial makeup of the city was 96.30% White, 0.59% Black or African American, 0.44% Native American, 1.04% Asian, 0.59% from other races, and 1.04% from two or more races. Hispanic or Latino of any race were 0.89%.

Of the 235 households 37.9% had children under the age of 18 living with them, 79.6% were married couples living together, 8.9% had a female householder with no husband present, and 10.2% were non-families. 8.5% of households were one person and 6.4% were one person aged 65 or older. The average household size was 2.88 and the average family size was 3.03.

The age distribution was 27.7% under the age of 18, 4.6% from 18 to 24, 21.3% from 25 to 44, 30.5% from 45 to 64, and 16.0% 65 or older. The median age was 43 years. For every 100 females, there were 93.1 males. For every 100 females age 18 and over, there were 88.1 males.

The median household income was $76,445 and the median family income was $80,000. Males had a median income of $52,396 versus $37,143 for females. The per capita income for the city was $30,807. None of the families and 0.6% of the population were living below the poverty line, including no under eighteens and none of those over 64.
