= Schedule padding =

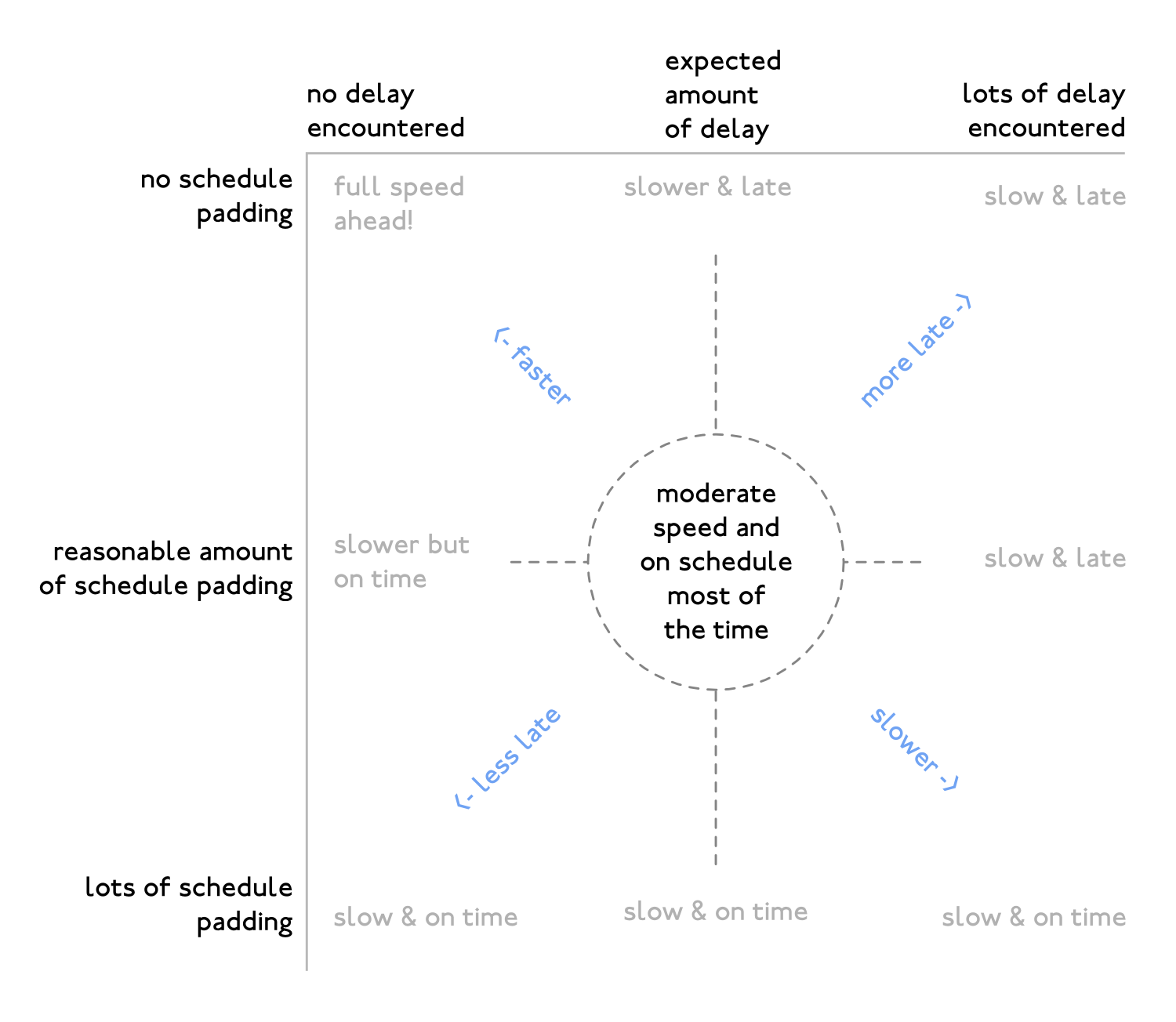
Diagram showing the relation between schedule padding and expected delay

Schedule padding—sometimes called simply padding, or recovery time—is some amount of "additional" time added to part or all of a schedule, in excess of the expected duration, that allows it to be resilient to anticipated delays and increase the chance that the published schedule will be met. In some cases, excessive padding may be intentionally added to make it unlikely that the schedule won't be met, or to prefabricate an earlier-than-scheduled completion. Padding may have only a temporary positive impact, and many clients perceive this as a deceptive strategy.

In transportation, airlines and public transit agencies often use schedule padding to improve schedule adherence and on-time performance, as the percentage of on-time trips is typically a key performance indicator for operators.

In project management or project planning, padding is added to a project schedule to account for known risks and other unforeseen circumstances that may prevent a project from being delivered on time.

== Public transportation ==
Schedule padding is, naturally enough, required only for transportation that operates on a fixed, published schedule, including rail transport, bus transport and airlines, or if timed connections are important, as in many areas of passenger and freight transportation in which things that are being carried need to be transferred to another vehicle. It is not correct, therefore, to think of something like a taxi as operating with schedule padding.

In most public transportation schedules, a number of timed stops may be strung together into a route, and some amount of schedule padding may be added for each part of the trip. If a vehicle encounters little delay, there may be unnecessary dwell time or intentional slow running if a transit vehicle must not pass a timed stop before it is scheduled to do so. For simple trips with no intermediate stops, schedule padding may be relatively negligible; if a vehicle encounters little delay it may simply arrive at its destination earlier than scheduled.

A conservatively-padded schedule can substantially reduce overall speeds and increase travel times beyond what might have been necessary. Excessive padding may also prevent passengers from making connections that would be possible if not for the padding. It is important, therefore, to think about the probability and distribution of certain types of delay events and the desired degree of on-time performance when padding in public transport timetables is established.

In the United Kingdom, railway operators include schedule padding in the internal working timetables, shown as recovery time.

== Air travel ==
In air travel, as delays are both common and potentially expensive, the scheduled flight time is usually increased to about 110% of the expected flight time, however some airlines are reportedly now padding by as much as 50%.

Departure delays are easily caused by passengers arriving late at the gate or unexpected business at the airport. Delayed flights can cause knock-on effects in terms of missing departure slots, which may be a problem in busy airspaces in which the departure time is not only determined by the schedule of the departure airport, but also the sectors the aircraft has to fly through. By padding the schedule, the aircraft is less likely to miss slots in airspaces it has to fly through, and may still arrive on time (or even ahead of schedule) at the destination airport even with a small departure and/or enroute delay. In addition, aircraft usually fly multiple flights in short succession; hence, a delay may cause later flights with the same aircraft to be delayed, or additional aircraft to be chartered on short notice.

When no delays are encountered, schedule padding can give the impression that a flight has arrived early at its destination. However, the plane may be required to wait for an available gate or other ground services such as aircraft marshalling.

Conservative flight arrival times also help airlines reduce their financial liability under the Flight Compensation Regulation 261/2004, as compensation for delays is calculated based on the scheduled arrival time published by the airline. Moreover, financial costs can be incurred if passengers miss their connections, and airlines may incur punctuality penalties.

Negative publicity may also arise through metrics such as lower on-time performance, which are published by some countries. However these metrics should be met with some scepticism. In 2017, Hong Kong Airlines was able to become the world's most punctual airline by simply adding up to 30 minutes to the scheduled arrival time on several routes, rather than improving their actual on-time performance.
