= Goose Creek, Kentucky =

- City
- Location of Goose Creek in Jefferson County, Kentucky

- Location within the state of Kentucky Goose Creek (the United States)
- Coordinates: 38°17′36″N 85°35′26″W
- Country: United States
- State: Kentucky
- County: Jefferson
- Named for: a local stream

Area
  - Total: 0.062 sq mi (0.16 km^{2})
  - Land: 0.062 sq mi (0.16 km^{2})
  - Water: 0 sq mi (0.00 km^{2})
- Elevation: 643 ft (196 m)

Population (2020)
  - Total: 303
  - Density: 4,900.5/sq mi (1,892.11/km^{2})
- Time zone: UTC-5 (Eastern (EST))
  - Summer (DST): UTC-4 (EDT)
- ZIP Code: 40241
- FIPS code: 21-31870
- GNIS feature ID: 2403713

Goose Creek is a home rule-class city in Jefferson County, Kentucky, United States. As of the 2020 census, Goose Creek had a population of 303.

== Geography ==
Goose Creek is located in northeastern Jefferson County. It is bordered to the northwest by Barbourmeade, to the northeast by Broeck Pointe, to the south by Murray Hill, and to the north, southeast, and west by consolidated Louisville/Jefferson County. It is 11 miles (18 km) northeast of downtown Louisville.

According to the United States Census Bureau, the city has a total area of 0.06 square miles (0.16 km^{2}), all land.

== History ==
The city is named for Goose Creek, which passes 1 mile (1.6 km) to the west of the city limits and flows northwest 4 miles (6 km) to its mouth at the Ohio River. The creek itself may have been named for wild geese observed in the area by early settlers, or for William Goose, a wagon maker who settled in the area in the late 18th century. The area was also known as "Florida Heights" by 1881 and continued under this name as late as 1912.

A local post office was established in 1892 and closed in 1902. The city was incorporated in 1969.

== Demographics ==
Historical population
| Census | Pop. | Note | %± |
|---|---|---|---|
| 1970 | 450 | | — |
| 1980 | 361 | | −19.8% |
| 1990 | 321 | | −11.1% |
| 2000 | 272 | | −15.3% |
| 2010 | 294 | | 8.1% |
| 2020 | 303 | | 3.1% |
U.S. Decennial Census

As of the census of 2000, there were 272 people, 115 households, and 93 families residing in the city. The population density was 4,012.9 inhabitants per square mile (1,549.4/km^{2}). There were 115 housing units at an average density of 1,696.6 per square mile (655.1/km^{2}). The racial makeup of the city was 95.96% White, 1.47% Black or African American, 0.37% from other races, and 2.21% from two or more races. Hispanic or Latino of any race were 2.21% of the population.

There were 115 households, out of which 24.3% had children under the age of 18 living with them, 76.5% were married couples living together, 4.3% had a female householder with no husband present, and 19.1% were non-families. 18.3% of all households were made up of individuals, and 13.0% had someone living alone who was 65 years of age or older. The average household size was 2.37 and the average family size was 2.68.

In the city, the population was spread out, with 19.1% under the age of 18, 2.6% from 18 to 24, 19.9% from 25 to 44, 31.3% from 45 to 64, and 27.2% who were 65 years of age or older. The median age was 50 years. For every 100 females, there were 88.9 males. For every 100 females age 18 and over, there were 88.0 males.

The median income for a household in the city was $66,250, and the median income for a family was $87,500. Males had a median income of $53,750 versus $36,563 for females. The per capita income for the city was $34,124. None of the families and 0.7% of the population were living below the poverty line, including no under eighteens and 2.8% of those over 64.
