= Timing point =

Transit stop designated as scheduling target

A timing point, time point or timepoint is a public transit stop that a vehicle tries to reach at a scheduled time. The vehicle should stay at timepoints and not supposed to pass until the schedule time has arrived. These stops are contrasted with all other stops on a scheduled route, for which the transit agency does not explicitly schedule an arrival/departure time. These other stops occur between timepoint stops, so their scheduled times are implicitly between those of the timepoints though not explicitly defined. At minimum, it allows regular passengers to estimate when a bus would get to a stop before or after a timepoint.

The creation of digital schedules, and real-time geo-located apps has somewhat complicated the situation for agencies operating with timepoints. These apps usually ingest GTFS (General Transit Feed Specification) data, a widely used schedule data format, which often include times for every single stop on a route. Agencies may interpolate between their timepoints, but this may not reflect a realistic expectation of when a vehicle should arrive, and the GTFS specification cautions against this practice.

Whilst normal bus stops may interrupt a (painted) bike lane or a driveway may be blocked by a stopped bus, these features are not permissible for timing points. A bus bulb, where buses stop in a traffic lane, is also not suitable for a timing point.
