= Nissan Diesel Big Thumb =

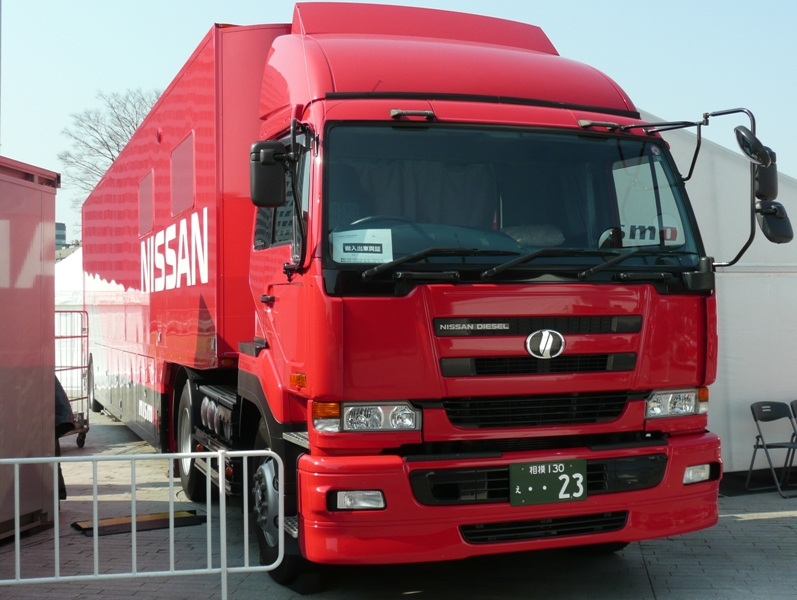

Overview
- Manufacturer: UD (Nissan Diesel)
- Also called: Samsung SM510/530, Nissan Diesel Convoy/CWM (Southeast Asia)
- Production: 1990–2005 (Japan); 1990–2014 (International); 1994–2000 (South Korea)

Body and chassis
- Class: Truck
- Body style: Truck (standard cab (Worldwide), high roof, crew cab (Australia only))

Powertrain
- Engine: PF6-T, RE8, RF8/RF8-T, RG8, RH8, RE10, RF10, RH10, GE13-T, MD92-T
- Transmission: 7-speed manual ESCOT-II 12-speed semi-automatic ESCOT-III 7/12-speed automatic ESCOT-AT IV 12-speed automatic ESCOT-Plus 1 12-speed semi-automatic

Chronology
- Predecessor: Nissan Diesel C-series
- Successor: Nissan Diesel Quon; UD Quester (for CWM variant)

The Nissan Diesel Big Thumb (Japanese: 日産ディーゼル・ビッグサム) is a heavy-duty commercial vehicle that was produced by the Japanese manufacturer Nissan Diesel (now UD Trucks) and sold between 1990 and 2014, although Japanese sales ended in 2005, a few months after it had been replaced by the Nissan Diesel Quon. Unlike its predecessor, the Nissan Diesel C-series, the Big Thumb was primarily available as a full-size truck.

Most heavier-duty models of the truck are distinguishable by a front 'Big Thumb' badge, but the common Nissan Diesel or UD badge is usually used on the rear.

The Big Thumb was facelifted in 2000 and 2002. The Big Thumb's principal competitors were the Mitsubishi Fuso Super Great, Isuzu Giga and Hino Profia. The Big Thumb has been succeeded by the Nissan Diesel Quon.

In Southeast Asia (Thailand, Malaysia, and Indonesia), a variant of this truck was sold as the Nissan Diesel Convoy/CWM series which uses Nissan Diesel Condor cabin but with mechanicals, engines, and drivelines from Nissan Diesel Big Thumb or Resona. The CWM was eventually succeeded by the UD Quester.

== Lineup ==
- CD : 6x2
- CG : 8x4
- NCK : 4x2
- CW : 6x4
- CV : 6x2 ( 2 Front Axle )
- CF : 4x4
- CZ : 6x6
- CK-T : 4x2
- CW-T : 6x4
- CW-Z : 6x4
- CW-X : 6x4
- MK : 4x2
- CKA : 6x4
- CKB : 4x2
- CDA : 6x2
- CWB : 6x4
- CGB : 8x4
- CD450 : 8x4

== Engine ==
Engine model	Power	Torque	Displacement	Cylinders	Bore x stroke	Aspiration
FE6	220 PS at 2,100 rpm	941 Nm at 1,200 rpm	6,925 cc	I6	108 x 126 mm	Naturally aspirated
PE6	230 PS at 2,100 rpm	961 Nm at 1,200 rpm	11,670 cc	I6	133 x 140 mm	Naturally aspirated
PE6-T	280 PS at 2,100 rpm	1,078 Nm at 1,200 rpm	11,670 cc	I6	133 x 140 mm	Turbocharged
PF6-TA	320 PS at 2,100 rpm	1,294 Nm at 1,200 rpm	12,503 cc	I6	133 x 150 mm	Turbocharged & intercooled
PF6-TB	350 PS at 2,100 rpm	1,393 Nm at 1,200 rpm	12,503 cc	I6	133 x 150 mm	Turbocharged & Intercooled
PF6-TC	375 PS at 2,100 rpm	1,665 Nm at 1,200 rpm	12,503 cc	I6	133 x 150 mm	Turbocharged & Intercooled
RE8	295 PS at 2,200 rpm	1,029 Nm at 1,400 rpm	15,115 cc	V8	135 x 132 mm	Naturally aspirated
RF8	340 PS at 2,200 rpm	1,177 Nm at 1,400 rpm	16,991 cc	V8	138 x 142 mm	Naturally aspirated
RH8	430 PS at 2,200 rpm	1,393 Nm at 1,200 rpm	21,205 cc	V8	150 x 150 mm	Naturally aspirated
RE10	370 PS at 2,200 rpm	1,274 Nm at 1,400 rpm	18,894 cc	V10	135 x 132 mm	Naturally aspirated
RG8	350 PS at 2,200 rpm	1,225 Nm at 1,400 rpm	17,990 cc	V8	142 x 142 mm	Naturally aspirated
RF10	395 PS at 2,200 rpm	1,393 Nm at 1,400 rpm	21,230 cc	V10	138 x 142 mm	Naturally aspirated
RF10	420 PS at 2,200 rpm	1,393 Nm at 1,400 rpm	21,230 cc	V10	138 x 142 mm	Naturally aspirated
RH10	520 PS at 2,100 rpm [450 PS, 470 PS]	1,814 Nm at 1,200 rpm	26,507 cc	V10	150 x 150 mm	Naturally aspirated
RF8-TB	480 PS at 2,100 rpm	2,059 Nm at 1,200 rpm	16,991 cc	V8	138 x 142 mm	Twin-turbocharged & Intercooled
MD92-TB (CWM only)	330 PS at 2,200 rpm	1,324 Nm at 1,400 rpm	9,200 cc	I6	125 x 125 mm	Turbocharged & Intercooled
GE13-TD	370 PS at 1,800 rpm	2,157 Nm at 1,200 rpm	13,074 cc	I6	136 x 150 mm	Turbocharged & Intercooled
