= CXZ =

CXZ may refer to:

- CXZ, a track in Private Music
- CXZ radar, a predecessor to CXAM radar
- Isuzu CXZ, a model of the Isuzu Giga heavy-duty commercial vehicle
