= Hino Profia =

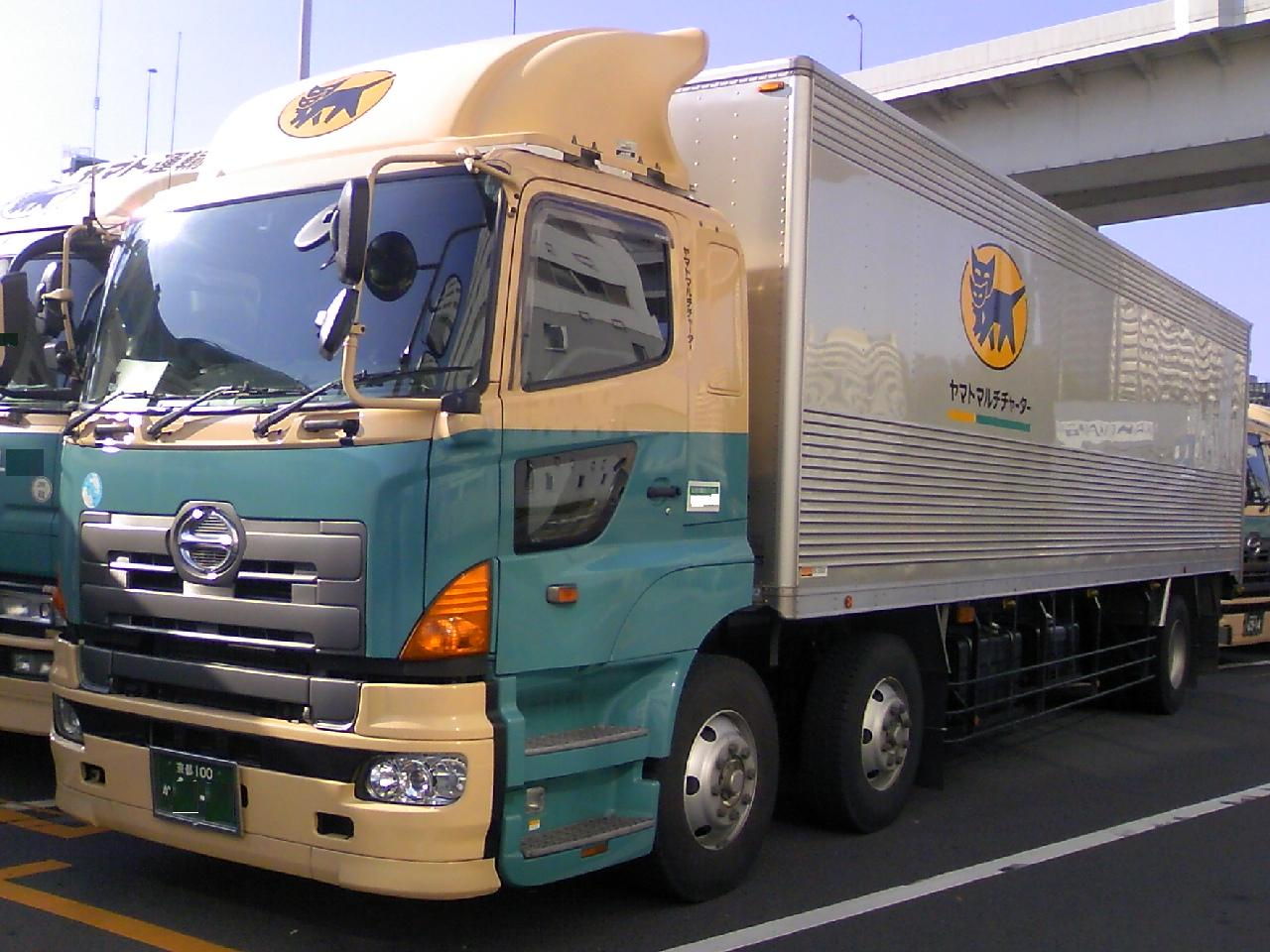

Overview
- Manufacturer: Hino
- Also called: Hino 700 Series; Hino 700 Splendor; Hino Super Dolphin; Hino Super Dolphin Profia; Kia Granto
- Production: 1981–present
- Assembly: Japan: Hino (Hino plant); Japan: Koga (Koga plant); Taiwan: Zhongli (Kuozui Motors); China: Guangzhou (GAC Hino); Indonesia: Purwakarta; Malaysia: Seremban; Philippines: Laguna; Ireland: Dublin (J. Harris Assemblers)

Body and chassis
- Class: Heavy truck
- Body style: Truck; standard cab (Worldwide) crew cab (Australia only)

Powertrain
- Transmission: Hino (manual, auto); ZF AS Tronic (automatic)

The Hino Profia (Japanese: 日野プロフィア) is a heavy duty cab-over truck produced by Hino Motors, a 50.1% subsidiary of Toyota Motor Corporation. It was introduced in 1981. In most export markets, it is also known as the Hino 700 Series. The name Profia is officially used in Japan, and was previously known as the Super Dolphin Profia. The Hino F-Series truck's model codes are FN, FP, FR, FS, and FW. The tractor head model codes are SH and SS, in Japan the truck’s traditional competitors are Isuzu Giga, Mitsubishi Fuso Super Great and UD Quon.

== Predecessors ==
=== Super Dolphin (1981–1992) ===
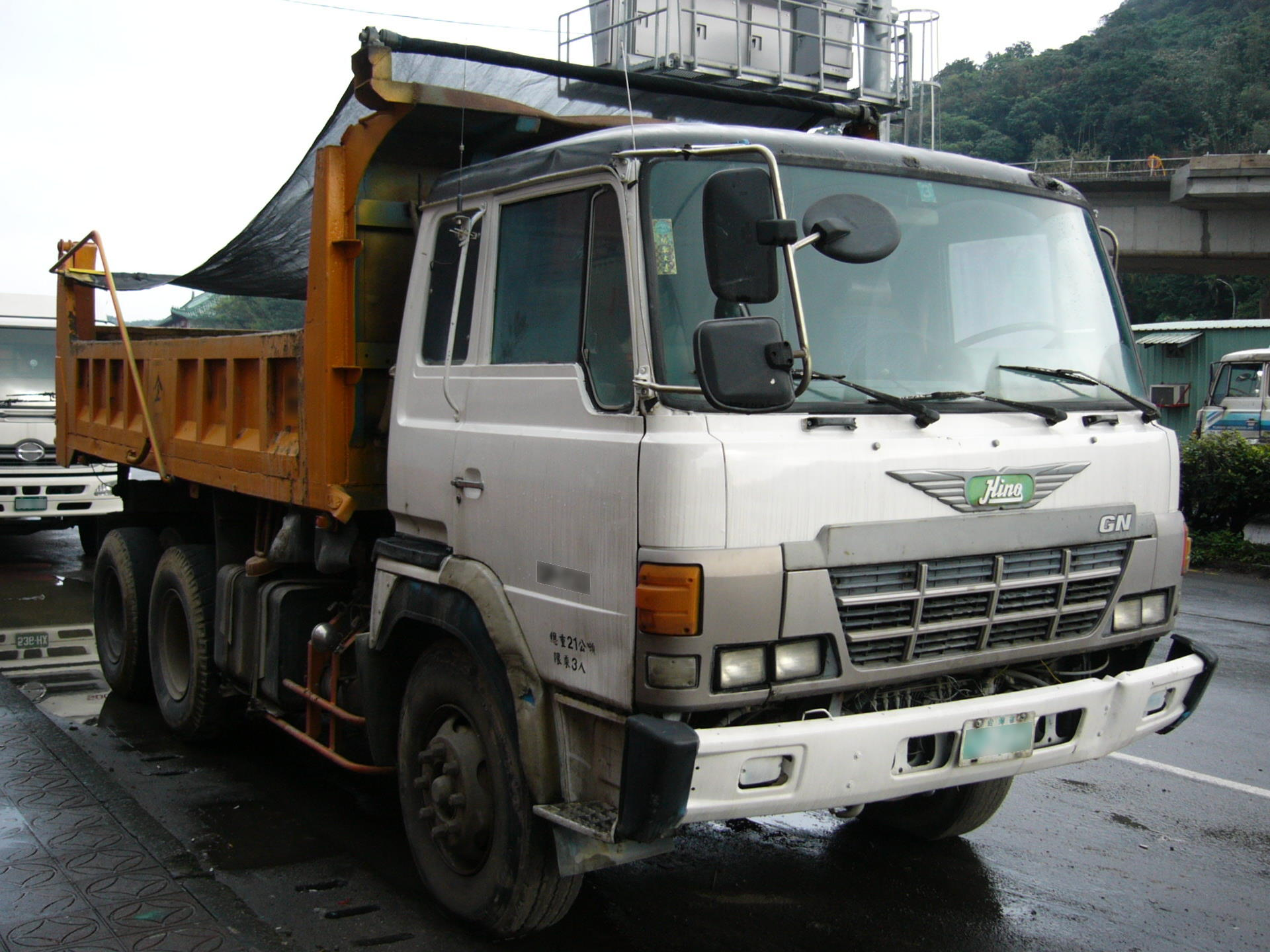
Hino Super Dolphin GN Dump Truck in Taiwan.

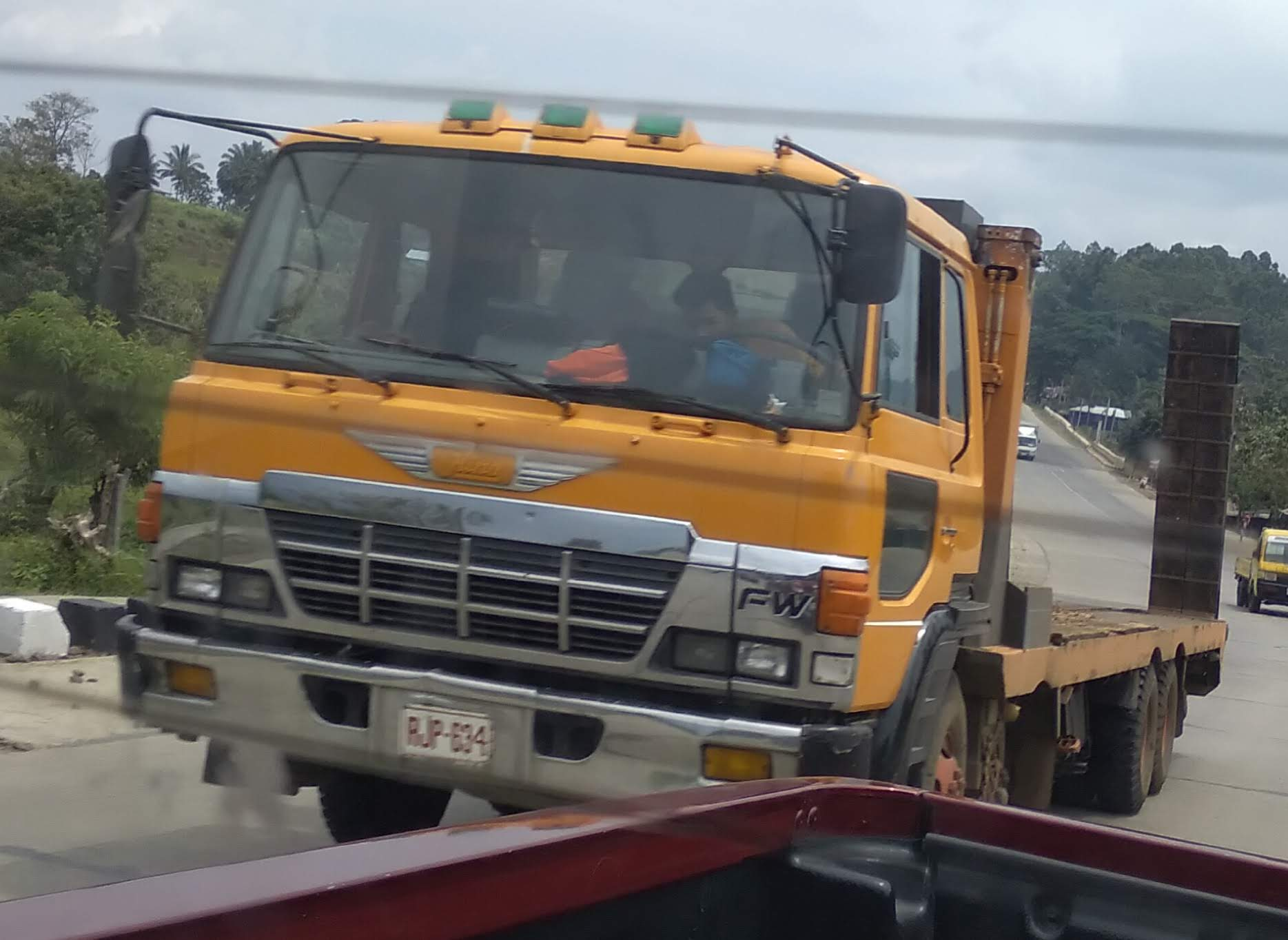
Hino Super Dolphin FW 8X4 Self-Loader truck in the Philippines (Export version)

Introduced in 1981, the Super Dolphin was Hino's entry into the heavy duty truck market in Japan, and exported internationally. The Super Dolphin had undergone 7 facelifts throughout the 80s, until the final generation in 1990.

=== Super Dolphin Profia (1992–2003) ===
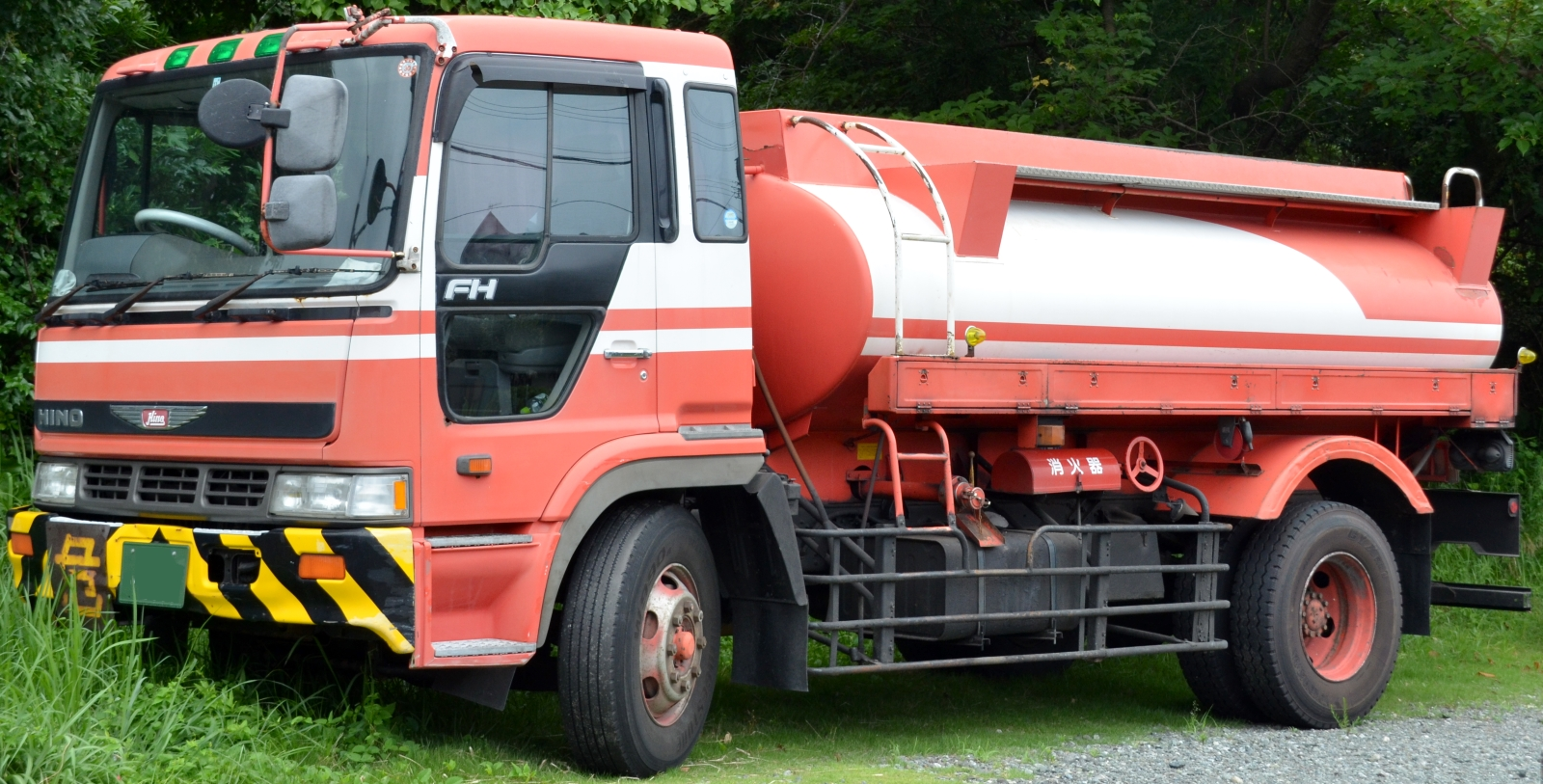
Hino Super Dolphin Profia FH in Japan.

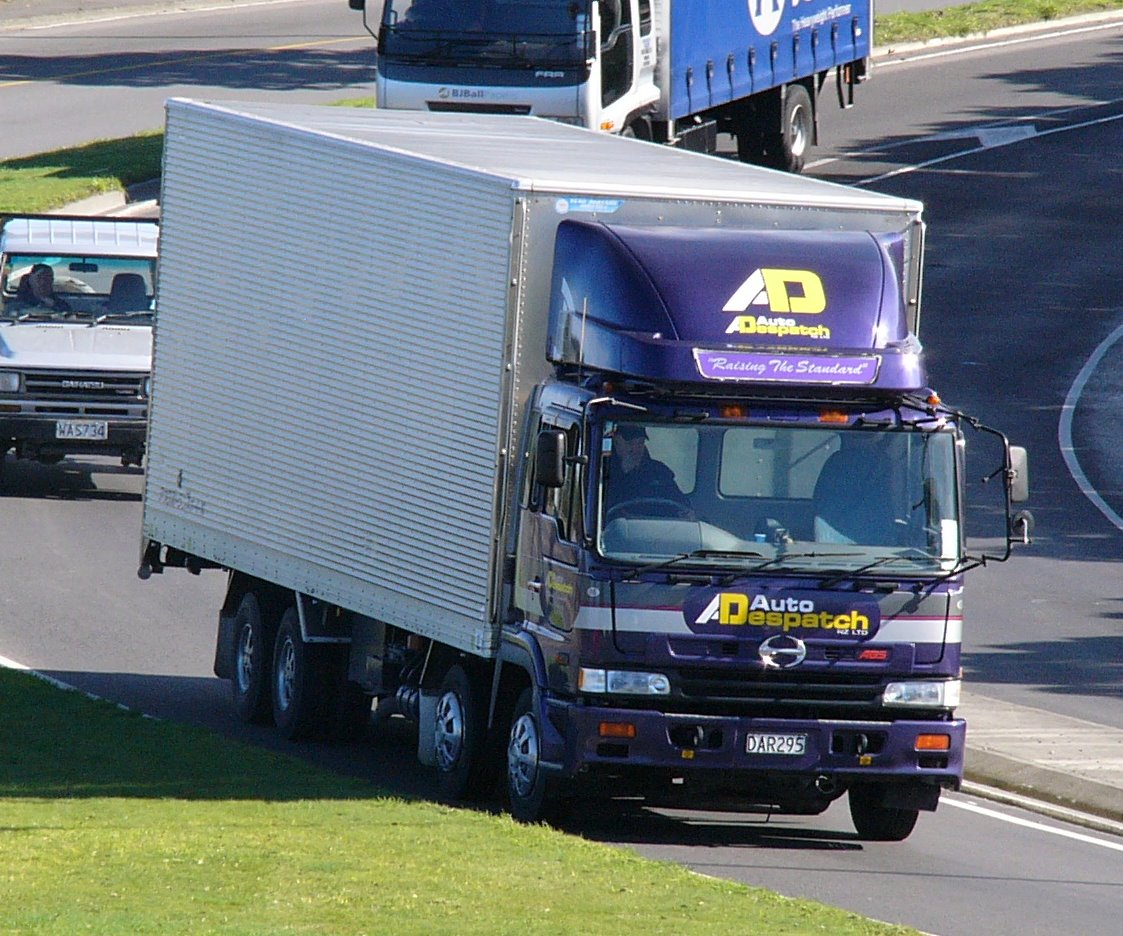
Facelift Hino Super Dolphin Profia equipped with ABS (as seen on the front) in New Zealand.

Introduced in May 1992 as a model change of the Super Dolphin. It is equivalent to the second generation of Super Dolphin. The styling has been redesigned to follow the cruising ranger style. The headlights, door windows, and turn signal lamps mounted on the front and cab doors are the same as the cruising ranger that appeared in advance.

Engine one-key operation is standard equipment. The V8 is equipped with F20C, F21C or F17D (330-560ps), and the straight-six engine is equipped with P11C (230-360ps) and K13C (290-560ps) / K13D (270 or 380ps).

The front grille with three holes lined up between the headlights like the late ZM model is a feature of the early model. The wing marks are slightly smaller and are discreetly placed on the front grille. It also has a new HINO logo. It was also equipped with power windows (including a sliding power window), unusual for trucks at the time. The driver's window is an elevating type, and the passenger side is a sliding one.

The catch phrase is "Full model change of transportation culture" and "Toward the 21st century of logistics". Actor Koji Yakusho was appointed as a commercial spokesman.

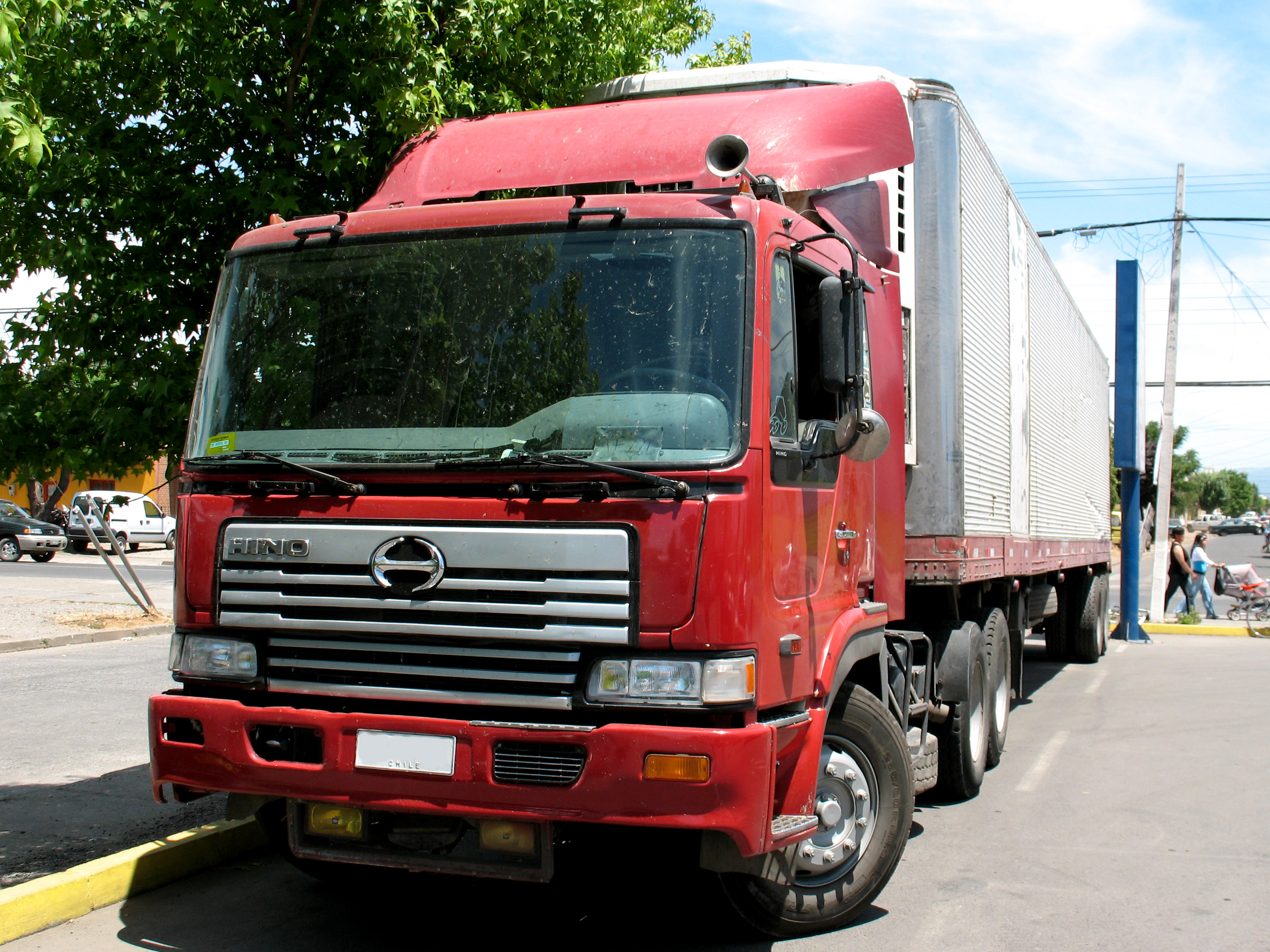
Hino Super Dolphin Profia Tractor Head (with big grille) in Chile.

In August 1992, a semi-tractor was added. Like the Super Dolphin, the tractor was fitted with a large grille called the "trailer grill" on the front lid.

Minor change in 1994. Added L series (GVW22t / 25t). Compliant with 1994 emission regulations. The wing mark has been omitted, and a new HINO emblem and its H mark have been installed, and the front grille has also been changed. The notation of the door was changed from the car model name to the car model name. Due to KC regulations, the V-type engine series has changed from 300PS (320PS, 350PS) F17E to 330PS (360PS) F20C, 315PS F20C to 360PS (390PS, 430PS) F21C, 400PS V22D to 380PS V20C, and 480PS V25C to 520PS V26C... The back side of the headlight (from the center) is more rounded than the previous model. This change was also seen when the cruising ranger made a minor change to become a rising ranger. Also, from this point on, the tail lamps have been changed from Ichiko to Koito, which is similar to the trucks of the other three companies in Japan.

1998, minor change. The motorcycle was equipped with a special grille on the front lid, the part where the H mark was attached was blacked out, and the ABS emblem was attached. Discharge headlamp settings, driver airbags, and ABS are standard equipment on all models, and the front emblem is only the H mark. One of the features is that the bumper has a fog lamp.

The design of the semi-tractor was not changed at this time, and it was produced almost the same as the mid-term model with the addition of the ABS emblem and fog lamps. The subname of "Teravie" was given to the models with a gross vehicle weight of 22t and 25t. The catch phrase is "Teravie when it exceeds 20t". A common rail injection system is used for the K13C engine. In addition, the FW of the low-floor 4-axle vehicle unified all the tires of the 1st axis to 19.5 inches after the 2nd axis, and advanced the position of the 1st axis to the same position as the high-floor vehicle of the front 1 axis.

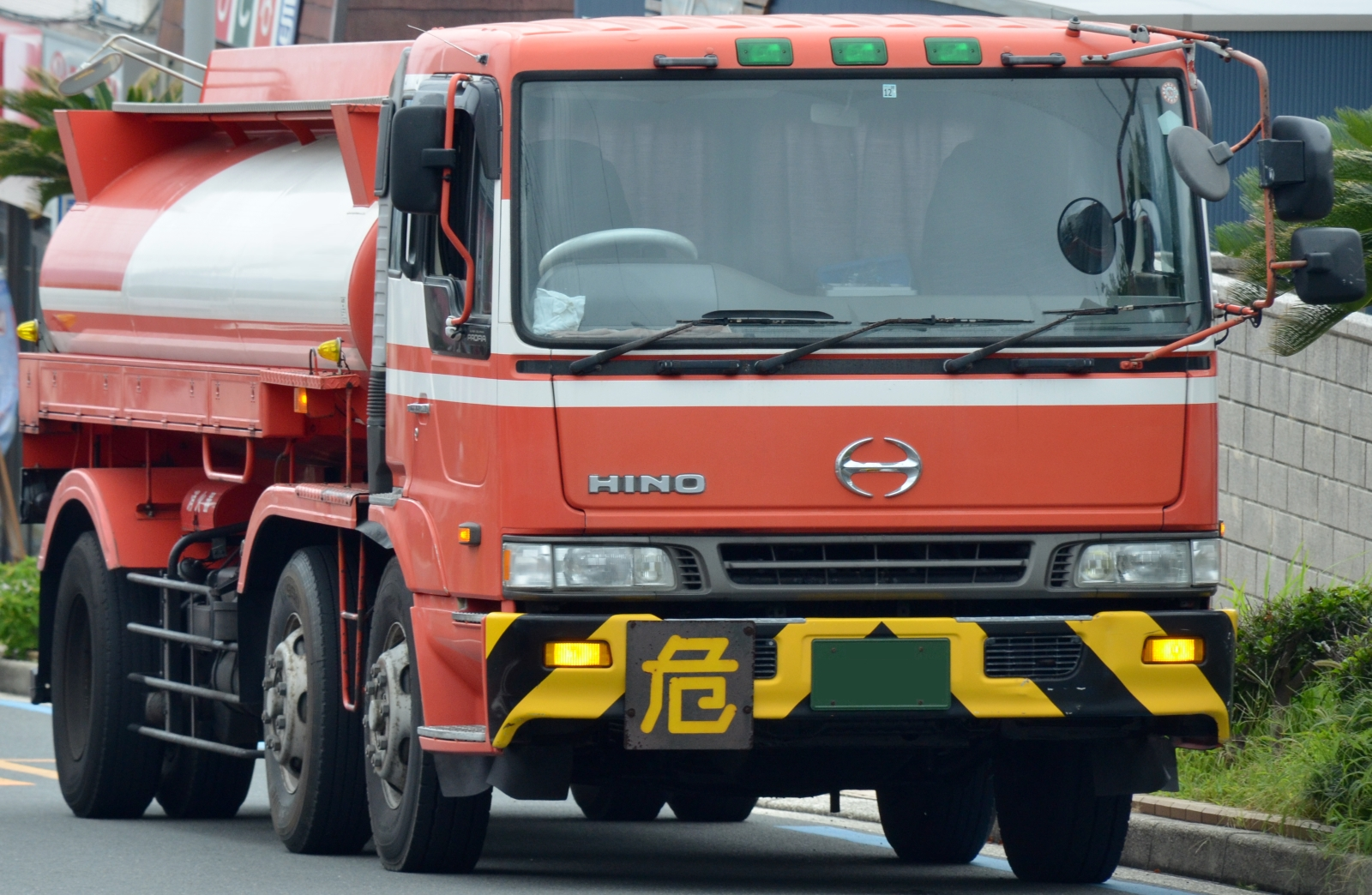
Facelift Hino Super Dolphin Profia GN in Japan.

2000, minor change. Known as the Teravie face. The grille on the front lid has two stages, and only the large front bumper with an air dam has been changed to a new design. The face design is common to cargo, special equipment, and semi-tractors. The turn signal / fog combination lamp that fits in the dedicated front bumper is based on the front turn signal of Isuzu Giga and the fog lamp is added. Therefore, the outer shape is the same. Compliant with the 1999 emission regulations, the door handle was changed from metal to resin, and the mechanical AT pro shift was set. The small type bumper without air dam, which is often found in dump trucks and mixer trucks, is a 1998-2000 model with a built-in fog. In addition, the chassis accessories of the semi-tractor have changed, and now it has a square muffler and a triple air tank. From this time on, the tractor was equipped with a high roof as standard equipment (the low roof was changed to an option on the tractor).

In October 2000, exhibited ASV-2 at the 34th Tokyo Motor Show.

Partially improved in 2002, and the V-type engine was abolished except for semi-tractors in compliance with noise regulations in 2002. The speed indicator was also abolished.

In October 2002, exhibited the Profia Tractor ASV at the 36th Tokyo Motor Show.

== Profia (2003–2017) ==
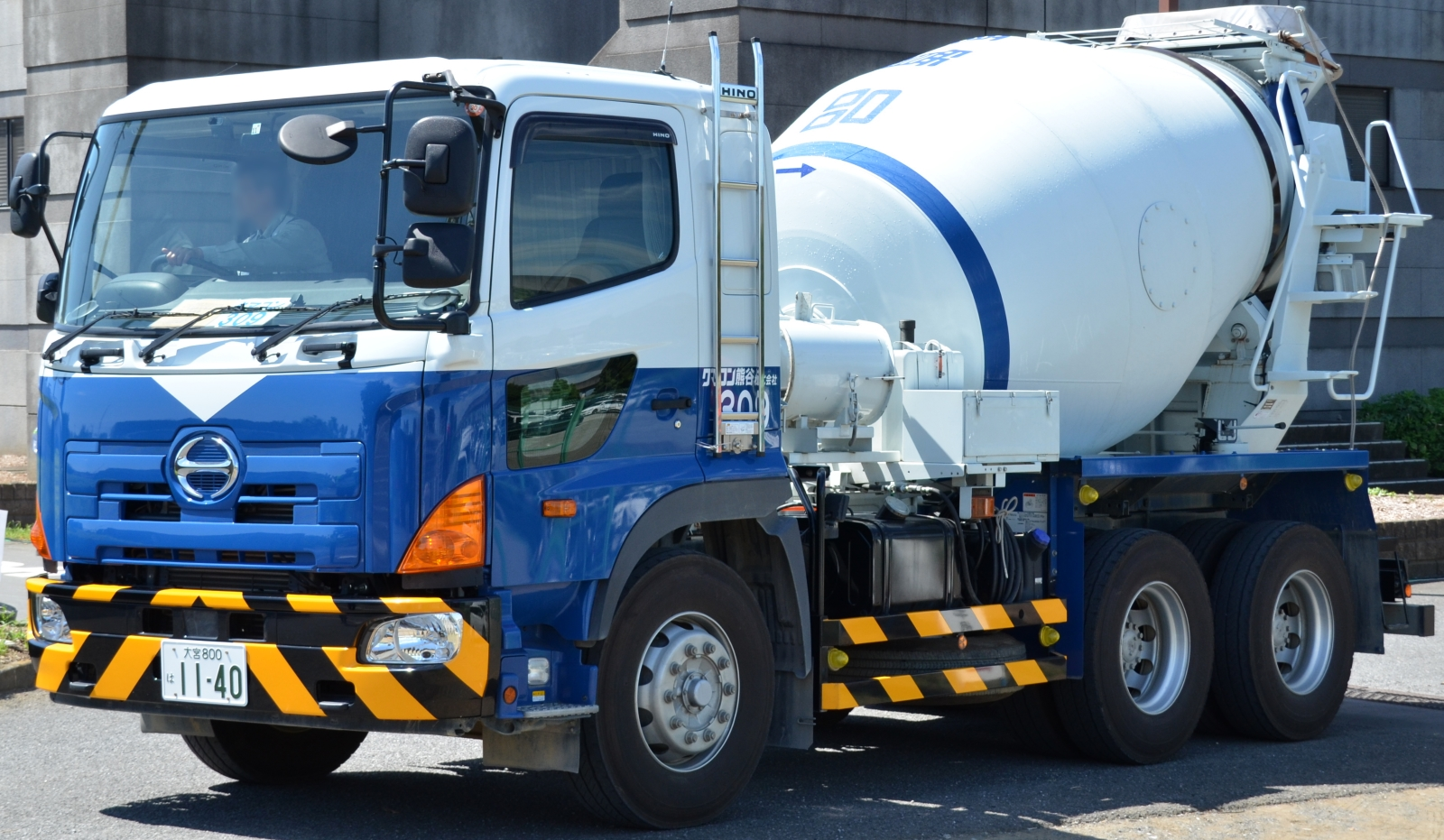
Hino Profia FS Mixer in Japan.

In October 2003, after the first full model change in 11 and a half years, it used to be a subname, but from this time it is simply changed to Profia. The engine complies with the new short-term emission regulations, and all cars including the tractor system are turbocharged with a straight-six intercooler. Vehicles equipped with DPR as a manufacturer's option have acquired the 85% reduction level (★ 4, PK-regulation) of the ultra-low PM emission diesel vehicle certification system. The accelerator / brake pedal has changed from an organ type to a hanging type that is common in passenger cars. In addition, the arrangement of the tail lamps has changed, and the triple type has become orange, red, and red from the outside (previously it was red, orange, and red). Vehicles equipped with double-type tail lamps, such as semi-tractors, have the same layout as before (red / orange from the outside). Basically, all cars are equipped with a high mount cab, and the design is based on that. However, for tank trucks, fire engines, and car carriers that require a low overall cab height, the structure can be made into a low-mount cab by omitting the spacer on the bumper and the fender under the door.

There are three types of driver's seats, and depending on the vehicle type, standard seats, air suspension seats, and high-performance seats from ISRING HAUSEN of Germany (licensed by Tachi -S) could be selected.

In October 2004, exhibited ASV tractor at the 38th Tokyo Motor Show.

Released in December 2005 in compliance with the 2005 emission regulations (new long-term emission regulations) (E13C engine vehicle)

In January 2006, the world's first rear-end collision damage mitigation braking system for heavy-duty trucks was added to some models.

In June 2006, some vehicle types were released that met the 2015 heavy vehicle fuel economy standards.

In April 2007, the engine of the vehicle equipped with the P11C type engine was changed to the newly developed A09C type engine to fully comply with the 2005 emission regulations. In addition, VSC (Electronic Vehicle Attitude Control System) is available as a manufacturer's option for the tractor system.

In October 2007, exhibited an ASV tractor at the 40th Tokyo Motor Show.

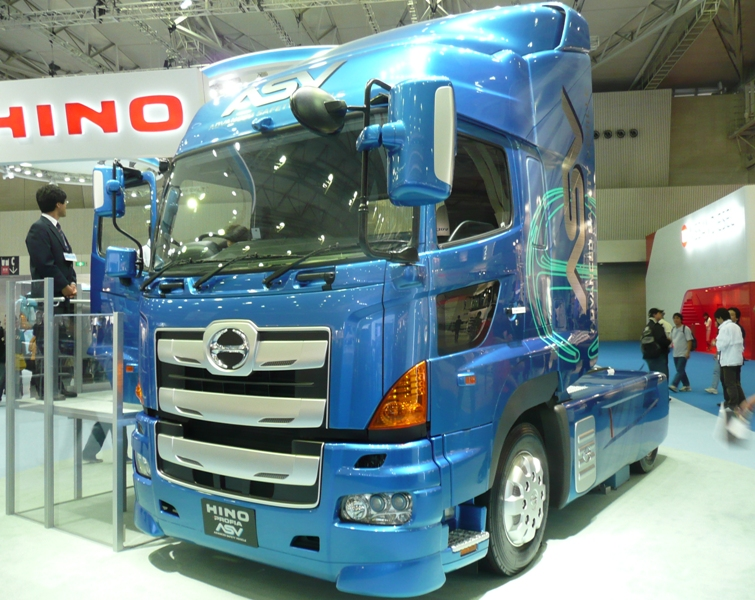
Profia 1848 ASV

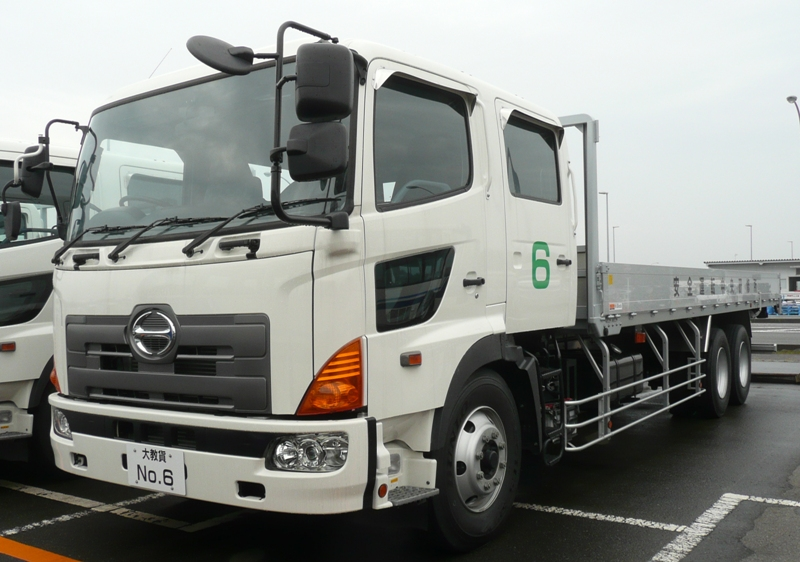
Profia 2636 double cab

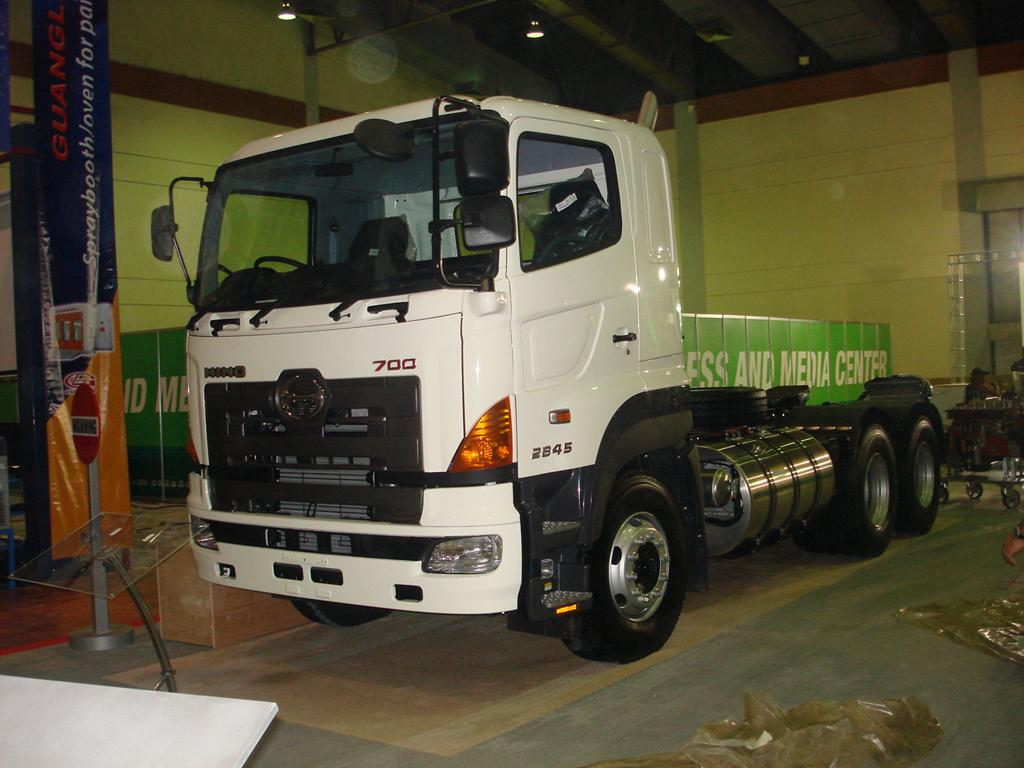
Hino SS 3348

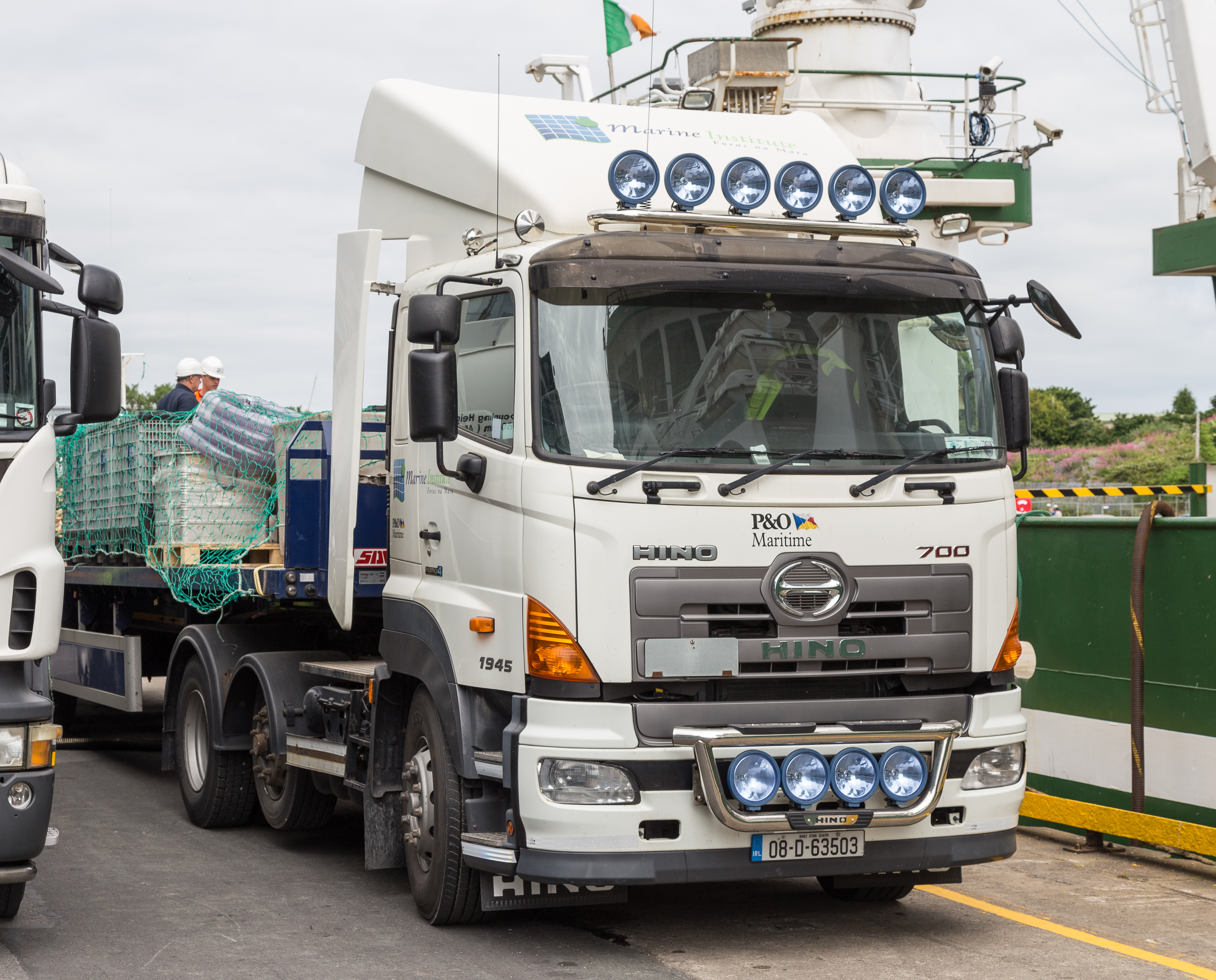
Hino 700 6x2

In April 2014, due to improvements in engine control and the addition of the inertial driving function "E-COAST" for vehicles equipped with Proshift 12, "vehicles that achieved the 2015 fuel efficiency standard value + 5% " except for some models. became. In addition, in terms of enhanced safety equipment functions, a rear-end collision avoidance support function has been added to the preceding vehicle for pre-crash safety, the accuracy of the lane departure warning system has been improved (standard equipment), and the driver monitor <alarm by detecting eye closure or face orientation>. Improvements such as improved accuracy (standard equipment), setting of left / right balance monitor to measure the tilt of the trailer (standard equipment for sea lane), and improvement of the auto shift down function of Proshift 12.

It will be exhibited at the Tokyo Auto Salon in January 2015. In February, it was exhibited at the Osaka Auto Messe and was exhibited together with the Dutro X. (Exhibited at both events in 2016 and 2017)

In October 2015, exhibited the Profia Hybrid at the 44th Tokyo Motor Show.

== 3rd generation Profia (2017–present) ==
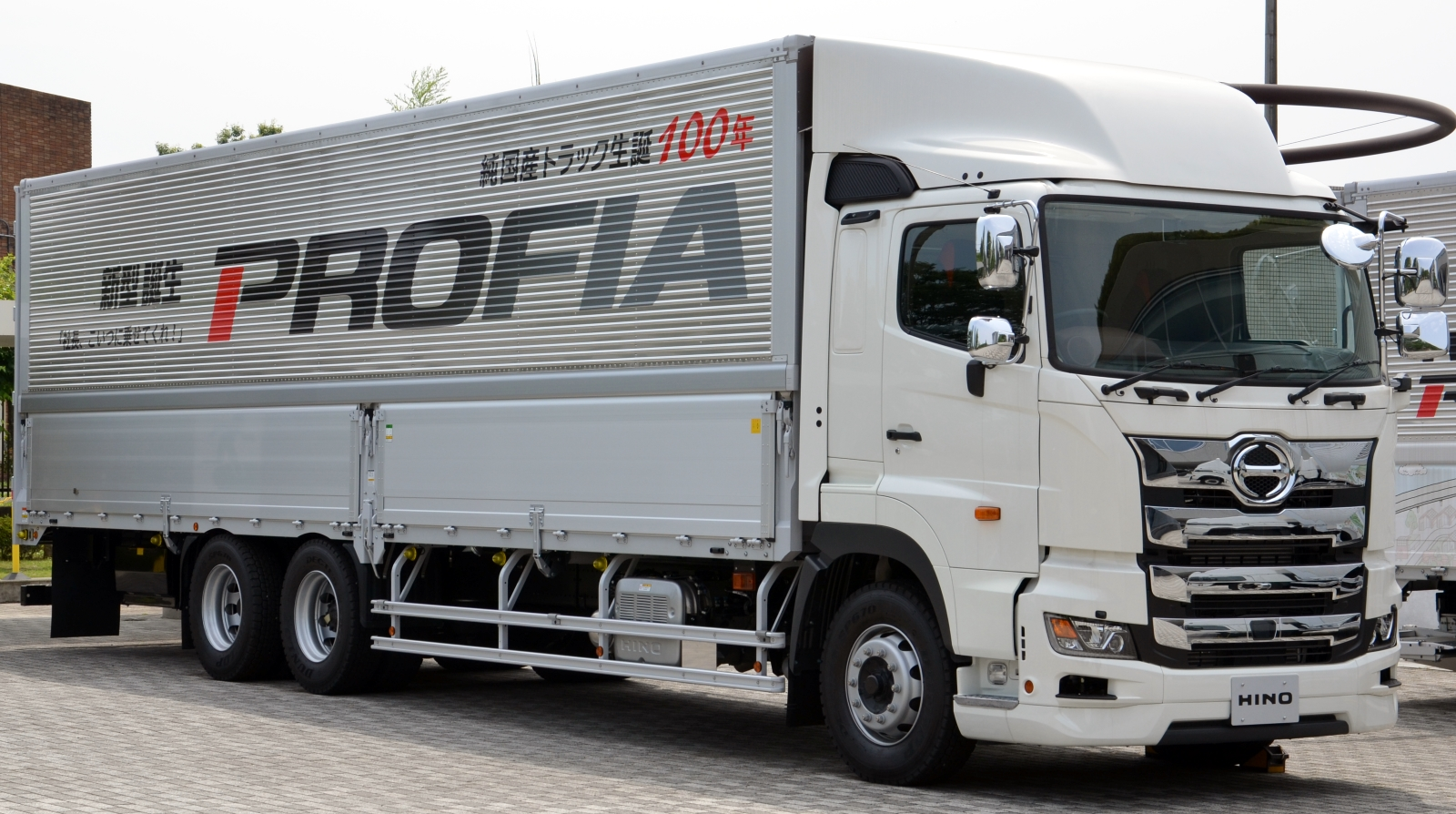
Hino Profia (3rd Generation) (Front)

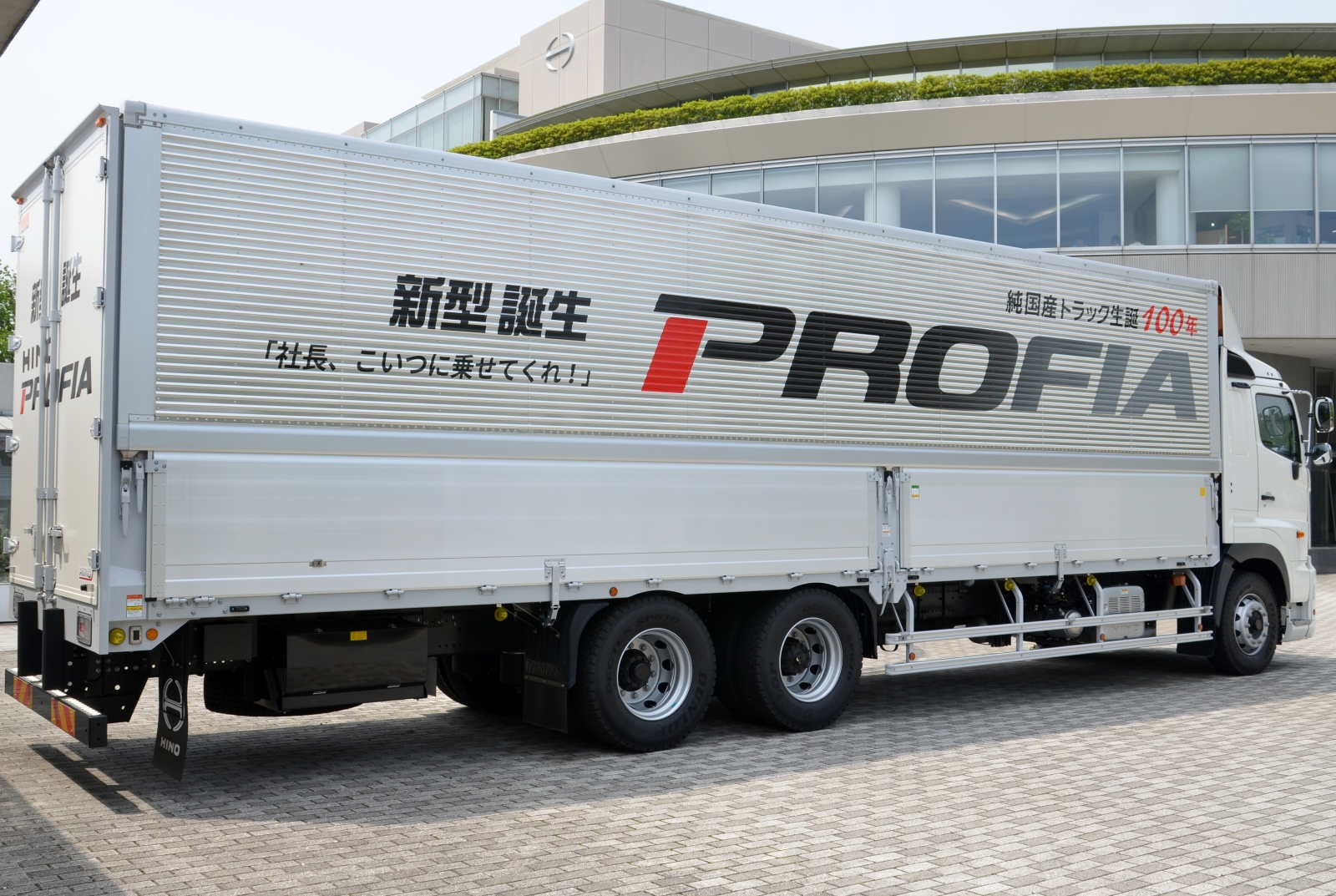
Rear

The New Hino Profia was Launched in April 2017 with new design, it is based on the 6th gen Hino Ranger, and it comes with On Board diagnostics system (J-OBDII), Pre-Collision warning and Tire Pressure Monitoring system is also available in the lineup.

The engines for this generation are the 8.9 litre A09C and 12.9 litre E13C with 12 speed Proshift transmission.

It won the Good Design Award in 2017.

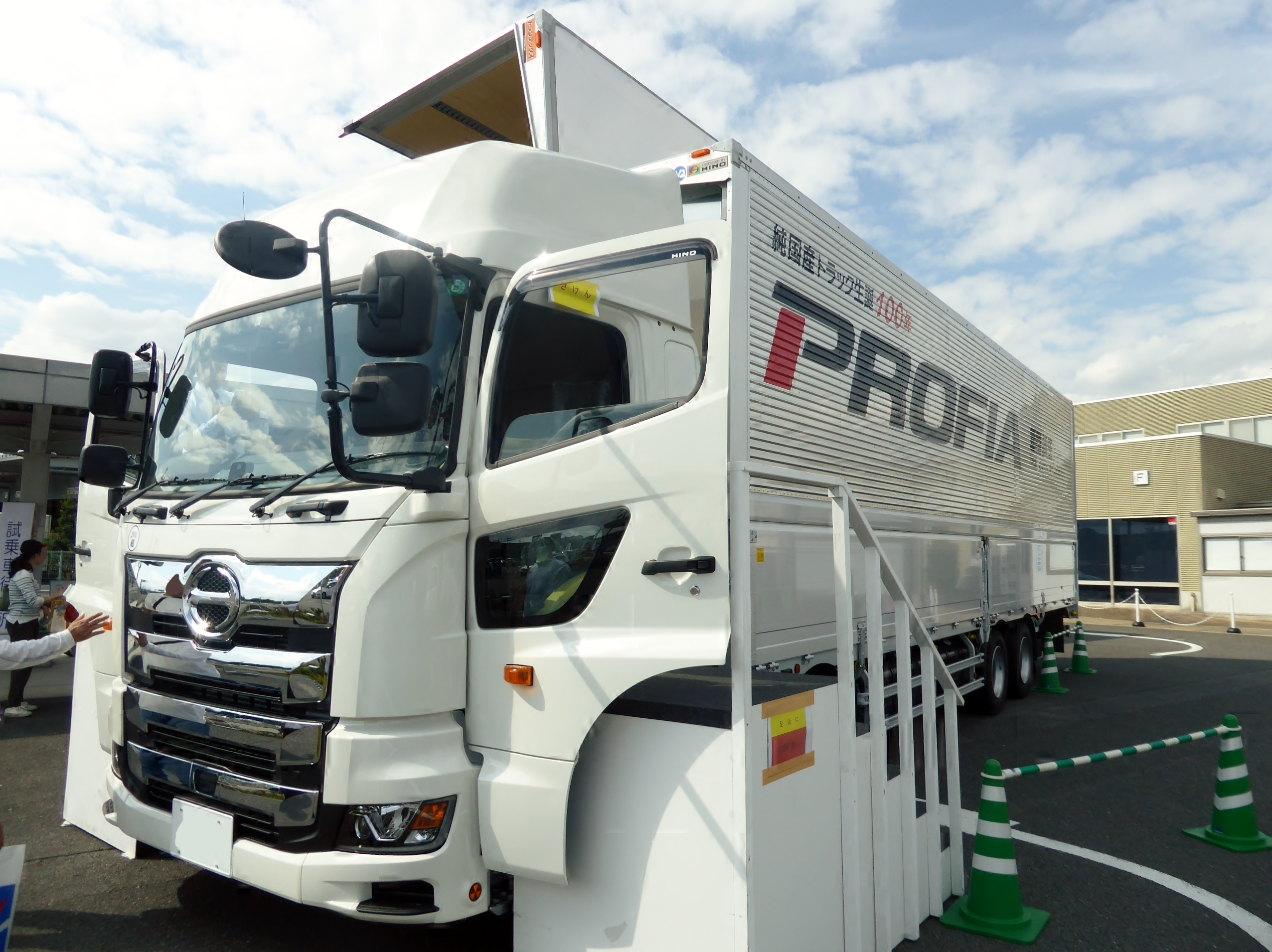
Hino Profia FR wing van (Japan)

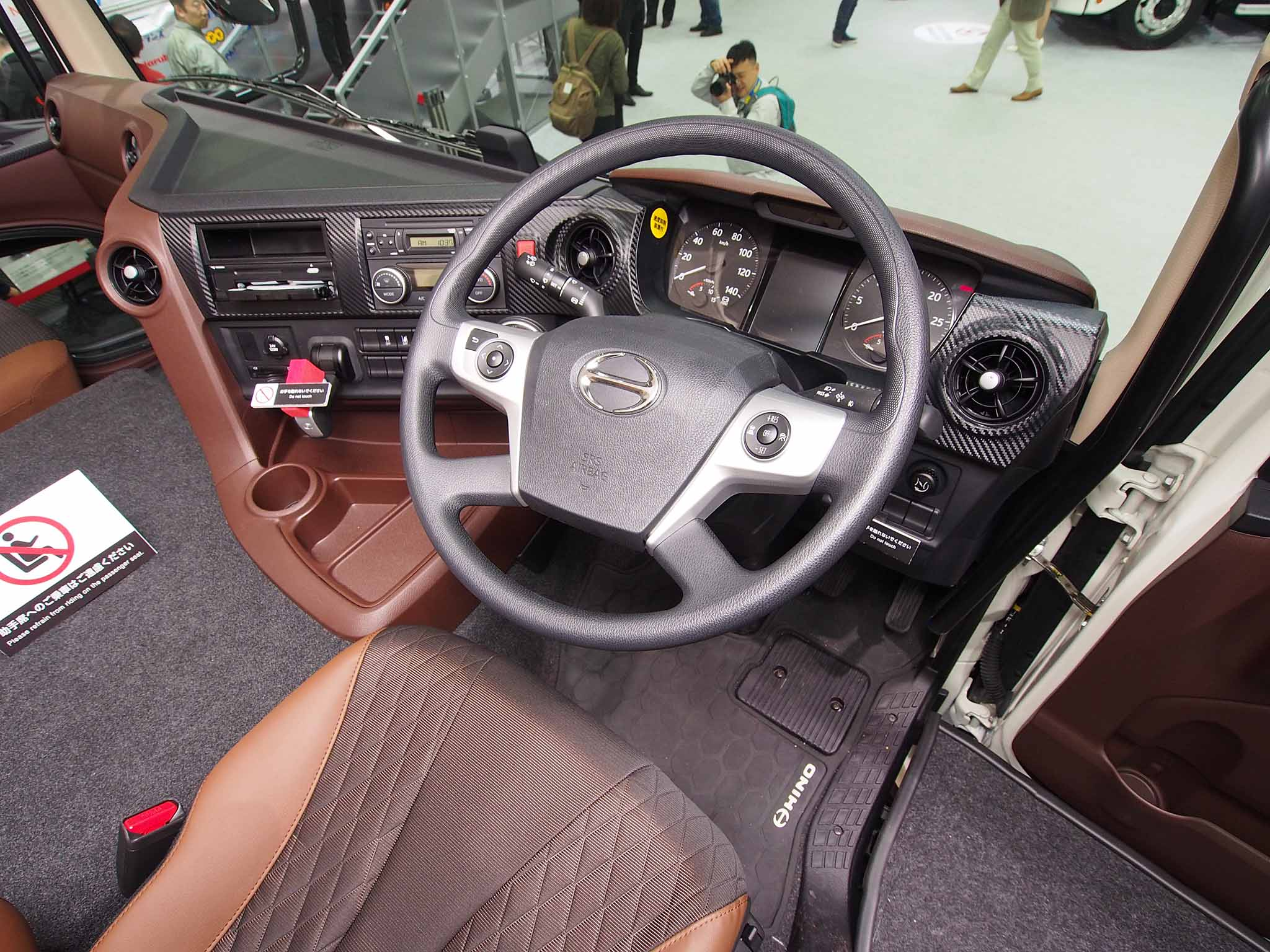
Interior

== Lineup ==
- FH 4x2
- XH 4x4
- FR 6x2
- GN 6x2/2
- FN 6x2/4
- FR-B 6x2*4
- FS 6x4
- FS-B 6x4*4
- XS 6x6
- FP 8x2
- FP-B 8x2*6
- FP-N 8x2/4
- FP-T 8x2/6
- FW 8x4
- FW-N 8x4/4
- FW-B 8x4*4
- FW-B 8x6
- XW 8x8
- FX 10x4/6
- FX-B 10x4*6
- FB 10x6
- FB-Z 10x8
- XB 10x10
- FQ 12x4/8

== Engines ==
- A09C (Inline-6) 270–380 PS (270–370 hp)
- E13C (Inline-6) 340–520 PS (340–510 hp)
- F17D (V8) 310–520 PS (310–510 hp)
- K13C (Inline-6) 290–560 PS (290–550 hp)
- K13D (Inline-6) 340–380 PS (340–370 hp)
- P11C (Inline-6) 230–360 PS (230–360 hp)
- F20C (V8) 380 PS (370 hp)
- F21C (V8) 390 PS (380 hp)
- V22D (V10) 410 PS (400 hp)
- V25C & V26C (V10) 450–480 PS (440–470 hp)
