= Nissan Diesel C-series =

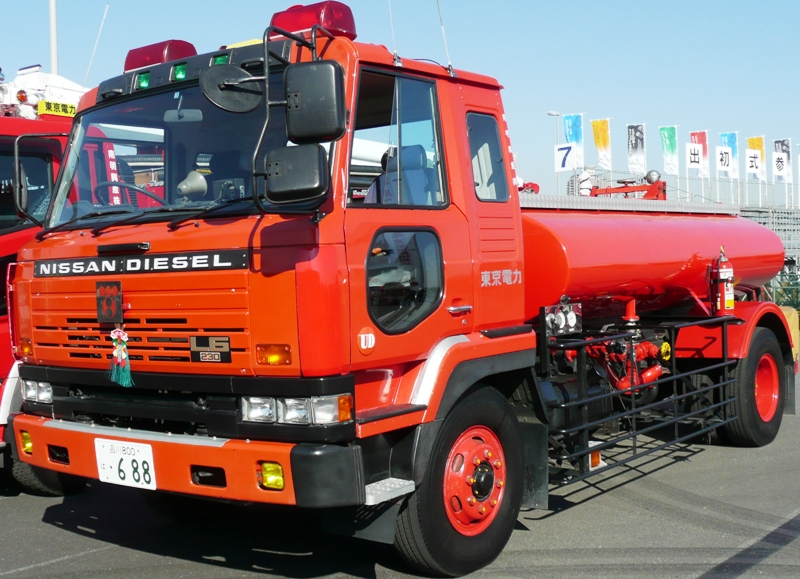

Overview
- Manufacturer: UD (Nissan Diesel)
- Also called: Nissan Diesel Resona; Nissan Shogun (New Zealand)
- Production: 1971-1990

Body and chassis
- Class: Truck

Powertrain
- Engine: PE6, PE6T, GD6T, RD8, RE8, RF8/RF8T, RE10

Chronology
- Predecessor: Nissan Diesel Sungreat
- Successor: Nissan Diesel Big Thumb

The Nissan Diesel C-series (Japanese: 日産ディーゼル・Cシリーズ) was a heavy-duty commercial vehicle that was produced by the Japanese manufacturer Nissan Diesel (now UD Trucks) and sold in two generations between 1971 and 1990 (although production continued into the 1990s for certain markets). The second generation was marketed as the "Nissan Diesel Resona" in Japan from 1983 until 1986, which is usually what the second generation is referred to as. The C-series was replaced by the Nissan Diesel Big Thumb in 1990.

== First generation (1971-1979) ==
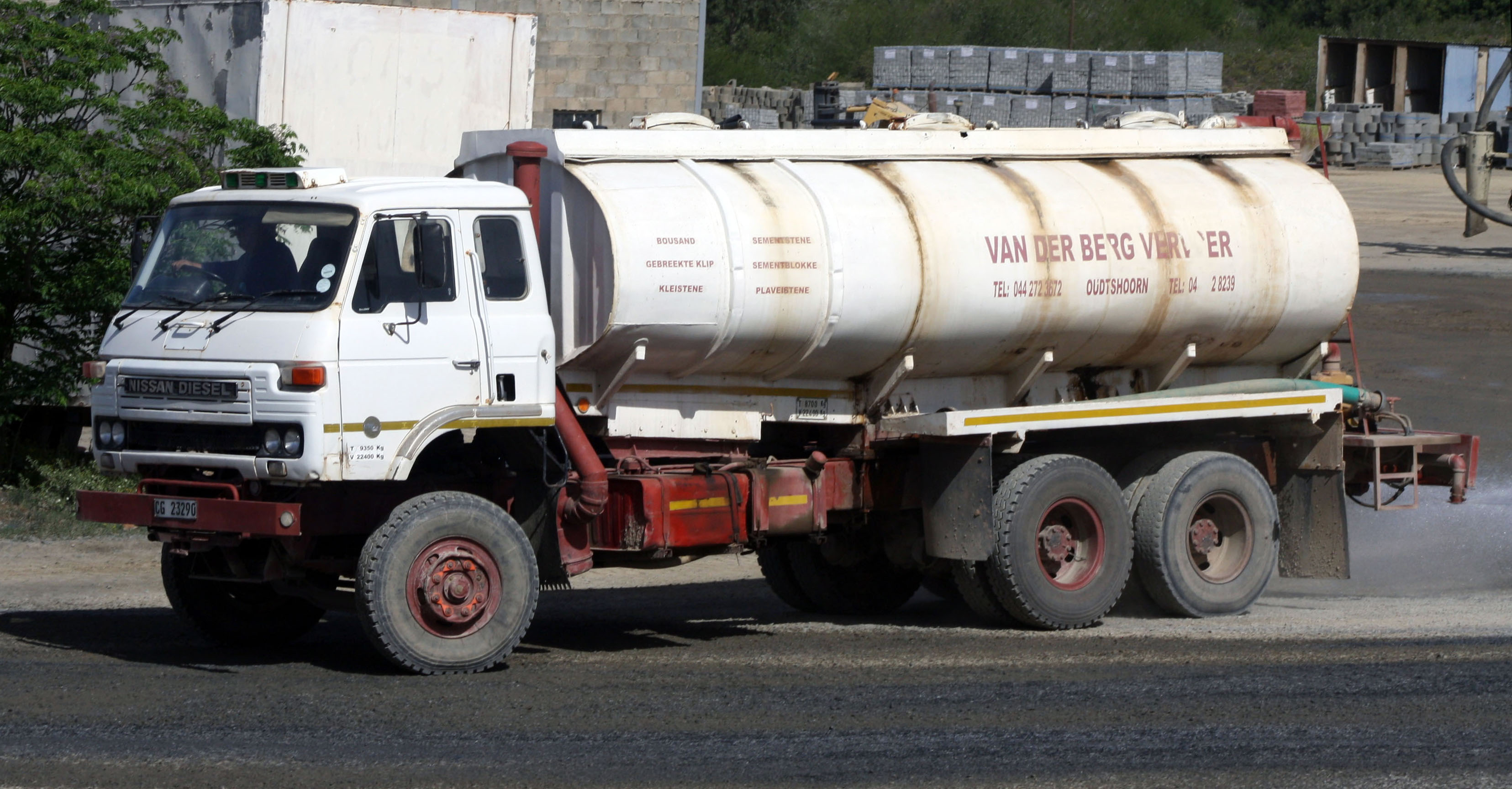
Nissan Diesel CW41 water tanker

The first generation Nissan Diesel C-series trucks were built from 1971 until 1979. Certain versions, like the heaviest tractors and special-use models continued to be built into the early 1980s as they were only gradually replaced by the second generation models.

=== Lineup ===
CV (2 front axles, 1 rear, 6 × 2)
CW (1 front axle, 2 rear, 6 × 4)
WK (6 × 4)
CD (1 front axle, 2 rear, 6 × 2)
CG (2 front axles, 2 rear, 8 x 4)
CK (4 × 2)
CK-T (4 x 2 tractor)
CW-T (1 front axle, 2 rear, 6 × 4, tractor)
CF (4 x 4 snowplow)
CZ (6 x 6 snowplow)
CB (8 x 8 snowplow)
WD (like a CW but oversized; not permitted on public roads)

== Second generation (1979-1990) ==
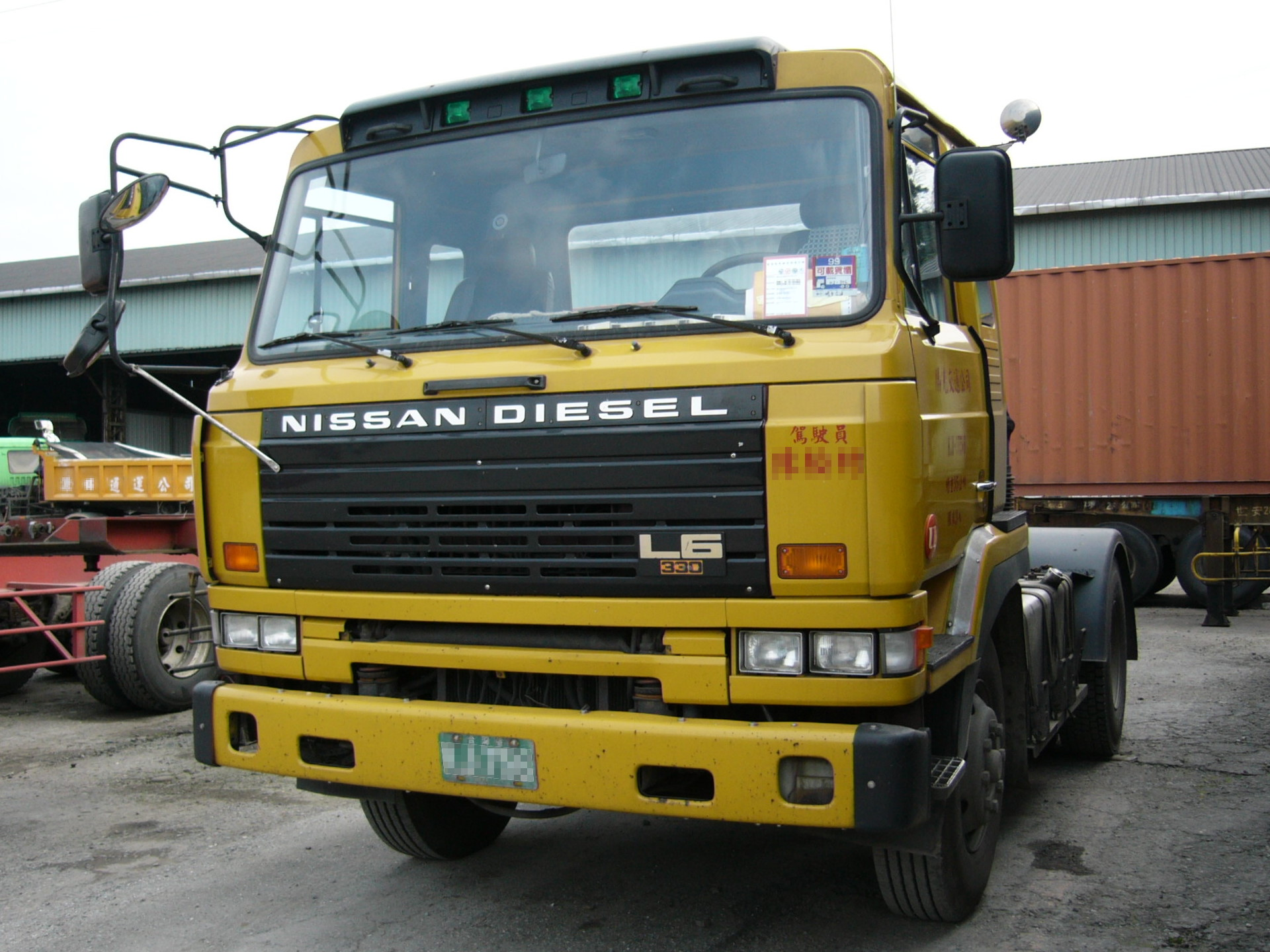
Nissan Diesel 330 (Taiwan)

Arriving in 1979, the new C-series originally had round headlamps. In 1983 the model received a facelift, changing to square headlamps. This was also when the name was changed to Resona in Japan (short for "resonate"), although Nissan Diesel reverted to using the C-series name in 1986. The second generation was available with inline-six PE6 and GD6 diesels (also available turbocharged), as well as the naturally aspirated V8 (RE8 and RF8) and V10 (RE10) diesels. In New Zealand, the 14-liter GD6T-powered machines were marketed as the "Nissan Diesel Shogun."

=== Lineup ===
CK (4 × 2)
CD (6 × 2)
CV (6 x 2; twin front axles)
CW (6 × 4)
WK (6 × 4)
LG (Low floor 8 × 4)
LW (Low floor 6 × 4)
CK-T (4 x 2 tractors)
CW-T (6 x 4 tractors)
CF (4 x 4 snowplow)
CZ (6 x 6 snowplow)
CB (8 x 8 snowplow)
WD (oversized 6 x 4; not permitted on public roads in Japan)

The New Zealand importer also developed their own twin-steer 8 x 4 version (CGA340) with the second axle set farther forward than on Japanese-market trucks. This was also available as a conversion kit for the earlier CWA models.
