= Samsung Commercial Vehicles =

South Korean vehicle manufacturer

Samsung Commercial Vehicles Co., Ltd.
- Native name: 삼성상용차 주식회사
- Type: Subsidiary
- Industry: Heavy equipment
- Predecessor: Samsung Heavy Industries vehicle production division
- Founded: 22 August 1996
- Founder: Lee Kun-hee
- Defunct: 28 December 2001
- Headquarters: Daegu, South Korea
- Number of employees: 1,400 (1996)
- Parent: Samsung

- Samsung Commercial Vehicles
- Hangul: 삼성상용차
- Hanja: 三星商用車
- RR: Samseong sangyongcha
- MR: Samsŏng sangyongch'a

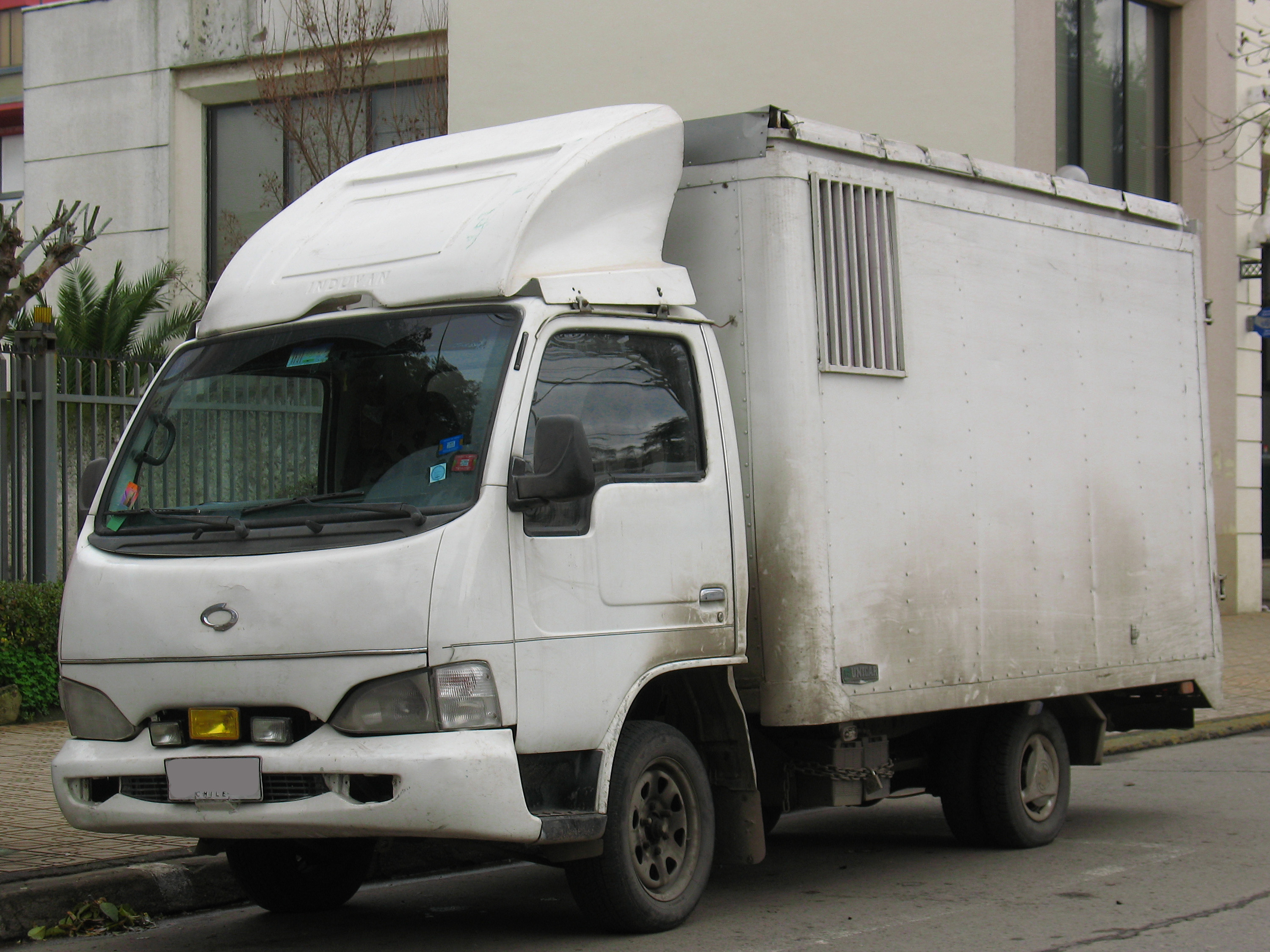
The Samsung SV110, a slightly modified Nissan Atlas F23

Samsung Commercial Vehicles (Korean: 삼성상용차, IPA: [samsʌŋ saŋjoŋtɕʰa]) was a South Korean trucks, bus and construction equipment manufacturer established by the Samsung Group in 1996 and closed in 2000 as a result of the 1997 Asian financial crisis. The company was formed through a corporate spin-off from Samsung Heavy Industries.

== History ==
In 1992, Samsung started to seek approval to create a commercial vehicles' assembly plant through Samsung Heavy Industries, with Nissan Diesel's technological assistance. By 1994 the local government reluctantly granted all permissions, although Samsung Heavy Industries was assembling heavy trucks from May 1993, and also produced electric car prototypes between 1993 and 1994 (SEV-I, SEV-II and SEV-III). In 1996, Samsung Commercial Vehicles was spun off from Samsung Heavy Industries and on the same year was started the construction of a commercial vehicle plant in Daegu. Truck production was moved from Changwon to the new facility by late 1997. The company also opened a technical service centre at Pyeongtaek. The construction equipment business of Samsung Heavy Industries (mainly producing excavators) was sold to Volvo for US$512 million in July 1998, following the onset of the Asian financial crisis. The manufacturing operation was renamed as Volvo Construction Equipment Korea and Samsung maintained a minority 13% stake and received a payment from Volvo in exchange of keeping the "Samsung" trademark for a further three years. The forklift production business was sold to Clark Material Handling Company, which had licensed the designs of those kind of vehicles to Samsung since 1986, after an OEM alliance established in 1984.

The Asian financial crisis hit when Samsung Commercial Vehicles marketed the first products under its name. Samsung sold its carmaker (Samsung Motors) to the French Renault, but, after negotiations with Renault's Renault VI subsidiary, Scania and Volvo, it decided to keep the company. One of the truck models produced, the Samsung SV110 with a 2.7-litre diesel engine and a 3.5-tonne GVW version, was sold at overseas markets, including Italy, Turkey and Poland. Versions of the SV110 were also sold in Japan, and they were exported up to 26 countries. In April 2000, the company and SsangYong Motor signed an agreement to jointly sell the truck. Another model, the heavier SM510, was sold in the United Kingdom by 1999.

Between 1997 and 1999, the company's share in a declining South Korean commercial vehicle market was below 4%, which made it harder to achieve economies of scale. It had a net money loss during those years, and continued in operation through the support of Samsung's financial affiliates. In October 2000, truck production at the company's single assembling facility in Daegu was stopped because of an alleged problem to get new engines from Nissan, although plans for restarting production by May 2001 were announced. In early November 2000, Samsung announced it was selling Samsung Commercial Vehicles' assets to cover its debts and relocating its employees, following pressure from creditor banks. At the end of the year, Samsung Commercial Vehicles declared bankruptcy. All its assets were sold and its personnel was transferred to other subsidiaries of the Samsung Group.

The closing of Samsung Commercial Vehicles, along with Daewoo Motors bankruptcy, severely affected the already weakened Daegu economy, increasing the opposition against the national government and the big companies. Samsung Commercial Vehicles' failure generated suspicion and accusations of fraud and destruction of evidence for certain managers.

The company's liquidation ended in 2002.

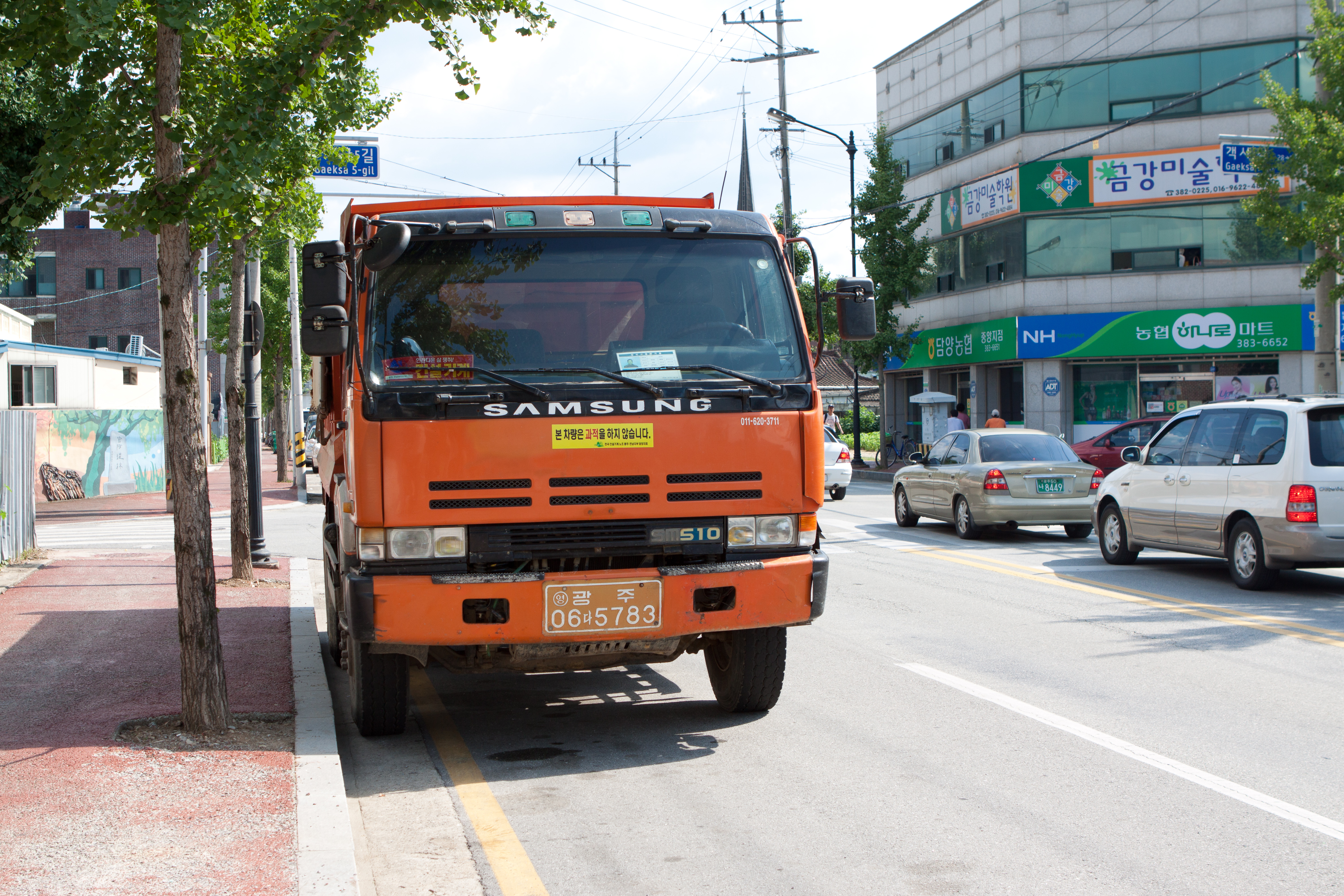
Samsung SM510

== Branding ==
At first, Samsung Commercial Vehicles models had the word Samsung and the model designation on the front. In 1998, they adopted the corporate identity of sister company Samsung Motors, using the same marque badge on a redesigned grille.

== Models ==
- SV110(Yamouzine) (revised Nissan Atlas F23)
- SM510 (revised Nissan Diesel Big Thumb, rebadged as SV710 in 1998)
- SM530 (revised Nissan Diesel Big Thumb, rebadged as SV730 in 1998)

== See also ==
- Renault Korea
- Samsung Heavy Industries
- Automotive industry in South Korea
