= UD Quon =

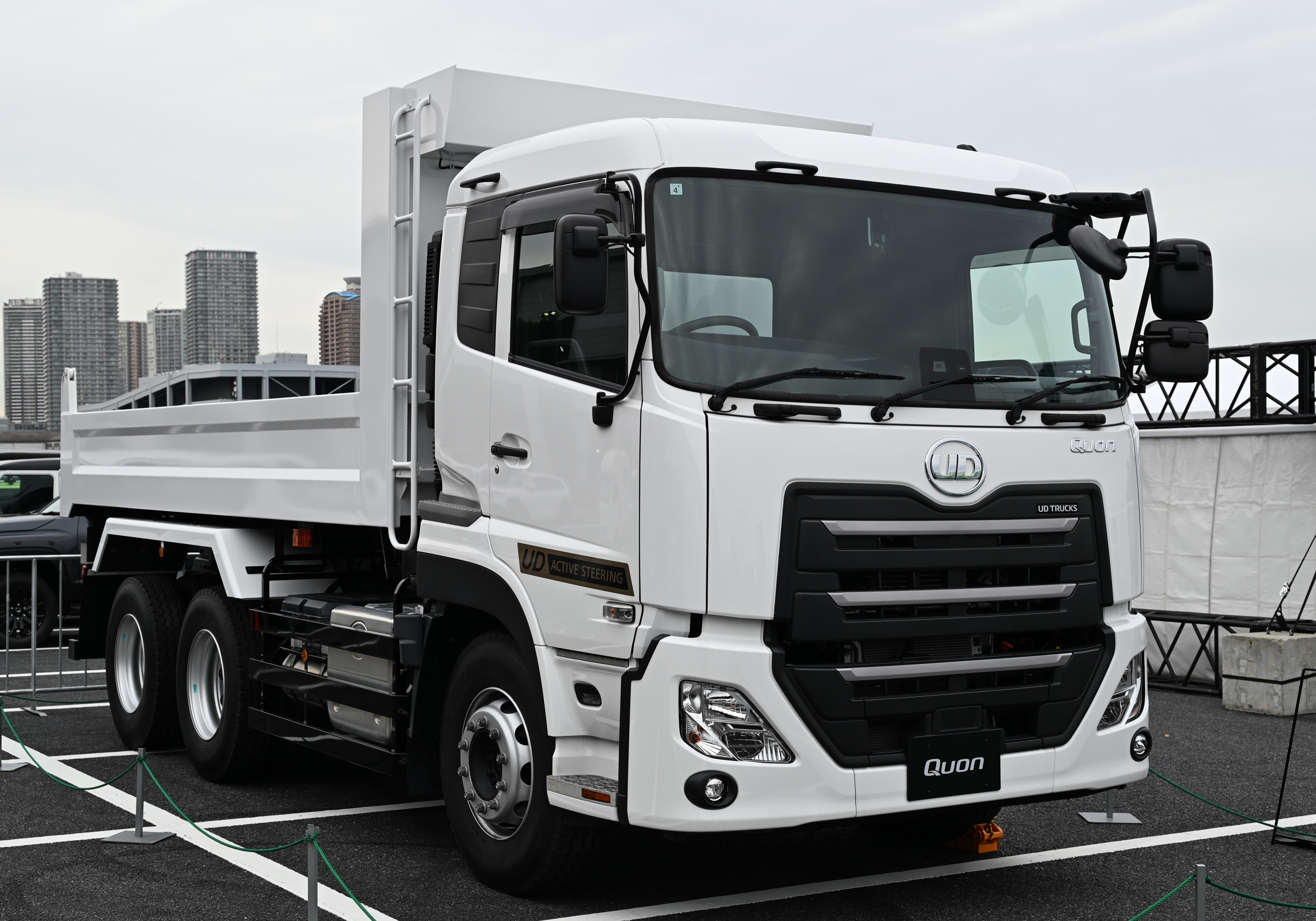
- UD Quon CW 8L 6x4

Overview
- Manufacturer: UD Trucks
- Also called: Nissan Diesel Quon (2007–2010); Isuzu Giga (2023–present)
- Production: 2004–present

Body and chassis
- Class: Truck
- Body style: Truck (standard cab)
- Related: UD Quester

Powertrain
- Engine: Diesel; 7.7L GH8 DOHC turbodiesel I6; 9.2L MD92-TB/TC DOHC turbodiesel I6; 11L GH11-TA/TB/TC DOHC turbodiesel I6; 13.0L GE13-TB/TC/TD/TF DOHC turbodiesel I6; 12.7L GH13 DOHC turbodiesel I6
- Transmission: 7-speed manual ESCOT-Plus1 12-speed automated manual ESCOT-AT IV 12-speed automatic

Chronology
- Predecessor: Nissan Diesel Big Thumb

The UD Quon (kana: UD・クオン) is a heavy-duty commercial vehicle produced by the Japanese manufacturer UD Trucks. Quon was originally developed by Nissan Diesel Corporation with the world first implementation of Selective catalytic reduction (SCR) system to an automobile.

== History ==
First Generation (2004–2017)

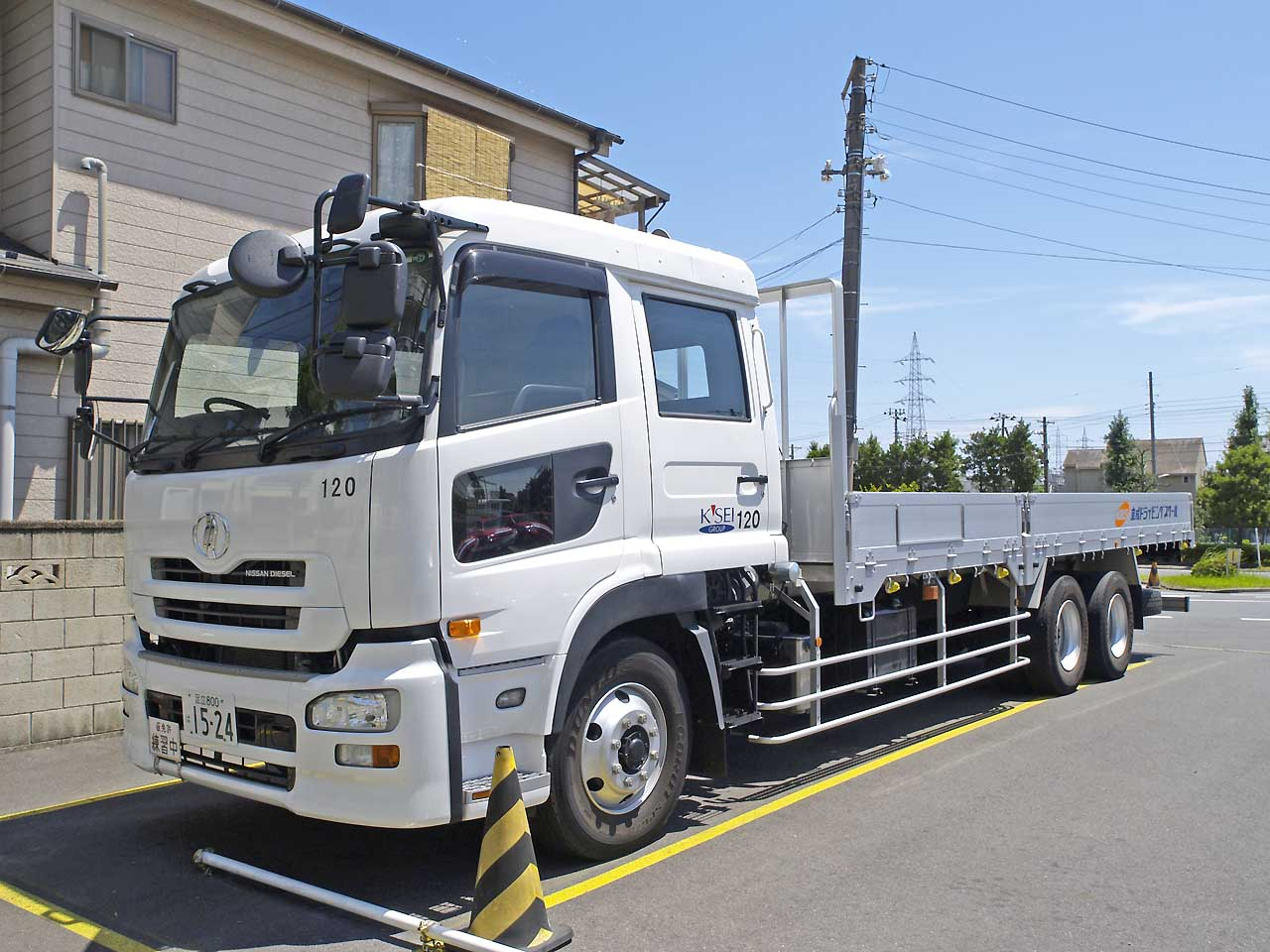
Nissan Diesel Quon

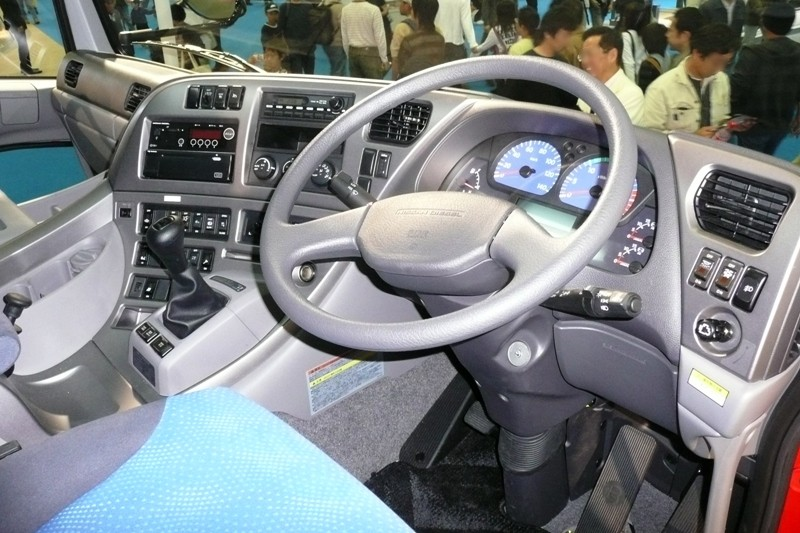
Quon cockpit

Quon was released on November 18, 2004 in Japan, as the successor of BigThumb. It is said that it was named for the term "Kuon (久遠)" with the same pronunciation, meaning "timeline forever" or "permanent". Not only equipped with SCR system, Quon was the world's first truck which has SRS knee airbag as standard equipment.

Second generation (2017–present)

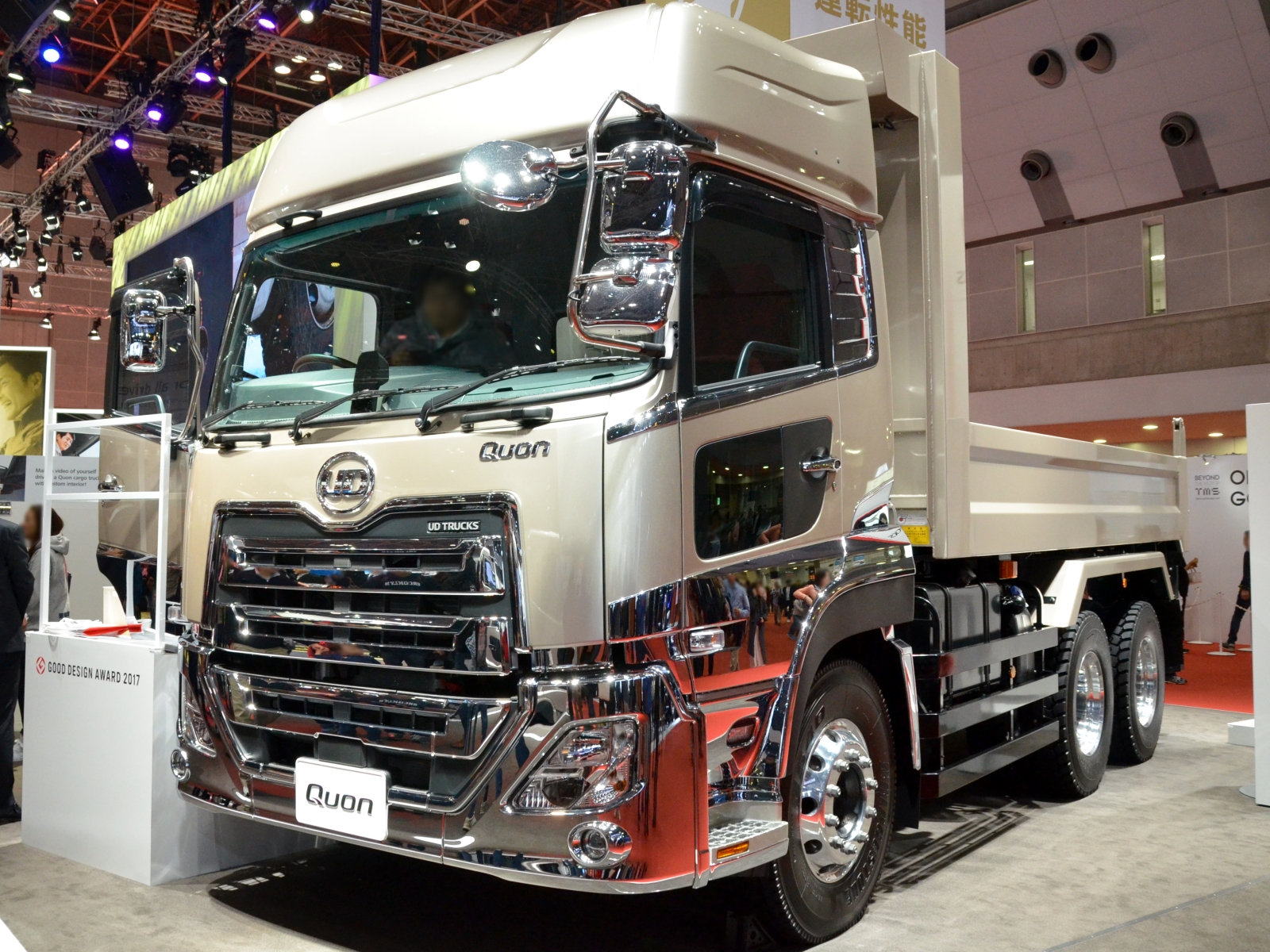
2017 UD Quon CW dump truck

The second generation Quon was released in 2017. It has improved drivability with a new 11-litre GH11 (based on Volvo D11) and 8-litre GH8 (based on Volvo D8) diesel engine.

Third generation (2025–present)
The third generation Quon was released in 2025. The 7-speed manual model is sold using OEM from Isuzu, while the manual 12-speed model remains on sale.

== Awards ==
- 2005: Jidōsha-gijyutukai Gijyutsu-kaihatsu-syō (自動車技術会 技術開発賞) (Techinology Development Award) from JSAE

== Line up ==
- CK 4x2
- CD 6x2R
- CV 6x2F
- CW 6x4
- CX 6x4 (low floor variant)
- CG 8x4
- CF 4x4
- CZ 6x6
- GK 4x2
- GW 6x4
- CV-P 6x2
- CW-P 6x4

== Engine ==
Quon engines using AdBlue Urea Selective Catalytic Reduction technology.

- MD92-TB Straight-6 OHC 9.203 cc 340HP
- MD92-TC Straight-6 OHC 370HP
- GH8 Straight-6 OHC 7.700cc 280HP
- GH11-TA Straight-6 OHC 10.836 cc 350HP
- GH11-TB Straight-6 OHC 380HP
- GH11-TC Straight-6 OHC 410HP
- GE13-TB Straight-6 OHC 13.074 cc 380HP
- GE13-TC Straight-6 OHC 410HP
- GE13-TD Straight-6 OHC 440HP
- GE13-TF Straight-6 OHC 520HP
- GH13-TD Straight-6 OHC 450HP
- GH13-TE Straight-6 OHC 480HP

== See also ==
- UD
- Selective catalytic reduction (SCR)
