= Isuzu Giga =

Heavy-duty commercial vehicles produced by Isuzu

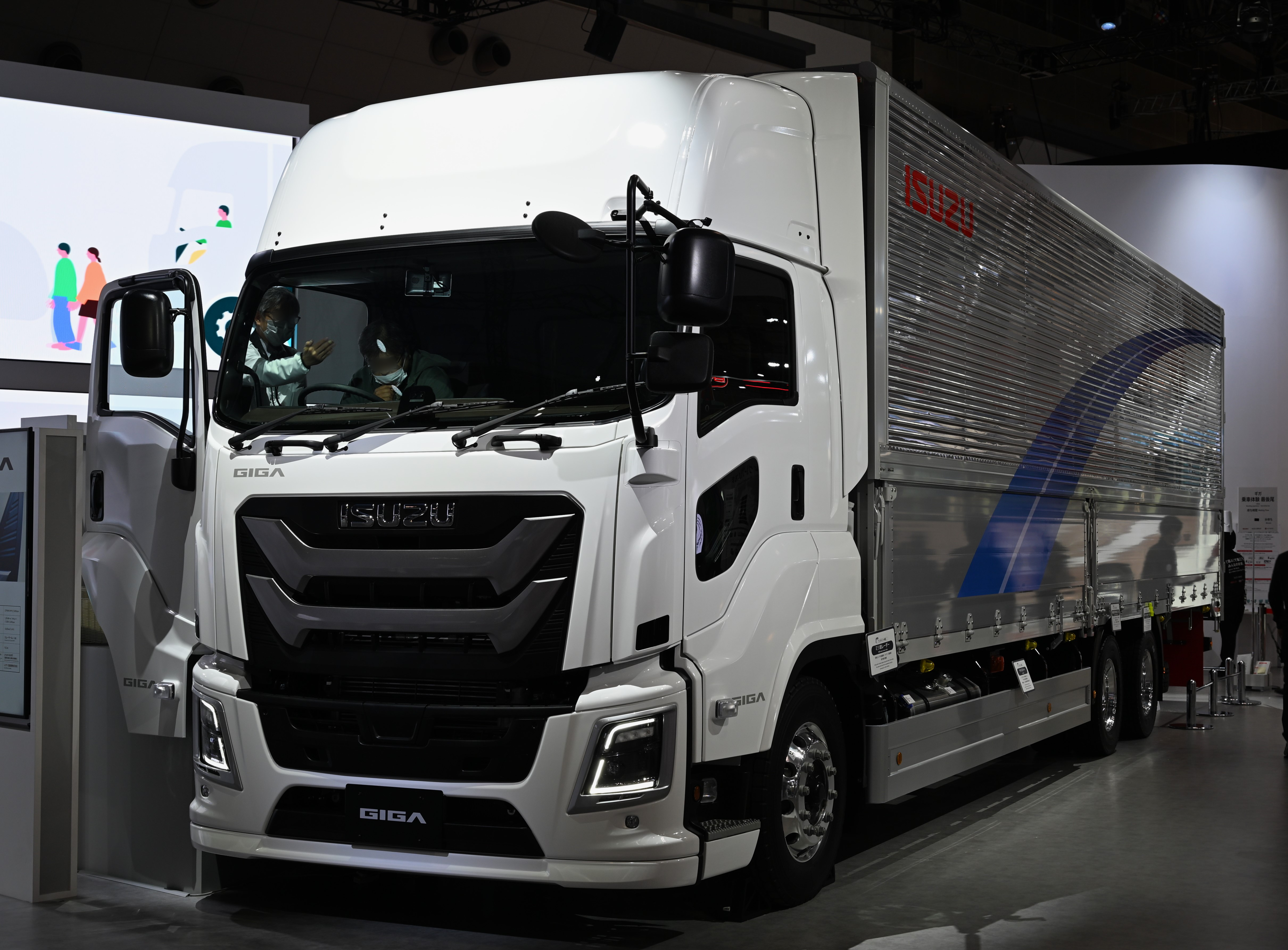

Overview
- Manufacturer: Isuzu
- Also called: Isuzu Heavy Duty; Isuzu C/E series; Isuzu S&E series; Chevrolet C/E series; UD Quon (2023–present)
- Production: 1994–present
- Assembly: Japan: Fujisawa, Kanagawa; Russia: Alabuğa (Sollers-Isuzu); Chile: Huechuraba, (GM Chile); China: Chongqing (Qingling); Philippines: Biñan, Laguna, (IPC); Vietnam: Ho Chi Minh City (IVC); Malaysia: Petaling Jaya (Isuzu Malaysia); Nigeria: Lagos (Yachiyo Isuzu Nigeria)

Body and chassis
- Class: Truck
- Body style: 2-door standard cab (Worldwide); 4-door crew cab (Australia only)

Powertrain
- Transmission: 5-speed manual, 6-speed manual, 7-speed manual (Japanese Domestic Market Only), 16-speed manual (for tractor only), 6-speed automatic, 10-speed automatic, 12-speed automatic & 16-speed automatic (Smoother-G & some export models outside Japan)

Chronology
- Predecessor: Isuzu 810

The Isuzu Giga (Japanese: いすゞ・ギガ) is a line of heavy-duty commercial vehicles produced by Isuzu since 1994. Outside of Japan, the line is known as the Isuzu C/E series and Isuzu S&E series and was formerly known as the Isuzu Heavy-Duty Truck'. Between 1994 and 2016, it was also sold in South America (under the Chevrolet brand as Chevrolet C/E series).

== First generation (1994) ==
First Generation
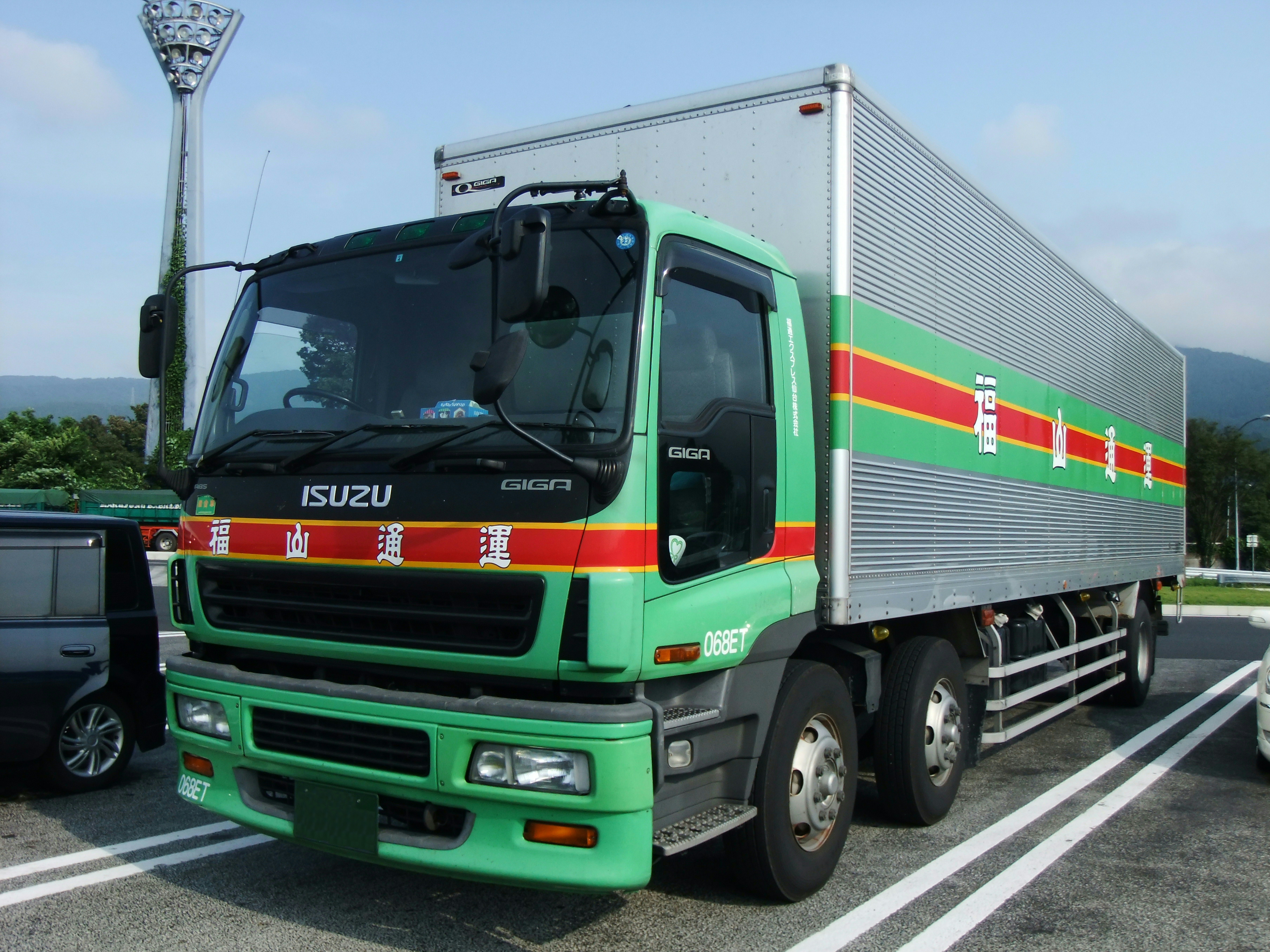

Overview
- Manufacturer: Isuzu Motors Ltd.
- Also called: C/E series (Intl. exports); Chevrolet C / E series (Latin America)
- Production: 1994–2015 (Japanese market), Until 2022 (Export market)

Body and chassis
- Body style: Truck (standard cab (Worldwide), crew cab (Australia only))

Powertrain
- Engine: 6NX1 & 6HK1 (Indonesian market only based on Isuzu F-series), 6SD1, 6WA1, 6WF1, 6WG1, 6UZ1, 8PE1, 8TD1, 10PE1, 10TD1, 12PE1
- Transmission: 7-speed manual 12-speed Smoother-G AMT; 16-speed manual 16-speed Smoother-G

The Isuzu Giga heavy-duty truck was first introduced in 1994 as the successor to the Isuzu 810. The early models featured multiple body types (box truck, tractor trailer, dump truck), new high GVW options (22t and 25t), and advanced design elements such as bumper-mounted headlights, which later became common in the industry. Several trim levels were offered, ranging from basic to luxury. Over the years, the Giga went through multiple updates that brought design refreshes, safety improvements, and regulatory compliance. In 1997, it became the first large truck line to include SRS airbags and HID headlights as standard safety features. Engine options evolved from V-type engines to more efficient straight-six and turbocharged engines, especially to meet stricter emission and noise regulations in the 2000s. Between 2000 and 2007, further updates focused on emissions compliance, safety standards, exterior redesigns (such as grille and bumper changes), and improved technology. Advanced features like radar-based distance warning and cruise control were introduced by 2007. By this time, older configurations (such as low cab and off-road cabs) were phased out.

Between 2007 and 2010, the Isuzu Giga received updates focused on safety, efficiency, and regulatory compliance. In 2007, electronic stability control (IESC) was added to tractor models, older engine types were discontinued, and a collision damage mitigation braking system was developed. By 2009, exterior components like mirrors and turn signals were redesigned to meet international regulations, and a side-monitoring feature was added to the driver assistance system.

In 2010, a major update introduced new emissions technology (SCR + DPD), standardized the engine lineup to the 6UZ1, improved cooling and lighting through cab redesign, added a new 16-speed transmission for dump trucks, and updated wheel standards.

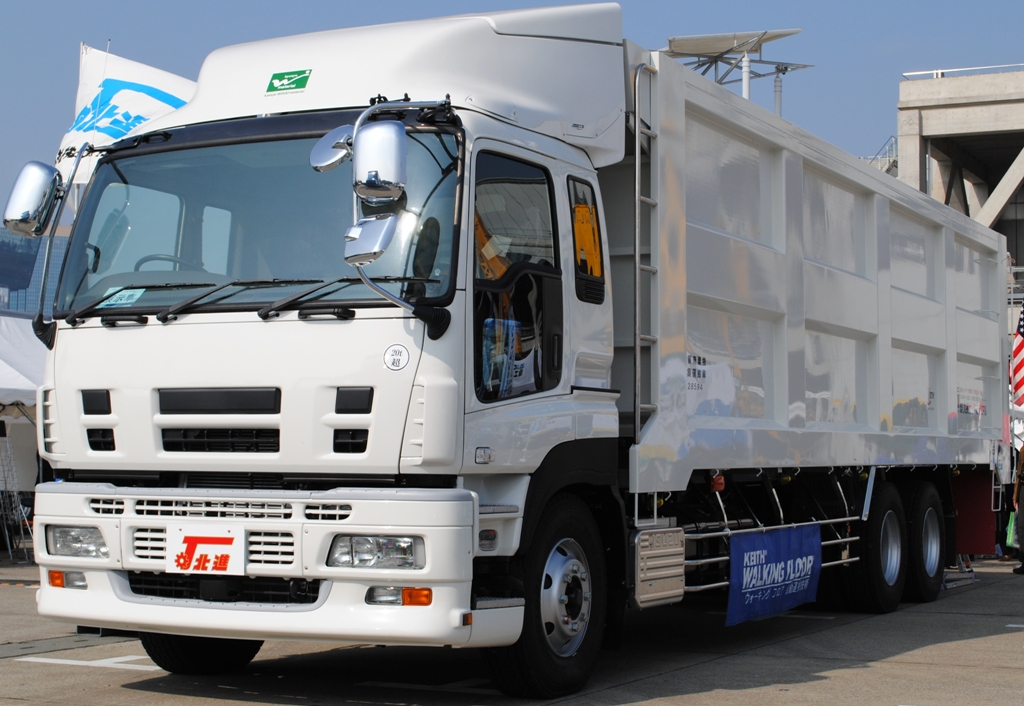
Isuzu Giga facelift (Phase II)

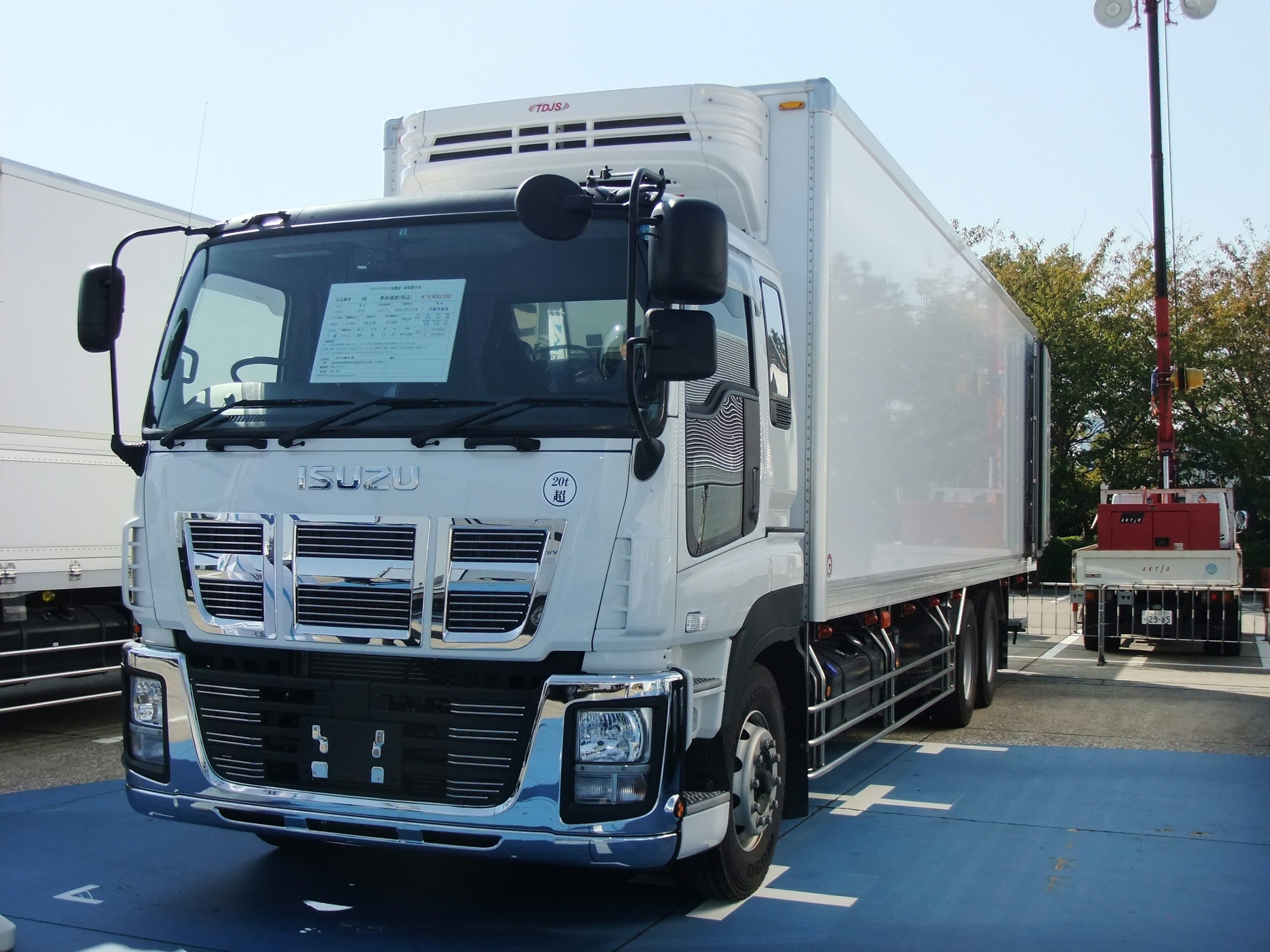
Giga 2010 model (final facelift of the first generation)

== Second generation (2015) ==
Second Generation
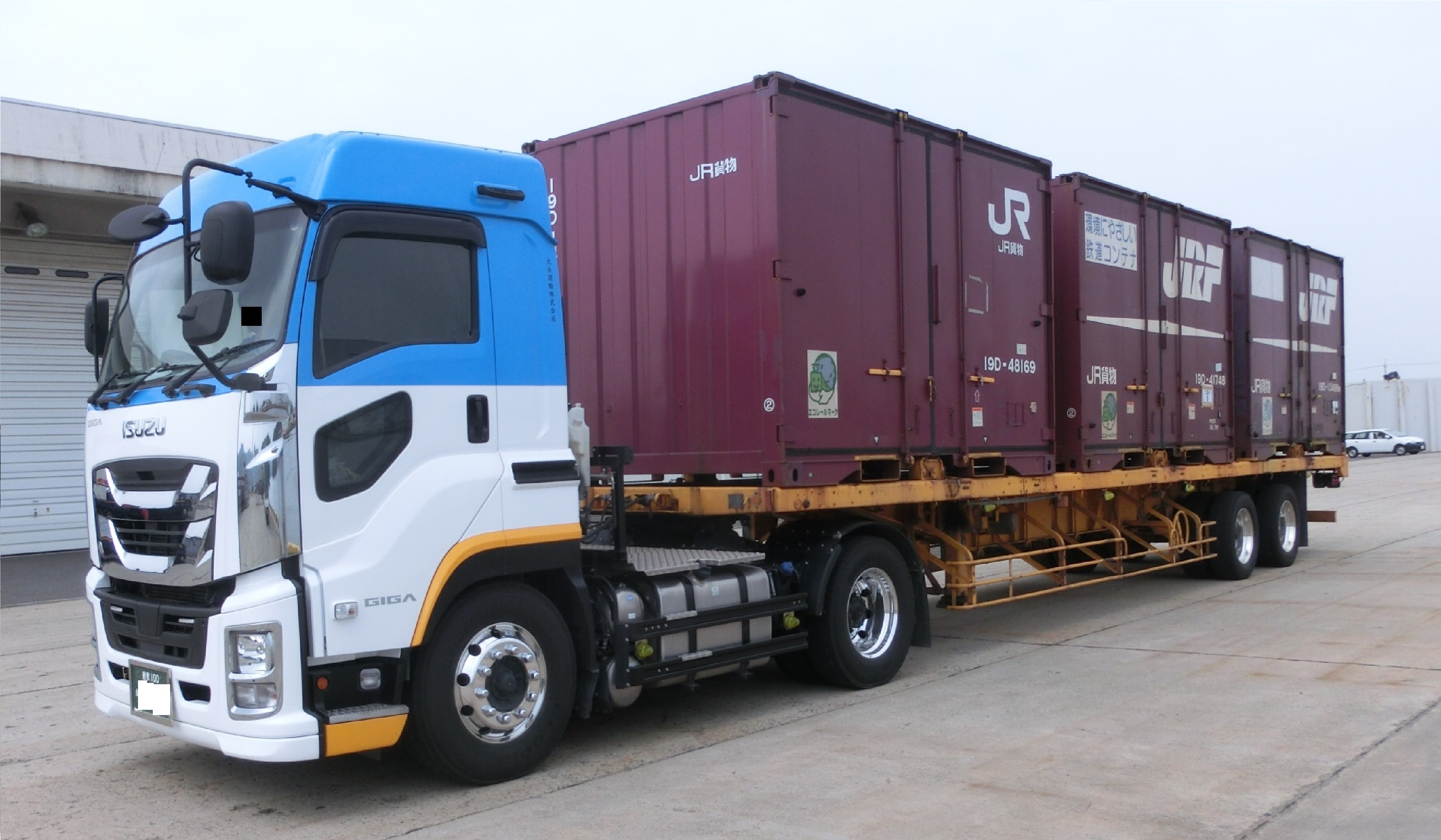

Overview
- Manufacturer: Isuzu Motors Ltd.
- Also called: C-series; E-series; S-series
- Production: 2015–2022 (Tractor for Japanese market only); 2015–present (Export market & other cargo types for Japanese market except tractor)

Body and chassis
- Body style: Truck (standard cab (Worldwide), crew cab (Australia only))
- Related: Qingling Motors Isuzu VC61

Powertrain
- Engine: 6NX1, 6UV1, 6UZ1, 6WG1
- Transmission: 7-speed manual 12-speed Smoother-G AMT; 16-speed manual 16-speed Smoother-G

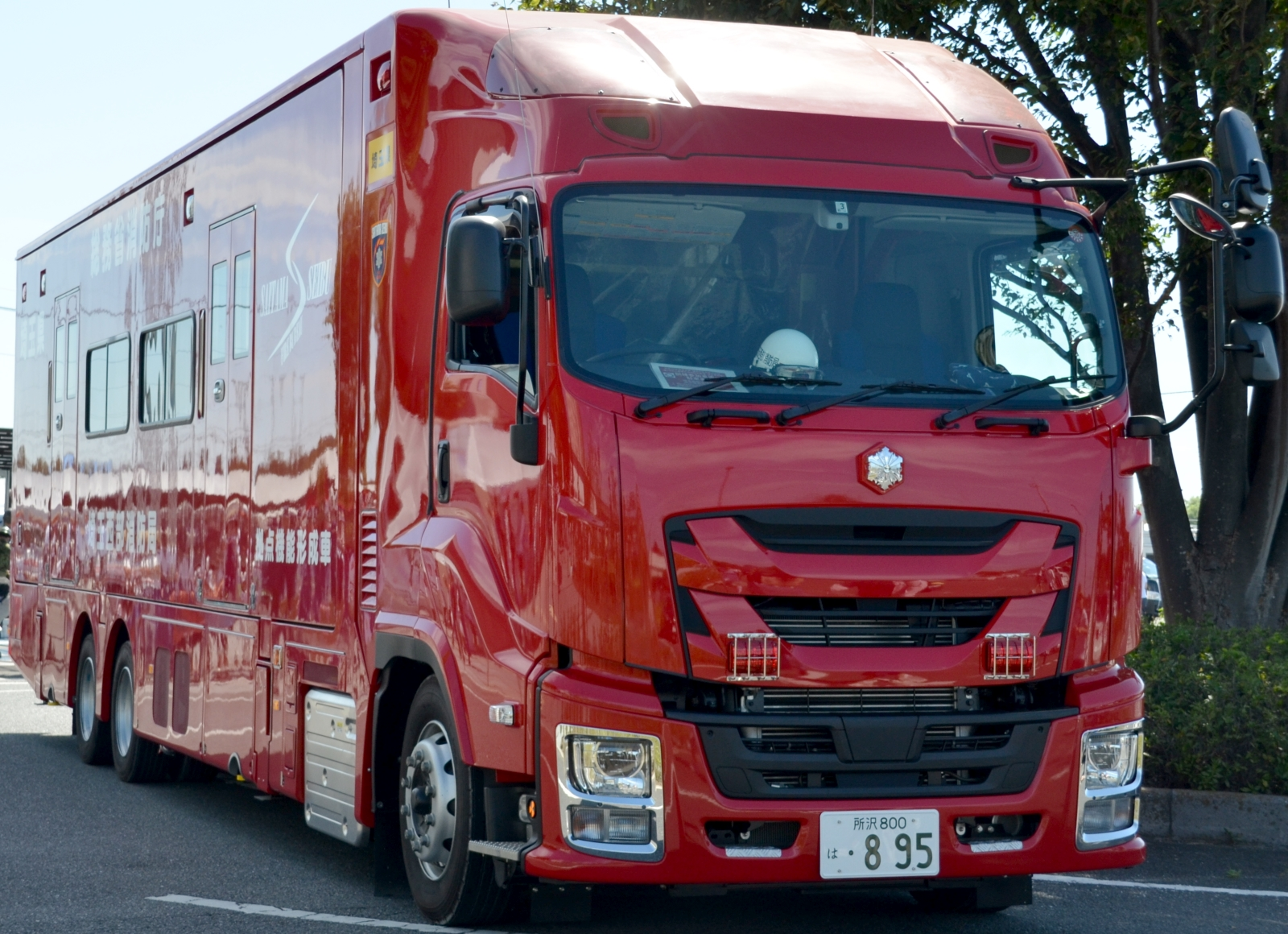
Second generation Isuzu Giga fire truck

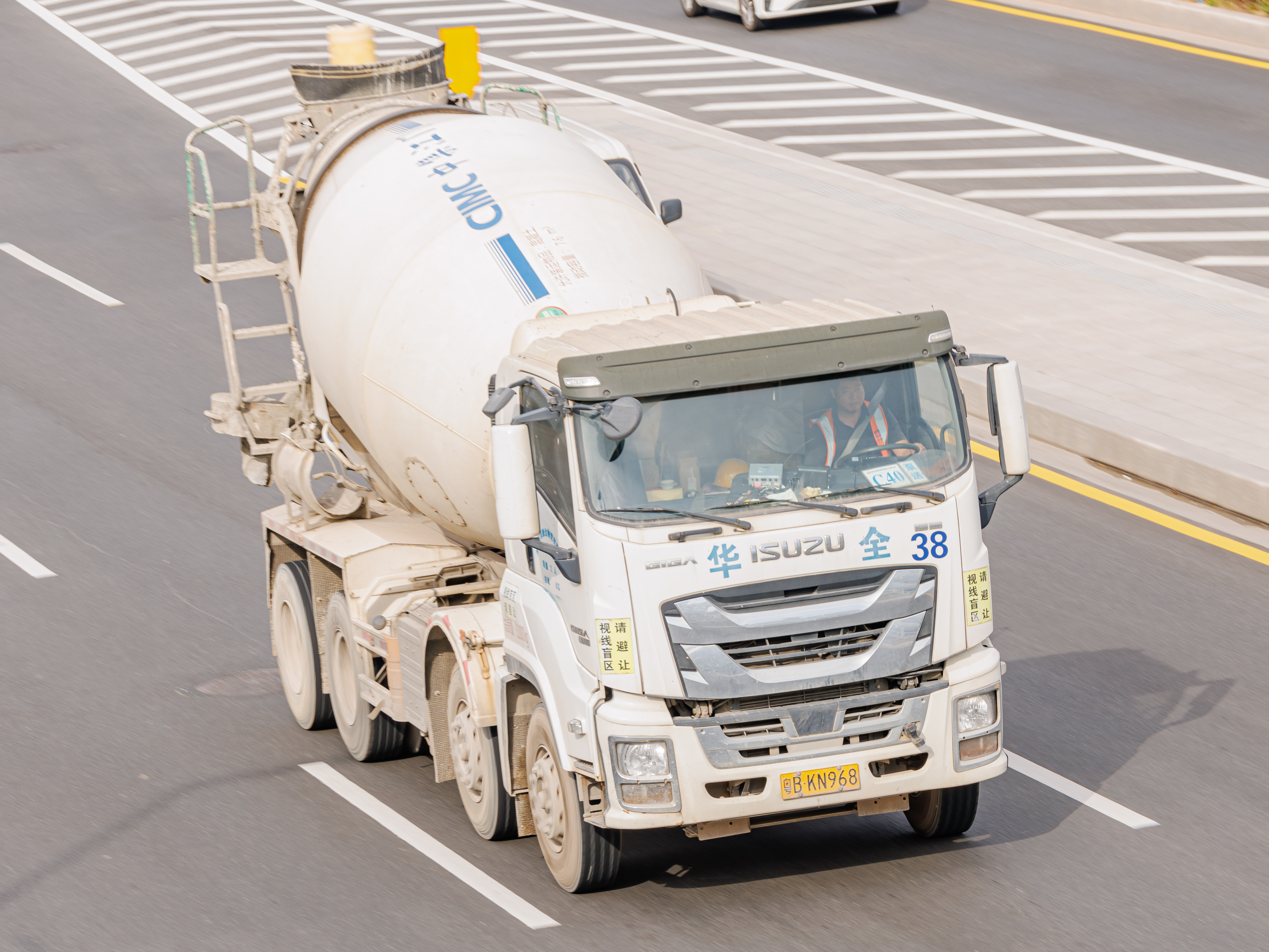
Qingling Isuzu Giga (China)

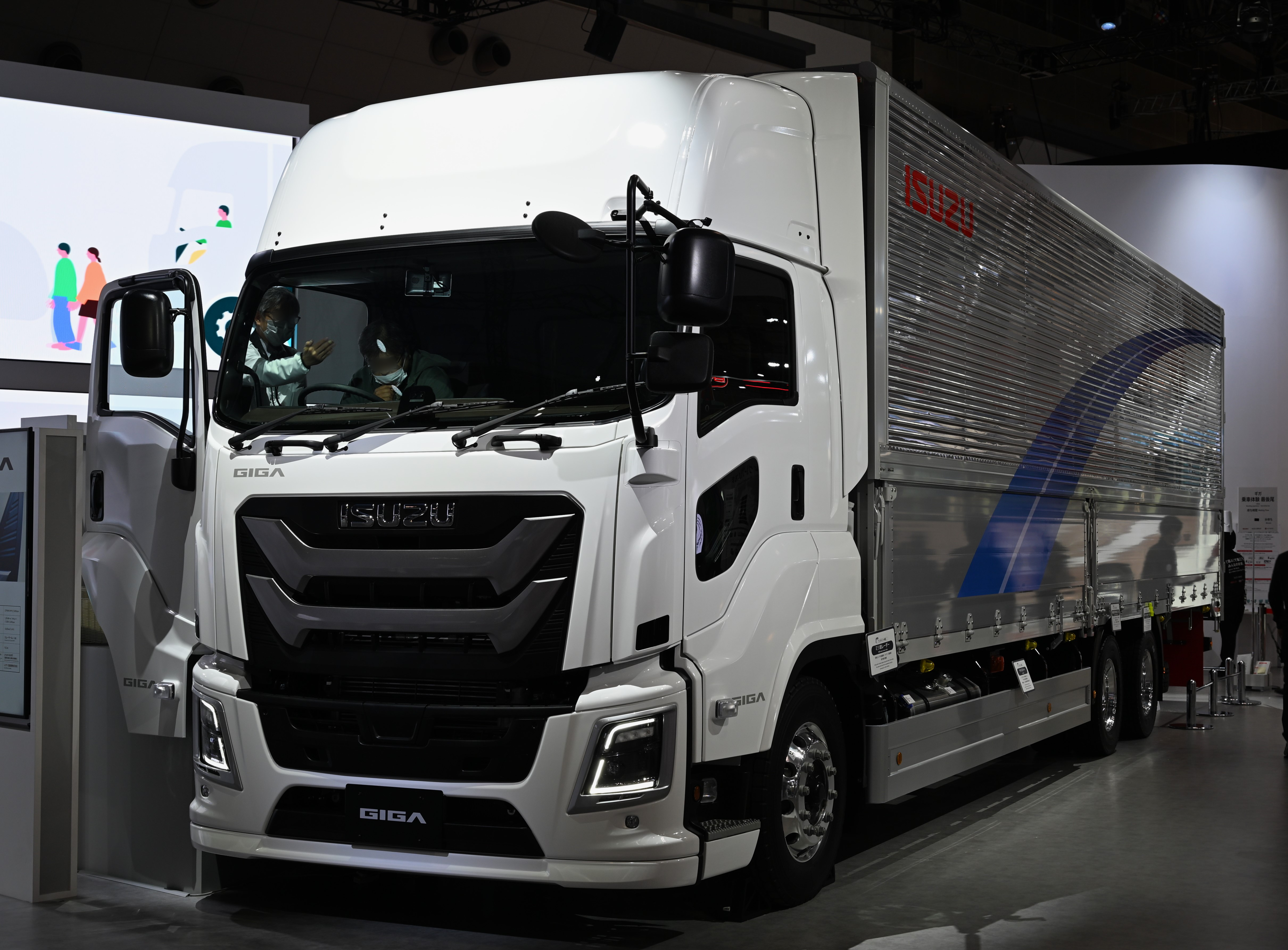
2025 Giga

The second-generation Isuzu Giga was unveiled at the 2015 Tokyo Motor Show and launched with a full model change. The new model introduced a redesigned cab shared with Forward and Elf trucks, improved aerodynamics, updated interior with digital displays and steering controls, multiple cab configurations, and enhanced comfort. The 6UZ1 engine continued with efficiency upgrades, alongside improved transmissions and fuel-saving technologies such as Smart Glide. Advanced safety systems were added, including improved pre-crash braking, lane departure warning, and driver support technologies. Fleet management systems (MIMAMORI and PREISM) were also enhanced.

From 2015 to 2018, updates included the introduction of CNG, improved tractor models, new engines (including the 6NX1), better fuel efficiency, compliance with newer emissions regulations, and LED lighting upgrades. Special editions were released, such as the 80th Anniversary model. Between 2019 and 2021, safety became a major focus, with pedestrian and cyclist detection systems, blind spot monitoring, driver monitoring, adaptive cruise control, lane keep assist, and the Emergency Driving Stop System (EDSS) were added. Comfort improvements included higher roofs and premium seating. Monitoring features expanded to include tire pressure, battery status, and safety reporting.

In 2025, the Giga became the first heavy-duty truck in Japan to include a wheel detachment warning system as standard on all models, alongside further strengthened safety technologies.

With the full model change, the symbol at the end of the model has been changed from the original Giga QKG-CYL77 A to QPG-CYL77 B, for example, in 6x2.

As of 2022 the second generation Giga has launched in Japan, China and Malaysia.

== Third generation (2023 for semi-truck only) ==
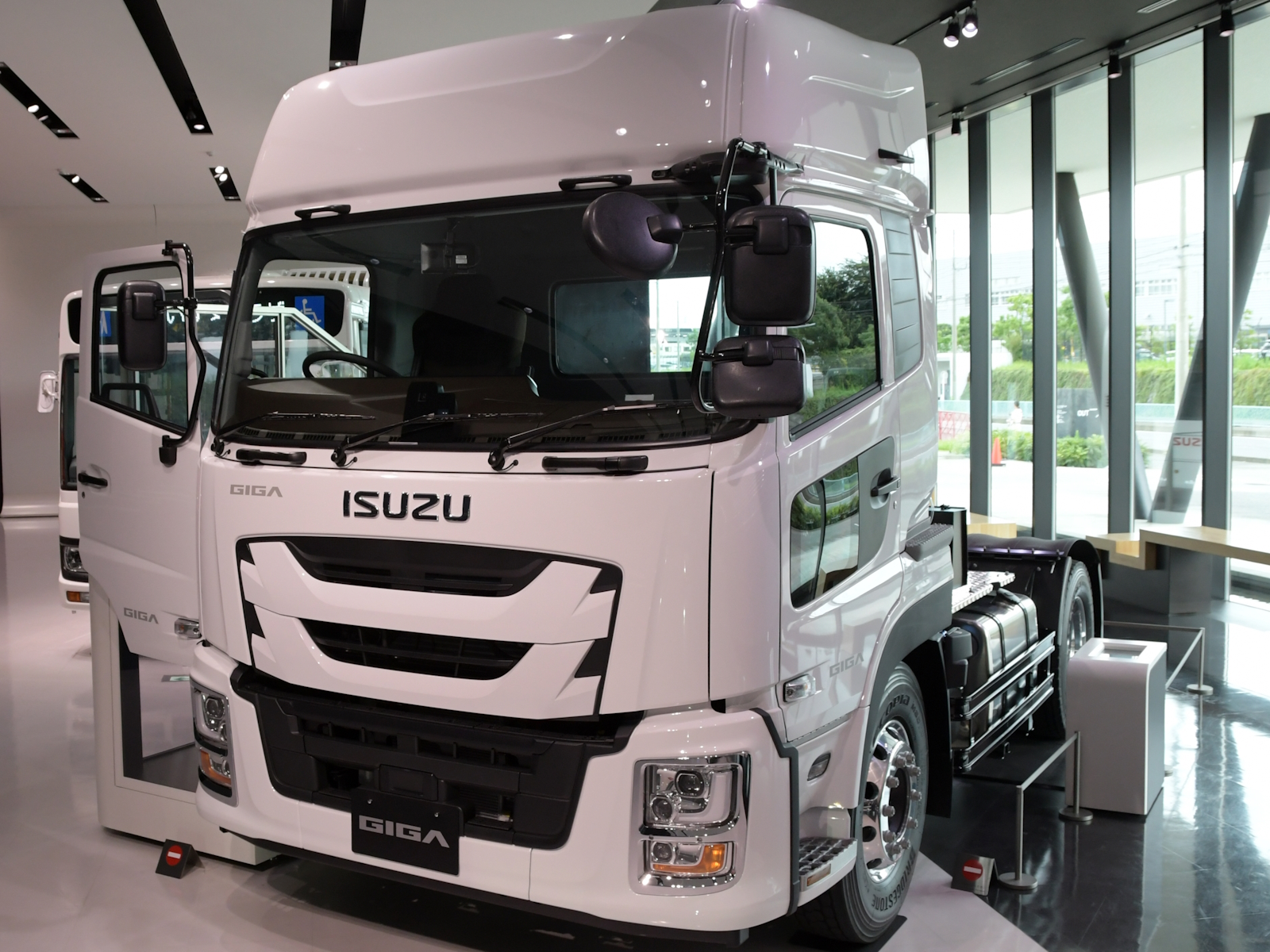
UD Quon-based Giga

The UD Quon-based model was introduced in March 2023.

== Line up ==
- CVR (4 × 2)
- CXK (6 × 2R) NK suspension
- CXM (6 × 2R)
- CYM (6 × 2R) GVW over 20t
- CYL (6 × 2R) GVW 20t super air suspension
- CXG (6 × 2F)
- CXE (6 × 2F) Air suspension
- CYG (6 × 2F) GVW over 20t
- CYE (6 × 2F) GVW 20t super air suspension
- CXY (6 × 4) air suspension
- CXZ (6 × 4)
- CYZ (6 × 4) GVW over 20t
- CYY (6 × 4) GVW 20t super air suspension
- CVZ (low floor 6 × 4) GVW18t specification
- CXZ-J (Low floor 6 × 4)
- CYZ-J (low floor 6 × 4) GVW over 20t
- CYY-J (Low floor 6 × 4) GVW 20t super / air suspension
- CXH (low floor 8 × 4)
- CYH (low floor 8 × 4) GVW over 20t
- CYJ (low floor 8 × 4) GVW 20t super air suspension
- CVS (4 × 4) chassis for snowplows
- CXW (6 × 6) chassis for snowplows
- CYW (6 × 6) GVW 20t super / snowplow chassis
- EXR (4 × 2 semi-tractor)
- EXD (4 × 2 semi-tractor) air suspension
- EXZ (6 × 4 semi-tractor)
- EXY (6 × 4 semi-tractor) air suspension
- EW5
- SG5
- SW5

== Engines ==
"Classification" in the table below indicates the two digits of the three letters of the vehicle model code (C ** or EX * above).

Classification	Engine model	Aspiration	Displacement	Power	Installation period
23	6SD1	Straight-six engine - TCI	9,839 cc	228 kW (310 PS); 250 kW (340 PS)	1994-2005
50	6WA1	Straight-six engine - TCI	12,068 cc	243 kW (330 PS); 265 kW (360 PS); 287 kW (390 PS)	1994-2000
51	6WF1	Straight-six engine - TCI	14,256 cc	243 kW (330 PS); 272 kW (370 PS)	1999-2007
52	6WG1-T	Straight-six engine - TCI	15,681 cc	6WG1-T 213 kW (290 PS); 6WG1-TCI 294 kW (400 PS); 6WG1-TC 309 kW (420 PS); UM6WG1-TC 338 kW (460 PS); 6WG1 382 kW (520 PS)	1997-
60	6NX1	Straight-six engine - TCI	7,790 cc	250 kW (340 PS)	2016-
VC61	6UZ1; 6WG1 by Qingling Isuzu	Straight-six engine - TCI	9,839 cc 15,681 cc	382 kW (520 PS); 338 kW (460 PS); 309 kW (420 PS); 279 kW (380 PS)	2018-
73	6TE1	V6 engine - Naturally aspirated	18,933 cc	243 kW (330 PS); 272 kW (370 PS)	2001-2003
74	8TD1	V8 engine - Naturally aspirated	24,312 cc	302 kW (410 PS); 331 kW (450 PS); 353 kW (480 PS)	2000-2003
75	10TD1	V10 engine - Naturally aspirated	30,390 cc	441 kW (600 PS)	1997-2003
77	6UZ1	Straight-six engine - TCI	9,839 cc	243 kW (330 PS); 279 kW (380 PS); 294 kW (400 PS)	2005-
78	6UV1	Straight-six engine - TCI (CNG)	9,839 cc	243 kW (330 PS)	2015-
80	8PE1	V8 engine - Naturally aspirated	15,201 cc	210 kW (285 PS)	1994-2003
81	10PE1	V10 engine - Naturally aspirated	19,001 cc	239 kW (325 PS); 265 kW (360 PS)	1994-2003
82	12PE1	V12 engine - Naturally aspirated	22,801 cc	283 kW (385 PS); 309 kW (420 PS); 331 kW (450 PS)	1994-2000

== See also ==
- Isuzu Elf
- Isuzu Forward
