= Cooper Motor Corporation =

Coordinates: 01°17′57″S 36°49′39″E

CMC Motors Group Limited
- Company type: Limited
- Industry: Automotive industry
- Founded: 1912
- Founder: Clement Hirtzel
- Headquarters: Nairobi, Kenya
- Area served: East Africa: KM, DJ, KE, TZ, UG, ER, ET, MZ, MS, MW, RE, MG, BI, RW, SO^{1/2}, SC, YT, SS, ZM, ZW
- Products: Automobiles, Buses, Pickups, Tractors and commercial vehicles
- Parent: Al-Futtaim Group
- Website: Homepage (defunct)

The Cooper Motor Corporation, also known as CMC Motors Group Limited, is the fifth-largest importer of vehicles and fifth-largest car-assembly company in Kenya, the largest economy in the East African Community.

== Location ==
The company headquarters are located between Lusaka Road and Bunyala Road in the Industrial Area of Nairobi, the capital of Kenya and the largest city in that country. The manufacturing unit and vehicle assembly plants are on Bunyala Road, while the showrooms are on Lusaka Road. Workshop Road connects the two locations. The coordinates of the company headquarters are:1°17'57.0"S, 36°49'39.0"E (Latitude:-1.299167; Longitude:36.827500).

== History ==
CMC was founded in 1912 by Clement Hirtzel under the name Nairobi Motor Garage, in Nairobi the capital of what was at that time known as British East Africa. The company started its activities with the importation of the Ford Model T. Nairobi Motor Garage was the first company that distributed vehicles in British East Africa, which today is known as the Republic of Kenya. With the initial sales of the Ford Model T, NMG took up 52% market share of automobile sales in Kenya at that time.

In July 1948, the company was bought by one Mr. Allen and another Mr. Cooper, who had relocated from the United Kingdom to Nairobi. The company's name was changed to Cooper Motor Corporation Private Limited, to reflect the new ownership. New products were introduced including the Land Rover, which was a success in a lot of African markets. Over the decades, the company has developed into a major importer for several different brands. CMC has maintained a relationship with Ford Motor Company and have sold a variety of pick-up trucks and van models from the American vehicle manufacturer.

Over the years, the company introduced other brands like Volkswagen, Mazda, Škoda, Maruti, Suzuki, Iveco, Nissan Diesel, Bobcat, Liebherr, Case CE, Case IH, New Holland into the market.

CMC's CKD assembling of cars began in 1974 with the new Volkswagen Golf. It was followed by the Volkswagen Santana and by the models Volkswagen Jetta and Volkswagen Transporter in the mid-nineties.

For the Mazda brand, the 323, 626 and Rustler were assembled in Kenya. Currently the CMC is only assembling the truck model T3500 and the BT-50 for Mazda.

CMC next introduced the Maruti brand to the Kenyan market with the small car Maruti 800 and the SUV Maruti Gypsy King. The Maruti range was completed with the Maruti Omni some years later. The latest product is the Maruti Suzuki Swift which is only imported and not official distributed through CMC.

In the 1990s the CMC introduced the Suzuki brand to the East African market with the Suzuki Vitara and the Suzuki Alto. Later the Vitara was replaced by the Suzuki Grand Vitara and the model range was completed with the Suzuki Jimny and Suzuki SX4.

The most recently introduced brand was in 2004 with Škoda and their small car Škoda Fabia, followed by the sedan version, which is assembled as the Škoda Octavia for the East African market.

For the Ford partnership, the CMC had assembled the Ford Escort, the Ford Telstar and the Ford Laser. It assembled models like the Ford F-250 (2004 version), the Ford Ranger THA (2004 version), Ford Focus C307 and the Ford Territory (SX model).

In 2023 Ford, Suzuki and Mazda, terminated their distribution contracts with the group and it exited the passenger vehicle market.

== Assembled vehicles ==
- Iveco AT720 Prime Mover
- Iveco Euro-Trakker
- Iveco MP380
- Nissan Diesel CB31 Bus (62 seats)
- Nissan Diesel CB46 Bus (67 seats)
- Nissan Diesel CWB450 Truck
- Nissan Diesel MKB210 Bus (62 seats)
- Nissan Diesel MKB210 Truck
- Nissan Diesel NU41 Bus (29 seats, also known as Swara)
- Nissan Diesel NU41 Truck (also known as Swara)
- Nissan Diesel PKF210 Truck
- Mazda T3500
- Mazda BT-50
- Škoda Fabia
- Ford F-250 (2004 version)
- Ford Ranger THA (2004 version)
- Ford Focus C307
- Ford Territory (SX model)
- Ford Mustang (GT, EcoBoost)

== Corporate structure ==
As of February 2015, the holding company whose shares were previously listed on the Nairobi Securities Exchange is known as CMC Holdings Limited. The subsidiaries owned by the holding company include the following:

1. CMC Motors Group – Nairobi, Kenya
2. CMC Motors Finance – Nairobi, Kenya
3. Cooper Motors Corporation – Kampala, Uganda
4. Hughes Motors Limited – Dar es Salaam, Tanzania
5. Hughes Agriculture Limited – Dar es Salaam, Tanzania

On 16 March 2026, the court of appeal of Kenya overturned a ruling by the Employment and Labour Relations Court that had awarded Yasser Swaleh, former Ford Brand Manager at CMC Motors Group Limited, KSh 4.4 million in compensation for unfair termination. The court ruled that his employment was terminated lawfully for misreporting of vehicle sales and inflated expected incomes.

== Ownership ==
CMC Holdings Limited and all its subsidiaries in Kenya, Uganda and Tanzania are wholly owned by the Al-Futtaim Group, based in the United Arab Emirates.

== Planned Closure ==
In a 17 January 2025 statement, the company announced plans to wind down its operations and eventually exit the Kenya, Tanzania and Uganda markets. Citing "sustained market challenges, including economic pressures, currency depreciation, and rising operational costs." By July 2025, its website "www.cmcmotors.com" was defunct.

The decision was despite years of effort to engineer a turnaround. These efforts included the firing of 160 workers in 2017, 110 in 2018 and 169 employees in 2023, as part of the 2023 restructuring initiative aimed at revitalizing its business.

In a press release dated Monday, 24 April 2023, the Managing Director Sakib Eltaff, said "Three leading brands i.e. Ford, Suzuki and Mazda have terminated and/or given notice of termination of their distributorship contracts with CMC Group starting today until Q3 2023. CMC will therefore cease distribution of three passenger vehicle brands it has offered in the market in the next few months,"

The group conceded that the market dynamics left "no viable path for sustainable growth."

On 4 June 2025, New Holland announced that Inchcape Kenya would take over its products from CMC,with Inchcape making its first delivery on 1 August 2025.
