= Nissan Diesel Space Runner RP =

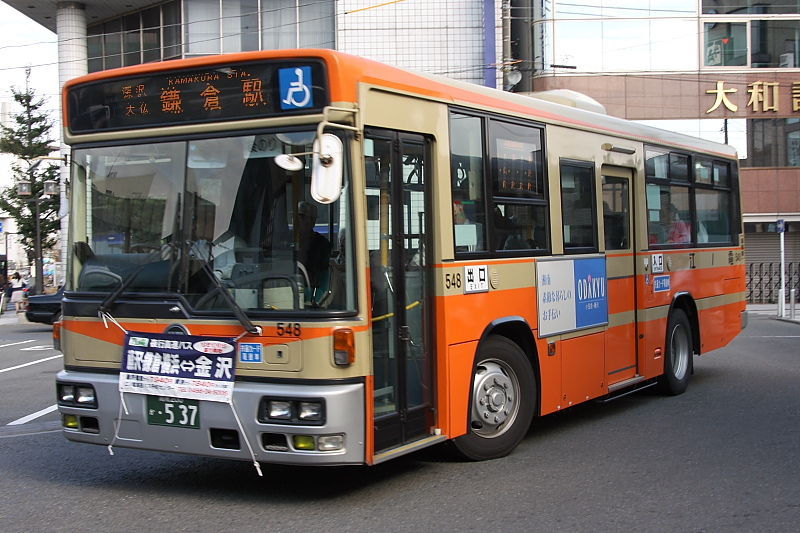

Overview
- Manufacturer: Nissan Diesel
- Production: 1986–2007

Body and chassis
- Class: Complete bus
- Body style: Single-decker bus
- Doors: 2
- Floor type: Step entrance Low entry
- Related: Nissan Diesel UA

Powertrain
- Engine: FE6, J07E
- Transmission: UD (manual), ZF(automatic)

Dimensions
- Wheelbase: 4800mm, 5300mm
- Length: 11200mm or 11900mm
- Width: 2500mm
- Height: 3000mm

Chronology
- Successor: Nissan Diesel Space Runner RA

The Nissan Diesel Space Runner RP (kana:日産ディーゼル・スペースランナーRP) was an integrally-constructed heavy-duty single-decker bus produced by the Japanese manufacturer Nissan Diesel between 1986 until 2007. The range was primarily available as a public bus and as a complete bus.

== Models ==
The Nissan Diesel Space Runner RP is available as either in step-entrance or low-entry variants. Its step-entrance compartment is known as Two Step whereas its low-entry compartment is known as One Step. A common design is that it has a double-curvature windscreen with a rounded roof dome similar to its successor, the Nissan Diesel Space Runner RA with a separately mounted destination indicator.

- P-RP80 (1986)
- U-RP210 (1991)
- KC-RP211/250 (1995)
- KL-RP252 (2000)
- PK-RP360 (2006)
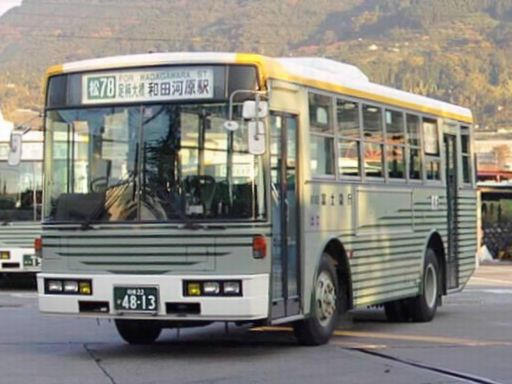
Nissan Diesel Space Runner RP U-RP210GAN

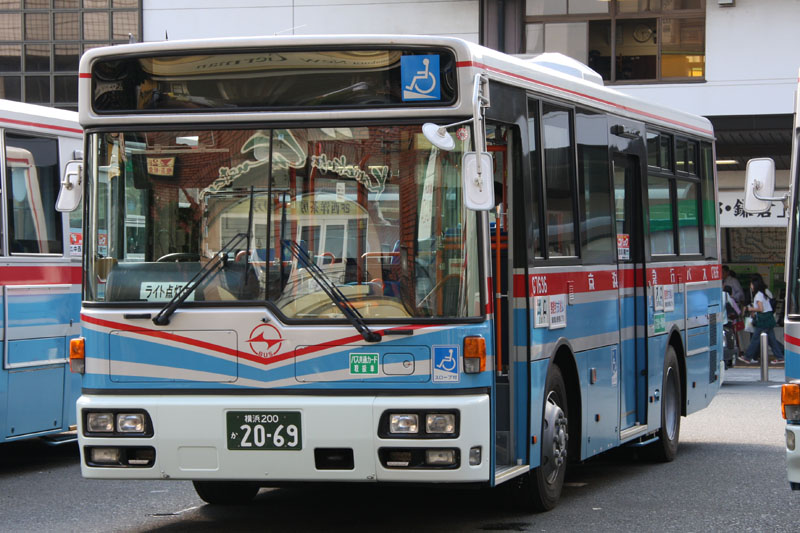
Nissan Diesel Space Runner RP PK-RP360GAN
