= Dongfeng Nengdi =

Chinese truck manufacturer

Dongfeng Nengdi (Hangzhou) Motor
- Formerly: Dongfeng Nissan Diesel Motor; Dongvo (Hangzhou) Truck
- Type: Subsidiary
- Industry: Automotive
- Founded: May 1996
- Headquarters: Hangzhou, Zhejiang, China
- Area served: China
- Products: Trucks; Coaches
Owner
Dongfeng Motor Group	(50%)
Dongfeng Motor (HK) International	(50%)

Chinese name
- Simplified Chinese: 东风能迪（杭州）汽车有限公司
- Traditional Chinese: 東風能迪（杭州）汽車有限公司
Transcriptions
Standard Mandarin
- Hanyu Pinyin: Dōngfēng Néngdí (Hángzhōu) Qìchē Yǒuxiàn Gōngsī

Alternative Chinese name
- Simplified Chinese: 东风能迪
- Traditional Chinese: 東風能迪
Transcriptions
Standard Mandarin
- Hanyu Pinyin: Dōngfēng Néngdí
- Website: dnd-motor.com

Dongfeng Nengdi (Hangzhou) Motor Co., Ltd. also known as just DND is a Chinese manufacturer of fire trucks.

== History ==
former logo

The company was known as Dongfeng Nissan Diesel Motor Co., Ltd. (simplified Chinese: 东风日产柴汽车有限公司; traditional Chinese: 東風日產柴汽車有限公司; pinyin: Dōngfēng Rìchǎn Chái Qìchē Yǒuxiàn Gōngsī), which was a joint venture between the Dongfeng Motor Group and UD Trucks (now part of Isuzu) established in 1996. They held 50% of its shares respectively.

The company was later renamed to Dongvo (Hangzhou) Truck Co., Ltd. (simplified Chinese: 东沃(杭州)卡车有限公司; traditional Chinese: 東沃(杭州)卡車有限公司; pinyin: Dōngwò (Hángzhōu) Kǎchē Yǒuxiàn Gōngsī) in 2013, and in 2017 to Dongfeng Nengdi (Hangzhou) Motor Co., Ltd..

== Plants ==
Plant type	Location	Year opened	Year closed	Notes
Heavy truck chassis assembly plant	Hangzhou, Zhejiang, China	1996	active	

== Products ==
- KuTeng (Chinese: 酷腾), based on UD Quester
