= UD Quester =

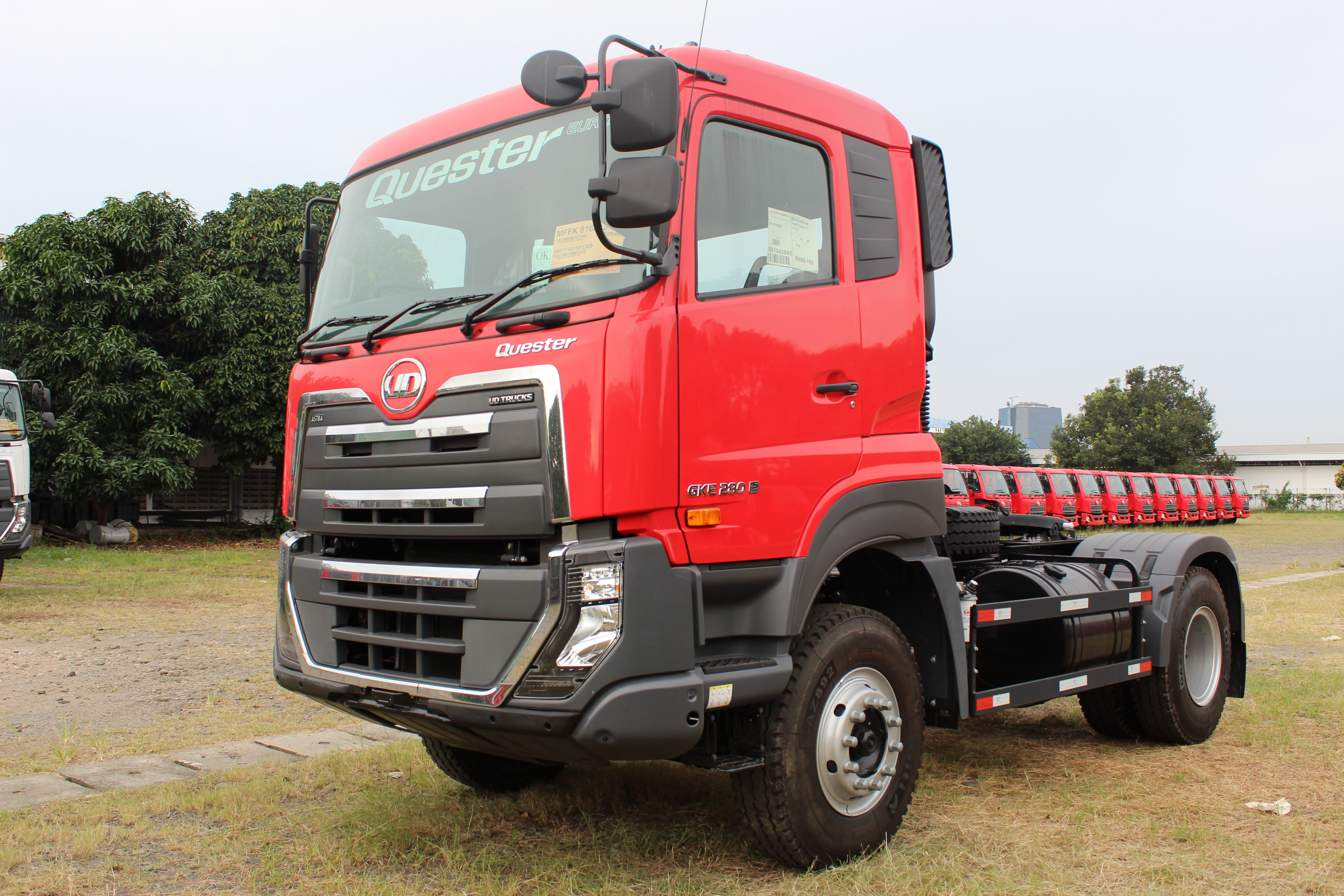
- UD Quester GKE 280 Euro 5

Overview
- Manufacturer: UD Trucks
- Also called: Eicher Pro 8000 Series (India) Dongvo KuTeng Isuzu S&E Series
- Production: 2013–present

Body and chassis
- Class: Truck
- Body style: Truck (standard cab)
- Related: UD Croner; UD Condor; UD Quon

Powertrain
- Engine: 7.7L GH8E (220-350hp, based on Volvo D8), 11L GH11E (370-460hp, based on Volvo D11)
- Transmission: 6-speed manual, 9-speed manual, 12-speed manual, ESCOT-E Automated Manual Transmission

Chronology
- Predecessor: Nissan Diesel CWM

The UD Quester is a line of heavy-duty commercial vehicle produced by UD Trucks with Volvo Group. It is also related with the new generation of the Quon series made in Japan.

== About ==
In 2013 truck was the first UD product which was developed for export market which boost the Volvo's strategy to develop product for developing markets especially in Asia and Africa. UD Trucks formerly Nissan Diesel is a part of Volvo Group which gave Volvo steady grounds to develop Quester, a heavy-duty truck for the developing markets. Developed for emerging markets, the truck was manufactured with high power while keeping lower cost.

The truck was powered by a 10.8-litre engine, producing 280hp to 420hp which was being used by Volvo and Renault in other markets with minor tweaks like using unit injectors instead of common-rail, manual gearbox instead of the automatic on Volvo, steel multi-leaf spring instead of the air-suspension and a Euro 3 engine instead of a Euro 6 with payload of 80 tons for the 6x4 tractor. This minor difference brought the cost to lower levels while keeping the same power output.

Lower payload models of the Quester had Volvo 7.7 litre engine, which were tweaked variants of the Volvo’s FL/FE and Renault’s D range mid-duty trucks. The production started in Bangkok, Thailand to serve the domestic market and later for export.

== Models ==
- 4×2 Rigid
- 6×2 TAG
- 6×4 Rigid
- 8×4 Rigid
- 4×2 Tractor
- 6×2 TAG Tractor
- 6×4 Tractor

== Drivetrain ==
Model	Fuel	Displacement (ltr)	Power (hp)	Torque (nm)	Transmission
GH8E 220	Diesel	7.7	220	850	6S MT
GH8E 250	Diesel	7.7	250	950	6/9S MT
GH8E 280	Diesel	7.7	280	1050	6/9S MT
GH8E 330	Diesel	7.7	330	1200	9S MT
GH11E 370	Diesel	10.8	370	1700	9/12S MT / 12S AT
GH11E 390	Diesel	10.8	390	1800	9/12S MT / 12S AT
GH11E 420	Diesel	10.8	420	2000	9/12S MT / 12S AT
GH11E 440 EU3	Diesel	10.8	440	2010	9/12S MT / 12S AT
GH11E 460 EU5	Diesel	10.8	460	2240	9/12S MT / 12S AT
VEDX8 BSIII	Diesel	7.7	280	1050	9S MT
VEDX8 BSVI	Diesel	7.7	350	1350	9S MT/AT

== History ==
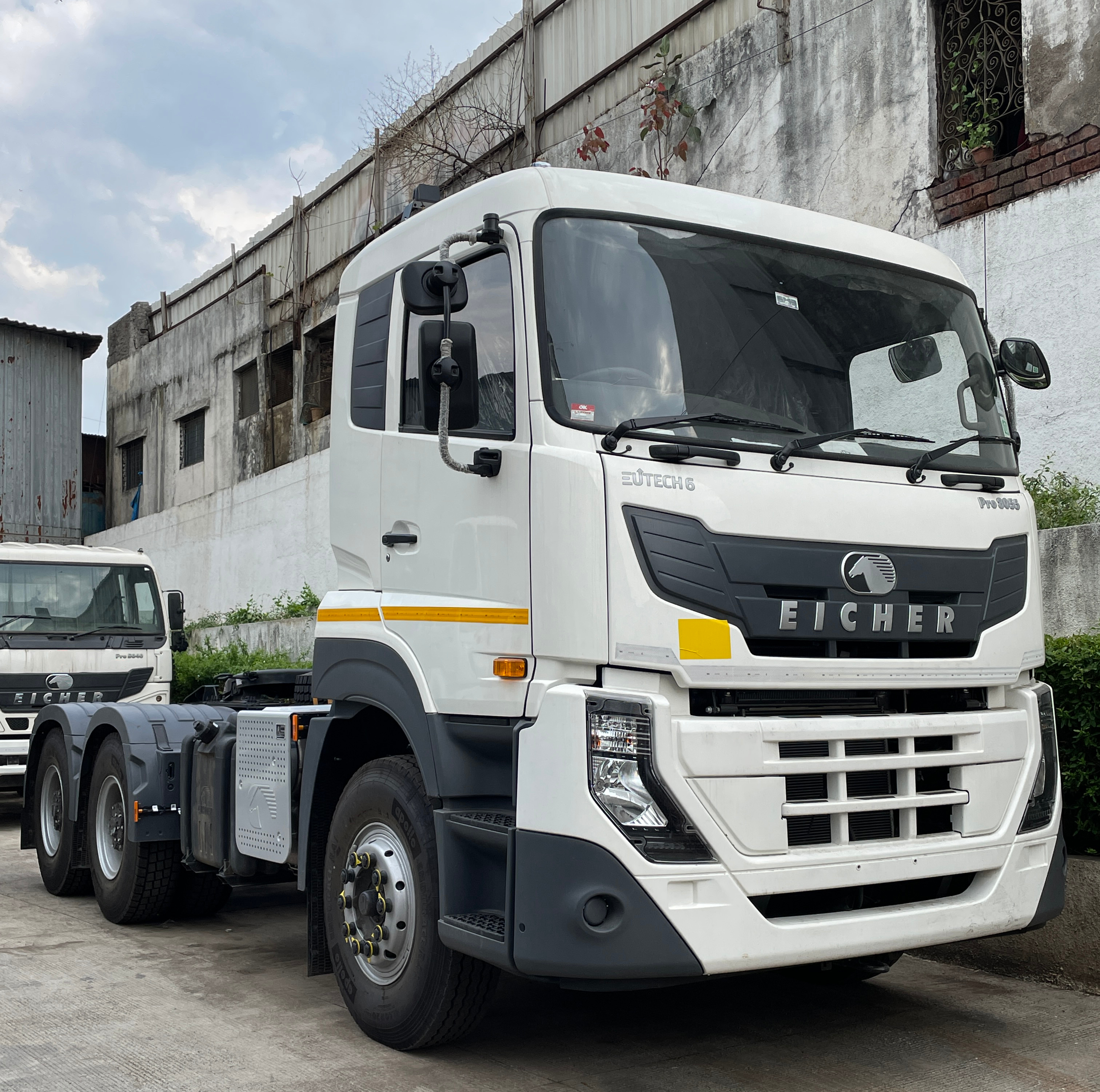
Volvo Eicher Commercial Vehicles (VECV) Pro8055 6x4 tractor truck in India

2013 Launched in Asia

By 2015 UD Trucks South Africa (UDTSA) started to assemble Thailand imported knocked down units of UD Quester in their Rosslyn facility in Pretoria. Total of 13 variations of the trucks are assembled in the facility which caters to 18 countries in total.

Since 2015 in India, this model is sold under Pro 8000 series name by VE Commercial Vehicles Limited's brand Eicher Trucks and Buses, which is jointly owned subsidiary of Volvo and Eicher motors. Manufactured at their Pithampur plant, it is available in heavy duty dump truck and tractor configuration, equipped with VEDX8 engine delivering 280-350 hp.

2017 Launched in North and South America

2018 Volvo Pakistan Limited (VPL) which is part of Panasian Group, a Lahore based company, launched the UD Quester in Pakistan. VPL is authorized dealer of Volvo Trucks, Volvo Buses, Volvo Construction Equipment, Volvo Penta and UD Trucks. The company has been handling operations for Volvo in Pakistan since 1970s.

In 2019 UD Trucks launched a new line of Quester trucks which featured higher horsepower output engines and brand's own automated manual transmission Easy Safe Controlled Transmission (ESCOT) which was introduced in 1995 and currently in its sixth generation and named ESCOT-VI.

In April 2021 Isuzu Motors Ltd another Japanese automobile manufacturer acquired UD Trucks from its former parent company Volvo Trucks. After the acquisition Isuzu started manufacturing its new S&E series heavy-duty trucks based on UD Quester in August 2024 at UD Trucks Samut Prakan facility in Thailand. The new S&E series has some exterior design changes to match the Isuzu trucks line up available in rigid with 25–41 tons GVW and tractor truck 36–80 tons GCW which makes it the highest capacity truck in its lineup above the Isuzu Giga (C&E series) which is based on UD Quon. The truck is developed for ASEAN, the Middle East, and Central and South American markets where UD itself is present already.

== Name ==
It's named by "quest".

In China, this model is named as KuTeng (Chinese: 酷腾), and is sold by Dongvo.

== Alternative fuel ==
Volvo Eicher Commercial Vehicles displayed the Pro8055 4x2 LNG-CNG Hybrid tractor truck at Bharat Mobility Global Expo in 2023. The tractor can operate on both LNG-CNG using electronic and technology from Volvo Group and same VEGX8 7.7 liter engine producing 260hp and 1000nm of torque supported by a 9-speed manual gearbox fuel tank and DEF tanks are replaced with LNG tank on its right side and CNG tanks the left side giving it maximum range of 700km the wheelbase of the truck is 3,650 mm shorter than the ongoing 6x4 tractor.

== See also ==
- UD Trucks
- UD Quon
- UD Croner
- UD Kuzer
- UD SLF
- Volvo
- Volvo Trucks
