= UD SLF =

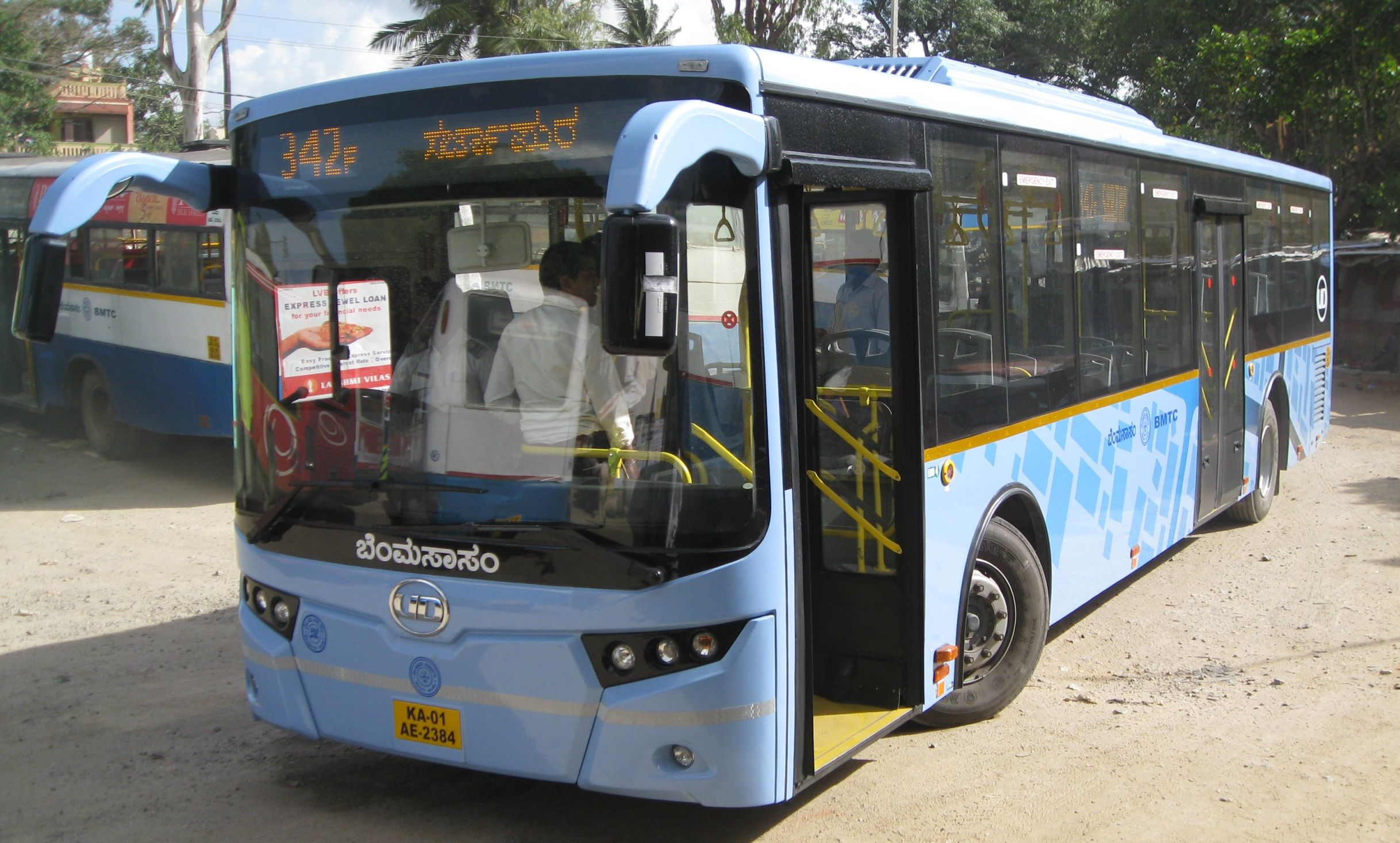

Overview
- Manufacturer: UD Trucks
- Production: 2015–present

Body and chassis
- Class: Complete bus Bus chassis
- Body style: Single-decker bus
- Doors: 2 doors
- Floor type: Semi-low-floor (640mm)
- Related: UD BRT

Powertrain
- Engine: GH8 (230 hp at 2200rpm)
- Capacity: 36 seated
- Transmission: ZF 6-speed automatic

Dimensions
- Length: 12 metres
- Width: 2.5 metres
- Height: 3.0 metres

The UD SLF is a rear-engined single-decker bus, and also a semi-low-floor city bus made by the UD Trucks. The other city buses of UD is the UD BRT. The BRT is an articulated bus unlike the SLF, which is a rigid bus.

== About ==
The SLF is named from semi low-floor. (Incidentally, the BRT is named from bus rapid transit. )

It has 36 seats and Denso air-conditioning, and is 12 meters length.

The GH8 engine is 6 cylinder 8 liter Euro IV diesel engine (turbocharged and intercooled), and ZF 6-speed automatic (230 hp at 2200rpm).

Anti-lock Brake System, Door Brake System, Neutral Bus Stopping and 3-point seat belts are installed.

The manufacturer of the bus is UD Trucks. The body of prototype was made by Volvo Buses India, but the body of main model is made by Volvo/SM Kannapa JV plant.

== History ==
In 2014, the Volvo Group introduced UD Buses project. The UD Buses is included the Volvo Buses, and includes city buses and coaches. The market of UD Buses is India at first, but it will be other Asian country finally, too.

In 2015, the prototype of the UD SLF was started running at Bangalore Metropolitan Transport Corporation in Bangalore.

== See also ==
- UD Trucks
- UD Buses
- UD BRT
- UD Quester
- UD Croner
- UD Kuzer
- Volvo Buses
