= UD Croner =

Overview
- Manufacturer: UD Trucks
- Also called: Eicher Pro 6000 series (India)
- Production: 2017–present

Body and chassis
- Class: Truck
- Body style: Truck
- Related: UD Condor; UD Quester

Powertrain
- Engine: GH5E, GH8E
- Transmission: 6-speed manual or 6-speed automatic, depending on market

The UD Croner (Japanese: UD・クローナー; UD Kurōnā) is a line of medium-duty commercial vehicles produced by UD Trucks with Volvo Group and sold outside of Japan. In India, this model is sold under Pro 3010 series name by VE Commercial Vehicles Limited's brand Eicher Trucks and Buses. It is available in semi high deck, low deck and high deck

== History ==
In 2017, it started selling in Ecuador and South Africa. It won the 2017 Good Design Award.

== Models ==
- LKE : 12t - 14t
- MKE : 10.4t - 11t
- PKE : 15t - 17t

== See also ==
- UD Condor
- UD Kuzer
- UD Quester
- UD SLF
