= UD Trucks =

Japanese company

UD Trucks Corporation
- Native name: UDトラックス株式会社
- Romanized name: UD Torakkusu Kabushiki-gaisha
- Formerly: Nissan Diesel
- Type: Subsidiary
- Industry: Automotive
- Founded: December 1, 1935; 90 years ago
- Founder: Kenzo Adachi
- Headquarters: Ageo, Saitama, Japan
- Key people: Koichi Ito (President & CEO) Kouji Maruyama (Adviser) Tetsuya Ikemoto (Chairman)
- Products: Trucks
- Parent: Nissan, Isuzu
- Website: udtrucks.com - International

UD Trucks Corporation (UDトラックス株式会社, UD Torakkusu Kabushikigaisha) is a Japanese company whose principal business is the manufacturing and sales of diesel trucks, buses, bus chassis and special-purpose vehicles. Its headquarters are located in Ageo, Saitama, Japan. The company is a wholly owned subsidiary of Isuzu since 2021. Until 2010, the company was known as Nissan Diesel.

The UD name was originally used for the company's Uniflow Diesel Engine (a two-stroke diesel engine), developed in 1955, but is now marketed as meaning "Ultimate Dependability".

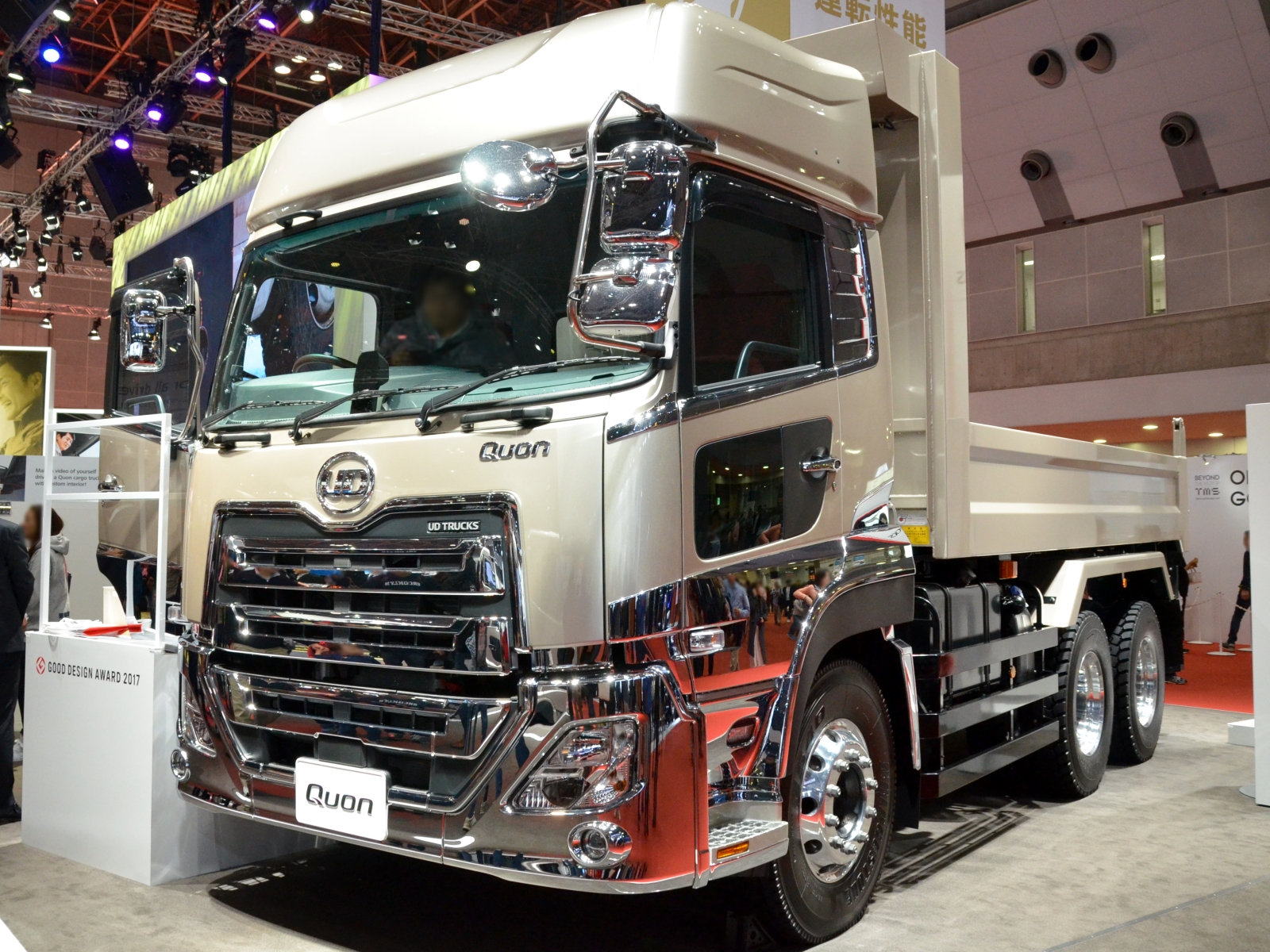
2017 UD Quon CW dump truck

== History ==
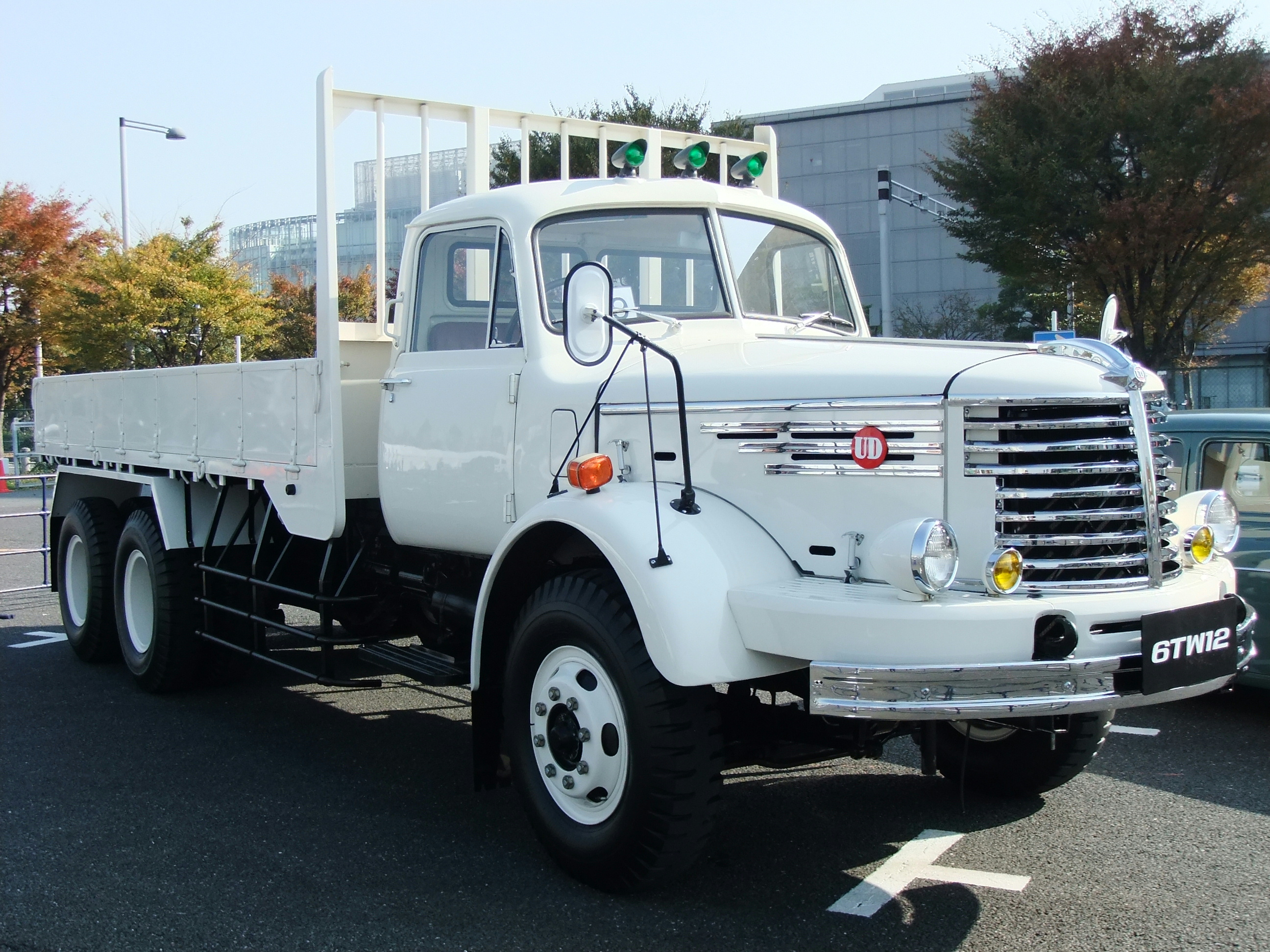
Nissan Diesel 6TW12

=== 1935–1949 ===
In December 1935, Nihon Diesel Industries, Ltd, in Kawaguchi, Japan on the outskirts of Tokyo was established under the leadership of Kenzo Adachi, where he purchased diesel engine schematics from a Krupp-Junkers patent. The company started production of KD-series 2-cycle diesel engines after entering into partnership and technology exchange with Friedrich Krupp AG. In November 1939, to test the durability of the LD1 truck, the company went on a 3,000 km (1,864.1 mi) test drive across Japan. The drive went to the villages of Hakone, Osaka, Kyoto, Gero, Ikaho, Niigata and Aizu before returning to Kawaguchi. The route was on very primitive mountain roads and very rural conditions. The truck returned 13 days later on November 20 without incurring any failure, and soon the trucks’ reliability became known. In 1940 production of 4.5-ton-payload TT6 series trucks started, and in 1942 the company was now known as Kanega-Fuchi Diesel Co., Ltd. In development of 7.5-ton-payload TN93 series trucks, featuring the largest payload capacity in the Japanese market, and the nation's first monocoque-type BR3 series buses with rear-mounted engines. In 1946 the company name changed to Minsei Industries, Ltd. In 1949 development of 7.5-ton-payload TN93 series trucks started.

=== 1950–1959 ===
In 1950 Minsei Diesel Industries, Ltd. was spun off from Minsei Industries; and the company was on the way to becoming a comprehensive transport equipment manufacturer. In 1955 the UD name was born, when Minsei Diesel Industries introduced a range uniflow-scavenging 2-cycle diesel engine. The UD stood for "Uniflow Diesel", named after the engine they had invented for use in their trucks. The production of various trucks and buses with 81 kW (110 PS) UD3, 110 kW (150 PS) UD4 and 169 kW (230 PS) UD6 engines began. In 1957 the development of Japan's first RFA series air-suspension buses and 10-ton-payload 6TW10 series trucks called "Jumbo" in overseas markets began.

=== 1960–1969 ===
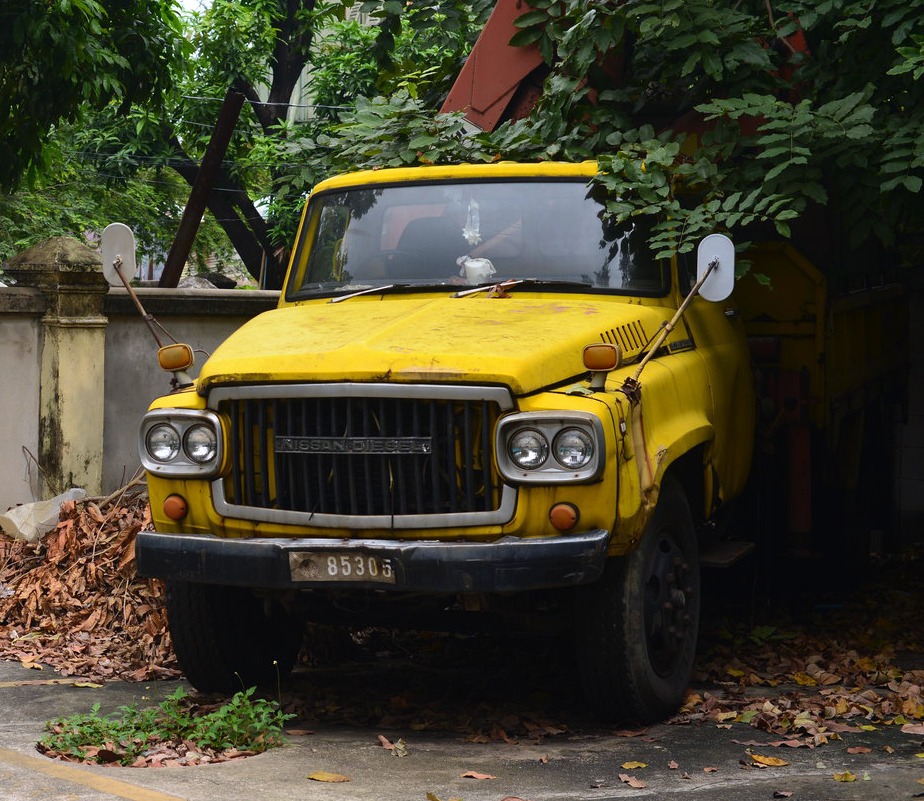
Nissan Diesel 780

In 1960, Nissan Motor Co., Ltd. acquired Minsei Diesel, and was renamed Nissan Diesel Motor Co., Ltd. Forward-control trucks and truck tractors were also introduced. In 1963, there was the initial production of compact 4-cycle 40 kW (55PS) SD20 and 44 kW (60PS) SD22 diesel engines. 70 to 80-ton crane-carrier truck series were also introduced to the line-up. 1969 saw the introduction of 4-cycle 136 kW (185PS) PD6 and 99 kW (135 PS) ND6 diesel engines for heavy-duty vehicles. Diesel products were sold in Japan at a separate dealership sales channel called Nissan Diesel. In 1969, the 780-series replaced the 680-series bonneted truck.

=== 1970–1979 ===
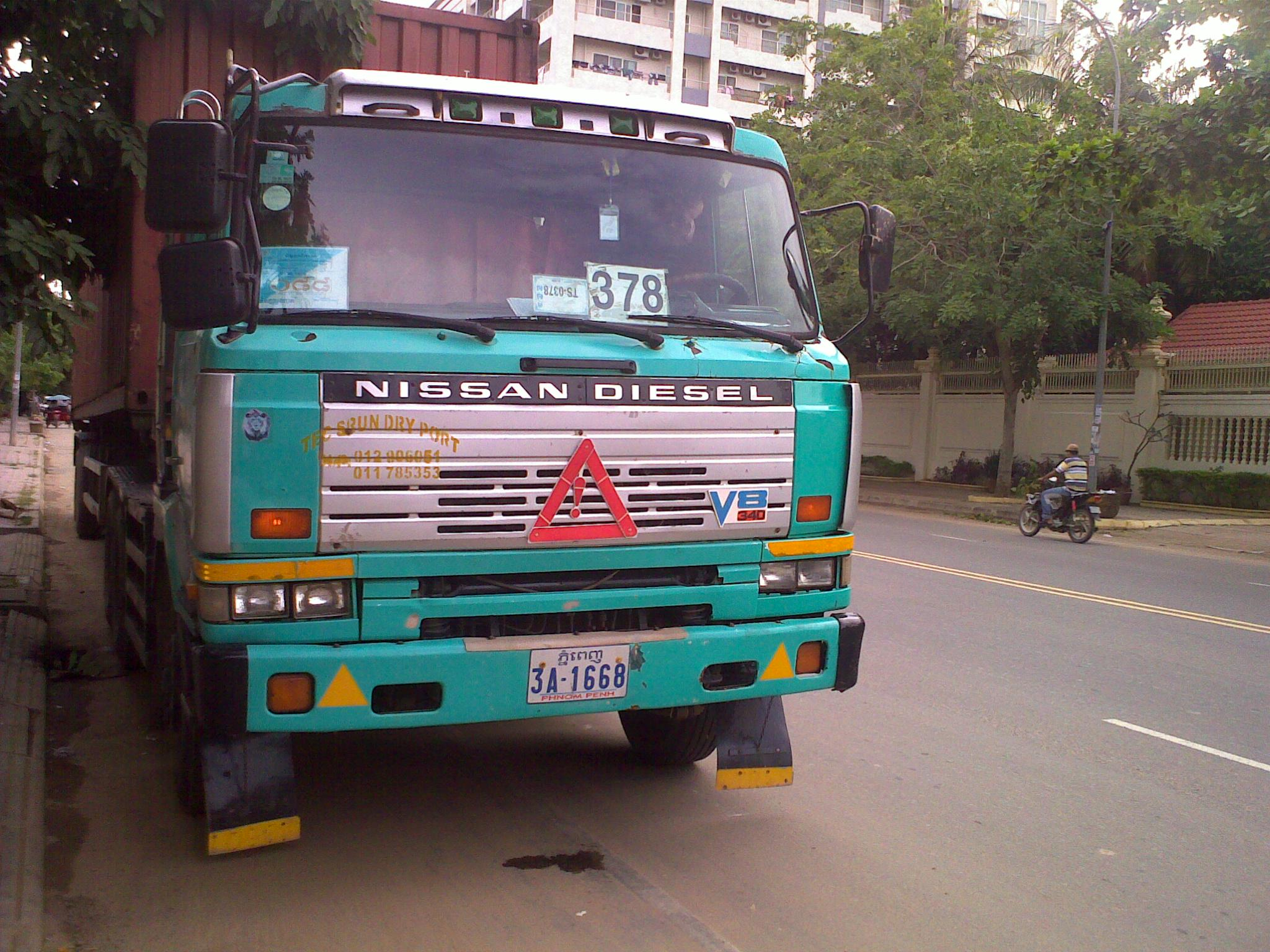
Nissan Diesel CW 340

In 1971 the heavy Nissan Diesel C-series arrived, being replaced by the second generation in 1979. 1972 saw the marketing of V-type 206 kW (280 PS) RE8/RF8 and 257 kW (350 PS) RE10 diesel engines. In 1973, light-duty trucks were produced for the Nissan Motor Company.

=== 1980–1989 ===
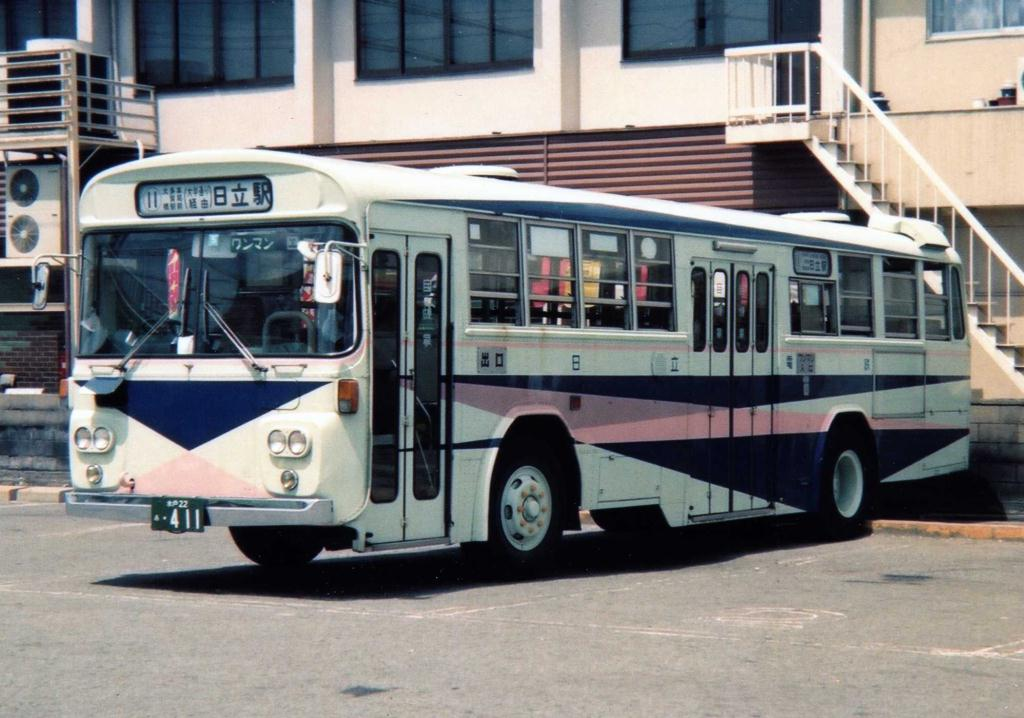
U31L

In 1982 there was the introduction of new forward-control cab for the CWA52/45 series trucks (sold as the Nissan Diesel Resona in Japan), CKA-T series truck tractors and ultra-modern U(A)21, U(A)31, RA51 series buses. As of 1985 the company had a wide range of light-, medium- and heavy-duty trucks, as well as buses and special-purpose vehicles such as crane carriers. In 1989 there was an agreement with IVECO of Italy to jointly develop low-pollution diesel engines.

=== 1990–1999 ===
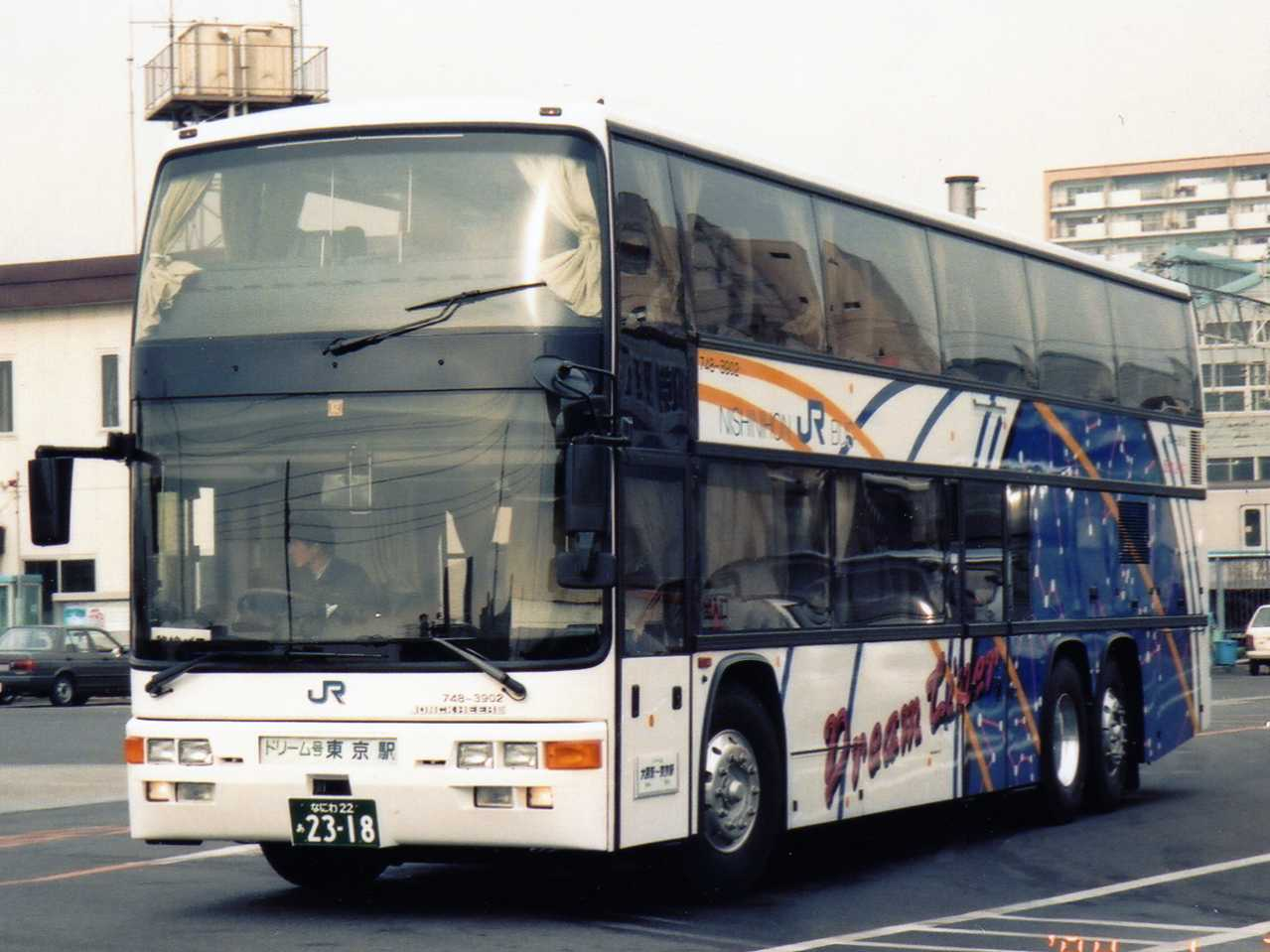
Jonckheere Monaco

In 1992 Nissan Diesel Philippines Corp. started manufacturing deluxe coaches in cooperation with Jonckheere Bus & Coach NV/SA of Belgium. In 1995 Nissan Diesel produced its two millionth vehicles since commencing production in May 1950. 1996 brought about the establishment of PT Astra Nissan Diesel Indonesia, a joint venture company with Marubeni Corporation and Astra International, and the Dongfeng Nissan Diesel Motor Co., Ltd, a joint venture company with Sumitomo Corporation and Dongfeng Motor Corporation.

=== 2000–2009 ===
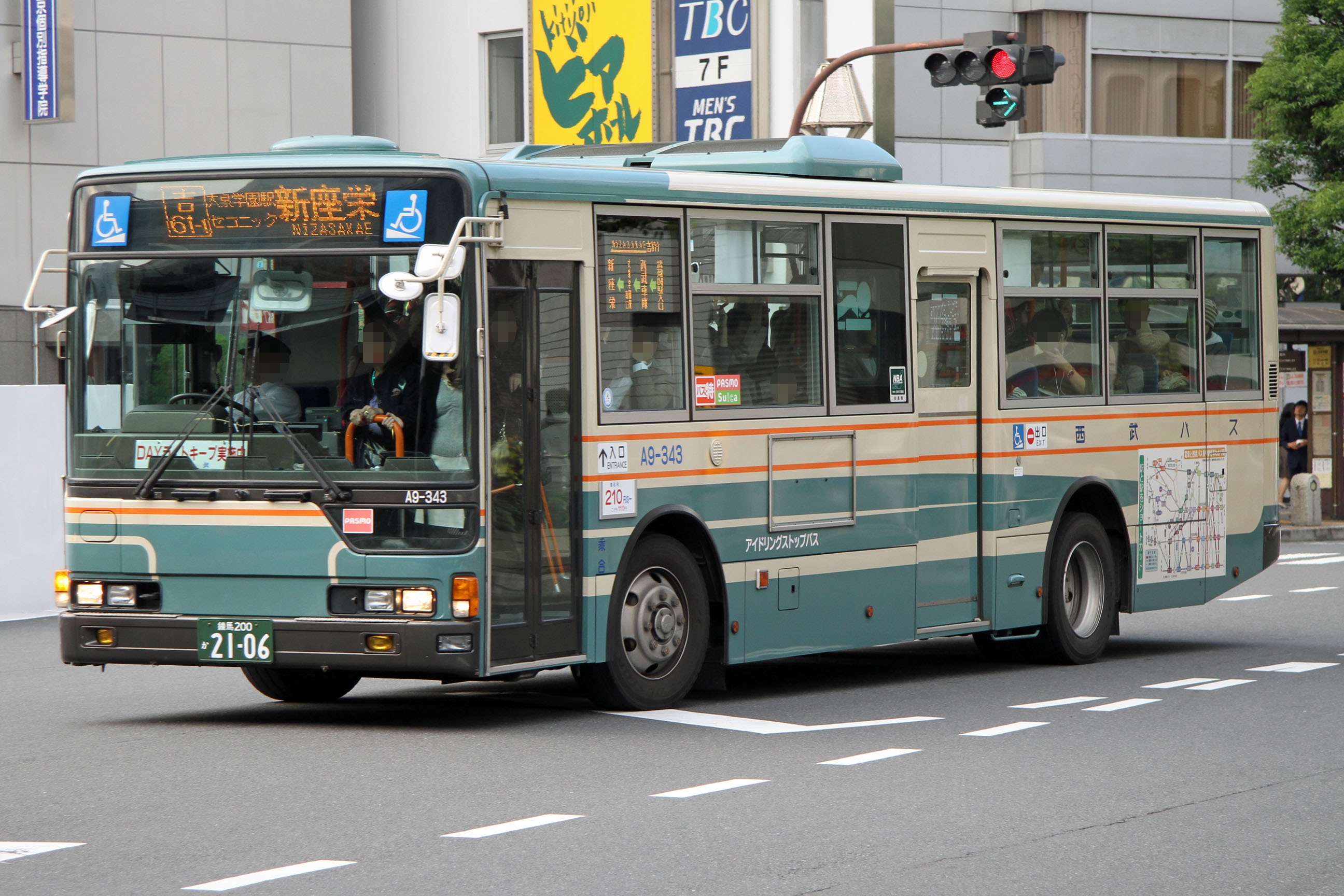
Space Runner A

In 2000 Nissan Diesel introduced new heavy-duty trucks in Japan and Asian countries. It also acquired the sales operation from Nissan Diesel Sales Company. In 2003, Nissan Motor and Nissan Diesel reached a basic agreement on a light-duty truck joint venture. There was also the signing of development assistance contract for air suspension of buses with China's Dongfeng Motor Corporation.

In 2006, Volvo purchased a 13% shareholding in Nissan Diesel with an option to acquire Nissan's remaining 6%. In 2007, Volvo increased it shareholding to 96%.

After the Volvo takeover, Nissan Diesel's business relations with Nissan Motors continued as normal and the Nissan Diesel and UD brand names remained unchanged. 2007 also marked the launch of UD360 training academy as a dealer and customer resource center throughout the North American region. Later renamed UD Trucks Academy to coincide with the launch of Volvo Trucks Academy and Mack Truck Academy a refined core focus on job role, tenure based training offering both in person and online learning. Volvo also acquired Renault Trucks in 2010.

Starting from 2007, the OEM supply agreement between Nissan Diesel and Mitsubishi Fuso Truck & Bus Corporation became effective, with both companies supplying engines to each other for use in new buses, and supplying some buses to each other with the partner's badge.

=== 2010–present ===
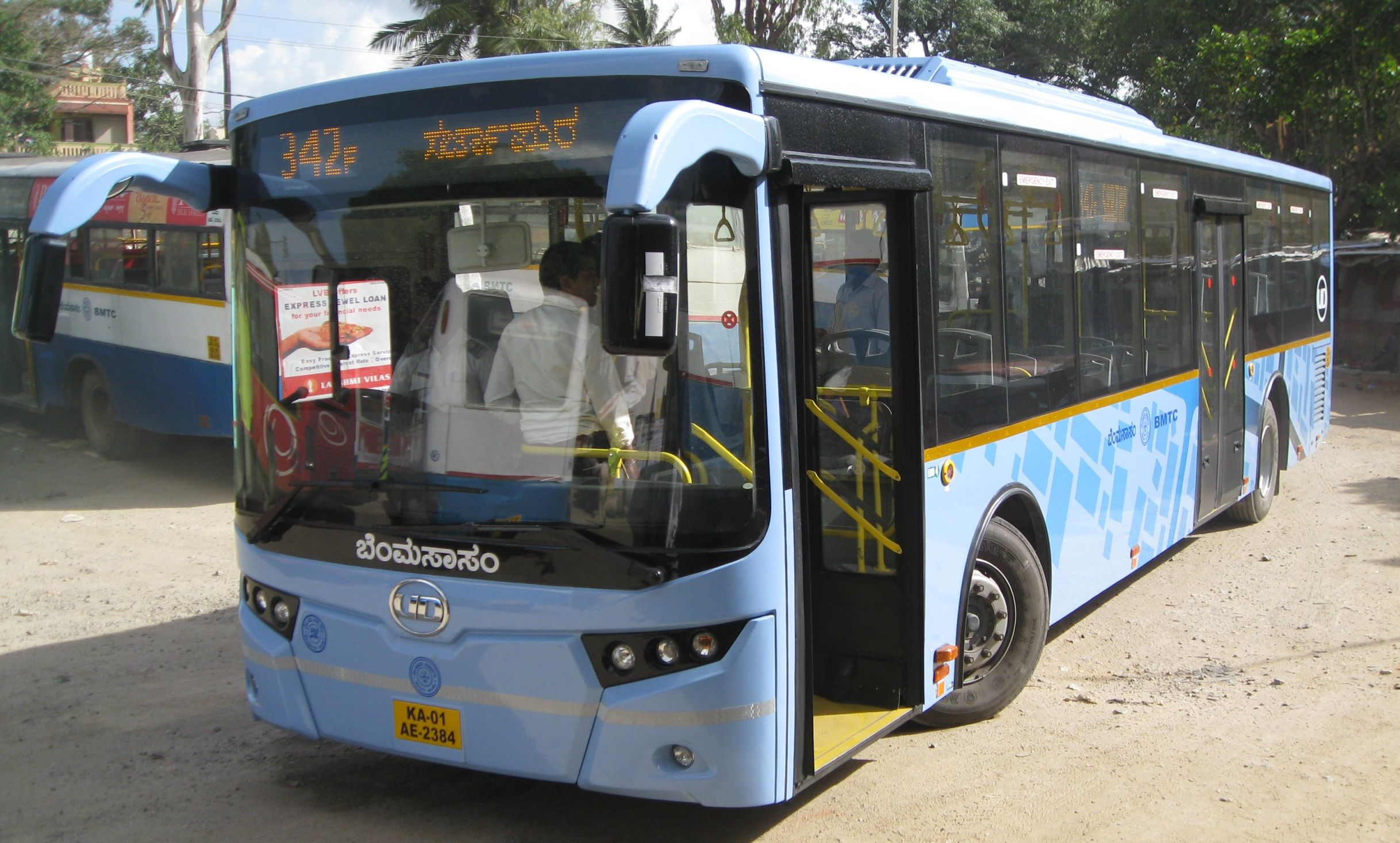
A Volvo UD bus on trial runs in Bangalore, India

On February 1, 2010, Nissan Diesel changed its name to UD Trucks. At the same time Nissan Diesel Trucks Japan, a 100% owned sales company of UD Trucks in Japan, changed its name to UD Trucks Japan.

On September 12, 2012, UD Trucks announced that it would no longer sell into the North American truck market. Reasons given for this decision was a combination of factors, including the continued shrinking of the cab-over-engine market segment and the accelerating cost of regulatory compliance.

In 2013, UD Trucks launched the UD Quester at Bangkok, a new heavy-duty truck for developing countries.

In 2014, UD Trucks merged with UD Trucks Japan. That same year, Volvo's Volvo Buses started to market UD buses in India. The first model for that market, the UD SLF, was introduced in 2015.

In 2015, UD Trucks renewed its headquarters building in Ageo.

In 2016, UD Trucks started selling the Kazet, a new light-duty for the Japanese market that is supplied by Mitsubishi Fuso. In December of that year, it sold its stake in Dongvo (previously Dongfeng Nissan Diesel), a joint venture with Dongfeng Motor Group, which was renamed as Dongfeng Nengdi.

In 2017, UD Trucks launched new versions of the Quon and Condor trucks. The Condor, a medium-duty truck, is supplied by Isuzu as part of an OEM agreement, mainly for the Japanese market. The company also launched a new Croner and the light-duty Kuzer, both aimed at developing countries.

In December 2019, Volvo signed a non-binding memorandum of understanding to form a strategic alliance with Isuzu. As part of the agreement, Volvo plans to eventually transfer UD Trucks to Isuzu. In October 2020, the sale agreement became binding.

In April 2021, Isuzu Motors became the owner of UD Trucks, completing the sale with Volvo.

== Leadership ==
- Yoshihiro Murakami (2015–2018)
- Takamitsu Sakamaki (2018–2022)
- Kouji Maruyama (2022–2025)
- Koichi Ito (April 2025–present)

== Markets ==
UD Trucks are marketed in over 60 countries. Some of the main markets are Japan, South Africa, Australia, Asia and the Middle East.

UD Trucks Southern Africa's head office and assembly plant is in Rosslyn, Gauteng and includes a competency development centre. There are 36 UD Trucks dealers and service agents in South Africa and another 30 in other southern African countries, including Angola, Malawi, Mozambique, Mauritius, Namibia, Zambia and Zimbabwe.

== Products ==
=== Trucks ===
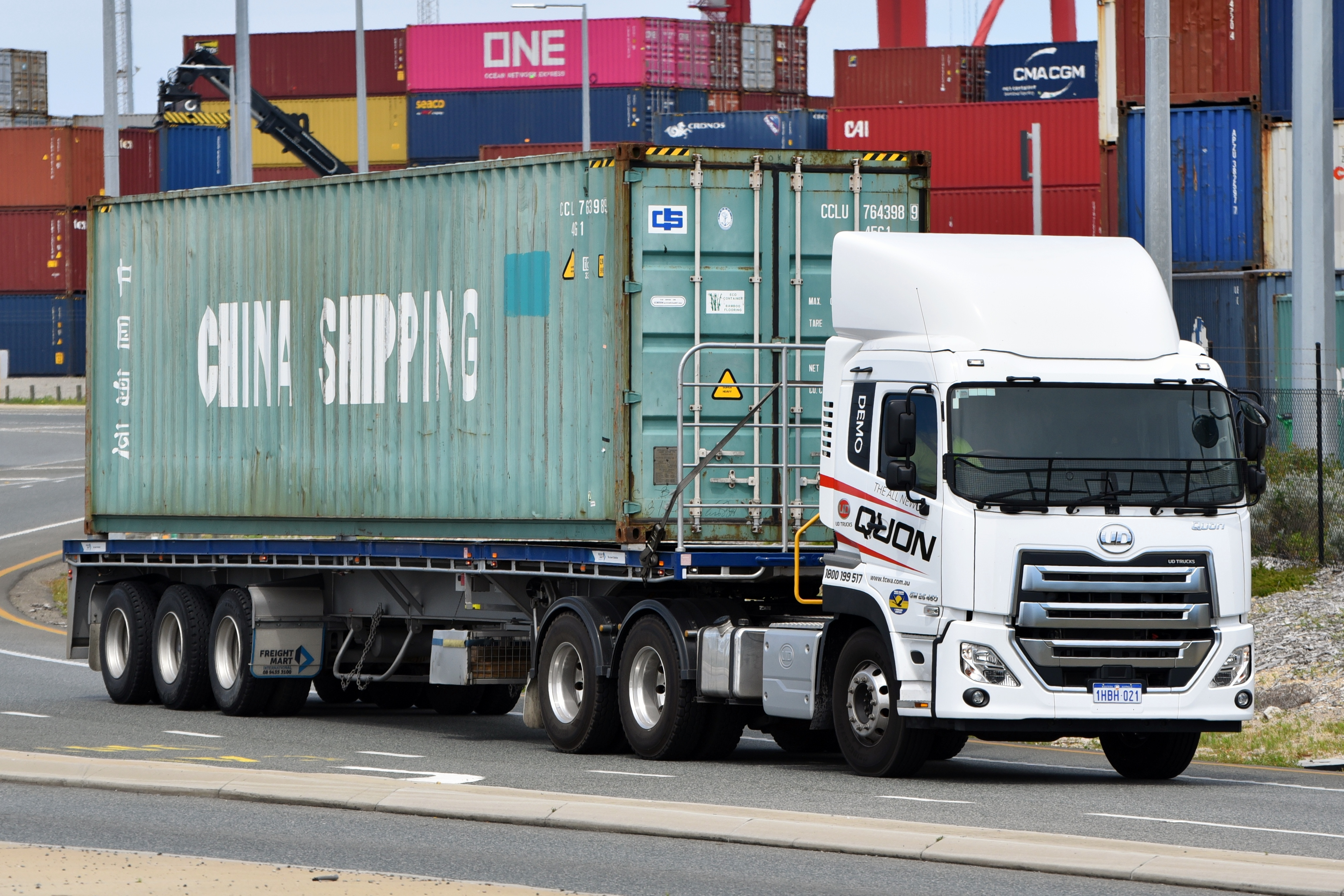
Quon

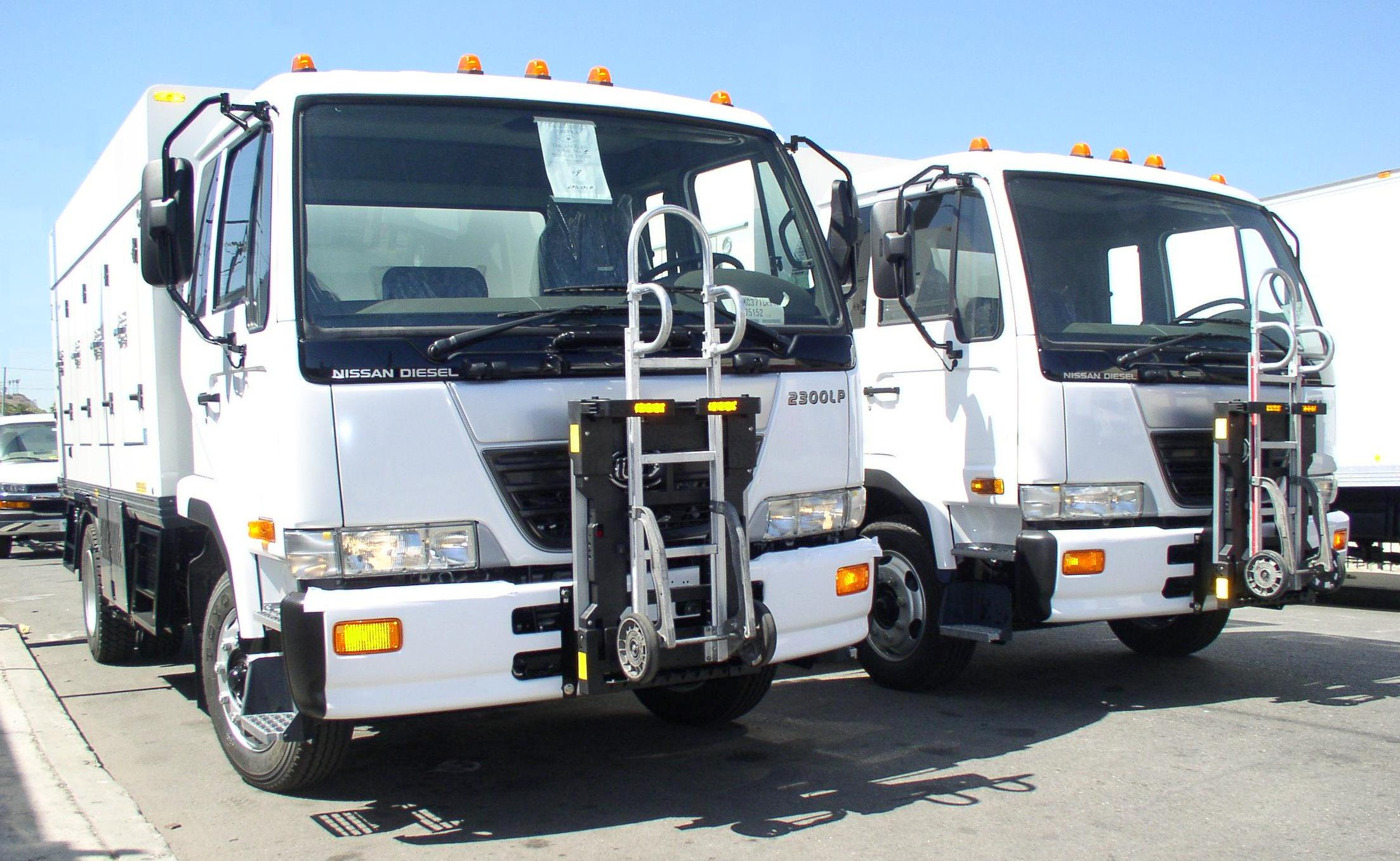
Condor

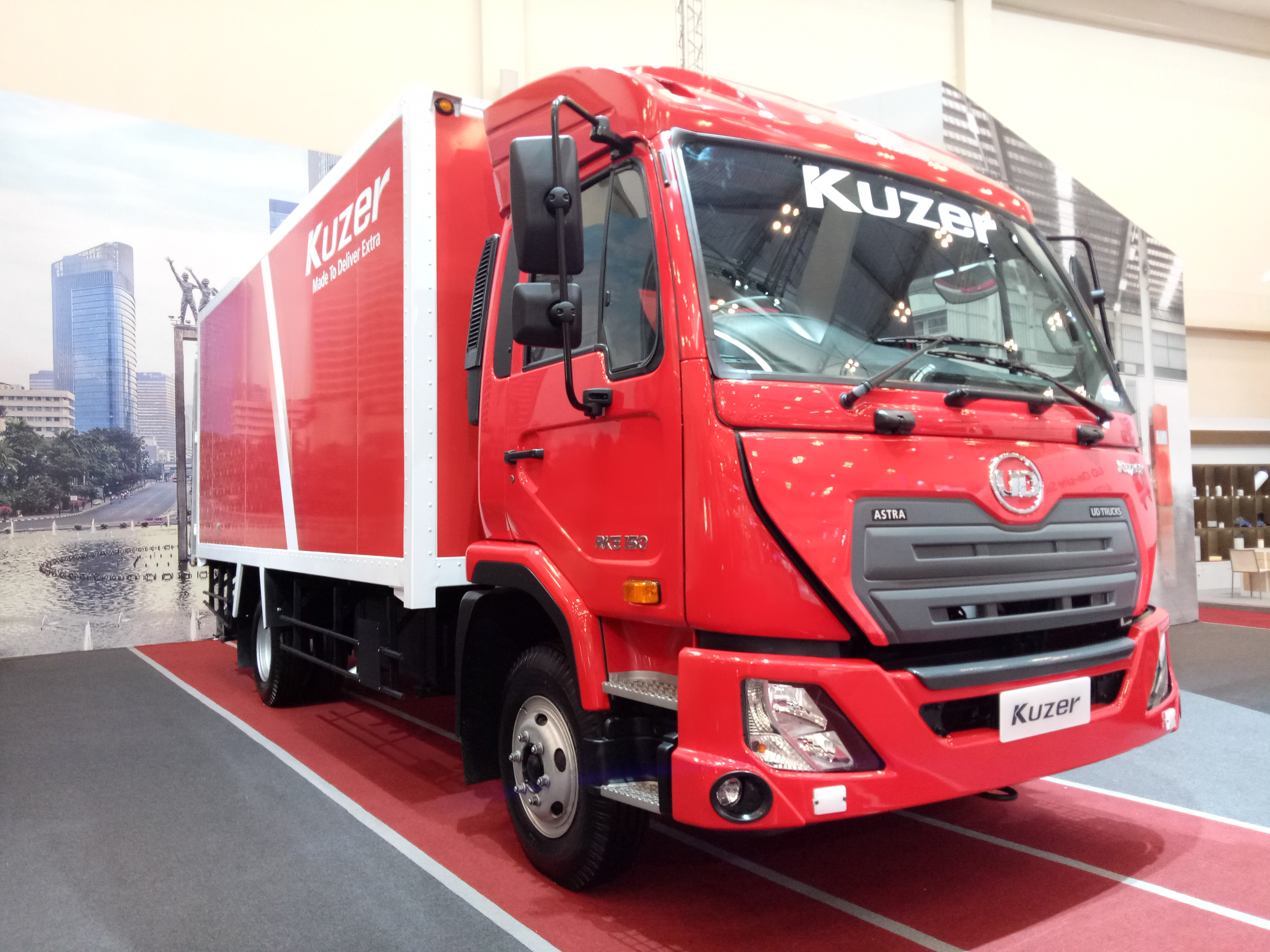
Kuzer

Quon- Heavy-duty truck - available with either a 8-litre or 11-litre engine in 4x2, 6x2, 6x4 or 8x4

- Condor-Medium-duty truck rebadged Isuzu Forward
- Kazet-Light-duty truck rebadged Isuzu Elf
- Quester-Heavy-duty truck for developing countries
- Croner-Medium-duty truck for developing countries
- Kuzer-Light-duty truck for developing countries

Former truck models:

- Big Thumb

=== Bus ===
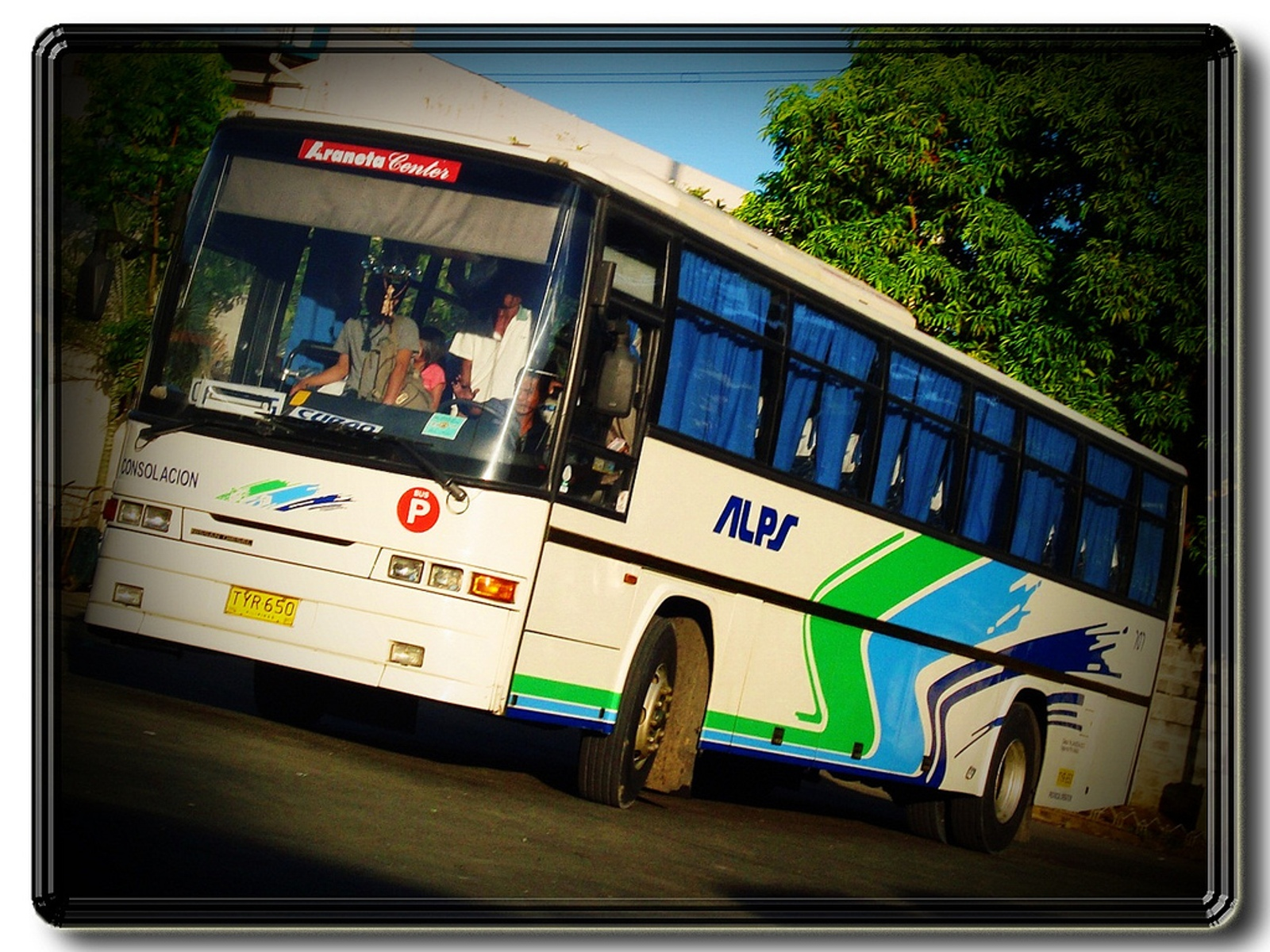
Nissan Diesel JA450SSN in Santarosa Euro bus body.

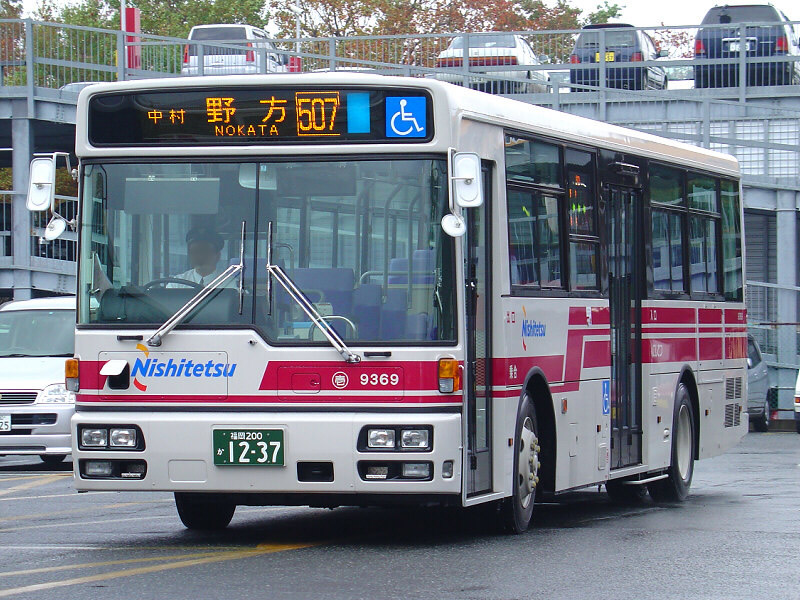
Space Runner RA

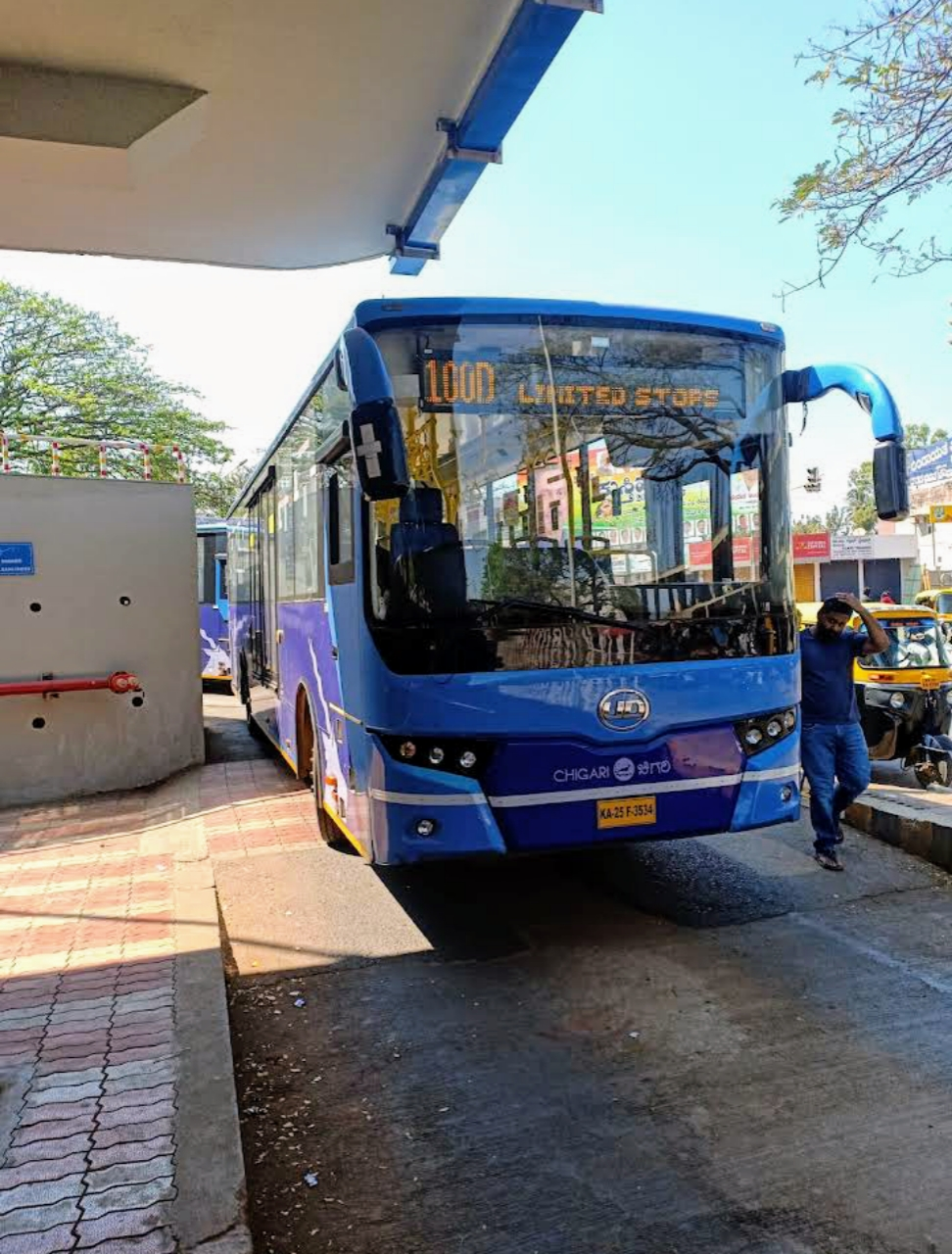
Chigari bus, Dharwad, India

UD Trucks ceased its Japanese bus production in 2011, but in 2014 launched a new series of UD Buses for the Indian market.

- SLF - Heavy Duty Bus
- BRT - Heavy Duty Bus
- Coach - Heavy Duty Coach

Former bus models:

- Space Arrow - Heavy Duty Bus
- Space Wing - Heavy Duty Bus
- Space Runner A -Heavy Duty Bus
- Space Runner RA -Heavy Duty Bus
- Space Runner RM -Medium Duty Bus
- Space Runner RP -Heavy Duty Bus
- Space Runner JP -Heavy Duty Bus
- UA - Heavy Duty Bus
- RN - Medium Duty Bus

Former Bus Models (Philippines)

Front Engine Bus

- CMF87L
- CPB87N
- LKA211N
- NU41B
- SP210P
- SP215NSB
- PKB212N

Rear Engine Bus

- RB31S/X
- RB46S/X
- RE10S
- JA430SAN
- JA450SSN
- JP251PSN
- JA520SAN

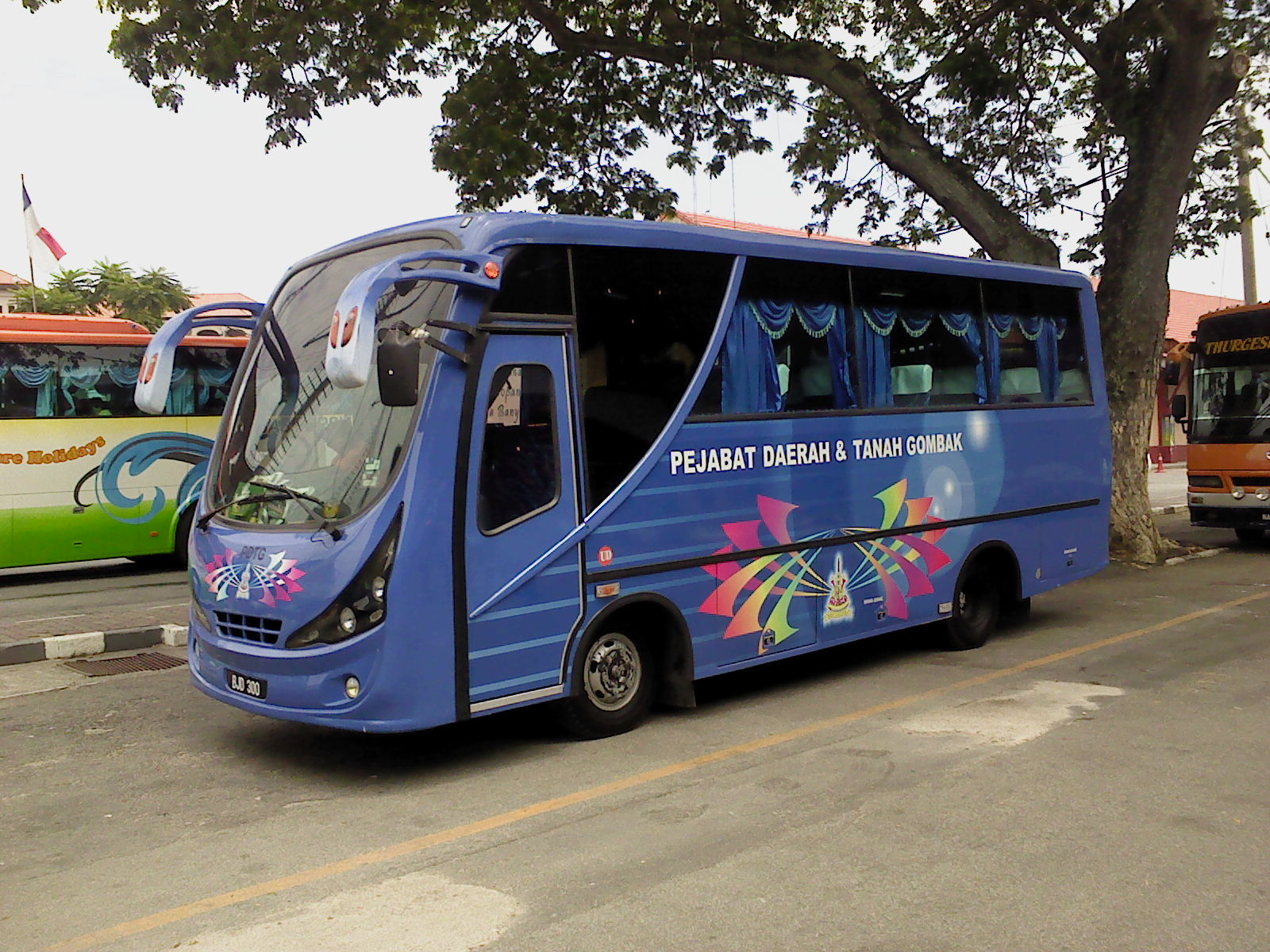
UD LKA211N

== Timeline of Ownership ==
=== Minsei Industries (1935–1950) ===
Underwent various namechanges:

- Nihon Diesel Industries Ltd. in 1935
- Kanega-Fuchi Diesel Co Ltd. in 1942
- Minsei Industries Ltd. in 1946

=== Minsei Diesel Industries Ltd. (1950–1959) ===
Divested from Minsei Industries Ltd.

=== Nissan Diesel Motor Co Ltd. (Nissan; 1960–2007) ===
Minsei Diesel Industries acquired by Nissan Motor Company and subsequently renamed.

=== Nissan Diesel (Volvo; 2007–2021) ===
Nissan Diesel Motor Co. acquired by Volvo Group.

- Supply agreement with Fuso in 2007
- Name change to UD Trucks in 2010

=== UD Trucks (Isuzu; 2021–present) ===
UD Trucks acquired by Isuzu Motors.
