= UD Condor =

Medium-duty commercial vehicle

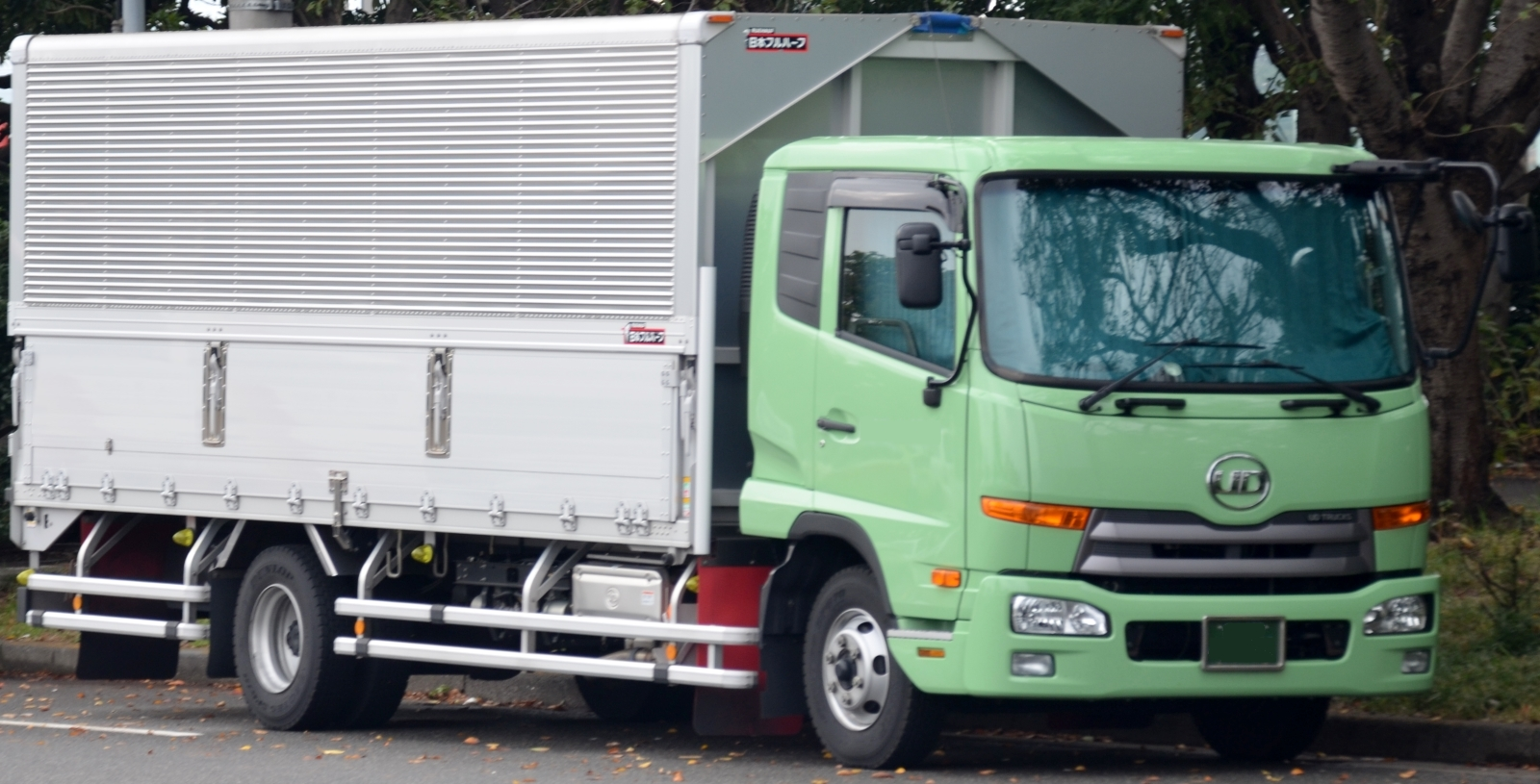
- Fourth generation UD Condor

Overview
- Manufacturer: Nissan Diesel (1975–2010); Hino (1994–2011); UD Trucks (2011–2017); Isuzu (2017–present)
- Also called: Ford MK/LK/PW (AUS); International 400-900 series; Isuzu Forward (2017–present); Hino Ranger (1994–2011); Nissan Diesel CK87 (IDN)
- Production: 1975–present

Body and chassis
- Class: Truck
- Body style: Truck (standard cab); Crew cab truck
- Related: UD Quester; UD Croner; Isuzu Forward; Hino Ranger; Dongfeng EQ153

Powertrain
- Engine: NE6, NE6T, FE6T, FE6TA, FE6TC, FD6T, ED6, J08E, D16K, D12C, 4HK1, 6NX1, GH7, JO8C EH700, HO7D, EH500, EH300,
- Transmission: Nissan (manual), Aisin (automatic)

The UD Condor (kana:UD・コンドル) is a line of cabover medium-duty or heavy-duty commercial vehicles produced by Nissan Diesel introduced in 1975, Compact models sold under the Nissan Diesel Condor brand and rebranded Nissan Atlas.

Most mid-size and larger models of the truck are distinguishable by a front 'Condor' badge, but the common Nissan Diesel or UD badge is usually used on the rear.

In the United States, it is sold as a UD followed by a four-digit numeral indicating its load capacity, Its principal competitors are the Bering MD, Mitsubishi Fuso FM, Chevrolet W-Series, GMC W-Series, Ford cargo, Volvo fl, daf xb, and Isuzu F-Series. Its Japanese market competitors are the Mitsubishi Fuso Fighter, Isuzu Forward, and Hino Ranger. In 2011 a new generation Condor MK/LK was introduced, which used the UD name in all markets, rather than Nissan Diesel.

== First generation (1975–1983) ==
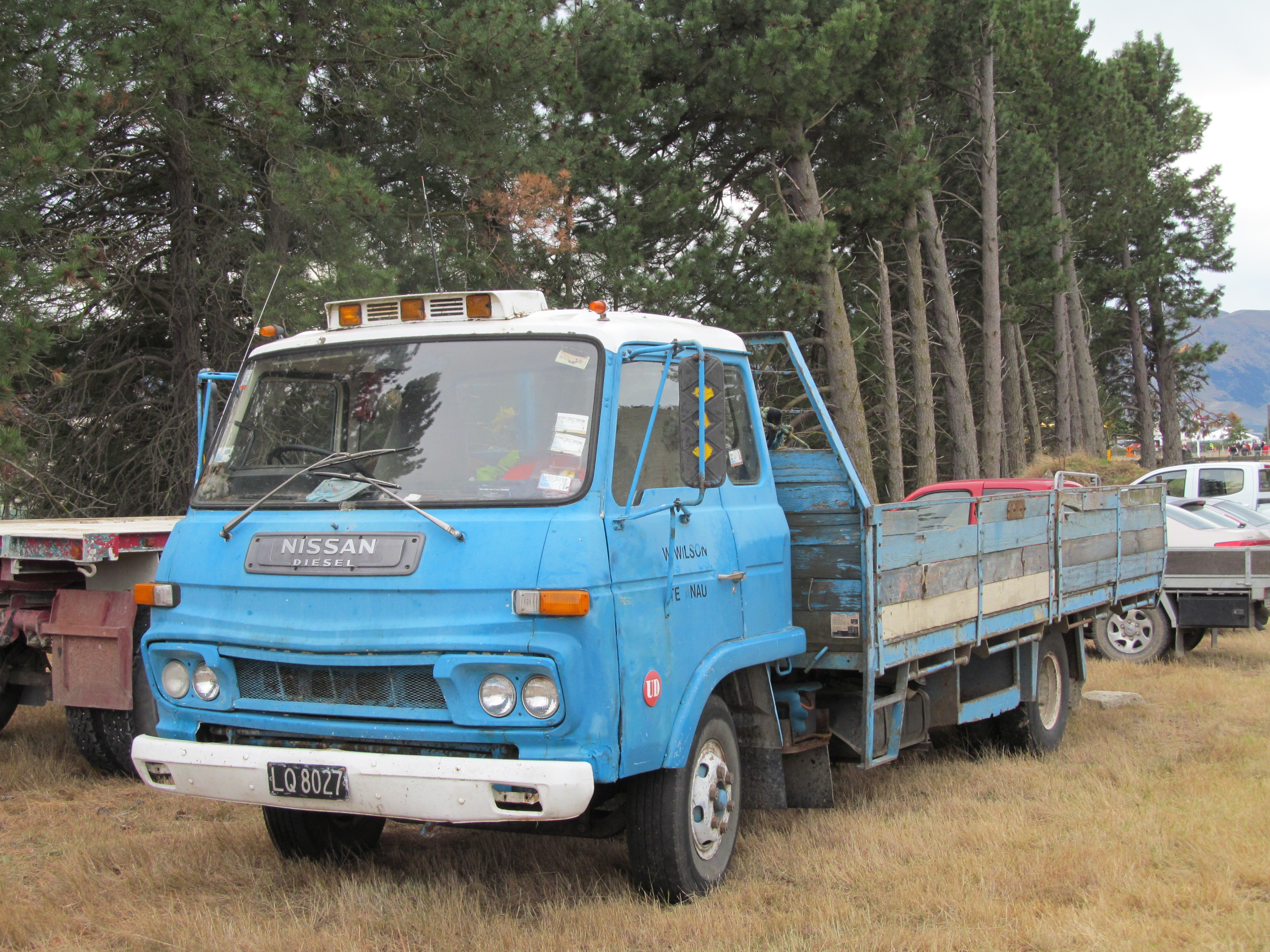
First Generation CM80 (1975 model)

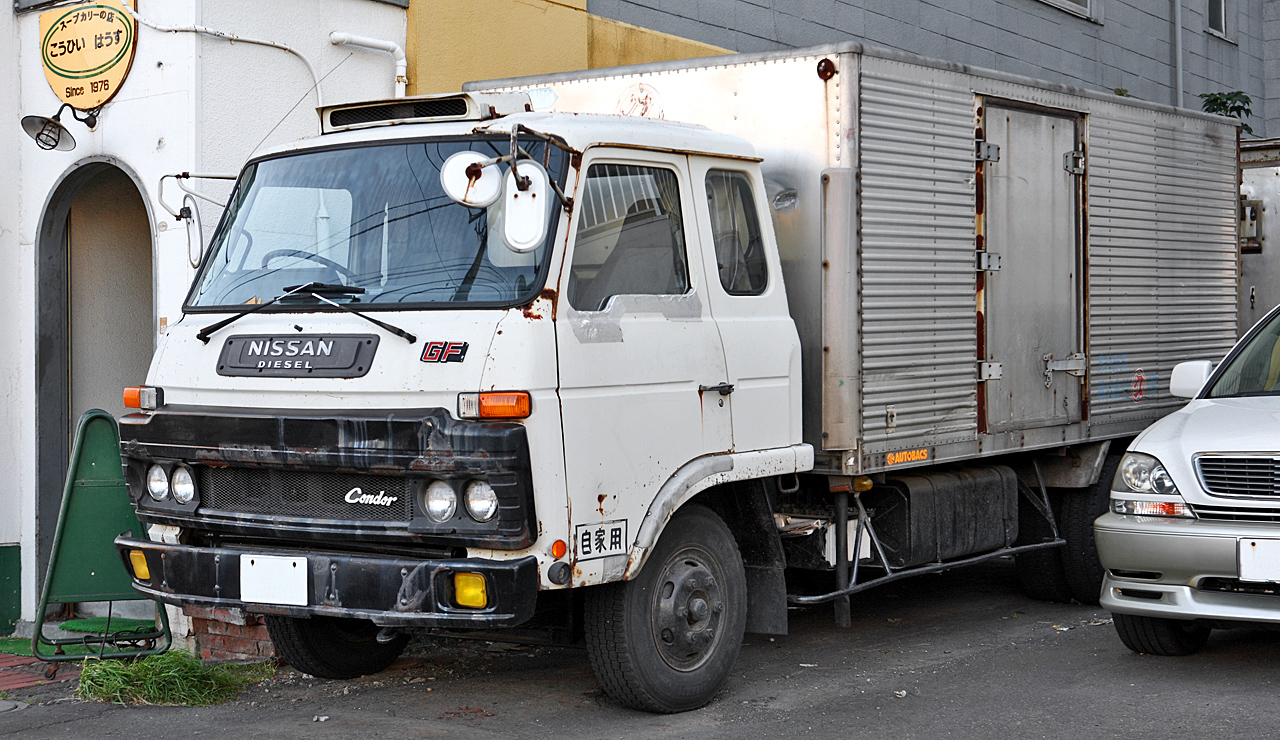
First Generation Condor GF (1979 model)

The first Condor appeared in 1975. Two types of engine were available: ED6 (a swirl chamber) and FD6T (a direct injection, with turbo). The turbo model is referred to as the "Condor GF"; it is equipped with power steering standard. In 1979 the base engine changed from ED6 to FD6 due to emissions regulations; the cab design was also revised.

== Second generation (1983–1993) ==
The second generation Condor launched in 1983 following emissions compliance. In 1988, minor changes were made to the grille, the Condor S was added, and in 1989 anti-lock brakes were added.

Engine options available were the 6.9 Liter FE6 Engine offered in turbo and non turbo variants with power ranges from 160–230 PS (158–227 hp).

In the United States, this generation was sold as the UD 1800-3300 but it was also imported by Navistar International and sold as the International Model 400, 500, 600, 700, and 900. The smallest Model 400 was a Class 5 truck with a 17,640 lb (8,000 kg) GVW and Nissan Diesel engines of 160 or 180 hp (119 or 134 kW). The heaviest Model 900, a Class 7 truck, corresponds to the UD 3300.

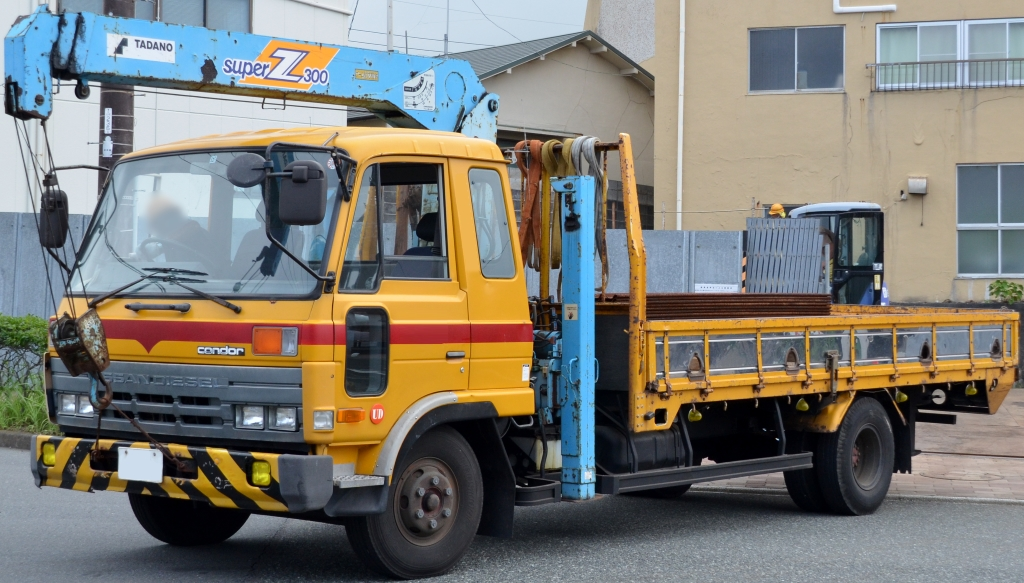
UD Condor CM Cargo Crane truck

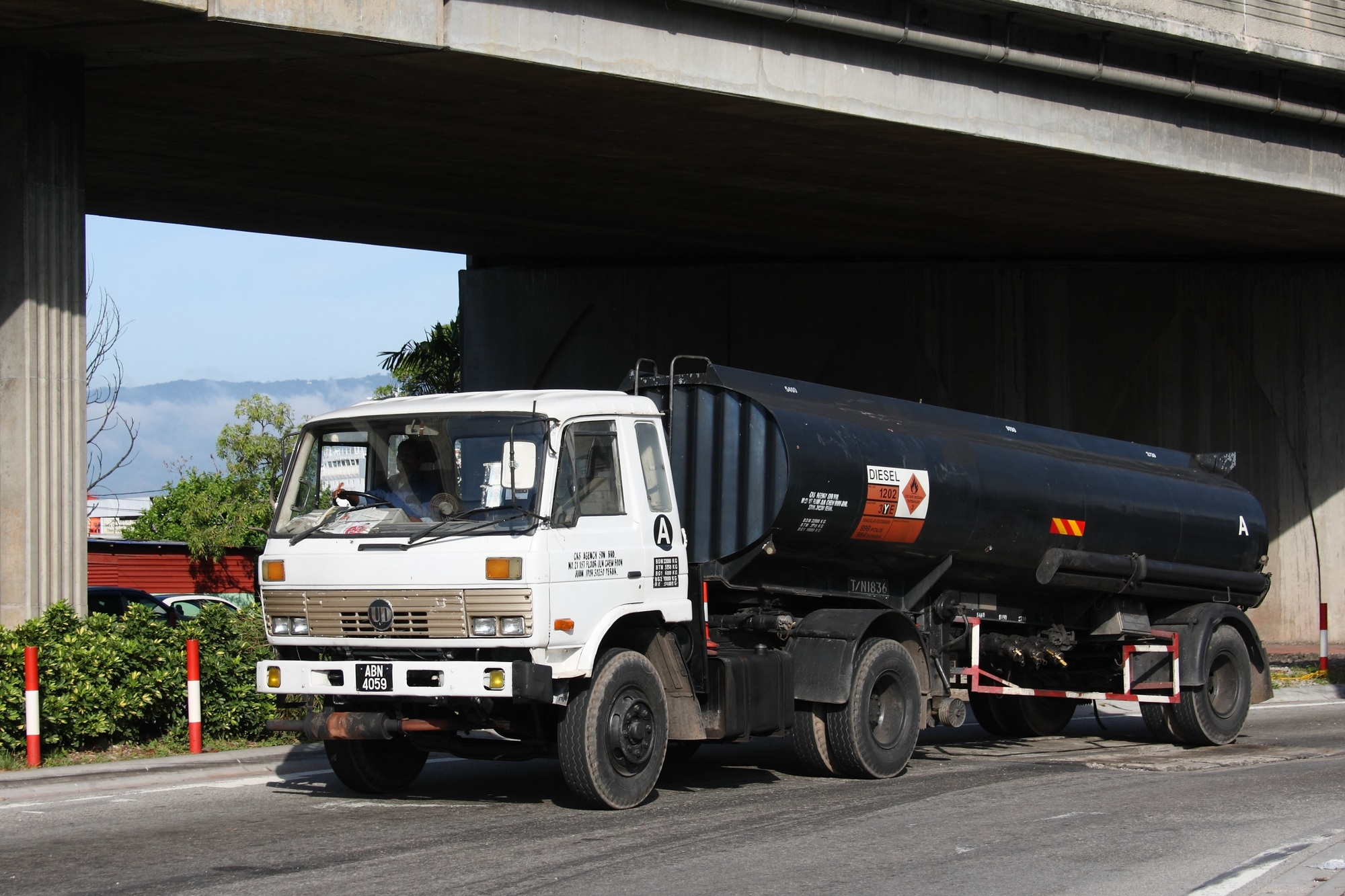
Second generation Nissan Diesel Condor in Malaysia

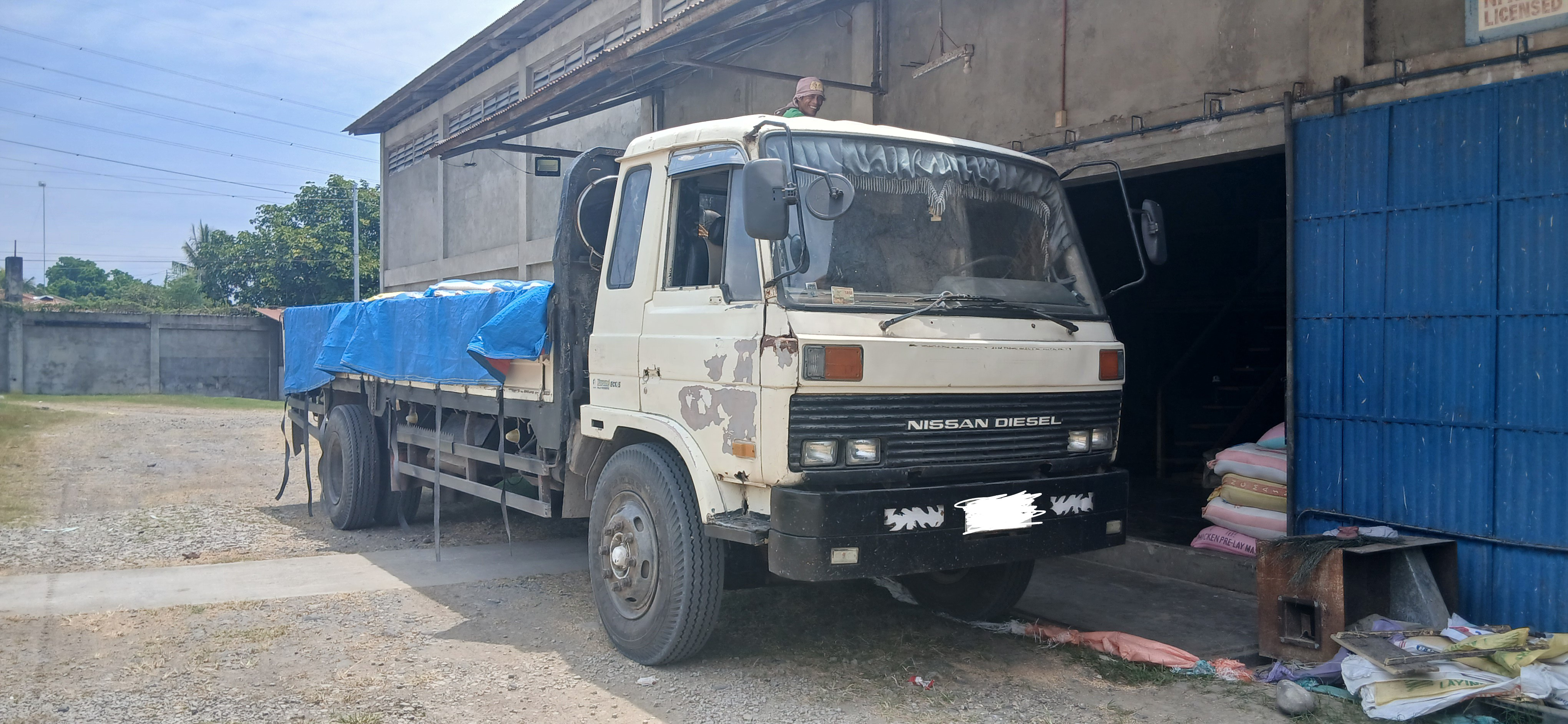
Nissan Diesel Condor used for transportation of rice grains in the Philippines

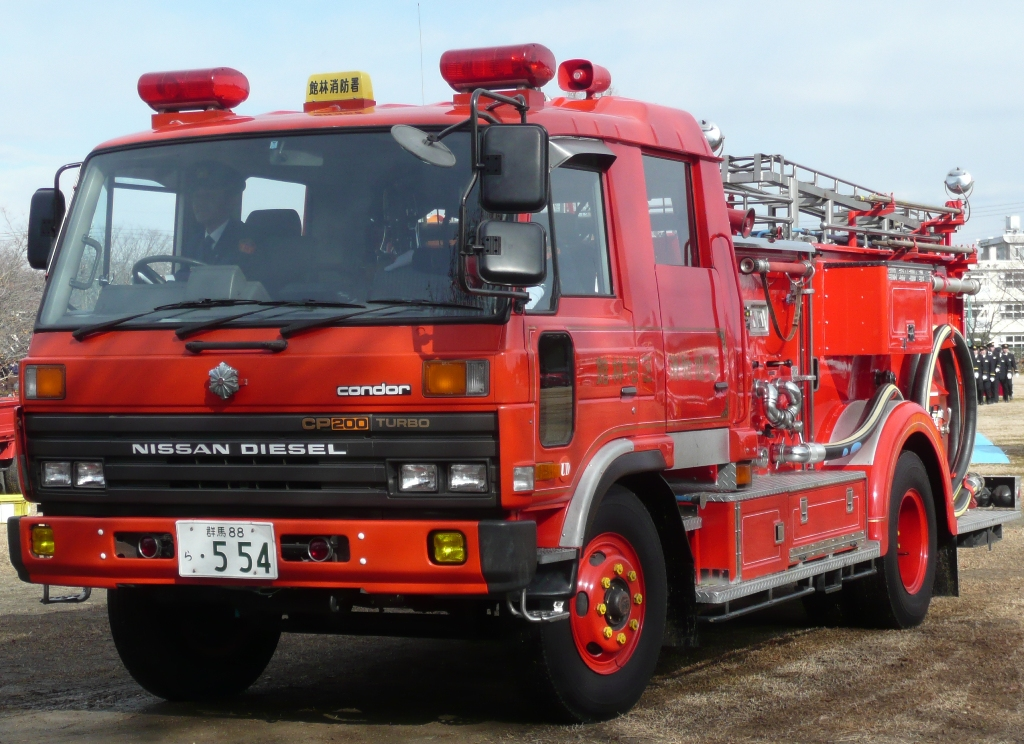
Nissan Diesel Condor CP200

== Third generation (1993–2011) ==
In 1993, the third generation of the Condor range was introduced as the Fine Condor, and in 1994 it added a 4WD package. Minor changes included exhaust emission regulations in 1994 and in 1995 the Condor SS ultra-lightweight specifications was added. In addition, the CNG vehicles on its Condor range, and soon after, in 1997 it added PW (with 10 tons) and a short cab Condor Z, does similar to Condor S is out of print and accordingly. Also the same year, it adopted shock-absorbing steering. Low-floor 4WD was also added.

In January 2000, an Allison 5-speed automatic transmission became available. The 9- and 12-ton versions were replaced in 2010, with the other models continuing to be built for another year.

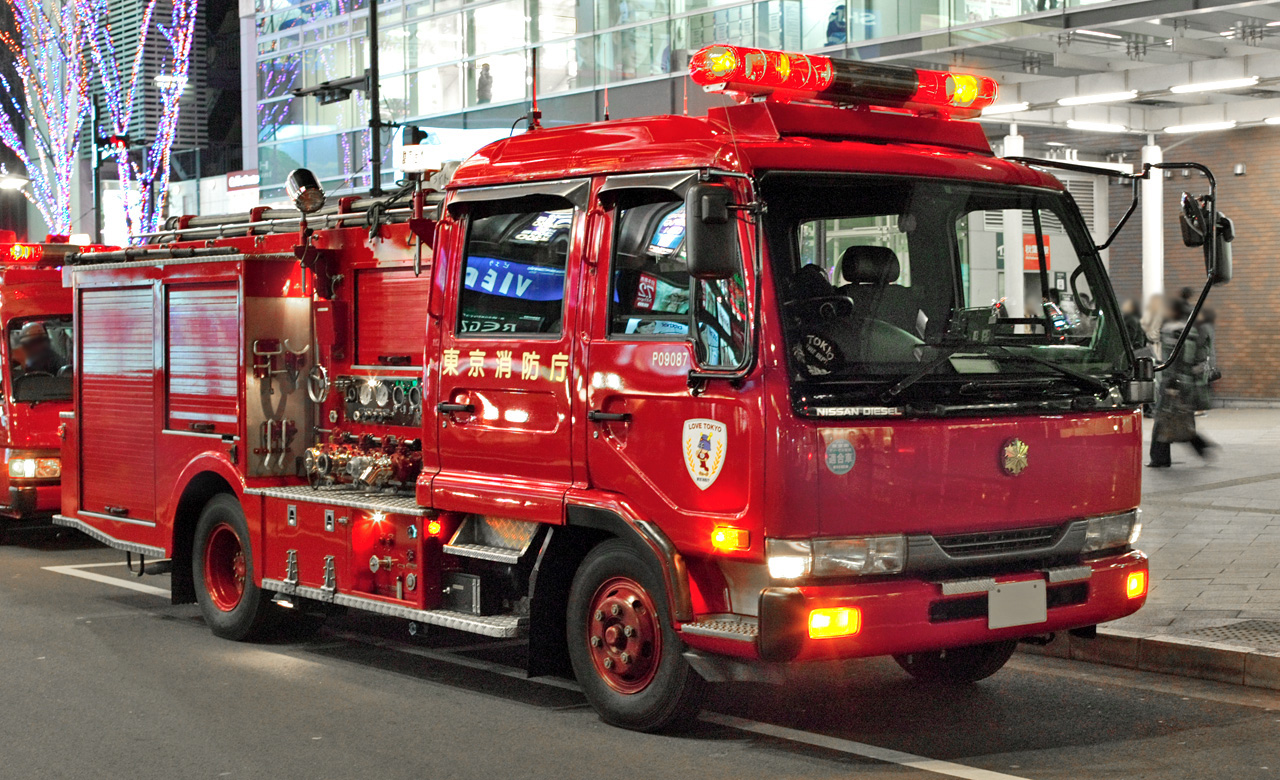
UD Condor fire engine (1993 Facelift)

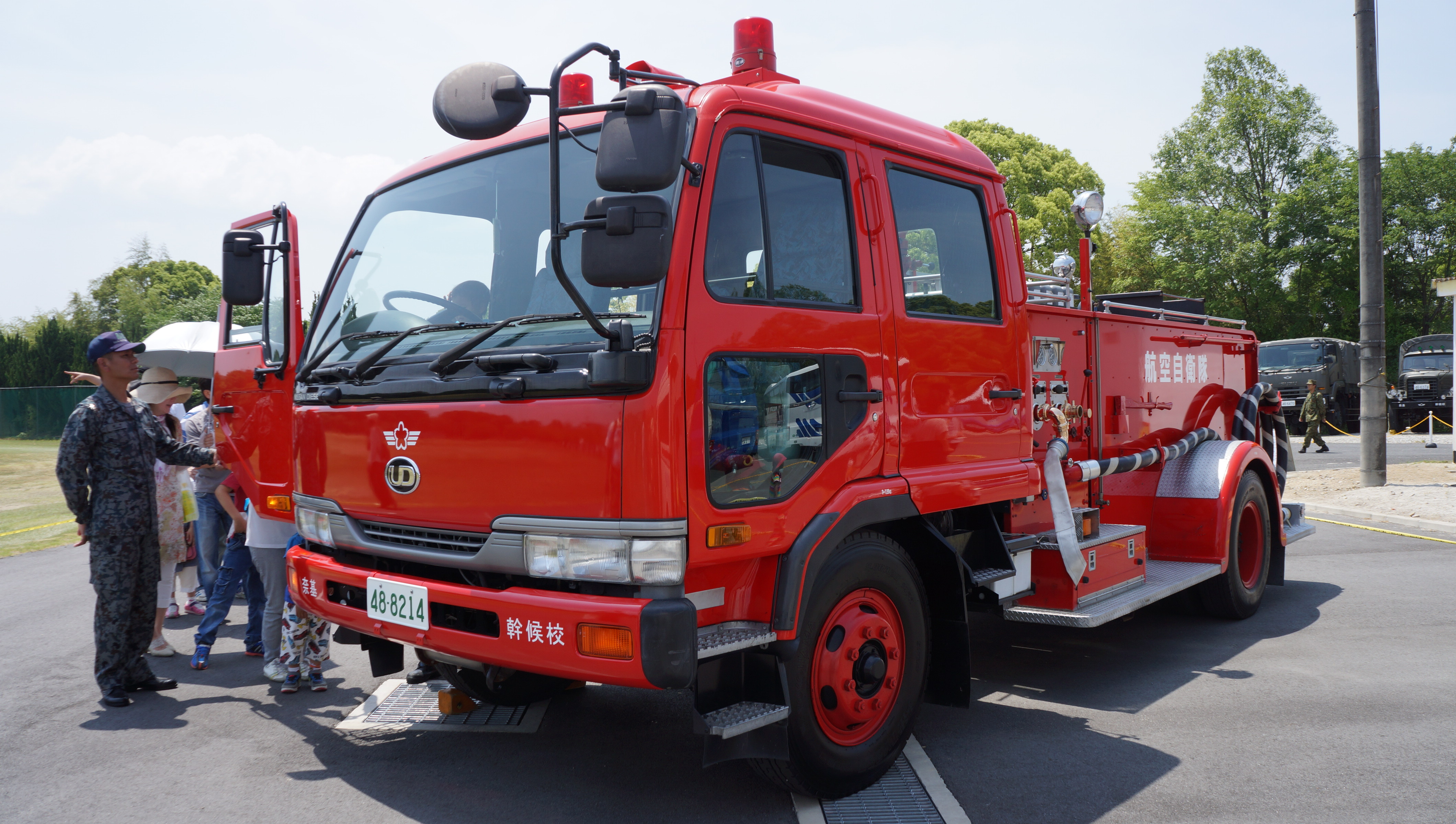
UD Condor Fire Apparatus (1997 Facelift)

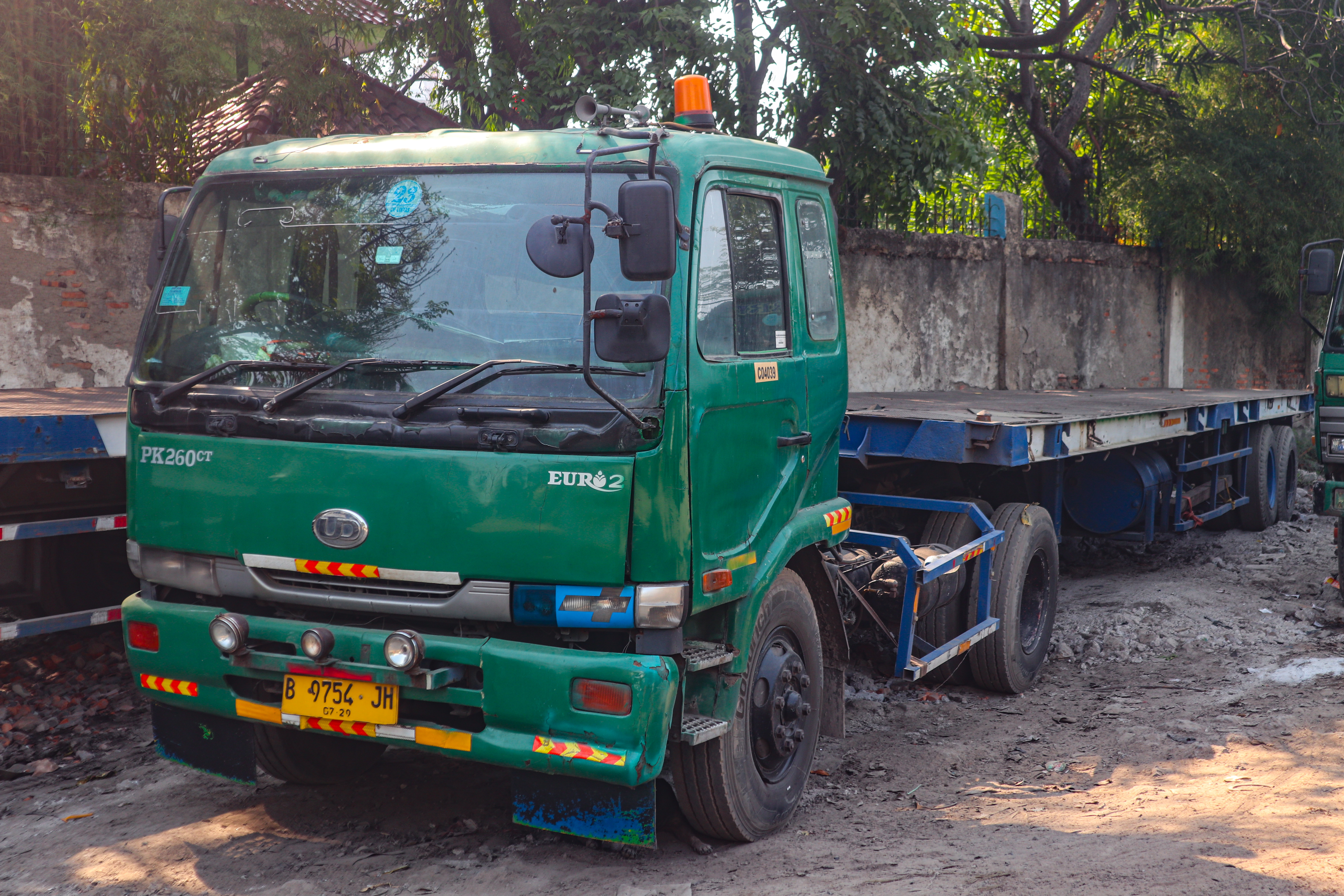
UD Condor Semi-Truck Tractor connected to an Flatbed Trailer

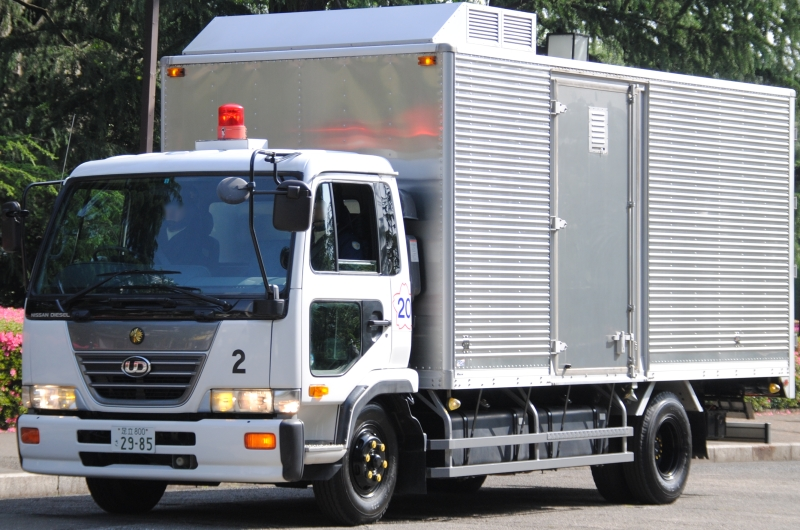
UD Condor MK Closed Van (1999 Facelift)

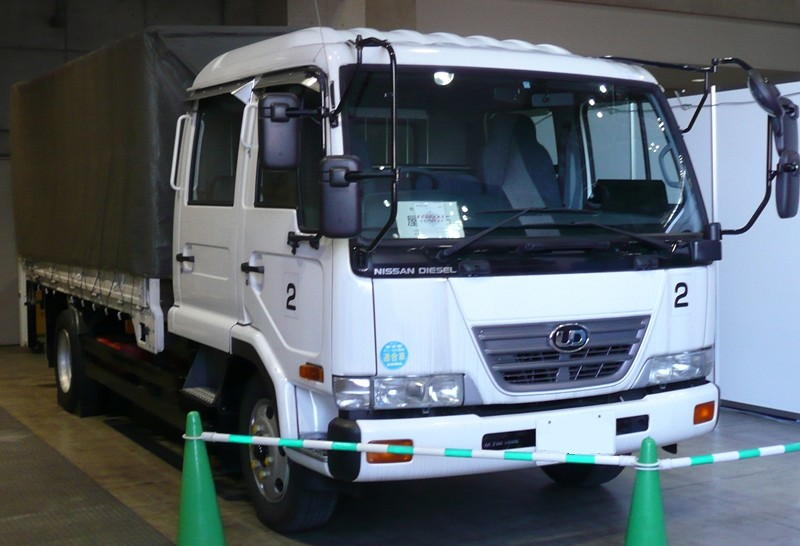
UD Condor LK Double Cab with cargo dropside (2002 facelift)

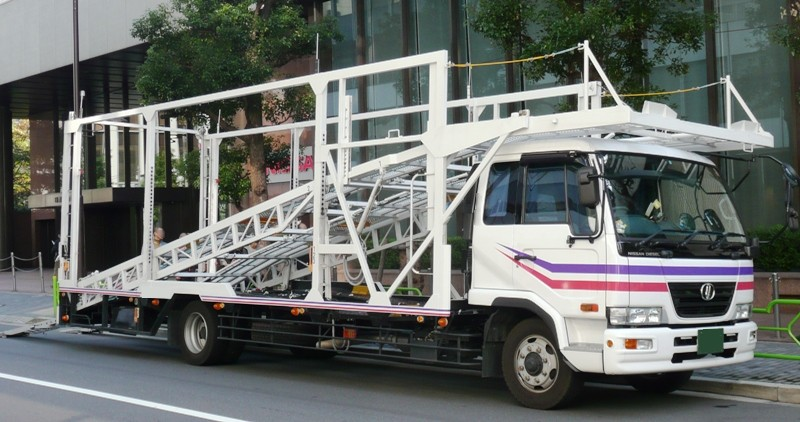
UD Condor PK Car Carrier (2004 facelift)

== Fourth generation (2010–2017) ==
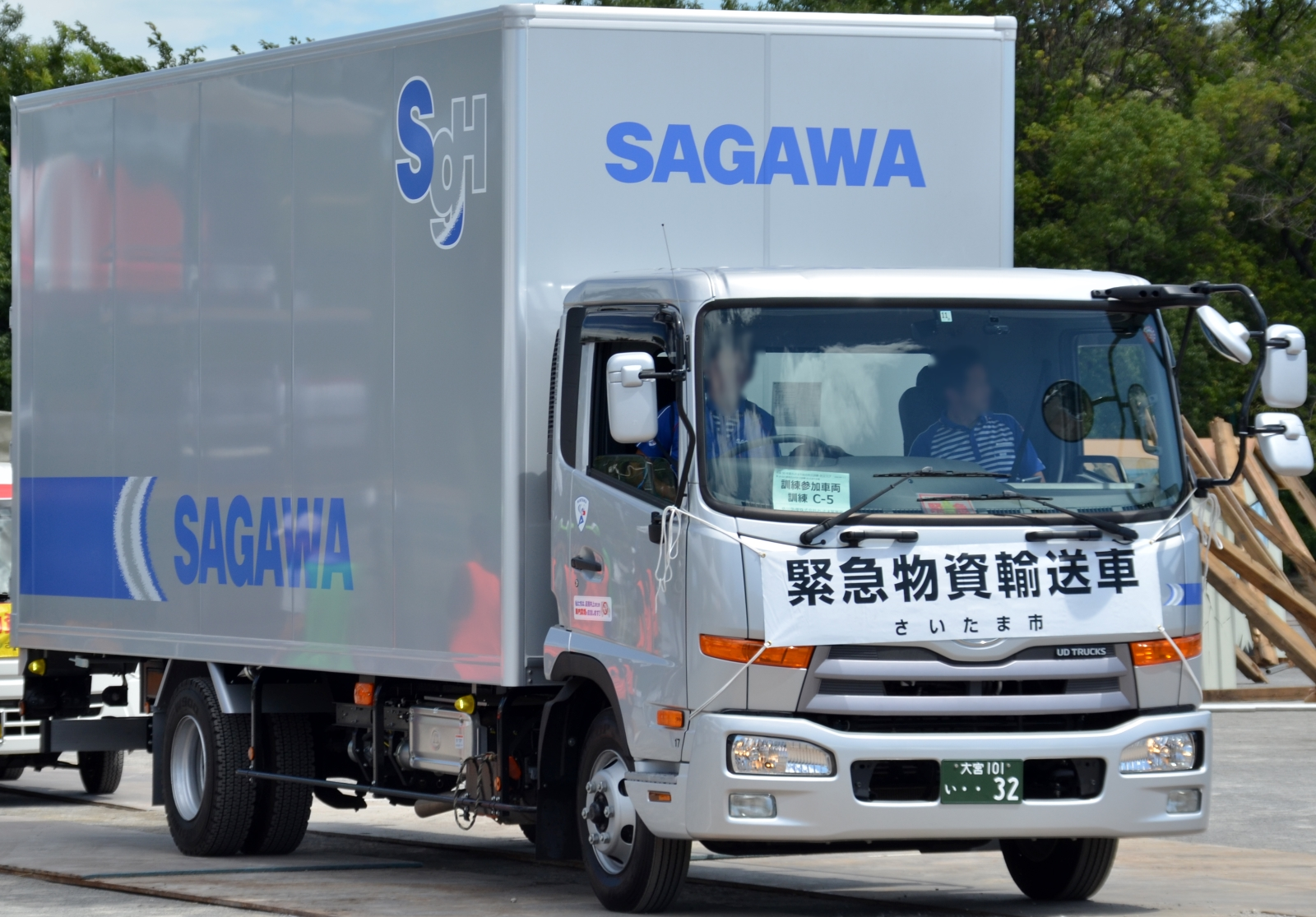
Sagawa Express UD Condor Delivery truck

In April 2010 the 8 ton class model PK series was announced, following the name change to UD Trucks in February 2010. It was introduced in Japan, with plans to sell in the US and other markets.

Engine options are the 4.6 L GH5 and the 7.0 L GH7

On 23 August 2010, the 9-ton PK series and 12-ton PW series were introduced while other models continued within the third generation.

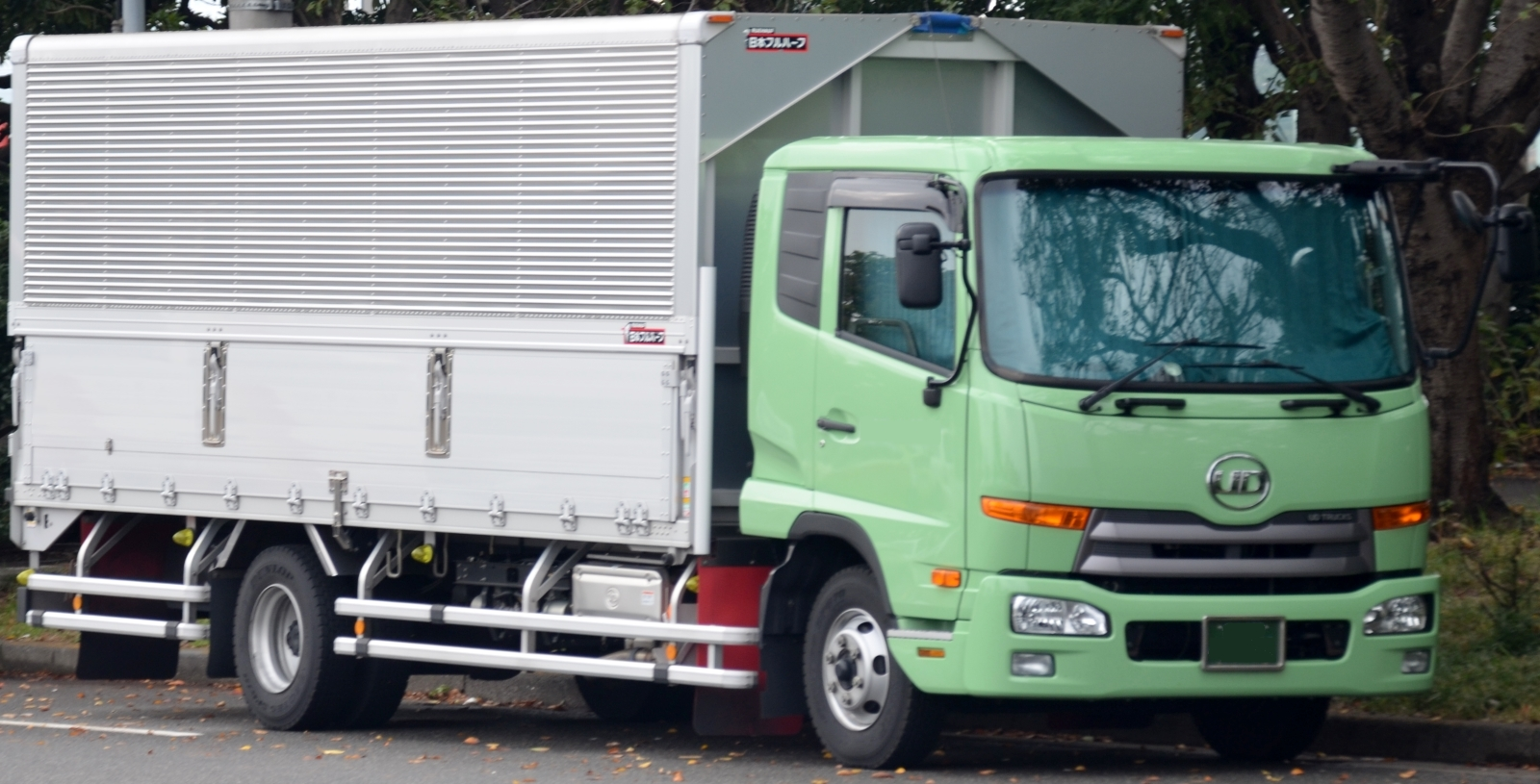
UD Condor MK

== Fifth generation (2017–2024) ==
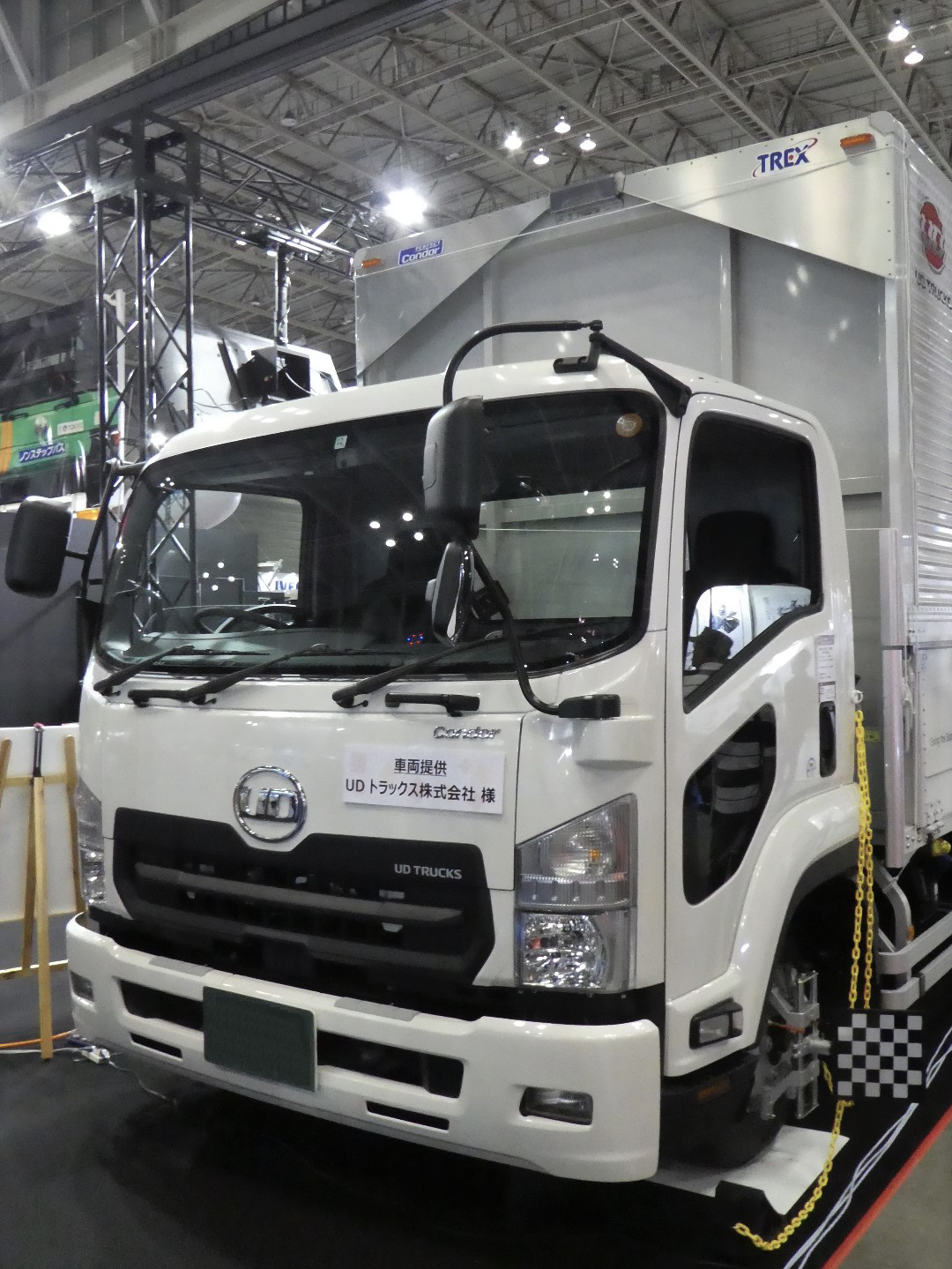
The fifth generation Condor is a rebadged Isuzu Forward.

On 28 July 2017, as part of its transition from UD Trucks to Isuzu, the fifth generation Condor was introduced. It is now a rebadged version of the Isuzu Forward, with unique front fascia and new cab.

== Sixth generation (2024–Present) ==
The sixth generation UD Condor was announced to the press on January 24, 2024. The fully redesigned UD Condor went on sale days later. It remains a rebadge of the Isuzu Forward which was updated simultaneously.

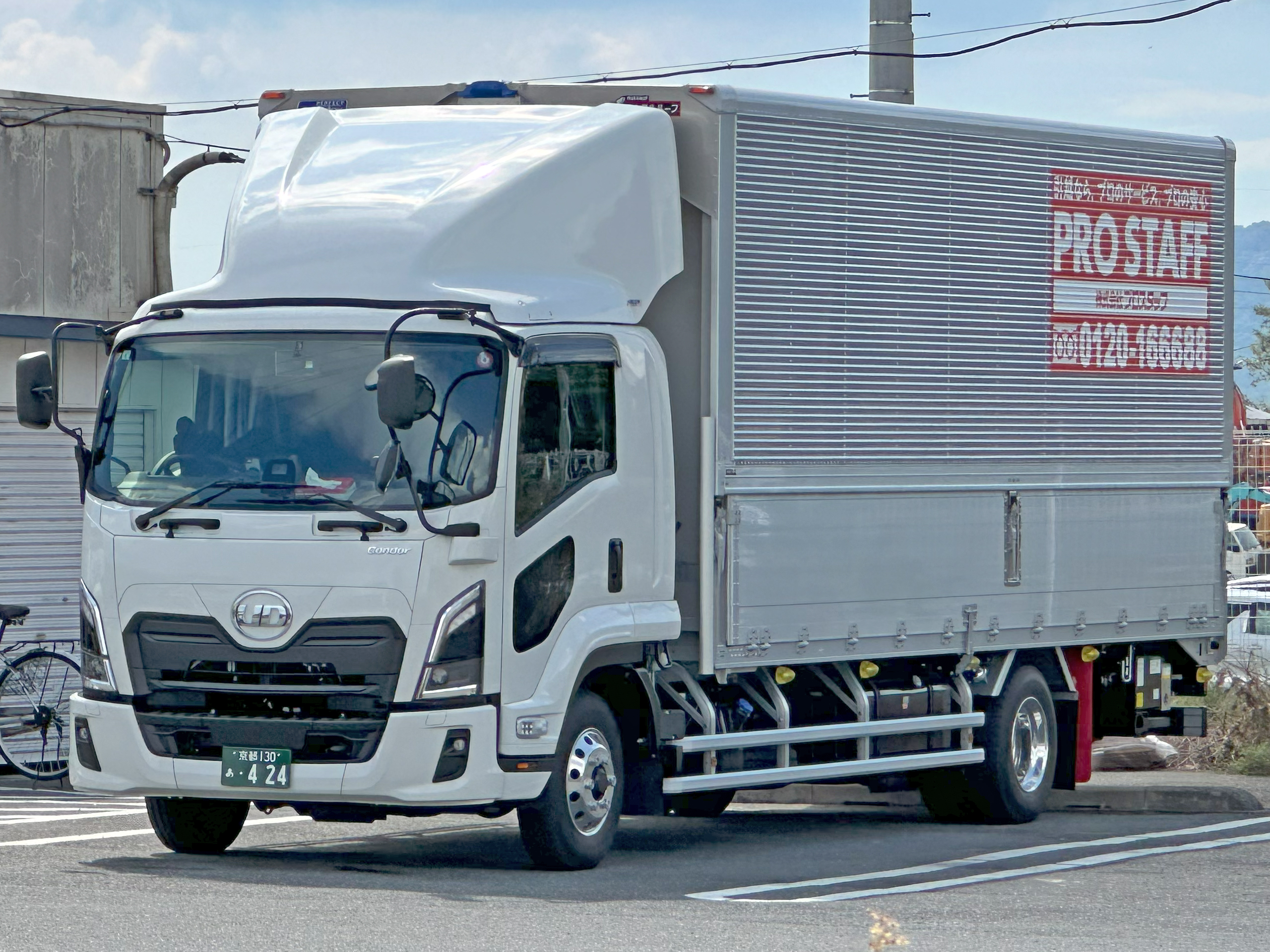
The sixth generation Condor is a rebadged Isuzu Forward

== Lineup ==
=== Japan ===
- CM
- MK215 hh
- LK
- PK
- PW
- CPB87N
- CMF87L
- SP215NSB

=== US & Canada ===
- UD 1300
- UD 1400
- UD 1800
- UD 2000
- UD 2300, DH, LP
- UD 2600
- UD 2800
- UD 3000
- UD 3300
