= List of hybrid vehicles =

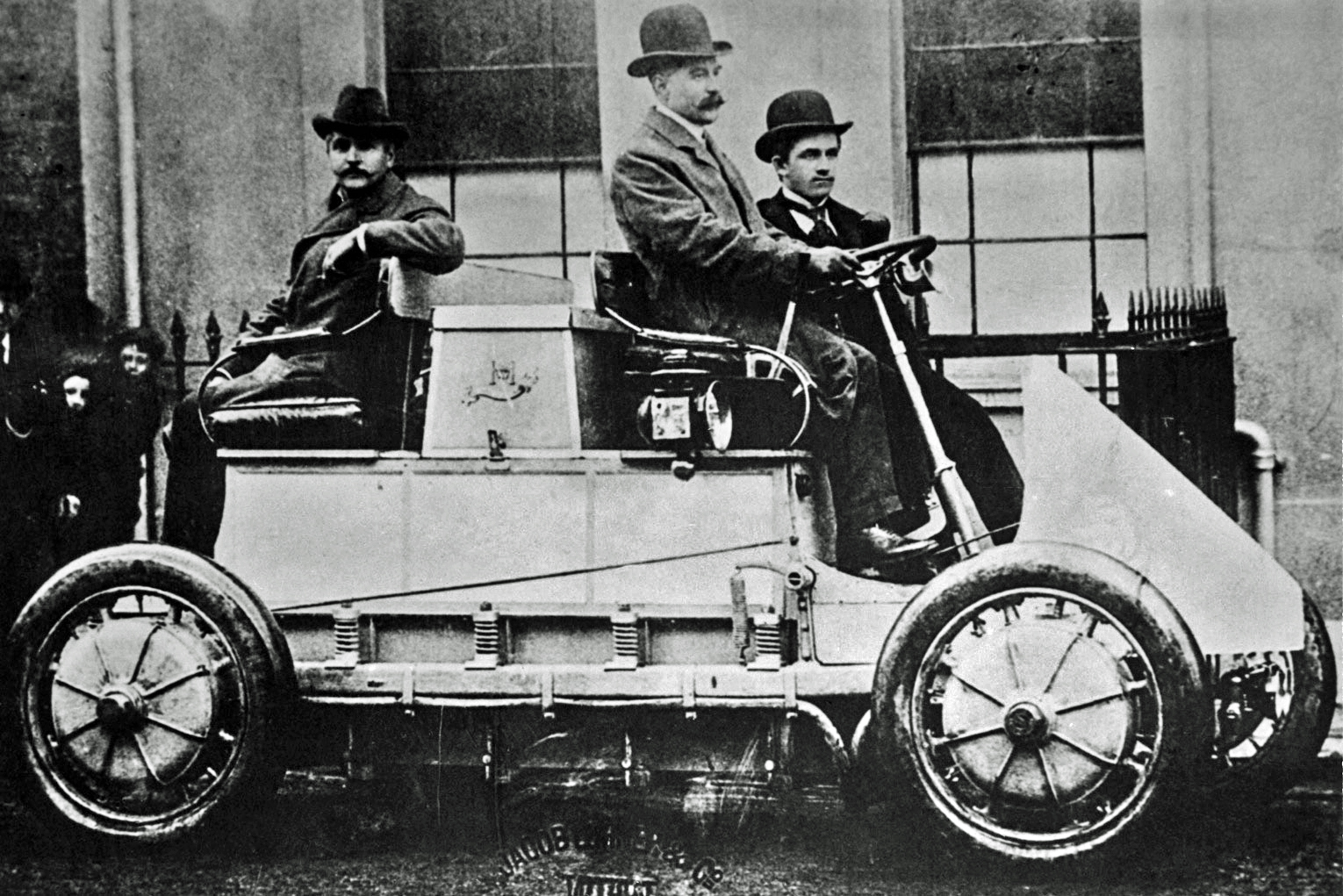
The Lohner–Porsche Mixte Hybrid was the first gasoline–electric hybrid automobile.

This is a list of hybrid vehicles. A hybrid could theoretically have any two power sources, but hybrid vehicles have typically combined an internal combustion engine with a battery and electric motor(s).

This list includes both regular hybrid electric vehicles and plug-in hybrids, in chronological order of first production. Since Porsche made the first hybrid car in 1899 there have been a number of hybrid vehicles; but there was a marked increase in interest in, and development of, hybrid vehicles for personal transport in the late 1990s.

== Automobiles ==
=== Overview by decade ===
Year	Company	Name	Type	Comments	MPG
Pre-1950
1899	Jacob Lohner & Co.		Automobile		
1900	Pieper of Belgium		Automobile		
1901	Jacob Lohner & Co.	Lohner–Porsche	Automobile		
1905	Fischer Motor Vehicle Co.	Petrol–electric Omnibus	Bus		
1906	Auto-Mixte		Automobile	Pieper patent	
1907	AL (French car)		Automobile		
1911	Tilling-Stevens	TTA1 petrol–electric (in service on Thomas Tilling routes)	Bus	Petrol–electric transmission, but no storage battery and no propulsion except with the petrol engine running	
1915	Owen Magnetic	Touring Car	Automobile	The 'Car of a Thousand Speeds'	
1915	Woods Motor Vehicle	Dual Power Model 44	Automobile		
1950s
1951	Compagnie Normande d'Etudes	Arbel	Automobile	A petrol–electric hybrid powered on the Lohner–Porsche principle. Very few made and most were prototypes. A nuclear power plant was proposed for the 1958 version.	
1960s
1969	Mercedes-Benz	Mercedes-Benz OE 302	Bus		
1969	General Motors	General Motors XP-883	Automobile		
1970s
1970	Lviv Bus Factory	LAZ 360EM	Bus	First and last low floor Soviet city bus with hybrid transmission, this bus was built as a concept bus, and only one example was made.	
1972		Towns Microdot	Automobile		
1979	Fiat	Fiat 131 Ibrida	Automobile	Fiat hybrid prototype, 903 cc engine mated to a 24 kW (33 PS; 32 hp) DC	
1980s
1980	Daihatsu Motor Co.	Daihatsu Charmant Hybrid	Automobile	This four-door, four-seater car was part of a series of EV prototypes constructed by Daihatsu in the seventies and eighties. It used a 550 cc two-cylinder engine which charged the batteries, and was augmented by two DC electric motors during acceleration.	
1986		Twike	Automobile	The Twike HEHV designed by a group of Swiss students debuted at the 1986 World expo in Vancouver, British Columbia, Canada. It remains in limited production and available in the United States (source: Neiman Marcus Christmas Book 2007, page 89).	
1986	Honda	Gaselle	Automobile	The Goldwing engine-based Gaselle hybrid gas/electric prototype built by Sarabjit Gandhi drove 8050 km in 16 days as part of the World Energy Autocross.	
1988	Alfa Romeo	33 Ibrida	Automobile		
1990s
1991	Hino	Hino Blue Ribbon HIMR	Bus		
1992	Volvo Cars	Volvo ECC	Automobile	Gas turbine–electric	
1993	Mitsubishi	Mitsubishi Fuso Aero Star MBECS, first generation	Bus		
1993	Hino	Model unknown, medium duty, for sale in Japan only. First generation.	Truck		
1995	Fiat	Vanzic	Automobile	Electric motor with the assistance of a thermal energy generator	
1995	Nissan	Nissan Diesel UA ERIP	Bus		
1996	Isuzu	Isuzu Cubic CHASSE	Bus		
1996	Gillig Corporation	Gillig Phantom Hybrid	Bus		
1997	Audi	Audi A4 Avant Duo	Automobile	First production Audi Hybrid, third generation of the "Duo" hybrid powertrain, PHEV	
1997	Toyota	Toyota Coaster Hybrid EV	Bus	First Japanese series hybrid bus	
1997	Toyota	Toyota Prius (Japanese market only)	Automobile		
1998	New Flyer Industries	New Flyer DE40LF (diesel–electric hybrid bus), originally called "H40LF"	Bus		
1999	Honda	Honda Insight	Automobile		
1999	Orion International	Orion VI Hybrid	Bus		
2000s
2000	Nissan	Tino Hybrid	Automobile	1.769L QG18DE 74 kW petrol engine and EM29 17 kW electric motor	
2000	Fiat	Multipla Hybrid Power	Automobile	Thermal engine and electric motor	
2000	Toyota	Toyota Prius (introduced to US market)	Automobile	1NZ-FXE 4cyl engine, 2001–2003 model	
2001	Toyota	Toyota Crown (Japan only)	Automobile	Mild hybrid	
2001	Toyota	Toyota Estima (Japan only)	Automobile		
2002	Honda	Honda Civic Hybrid	Automobile	Mild hybrid, 2003 model	
2002?	Mazda	Mazda Demio e-4WD (Japanese market only)	Automobile	Used the electric motor for traction assistance	
2002	Mitsubishi	Mitsubishi Fuso Aero Star Nonstep HEV bus, second generation	Bus		
2002	Nova Bus	Nova Bus RTS HEV bus (4 units built)	Bus		
2002	Motor Coach Industries	MCI D4000 HEV (4 units built)	Bus		
2002	Wrightbus	Wright Electrocity	Bus		
2002	New Flyer Industries	New Flyer DE60LF	Bus		
2003	Hino	Hino Ranger Hybrid, light-duty, for sale in Japan only. Fourth generation	Truck		
2003	Orion International	Orion VII hybrid bus	Bus		
2003	TransBus International	TransBus Enviro200H	Bus		
2003	Suzuki	Suzuki Twin	Automobile		
2003	Toyota	Toyota Alphard hybrid (Japan only)	Automobile		
2003	Toyota	Toyota Prius	Automobile	(5-seat midsize, 2004–2009 model, second generation Hybrid Synergy Drive 1,000,000 sold (as of May 15, 2008))	48 mpg (city); 45 mpg (highway)
2003	Toyota	Dyna Diesel Hybrid/Toyoace hybrid (commercial truck, Japan only, diesel hybrid)	Automobile		
2004	Chevrolet	Chevrolet Silverado/GMC Sierra Hybrid	Automobile	Mild hybrid, w/no electrical motor for propulsion, electricity only used to power accessories	
2004	Ford	Ford Escape Hybrid (2005 model)	SUV		
2004	Honda	Honda Accord Hybrid	Automobile	Mild hybrid, 2005–2007 model, discontinued due to slow sales	25 mpg (city); 34 mpg (highway)
2004	Toyota	Hino Dutro/Toyota Dyna Hybrid, light-duty, for sale in Japan only. Fourth generation	Truck		
2004	New Flyer Industries	New Flyer GE40LF (gasoline–electric hybrid bus)	Bus		
2004	Hino	Hino S'elega R Hybrid	Bus		
2004	Hino	Hino Blue Ribbon City Hybrid	Bus		
2004	Gillig Corporation	Gillig Low Floor Hybrid	Bus		
2005	Honda	Honda Civic Hybrid	Automobile	2006 model, second generation	49 mpg (city); 51 mpg (highway)
2005	Lexus	Lexus RX 400h	Automobile	2006 model, 3MZ-FE V6 engine	(AWD) 27 mpg (city); 25 mpg (highway)
2005	Toyota	Toyota Highlander/Klueger Hybrid	Automobile	2006-2007 model, 3MZ-FE V6 engine	2WD; 33 mpg (city); 28 mpg (highway); 4WD; 31 mpg (city); 27 mpg (highway)
2005	Mercury automobile	Mercury Mariner hybrid	Automobile	Twin of Ford Escape Hybrid (2005 model)	
2006	IC Corporation	IC Corporation Hybrid School Bus	Bus		
2006	Nova Bus	Nova Bus LFS HEV	Bus		
2006	Wrightbus	Wright Pulsar Gemini HEV	Bus		
2006	New Flyer Industries	New Flyer DE40LFR	Bus		
2006	Saturn Corporation	Saturn Vue Green Line	Automobile	BAS, mild hybrid, 2007 model	(2WD) 27 mpg (city); 32 mpg (highway)
2006	Lexus	Lexus GS 450h	Automobile	2007 model, 2GR-FSE engine	25 mpg (city); 28 mpg (highway)
2006	Toyota	Toyota Camry Hybrid	Automobile	2007 model, 2AZ-FXE engine	40 mpg (city); 38 mpg (highway)
2006	Toyota	Toyota Estima hybrid (redesign, minivan, Japan only)	Automobile	It is claimed by Toyota to be the world's first hybrid minibus.	
2006	Mitsubishi Fuso Truck & Bus Corporation	Canter Eco Hybrid	Truck		
2006		International FTTS	Truck		
2007	New Flyer Industries	New Flyer DE60LFR	Bus		
2007	Lexus	Lexus LS600hL	Automobile	2008 model, first V8 full hybrid, 2UR-FSE engine	
2007	Nissan	Nissan Altima	Automobile	Licensed Toyota Hybrid Synergy Drive	42 mpg (city); 36 mpg (highway)
2007	Toyota	Toyota Highlander/Kluger Hybrid	Automobile	2008 vehicle redesign, mostly same 3MZ-FE V6 engine	
2007	Hino	Hybrid 6500 Medium, light-duty, available in Australia.	Truck		
2007	E-One	E-ONE Hybrid Command Center	Truck		
2007	Eaton Corporation	Medium-duty hybrid trucks fully commercialized in conjunction with FedEx Express and other partners	Truck		
2007	Ford	Ford Escape Hybrid	SUV	2008 model year	(2WD) 36 mpg (city) 31 mpg (highway) (4WD) 32 mpg (city) 29 mpg (highway)
2007	Mazda	Mazda Tribute Hybrid	SUV	Twin of Ford Escape Hybrid	
2007	Mercury automobile	Mercury Mariner Hybrid	SUV	Twin of Ford Escape Hybrid	
2008	Alexander Dennis	Alexander Dennis Enviro200H	Bus		
2008	Alexander Dennis	Alexander Dennis Enviro400H	Bus		
2008	Alexander Dennis	Alexander Dennis Enviro500H	Bus		
2008	Beiqi Foton/Eaton Corporation	Beiqi Foton with Eaton Corp. diesel–electric hybrid powertrains	Bus		
2008	Hino	Hino S'elega Hybrid (second generation)	Bus		
2008	New Flyer	Xcelsior XDE40 Hybrid	Bus		
2008	Optare	Optare Tempo	Bus		
2008	Volvo	Volvo B5L Hybrid	Bus		
2008	Wrightbus	Wright Gemini 2 HEV	Bus		
2008	Chevrolet	Chevrolet Malibu	Automobile	BAS, mild hybrid, canceled in 2009	
2008	Buick	Buick Lacrosse Hybrid	Automobile	BAS, mild hybrid, Chinese market only, Twin of Chevrolet Malibu	
2008	Cadillac	Cadillac Escalade (2009 model)	SUV	Global Hybrid Cooperation	
2008	Chevrolet	Chevrolet Tahoe (2008 model)	SUV	Global Hybrid Cooperation, RWD/AWD	
2008	GMC	GMC Yukon Hybrid (2008 model)	SUV	Global Hybrid Cooperation	
2008	Chevrolet	Chevrolet Silverado Hybrid (2009 model)	Truck	Global Hybrid Cooperation, first full hybrid full-size pickup truck	2WD 18 mpg (city)/21 mpg (highway); 4WD 17 mpg (city)/19 mpg (highway)
2008	GMC	GMC Sierra Hybrid (2009 model)	Truck	Global Hybrid Cooperation	2WD 18 mpg (city)/21 mpg (highway); 4WD 17 mpg (city)/19 mpg (highway)
2008	Dodge	Dodge Durango Hybrid (2009 model)	SUV	Global Hybrid Cooperation, 2009 model only, Estimated overall production figures for the Durango and Aspen hybrid is around 800 cars	
2008	Chrysler	Chrysler Aspen Hybrid (2009 model)	SUV	Twin of Dodge Durango Hybrid	
2008	Saturn Corporation	Saturn Vue Green Line (2008–2010 model)	Automobile	BAS, mild hybrid	
2008	Saturn Corporation	Saturn AURA Green Line (2008–2010 model)	Automobile	BAS, mild hybrid	28 mpg (city) 35 mpg (highway)
2008	Toyota	Toyota Crown hybrid	Automobile	Redsign, now a full hybrid, Japanese market	
2008	BYD Auto	BYD F3DM Plug-in hybrid, (China market)	Automobile		
2008	Komatsu Limited	Komatsu PC200-8 Hybrid excavator	Excavator		
2009	BMW	BMW X6 ActiveHybrid (US market)	Automobile	Global Hybrid Cooperation, BMW's first full hybrid	
2009	Ford	Ford Fusion Hybrid	Automobile	1st generation (2010), rebadged variant of Mercury Milan Hybrid, Lincoln MKZ Hybrid	
2009	Mercury	Mercury Milan Hybrid	Automobile	Rebadged variant of Ford Fusion Hybrid, Lincoln MKZ Hybrid	
2009	Honda	Honda Insight (2010 model year)	Automobile	Second-generation model, now as a 5-door hatchback	
2009	Lexus	Lexus RX 450h	Automobile	2010 model, 2GR-FXE V6 engine, 2nd generation	
2009	Lexus	Lexus HS 250h/Toyota Sai	Automobile	2AZ-FXE engine, similar to Camry hybrid	
2009	Mercedes-Benz	Mercedes S400 BlueHybrid	Automobile	Global Hybrid Cooperation, mild hybrid, first lithium-ion battery hybrid and first Mercedes hybrid	
2009	Mercedes-Benz	Mercedes ML 450 Hybrid 4MATIC	SUV	Global Hybrid Cooperation	
2009	Toyota	Toyota Prius	Automobile	3rd generation, 2010 model year, 2ZR-FXE I4 engine	51 mpg (city) 48 mpg (highway)
2009	Phoenix Motorcars	Phoenix Motorcars	Automobile	Starts selling plug-in hybrid SUV & Truck in California 2009 (also available all-electric); Assembled in the United States; no projected release date outside California yet	
2009	Hyundai Motor Company	Hyundai Elantra LPI Hybrid	Automobile	first hybrid to adopt advanced lithium polymer (Li–Poly) batteries and liquefied petroleum gas (LPG) as fuel; South Korean market only	
2010s
2010	BMW	BMW ActiveHybrid 7	Automobile	Mild hybrid, lithium-ion battery	
2010	Fiat	Fiat Panda hybrid fuel cell/battery	Automobile		
2010	Honda	Honda CR-Z	Automobile		
2010	Honda	Honda Fit Hybrid	Automobile	Japanese and European market only	
2010	Hyundai	Hyundai Sonata Hybrid	Automobile	2011 model, sales began end of 2010	
2010	Toyota	Toyota Auris Hybrid	Automobile	2ZR-FXE I4 engine. similar to 3rd gen Prius powertrain	
2010	Toyota	Toyota Highlander hybrid	Automobile	revised hybrid powertrain, similar to RX 450h, 2011 model	
2010	Lincoln	MKZ Hybrid	Automobile	1st generation (2011), rebadged variant of Ford Fusion Hybrid and Mercury Milan Hybrid	
2010	Porsche	Porsche Cayenne S	Automobile	2011 model, sales began end of 2010	
2010	Chevrolet	Volt	Automobile	2011 model, also called Opel Ampera	
2010	Alexander Dennis	Alexander Dennis Enviro350H	Bus		
2010	New Flyer	Xcelsior XDE35 Hybrid	Bus		
2010	Optare	Optare Versa	Bus		
2010	Porsche	Porsche 918 Spyder	Automobile	2014 Model. 4.6L V8 engine + 2 electric motors – 823 bhp (614 kW; 834 PS)	
2011	Honda	Honda Civic Hybrid	Automobile	2011 redesign, 1.5L engine, lithium-ion battery	
2011	Kia	Kia Optima Hybrid	Automobile	2011 model, Twin of Hyundai Sonata Hybrid	
2011	Infiniti	Infiniti M35 Hybrid	Automobile	2011 model	
2011	Toyota	Toyota Prius v/Toyota Prius α	Automobile	2012 model. It will be called Prius + in Europe	
2011	Toyota	Toyota Camry Hybrid	Automobile	2012 model	
2011	Volkswagen	VW Touareg Hybrid	SUV	2012 model	
2011	Fisker Automotive	Fisker Karma	Automobile	2012 model	
2011	Toyota	Crown	Automobile	2012 model, Japanese and Chinese market	
2011	Lexus	Lexus CT 200h hybrid	Automobile	similar to Prius powertrain, 2ZR-FXE I4 engine	
2011	Peugeot	Peugeot 3008 HYbrid4	Automobile	The world's first production diesel–electric hybrid	
2011	Peugeot	Peugeot 508 RXH	Automobile	diesel–electric hybrid	
2011	Citroën	Citroën DS5 HYbrid4	Automobile	diesel–electric hybrid	
2011	Porsche	Panamera S Hybrid	Automobile	2012 Model	
2011	Audi	A8 Hybrid	Automobile	2012 model	
2011	Audi	A6 Hybrid	Automobile	2012 model	
2011	Audi	Q5 Hybrid	SUV	2012 model	
2011	Mercedes-Benz	E 300 Bluetec Hybrid, E 400 Hybrid	Automobile	2012 - 2016 model years. E 300 Bluetec Hybrid is a diesel–electric hybrid	
2011	Toyota	Toyota Prius c/Toyota Aqua	Automobile	Several world markets except Europe, called Aqua in Japan	
2011	Chevrolet	Malibu Hybrid	Automobile	2011 model year, mild hybrid using GM eAssist	
2012	Buick	LaCrosse Hybrid	Automobile	2012 model year, twin of Chevrolet Malibu Hybrid	
2012	Buick	Regal	Automobile	2012 model year, mild hybrid using GM eAssist	
2012	Toyota	Toyota Prius Plug-in Hybrid	Automobile	It is based on the 2012 Prius third generation. Available in Japan, U.S. and Europe	
2012	Toyota	Toyota Yaris Hybrid	Automobile	Europe only. Available since June 2012.	
2012	Lexus	Lexus ES 300h	Automobile	2012 model	
2012	Lexus	Lexus GS 450h	Automobile	2012 model	
2012	Honda	Acura ILX Hybrid	Automobile		
2012	BYD	Qin plug-in hybrid	Automobile		
2012	BMW	BMW ActiveHybrid 5	Automobile	2013 model	
2012	BMW	BMW ActiveHybrid 3	Automobile	2013 model	
2012	Ford	Ford Fusion Hybrid	Automobile	2013 model	
2012	Lincoln	MKZ Hybrid	Automobile	2nd generation (2013-1020), rebadged variant of Ford Fusion Hybrid and Mercury Milan Hybrid	
2012	Ford	Ford C-Max Hybrid	Compact MPV	2013 model	
2012	Ford	Ford C-Max Energi plug-in hybrid	Compact MPV/SUV	2013 model	
2012	Volvo	Volvo V60 Plug-in Hybrid (diesel)	Wagon	Scheduled for November 2012 (Europe only)	
2012	Volkswagen	Volkswagen Jetta Hybrid	Automobile	Scheduled for late 2012 as a 2013 model	
2012	Toyota	Toyota Avalon Hybrid	Automobile	2013 model year	
2012	New Flyer	Xcelsior XDE60 Hybrid	Bus		
2013	Ford	Ford Fusion Energi plug-in hybrid	Automobile	U.S. sales scheduled to begin by early 2013	
2013	Mitsubishi	Mitsubishi Outlander PHEV	SUV	Sales scheduled to begin in the Japanese market in the first half of 2013	
2013	Honda	Honda Accord Hybrid	Automobile	2014 model year	
2013	Honda	Honda Accord Plug-in Hybrid	Automobile	2014 model year	
2013	Honda	Honda Fit Hybrid	Automobile	2014 model year, Japanese Market only	
2013	Honda	Honda City / Grace Hybrid	Automobile	2014 model year, Japanese / Malaysian Market only	
2013	Honda	Vezel / HR-V hybrid	SUV	Japanese Market only, 2014 model year	
2013	Nissan	Pathfinder Hybrid	SUV	2014 model year, canceled within the same year or the next depending on country	
2013	Subaru	Crosstrek Hybrid	SUV	2014 model year	
2013	BMW	BMW i3 REx	Automobile	This is the plug-in hybrid version of all-electric car scheduled for late 2013	
2013	Fisker	Fisker Surf		Production is scheduled for 2013	
2013	Cadillac	Cadillac ELR plug-in hybrid	Automobile	Scheduled for U.S. market launch by late 2013 as a 2014 model year, Related to Chevy Volt	
2013	McLaren	McLaren P1	Automobile	3.8L Twin-turbo V8 engine with KERS – 903 bhp (673 kW; 916 PS). Can run on battery alone	
2013	Ferrari	LaFerrari	Automobile	2014 model year. 6.3L V12 engine with KERS – 963 bhp (718 kW; 976 PS)	
2013	Porsche	Panamera S E-Hybrid	Automobile	2014 model year	
2013	Roewe	550 PHEV	Automobile		
2014	Chevrolet	Impala	Automobile	2014 model year, mild hybrid with eAssist, discontinued in 2015 due to poor sales	
2014	Acura	RLX Sport Hybrid	Automobile	2014 model year	
2014	Lexus	NX 300h	SUV	2015 model year	
2014	Nissan	X-Trail Hybrid	SUV	2015 model year, for the Asian market	
2014	Infiniti	Q70	Automobile	2014 model year, rename of Infiniti M35 Hybrid	
2014	Infiniti	Q50	Automobile	2014 model year	
2014	Infiniti	QX60	SUV	2014 model year	
2014	BMW	BMW i8	Automobile	Retail deliveries began in June 2014	
2014	BMW	BMW 530 LE	Automobile	2015 model, Chinese market	
2014	Porsche	Cayenne S E-Hybrid	SUV	2015 model year	
2014	Audi	Q7 e-tron	SUV		
2014	Audi	A3 Sportback e-tron	Automobile		
2014	Volkswagen	Golf GTE	Automobile	Shares the same powertrain as the Audi A3 Sportback e-tron	
2014	Volkswagen	XL1	Automobile	Limited run of 250 vehicles	
2015	BMW	BMW 225xe iPerformance	Automobile	Retail deliveries began late 2015	
2015	BMW	X5 xDrive 40e iPerformance	SUV	2016 model year	
2015	BMW	X1 xDrive 25LE	SUV	2016 model year, Chinese market	
2015	BYD	Tang	SUV		
2015	Chevrolet	Volt	Automobile	2016 model year	
2015	Hyundai	Sonata PHEV	Automobile	2016 model year	
2015	Kia	Optima Hybrid	Automobile	2016 model year, twin of Hyundai Sonota, but is not a PHEV	
2015	Mercedes-Benz	C350e	Automobile	2016 model year	
2015	Mercedes-Benz	GLC 350e	SUV	2016 model year	
2015	Mercedes-Benz	GLE 550e	SUV	2016 model year	
2015	Mercedes-Benz	S500e	Automobile	2016 model year	
2015	Toyota	Prius	Automobile	2016 model year	
2015	Toyota	RAV4	SUV	2016 model year	
2015	Lexus	RX 450h	SUV	2016 model year	
2015	Nissan	Murano Hybrid	SUV	2016 model year	
2015	Volvo	XC90 T8	SUV	2016 model year	
2015	Volkswagen	Passat GTE	Automobile		
2016	BMW	BMW 330e iPerformance	Automobile	Retail deliveries began 2016	
2016	BMW	740e iPerformance	Automobile	2017 model year	
2016	BMW	530e iPerformance	Automobile	2017 model year	
2016	Mercedes	E 350e	Automobile	2017 model year	
2016	Chrysler	Pacifica Hybrid	Van	2017 model year	
2016	Chevrolet	Malibu Hybrid	Automobile	2016 model year, first full hybrid of Malibu	
2016	Chevrolet	Silverado Hybrid	Truck	2016 model year, mild hybrid with eAssist, California only 2016, only certain states 2017	
2016	GMC	Sierra Hybrid	Truck	2016 model year, twin of Chevrolet Silverado Hybrid	
2016	Ferrari	LaFerrari Aperta	Automobile	2016 model year	
2016	Koenigsegg	Regera	Automobile	2016 model year, utilizes 3 electric motors and a single speed gearbox	
2016	Hyundai	Hyundai Ioniq	Automobile	Retail deliveries began 2016	
2016	Kia	Niro	SUV	2017 model year	
2016	Kia	Optima PHEV	Automobile	2017 model year, Twin of Hyundai Sonata PHEV	
2016	Toyota	Prius Prime	Automobile	2017 model year, PHEV version of Prius	
2016	Volvo	S90 T8	Automobile	2017 model year	
2016	Volvo	V90 T8	Wagon	2017 model year	
2016	Zinoro	60H	Automobile		
2017	Honda/Acura	Honda NSX	Automobile	2017 model year. Released March 14, 2016. 3.5L V6 engine – 573 bhp (427 kW; 581 PS).	
2017	Honda/Acura	Acura MDX Sport Hybrid	SUV	2017 model year	
2017	Honda	CR-V	SUV	2018 model year	
2017	Honda	Clarity Plug-in Hybrid	Automobile	2017 model year	
2017	Honda	Accord Hybrid	Automobile	2018 model year	
2017	Toyota	Camry Hybrid	Automobile	2018 model year	
2017	Nissan	Rouge Hybrid	SUV	2017 model year, canceled in 2020 due to slow sales, related to the earlier Nissan X-Trail Hybrid for Asia	
2017	Mini	Countryman S E ALL4 PHEV	SUV	2018 model year	
2017	Volvo	XC60 T8	SUV	2018 model year	
2017	LEVC	TX	Automobile	London Taxi; Range extender series hybrid	
2017	Lexus	LS500h	Automobile	2018 model year	
2017	Lexus	LC500h	Automobile	2018 model year and first car to employ a dual transmission (CVT and 4-speed automatic)	
2017	Cadillac	CT6 Plug-in Hybrid	Automobile		
2018	Buick	LaCrosse	Automobile	2018 model year, twin of Chevrolet Malibu Hybrid, but different drivetrain, still a mild hybrid and uses eAssist in the US and a different system in China	
2018	Land Rover	Evoque P300e	SUV	2019 model year	
2018?	Jaguar	E-Pace P300e	SUV	2019 model year	
2018	Land Rover	Range Rover P400e	SUV	2019 model year	
2018?	Jaguar	F-Pace P400e	SUV	2019 model year	
2018	Volvo	XC40 Recharge	SUV	2019 model year, Recharge trim also used for the full EV	
2018	Volvo	S60 T8 TE	Automobile	2019 model year	
2018	Audi	A6 & A6 Allroad	Automobile	2019 model year, PHEV and MHEV	
2018	BMW	X5	SUV	2019 model year, PHEV	
2018	BMW	X1 xDrive25e	SUV	2019 model year, PHEV, continuation of 2016 Chinese market BMW X1 for all markets	
2018	BMW	330e	Automobile	2019 model year, PHEV	
2018	Mercedes	A 250 e	Automobile	2019 model year	
2018	Mercedes	B 250 e	Automobile	2019 model year	
2018	Mercedes	GLE 350e/ 350de/ 400e/ AMG 53 Hybrid	SUV	2019 model year	
2018	Mercedes - AMG	GT 63 S E-Performance	Automobile	2019 model year	
2018	Subaru	Crosstrek Hybrid	SUV	2019 model year (2nd generation, US market compliance car)	
2018	Subaru	Crosstrek eBOXER	SUV	2019 model year, European market	
2018	Subaru	Forester eBOXER	SUV	2019 model year, European market	
2018	Honda	Insight	Automobile	2019 model year	
2018	Toyota	Corolla Hybrid	Automobile	2019 model year	
2018	Toyota	Rav4 Hybrid	Automobile	2019 model year, HEV and PHEV	
2018	Toyota	Crown	Automobile	2019 model year, Asian Market	
2018	Lexus	UX 250h/260h	SUV	2019 model year	
2018	Kia	Forte Hybrid	Automobile	2019 model year	
2018	Hyundai	Kona Hybrid	SUV	2019 model year	
2019	Hyundai	Sonata Hybrid	Automobile	2020 model year	
2019	Volvo	V60 T8	Wagon	2020 model year	
2019	Honda	Fit / Jazz	Automobile	2020 model year, Asian and European market	
2019	Honda	City	Automobile	2020 model year, Asian market	
2019	Lexus	LM 300h	Van	2020 model year, Japanese market	
2019	Lincoln	Aviator PHEV	SUV	2020 model year	
2019	Lincoln	Corsair PHEV	SUV	2020 model year	
2019	Jeep	Wrangler	SUV	2019-2020 model year, Mild hybrid utilizing FCA's eTorque BAS system	
2019	Ram	1500	Truck	2019 model year, Mild hybrid utilizing FCA's eTorque BAS system	
2019	Bentley	Bentayga	SUV	2019 model year	
2019	Bentley	Flying Spur	Automobile	2019 model year	
2019	Audi	Q8 TFSI e quattro	SUV	2020 model year, PHEV and MHEV	
2019	Audi	Q5	SUV	2020 model year, PHEV and MHEV	
2019	Audi	A8	Automobile	2020 model year, PHEV and MHEV	
2019	Lamborghini	Sian FKP 37	Automobile	2020 model year, under 100 cars produced, uses supercapacitors instead of a battery	
2019	BMW	X3 xDrive30e	SUV	2020 model year, PHEV	
2019	BMW	X2 xDrive 25e	SUV	2020 model year, PHEV	
2019	Mercedes	CLA 250e	Automobile	2020 model year	
2019	Mercedes	GLA 250e	SUV	2020 model year	
2020s
2020	Jeep	Renegade	SUV	2021 model year, European Market, Fiat Global Small Engine	
2020	Jeep	Compass 4xe	SUV	2021 model year, European Market, Fiat Global Small Engine	
2020	Fiat	500 Hybrid	Automobile	mild hybrid	
2020	Ferrari	SF90 Stradale	Automobile	2020 model year	
2020	Ford	Explorer	SUV	2020 model year	
2020	Ford	Escape	SUV	2020 model year, hybrid and PHEV variants	
2020	Ford	F-150 PowerBoost	Truck	2021 model year	
2020	McLaren	Speedtail	Automobile	2020 model year	
2020	Land Rover	Range Rover MHEV	SUV	2021 model year, all models use the same MHEV engines (3.0L i6 or diesel variants)	
2020	Audi	A7 TFSIe	Automobile	2021 model year, PHEV	
2020	Audi	A3	Automobile	2021 model year, PHEV and MHEV	
2020	Audi	Q3	Automobile	2021 model year, PHEV	
2020	Volkswagen	Touareg eHybrid	SUV	2021 model year, PHEV	
2020	Volkswagen	Tiguan eHybrid	SUV	2021 model year, PHEV	
2020	Volkswagen	Arteon eHybrid	Automobile	2021 model year, PHEV	
2020	Volkswagen	Golf GTE / TSI eHybrid	Automobile	2021 model year, PHEV	
2020	Mercedes	S 450e/ 580e	Automobile	2021 model year	
2020	Honda	Vezel / HR-V	SUV	2021 model year, Asian and European markets	
2020	Toyota	Sienna	Van	2021 model year	
2020	Toyota	Venza	SUV	2021 model year	
2020	Toyota	Corolla Cross Hybrid	SUV	2021 model year	
2020	Hyundai	Santa Fe	SUV	2021 model year	
2020	Hyundai	Elantra	Automobile	2021 model year	
2020	Hyundai	Tucson	SUV	2021-2022 model year, depending on country, both MHEV, HEV, and PHEV variants	
2020	Kia	Sorento	SUV	2021 model year	
2020	Kia	K5	Automobile	2021 model year	
2020	Kia	Carnival	Van	2021 model year	
2021	Lamborghini	Countach	Automobile	2022 model year, same drivetrain as the Sian, only 112 units sold	
2021	Volkswagen	Multivan	Van	2022 model year, PHEV	
2021	Mercedes	C 300e/ 63 AMG S E- Performance	Automobile	2022 model year	
2021	Mercedes	GLC 300e/ 300de/ 350e/ 400e/ AMG 63	SUV	2022 model year	
2021	Toyota	Tundra	Truck	2022 model year	
2021	Nissan	Qashqai e-Power	SUV	2022 model year	
2021	Nissan	X-Trail E-Power	SUV	2022 model year	
2021	Lexus	NX 350h/450h	SUV	2022 model year	
2021	Opel	Astra Hybrid	Automobile	2022 model year	
2021	Fiat	500x	SUV	2022 model year, Europe market, Fiat Global Small Engine	
2021	Fiat	Tipo	SUV	2022 model year, Europe market, Fiat Global Small Engine	
2021	Jeep	Wrangler 4xe	SUV	2021 model year	
2021	Jeep	Grand Cherokee	SUV	2022 model year, Mild hybrid utilizing eTorque BAS system	
2022	Jeep	Wagoneer	SUV	2022 model year, Mild hybrid utilizing eTorque BAS system	
2022	Ford	Maverick	Truck	2022 model year	
2022	Honda	Accord	Automobile	2023 model year	
2022	Honda	Civic	Automobile	2023 model year	
2022	Honda	CR-V	SUV	2023 model year	
2022	Honda	ZR-V	SUV	2023 model year, Asian market only	
2022	Suzuki	Grand Vitara	SUV	2022 model year, Asian and African Markets	
2022	Toyota	Urban Cruiser Hyryder Hybrid	SUV	Twin of Suzuki Grand Vitara	
2022	Toyota	Innova Zenix Hybrid	MPV	2022 model year, Asian Market	
2022	Toyota	Sequoia	SUV	2023 model year, hybrid only powertrain	
2022	Toyota	Crown	Automobile	2023 model year	
2022	Toyota	Prius	Automobile	2023 model year, 5th generation, HEV and PHEV (Prius Prime)	
2022	Lexus	RX 350h/500h/450h+	SUV	2023 model year	
2022	Mazda	CX-60 PHEV	SUV	2023 model year, first Mazda PHEV, sold everywhere but US	
2022	McLaren	Artura	Automobile	2022 model year	
2022	Ferrari	296 GTB	Automobile	2022 model year	
2022	Alfa Romeo	Tonale	SUV	2023 model year, Fiat Global Small Engine	
2022	Dodge	Hornet R/T	SUV	Twin of Alfa Romeo Tonale	
2022	BMW	7 Series	Automobile	2023 model year, PHEV or MHEV for all engines	
2022	BMW	XM	SUV	2023 model year, PHEV	
2022	Genesis	G90 E-Supercharged	Automobile	2023 model year, utilizes an electric supercharger	
2022	Kia	Sportage	SUV	2023 model year	
2023	Hyundai	Santa Fe	SUV	2024 model year	
2023	Hyundai	Kona	SUV	2024 model year	
2023	Mazda	MX-30 PHEV	SUV	2023 model year, EUDM and JDM only	
2023	Mazda	CX-90 PHEV	SUV	2024 model year	
2023	Mazda	CX-50 Hybrid	SUV	2024 model year, uses Toyota drivetrain	
2023	Lincoln	Nautilus Hybrid	SUV	2024 model year	
2023	Toyota	Tacoma	Truck	2024 model year	
2023	Toyota	Land Cruiser	SUV	2024 model year	
2023	Toyota	Grand Highlander	SUV	2024 model year	
2023	Lexus	TX 500h/550h+	SUV	2024 model year, Twin of the Toyota Grand Highlander	
2023	Lexus	LBX	SUV	2024 model year, European and Japanese market	
2023	Lexus	LM 300h/500h	Van	2024 model year, Japanese market	
2023	Jeep	Grand Cherokee 4xe	SUV	2023 model year	
2023	Lamborghini	Revuelto	Automobile	2024 model year	
2023	Volkswagen	Passat eHybrid	Automobile	2024 model year, PHEV and MHEV	
2023	BMW	5 Series	Automobile	2024 model year, PHEV or MHEV for all engines	
2023	Mercedes	SL 63 S E-Performance	Automobile	2024 model year	
2023	Mercedes	E 300e/ 300de/ 350e/ 53 hybrid+	Automobile	2024 model year	
2023	Mercedes	CLE 300e	Automobile	2024 model year	
2023	Mercedes - AMG	GT63 S E-Performance	Automobile	2024 model year	
2024	Volkswagen	Transporter / Caravelle	Van	2025 model year, PHEV	
2024	Toyota	Crown Signia	Wagon	2025 model year, replaces the Toyota Venza	
2024	Toyota	Camry	Automobile	2025 model year	
2024	Mazda	CX-70 PHEV	SUV	2025 model year	
2024	Chevrolet	Corvette E-Ray	Automobile	2024 model year	
2024	Koenigsegg	Gemera	Automobile	single motor hybrid, 4 door	
2025	Aston Martin	Valhalla	Automobile	proposed hybrid, 2025 model year	
2025	Porsche	911 Carrera GTS T-Hybrid	Automobile	2025 model year	
2025	KGM	Torres	Automobile	2025 model year	
2025	Jeep	Cherokee	SUV	2026 model year	
2026	Bugatti	Tourbillon	Automobile	Upcoming car, propose hybrid, 2026 model year	

=== Early designs: 1899–1917 ===
- 1899: Carmaker Pieper of Belgium introduced a vehicle with an under-seat electric motor and a gasoline engine. It used the internal combustion engine to charge its batteries at cruise speed and used both motors to accelerate or climb a hill. Auto-Mixte, also of Belgium, built vehicles from 1906 to 1912 under the Pieper patents.
- 1900: Ferdinand Porsche, then a young engineer at Jacob Lohner & Co. creates the first gasoline–electric hybrid vehicles.
- 1901: Jacob Lohner & Co. produces the first Lohner–Porsche, a series of gasoline–electric hybrid vehicles based on employee Ferdinand Porsche's novel drivetrain. These vehicles had a driveline that was either gas or electric, but not both at the same time.
- 1905 or sooner: Fischer Motor Vehicle Co., Hoboken, NJ produces and sells a petrol–electric omnibus in the United States and in London, including battery storage.
- 1907: AL (French car)
- 1917: Woods Dual Power Car had a driveline similar to the current GMC/Chevrolet Silverado hybrid pickup truck.

== Concepts ==
- 1989: Audi Duo, first Audi hybrid based on the Audi C3 100 Avant
- 1991: Audi Duo II
- 2008: Chrysler Town and Country Plug-in hybrid, part of Fiat Chrysler group called ENVI to make hybrid and electric cars
- 2008: Jeep Wrangler Plug-in hybrid, part of Fiat Chrysler group called ENVI to make hybrid and electric cars
- 2009: Jeep Patriot Plug-in hybrid, part of Fiat Chrysler group called ENVI to make hybrid and electric cars
- 2009: Chrysler 200C Plug-in hybrid, part of Fiat Chrysler group called ENVI to make hybrid and electric cars
- 2010: Ram 1500 Plug-in hybrid

== Buses ==
=== Date unknown ===
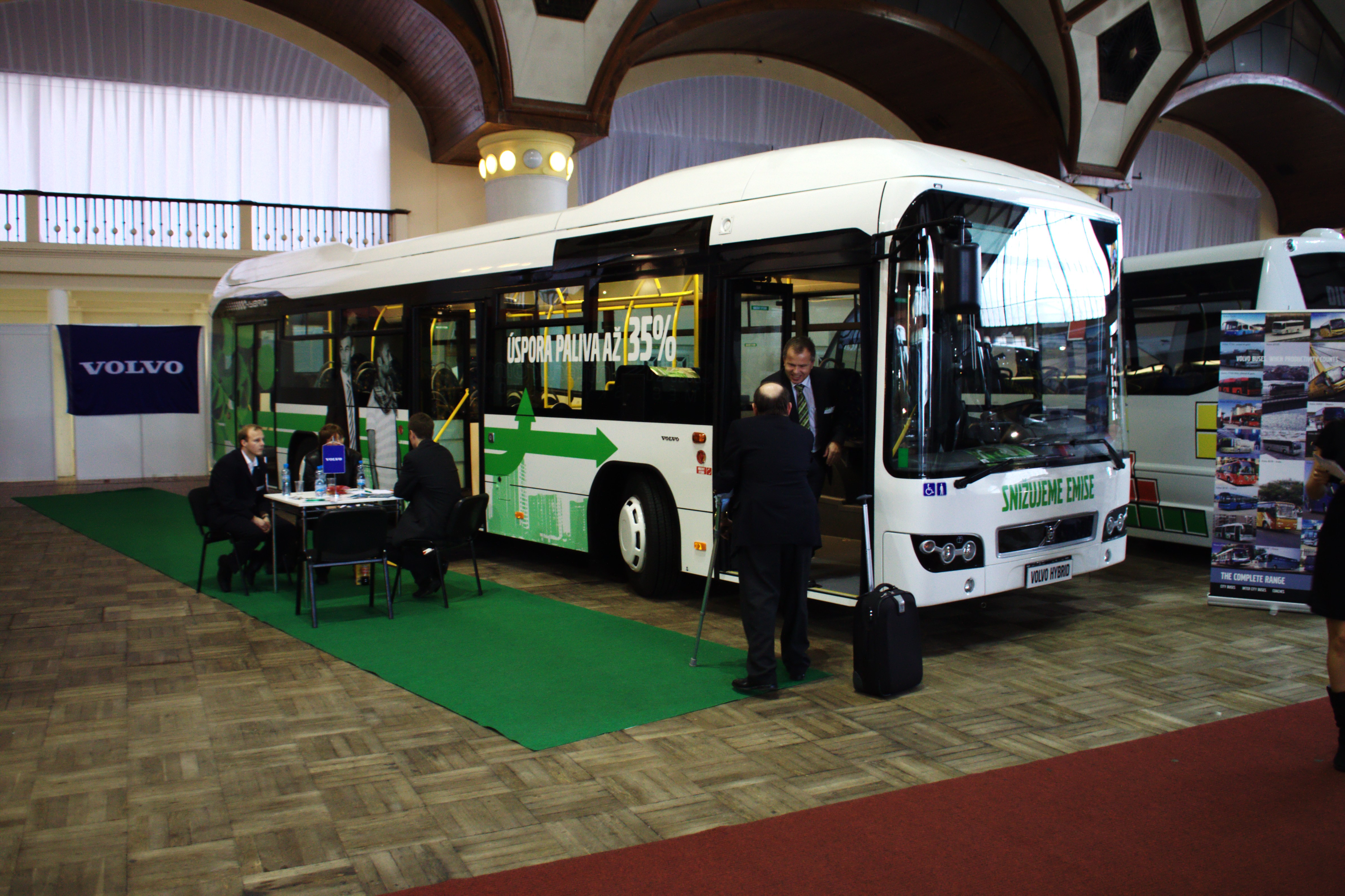
Hybrid Volvo 7700H bus at the Czech Bus Fair 2011

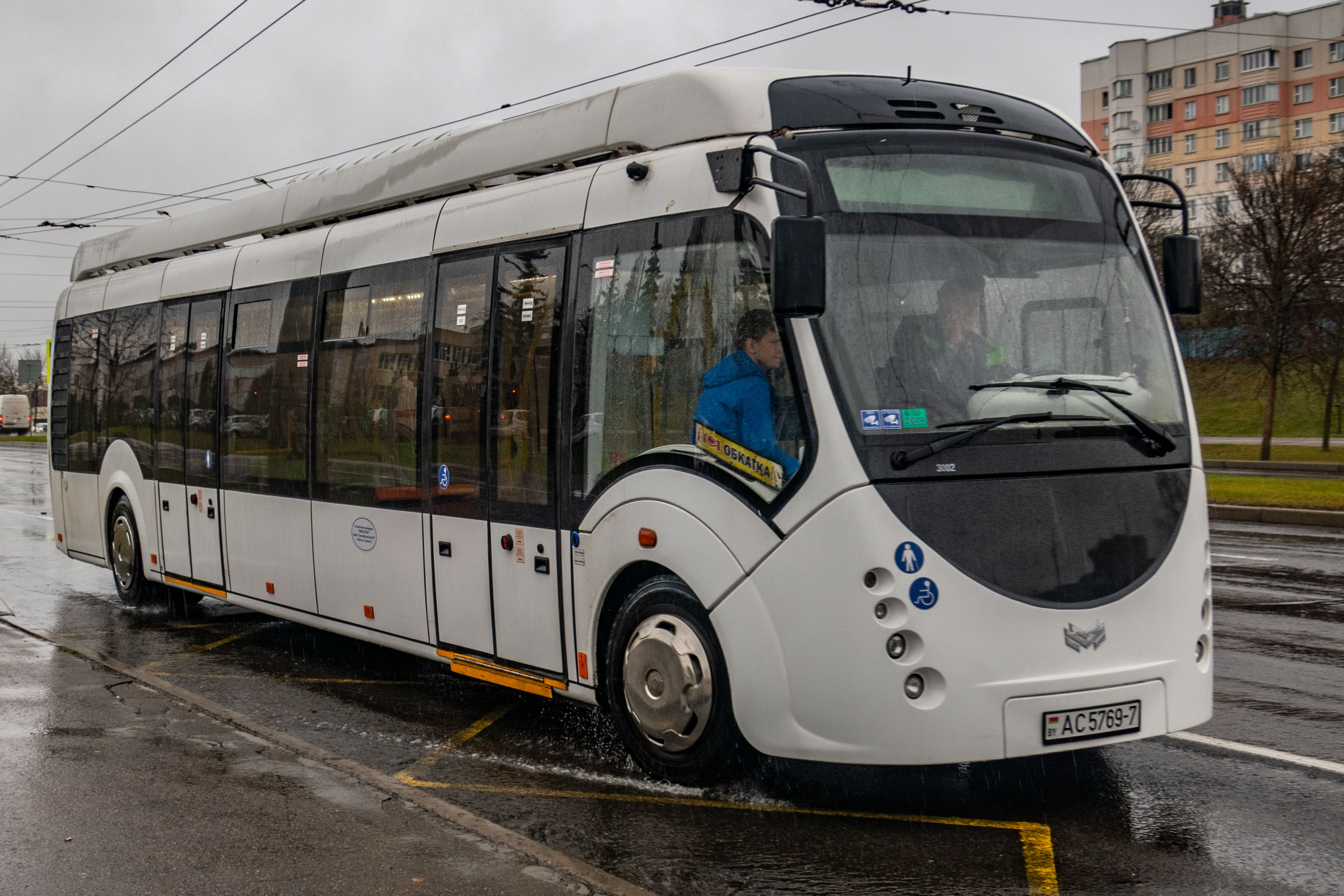
Belkommunmash AKSM-4202K in Minsk, Belarus

- Castrosua Tempus (in use in Barcelona, Granada, Lugo, Madrid, Santiago de Compostela, Sevilla)
- Irisbus Hynobis (Castellón)
- MAN Lion's City Hybrid:
  - Italy: Trento
  - Portugal: Lisboa and Oporto.
  - Spain:Barcelona, Cádiz, Madrid, Málaga, Murcia, San Sebastián, Sevilla and Valladolid
- Mercedes Benz/Orion VII Hybrid
- North American Bus Industries 60-BRT Hybrid
- Scania OmniLink, ethanol–electric hybrid buses, (Stockholm)
- Solaris:
  - Germany: Dresden, Glonn, Hannover, Leipzig and Munich)
  - Poland: Sosnowiec and Poznań
  - Spain: Madrid
  - Switzerland: Lenzburg
- Tecnobus Gulliver (hybrid electric and all-electric versions), sold by Hispano Carrocera
- Volvo 7700
- Chery A3
- Chang’an (Chana) Zhi-xiang
- Belkommunmash AKSM-4202K

== See also ==
- List of battery electric vehicles
- List of modern production plug-in electric vehicles
- SmILE
- Comparison of Toyota hybrids
