= AL (automobile) =

French automobile

AL was a French automobile manufactured by L'Energie Electro-Mécanique based at Suresnes. In 1907, the company manufactured one of the first recorded hybrid cars (the Lohner–Porsche was earlier, as was the Pieper), it was a combination gas-electric vehicle that ran at 24 hp.
