= Audi hybrid vehicles =

Overview of the hybrid vehicles by Audi

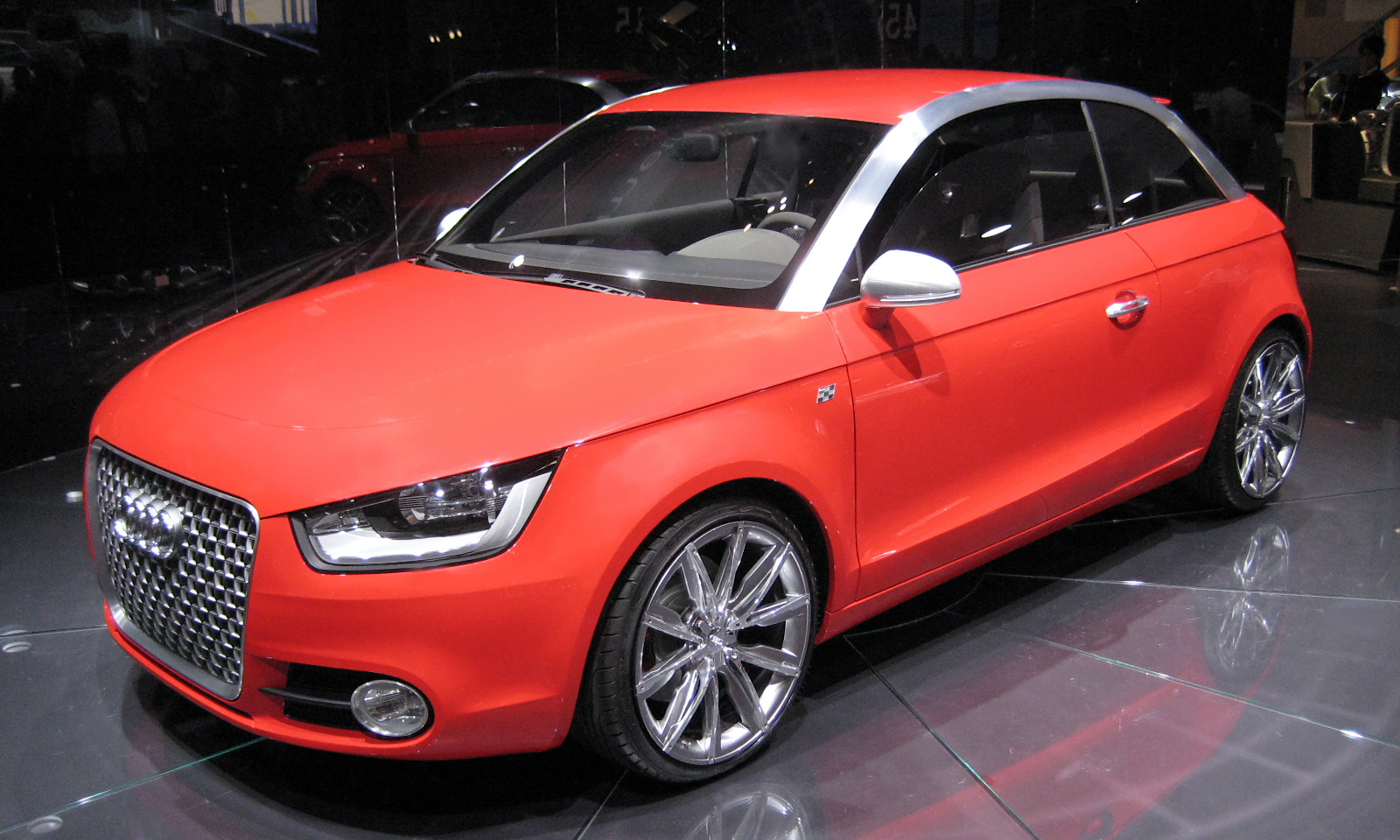
The Audi metroproject quattro, a concept vehicle showcasing Audi hybrid technology

Audi hybrid vehicles are hybrid electric vehicles created by the German carmaker, Audi. Some vehicles listed were concept vehicles, which utilised an internal combustion engine and an electric motor, and were used for research and development (R&D) for potential future use of the technology into possible series production. Audi launched its first hybrid concept car in 1989 called the Audi Duo, and was the first European company to sell a hybrid in 1997, though only in very small numbers.

== Audi Duo ==
The original Audi Duo (styled duo) was created in 1989 and was first shown at the Frankfurt Motor Show, and was based on the Audi C3 100 Avant. It was a petrol engine/electric hybrid concept vehicle. It was powered 100-kilowatt (136 PS; 134 bhp) five-cylinder petrol engine that drove the front wheels, and a part-time electric motor that could be activated when the vehicle was stationary, developing 9-kilowatt (12 PS; 12 bhp) and drove the rear wheels. It used nickel-cadmium batteries.

== Audi 100 Duo II ==
Audi 100 Duo second generation concept car was introduced in 1991. It featured Audi's "trademark" quattro permanent four-wheel drive system. Powered by a four-cylinder 2.0 L engine with 85 kilowatts (116 PS; 114 bhp)), with a 21 kilowatts (29 PS; 28 bhp) electric motor for the rear wheels when required. In electric mode the front axle was disconnected, and in this mode the Duo could reach a claimed top speed of 65 km/h (40.4 mph) and the sodium-sulfur battery sufficient for 80 km (49.71 miles).

== Audi A4 Duo III ==
The Audi Duo III was introduced in 1997, based on the Audi A4 Avant, and was the only Duo to ever make it into series production. The Duo III used the 1.9-litre (120 cu in) Turbocharged Direct Injection (TDI) diesel engine producing 66 kW (90 PS; 89 bhp), which was coupled with a 21 kW (29 PS; 28 bhp) water-cooled electric motor. Both engine and motor powered the front wheels only, unlike the two previous concept Duos. There was a switch inside the cabin for changing between the electric motor and the engine. The batteries would be recharged during highway or country driving, or by plugging the car into an AC power outlet. The electric motor could also recover energy during deceleration and in electric mode the Duo had a range of approximately 50 kilometers (31.07 miles) and a top speed of 80 km/h (49.7 mph).

The hybrid was unable to achieve fuel efficiency much greater than the standard 1.9 TDI, due to the extra weight the lead gelatin batteries added. There was little demand for this hybrid due to its high price, and thus only about 100 Duos were produced. The Duo was the first European hybrid ever put into production and Audi would not sell another hybrid until early 2011.

== Audi Q7 hybrid 4.2 FSI quattro ==
Audi unveiled the Audi Q7 hybrid 4.2 FSI quattro, which uses their Fuel Stratified Injection (FSI) 4.2-litre V8 engine, at the 2005 Frankfurt Motor Show. Audi had planned to have the Q7 hybrid as a part of their 2008 model range, but never did.

== Audi metroproject quattro ==
The metroproject quattro is a supermini/sub-compact, and was shown to the public at the 2007 Tokyo Motor Show. Under the bonnet/hood is a 1.4-litre TSI petrol engine, producing 110 kilowatts (150 PS; 148 bhp). This will distribute its torque of 240 newton-metres (177 lbf⋅ft) to the front wheels via an 'S tronic' Direct-Shift Gearbox. However, in the back of the car, beneath a perspex peephole, is a 30 kilowatts (41 PS; 40 bhp) electric motor which drives the rear axle, and can generate an additional 200 newton-metres (148 lbf⋅ft) of torque, designed to create a zero emissions driving experience in residential or city areas, and increase torque while the 1.4 TSI engine is accelerating.

A lithium-ion battery pack supports a range of up to 100 kilometres (62 mi). In electric mode, the car has a top speed of more than 100 kilometres per hour (62 mph). When both the engine and electric motors are working in unison, the car is transformed into a genuine quattro, with a combined torque output of 440 newton-metres (325 lbf⋅ft) being shared between all four wheels. Stop-start technology will be utilised, as will regenerative braking. As a result, Audi claim a 15% improvement in fuel efficiency when compared to exclusive use of the internal combustion engine.

The A1 started production in 2010 but without a hybrid. There are also no plans to add such later; instead Audi plan an all-electric version.

== Audi Q5 hybrid ==
The Q5 is Audi's first large-scale production hybrid model on sale, first announced at the end of 2010, and sales started during 2011. Powered by a 2.0-litre TFSI turbocharged and direct injected petrol engine, producing 208 bhp, and a 33-kilowatt (45 PS; 44 bhp) electric motor providing a combined total output for the hybrid system is 241 bhp and 354 lb ft. Drive goes to all four wheels, and the gearbox is an eight-speed automatic, but without a torque converter as the electric motor also acts as a starter motor and as a generator. The 1.3 kWh lithium-ion battery sits under the boot floor.

== Other concept models ==
Other Audi hybrid electric vehicles include:

- Audi A1 Hybrid
- Audi A4 TDI concept e

== Other production models ==
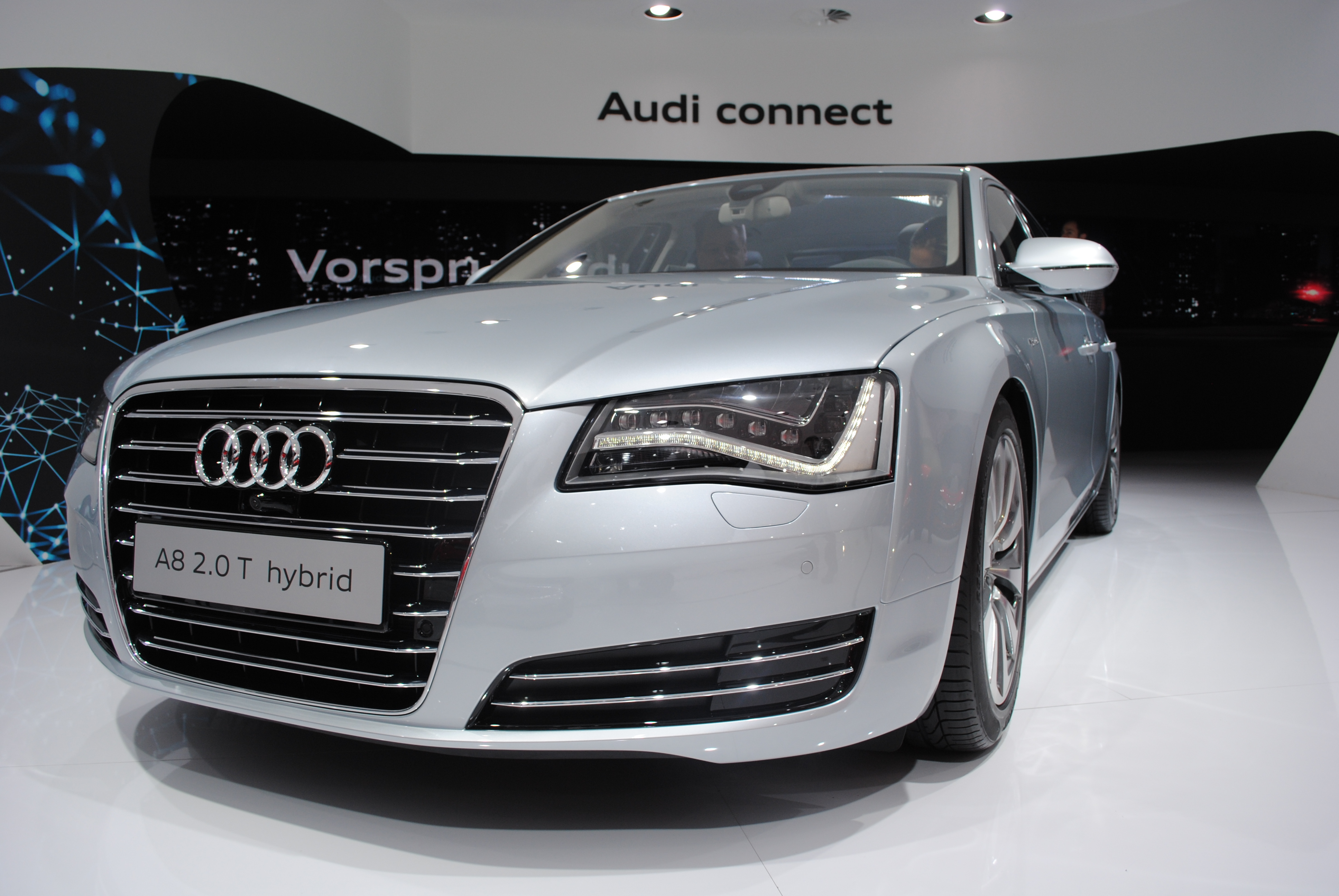
Audi A8 hybrid at the Frankfurt Motor Show in 2011

- Audi A6 hybrid (2011), 2.0 TFSI petrol engine and 53 bhp electric motor, generates a maximum 242 bhp.
- Audi A8 hybrid (2012), 2.0 TFSI petrol engine and 53 bhp electric motor, generates a total 262 bhp

== Audi Q8 ==
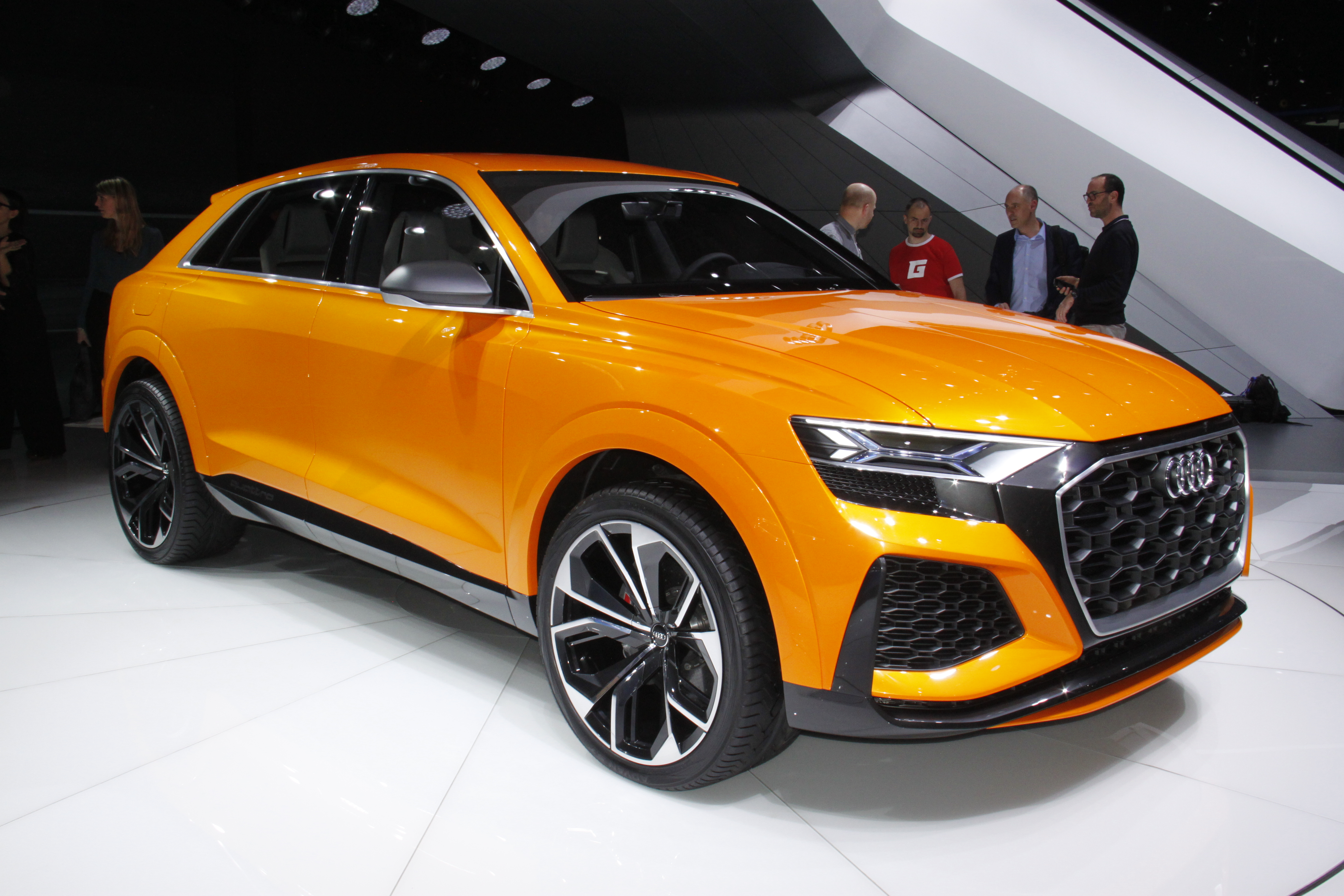
Audi Q8 concept

Audi Q8 Engine 3.0 V6 TFSI (333 h.p.) + E-tron = 448 h.p.

== Batteries ==
Audi is planning an alliance with the Japanese electronic company Sanyo to develop a pilot hybrid project for the Volkswagen Group. The alliance could result in Sanyo batteries and other electronic components being used in future models of the Volkswagen Group.

== See also ==
- List of hybrid vehicles
- Audi e-tron (brand)
