= Nissan Diesel Space Runner A =

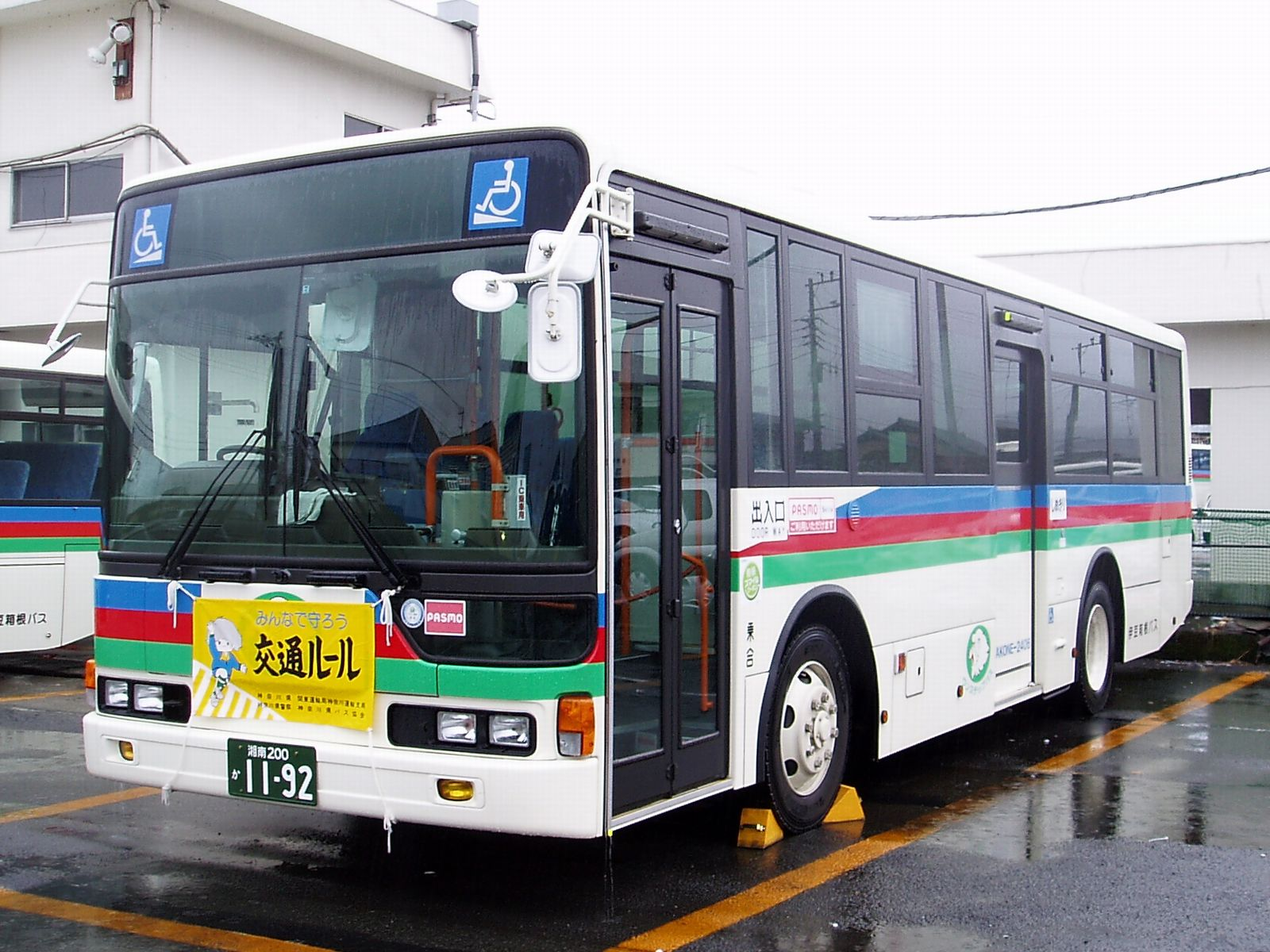

Overview
- Manufacturer: Nissan Diesel
- Production: 2007-2011

Body and chassis
- Class: Complete bus Bus chassis
- Body style: Single-decker bus
- Doors: 1 or 2
- Floor type: Low floor (LKG-); Step-entrance (PKG-/LKG-)

Powertrain
- Engine: MD92TJ, 6M60
- Transmission: 5-speed manual (PKG-); Alison 6-speed automatic (LKG-)

Dimensions
- Wheelbase: 4.8 metre, 5.3 metre, 6.0 metre
- Length: 9.4 metre, 10.1 metre, 10.5 metre
- Width: 2.5 metre
- Height: 3.0 metre

Chronology
- Predecessor: Nissan Diesel Space Runner RA

The Nissan Diesel Space Runner A (日産ディーゼル・スペースランナーA) was a heavy-duty single-decker bus produced by the Japanese manufacturer Nissan Diesel (now: UD Trucks) from 2007 until 2011. It can be either built as a complete bus or a bus chassis.

This is a rebadged Mitsubishi Fuso Aero Star.

The MD92TJ (and 5-speed manual) was adopted for PKG-AP..., and the 6M60 (and Alison 6-speed automatic) was adopted for LKG-AP....

A step-entrance (AP35...) was for both PKG-AP... and LKG-AP..., but a low-floor (AP37...) was only for LKG-AP....

== Nissan Diesel Space Runner RA ==
Nissan Diesel Space Runner RA
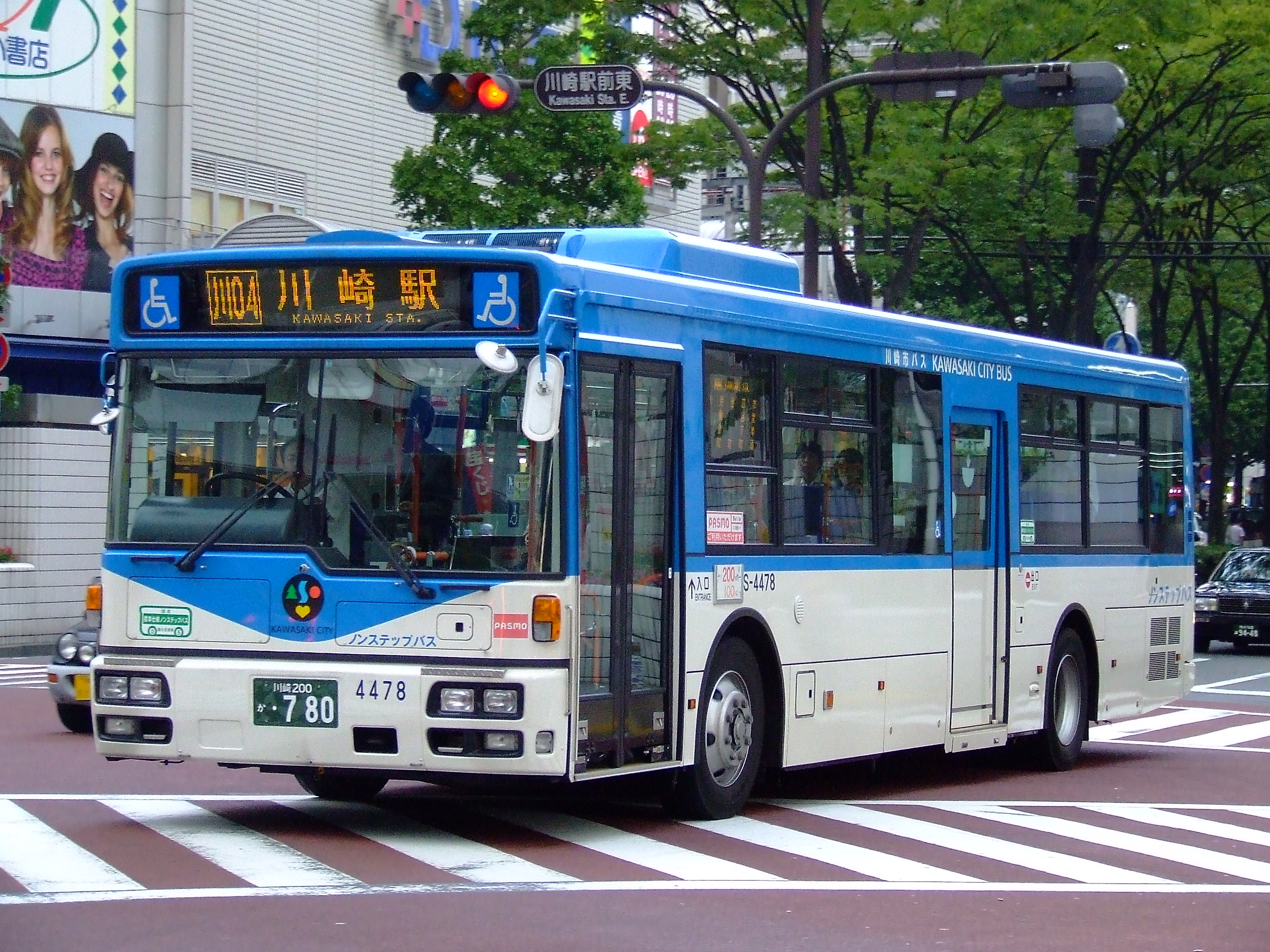

Overview
- Manufacturer: Nissan Diesel
- Production: 2005-2010

Body and chassis
- Class: Complete bus Bus chassis
- Body style: Single-decker bus
- Doors: 1 or 2
- Floor type: Low floor Step-entrance

Powertrain
- Engine: MD92TJ
- Transmission: 5-speed manual 6-speed manual ZF Ecomat 5-speed automatic

Dimensions
- Wheelbase: 4.8 metre, 5.3 metre, 5.8 metre, 6.5 metre
- Length: 9.4 metre, 10.1 metre, 10.5 metre
- Width: 2.5 metre
- Height: 3.0 metre

Chronology
- Predecessor: Nissan Diesel UA
- Successor: Nissan Diesel Space Runner A

The Nissan Diesel Space Runner RA (kana:日産ディーゼル・スペースランナーRA) was a submodel of the Nissan Diesel Space Runner A, produced from 2005 until 2010. It can be either built as a complete bus or a bus chassis. The styling is completely different from the Nissan Diesel UA, that it has a rounded roof dome (more rounded than the UA) and a separately mounted destination sign. The Space Runner RA engine using AdBlue Selective Catalytic Reduction technology.

== Models ==
For Space Runner A:

- PKG-AP35UK/UM/UP (2007)
- LKG-AP35/37FK/FM/FP (2010)

For Space Runner RA:

- ADG-RA273 (2005)
- PKG-RA274/PDG-RA273 (2006)
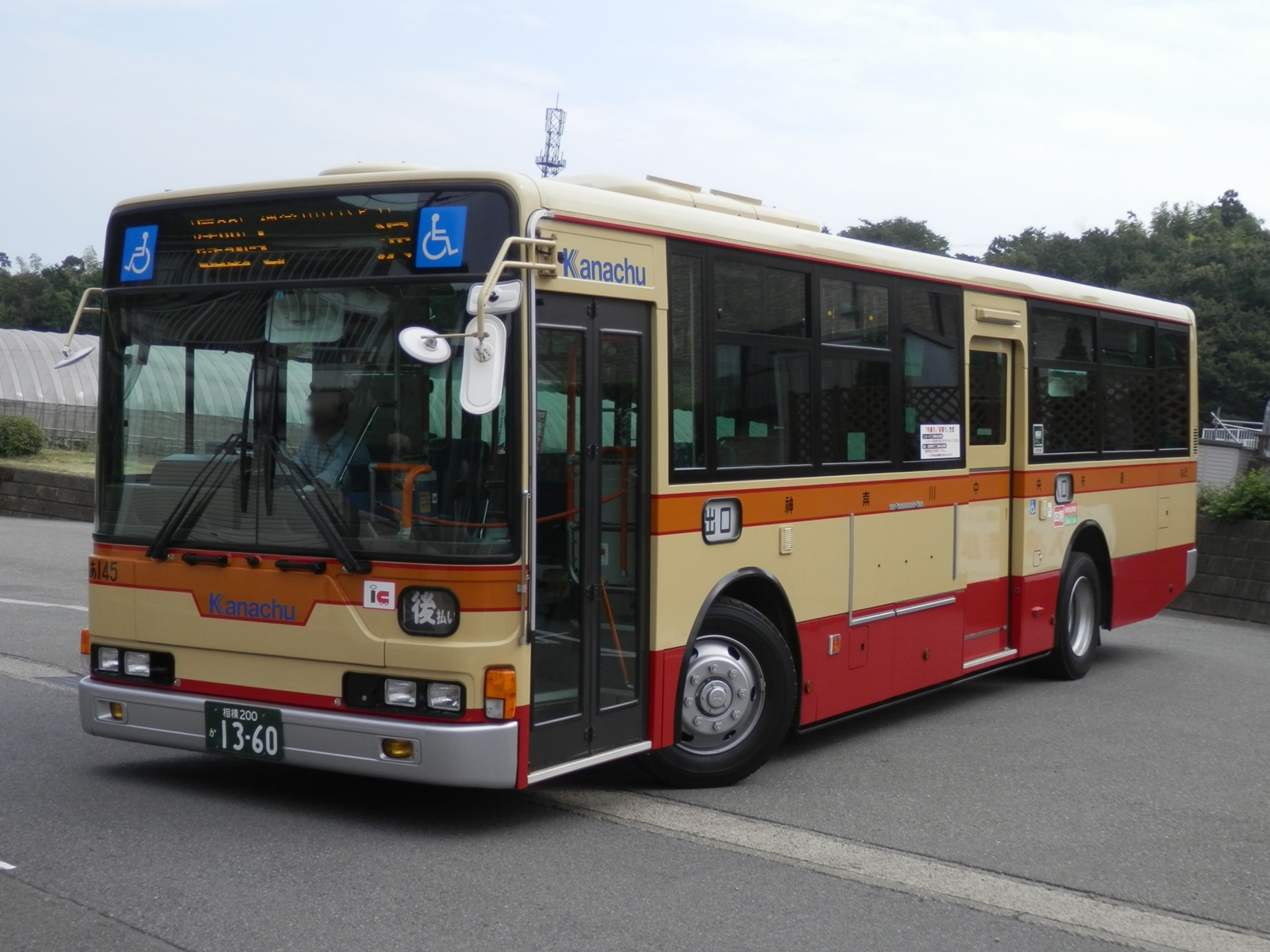
Space Runner A One-Step PKG-AP35UM

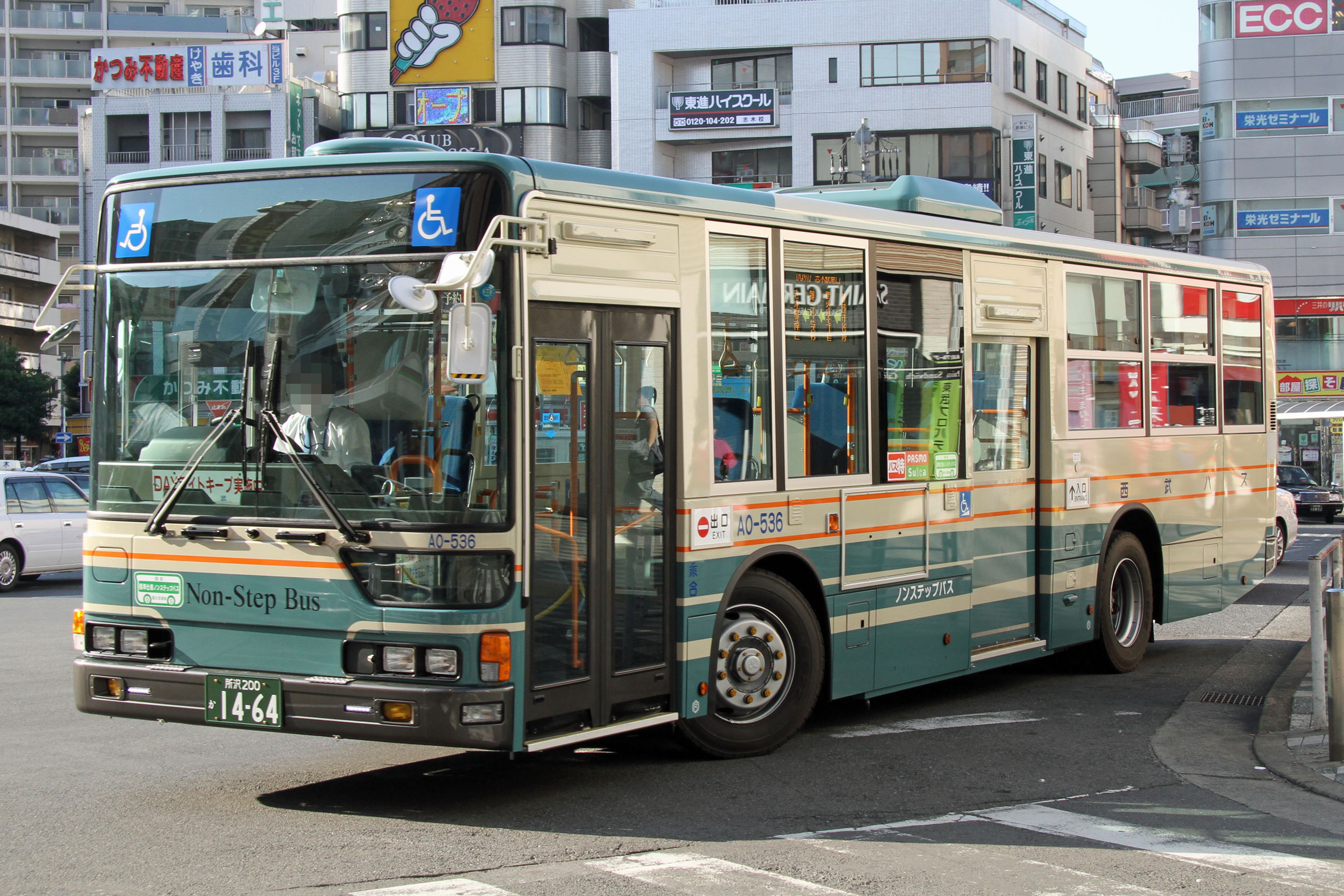
Space Runner A Non-Step LKG-AP37FK

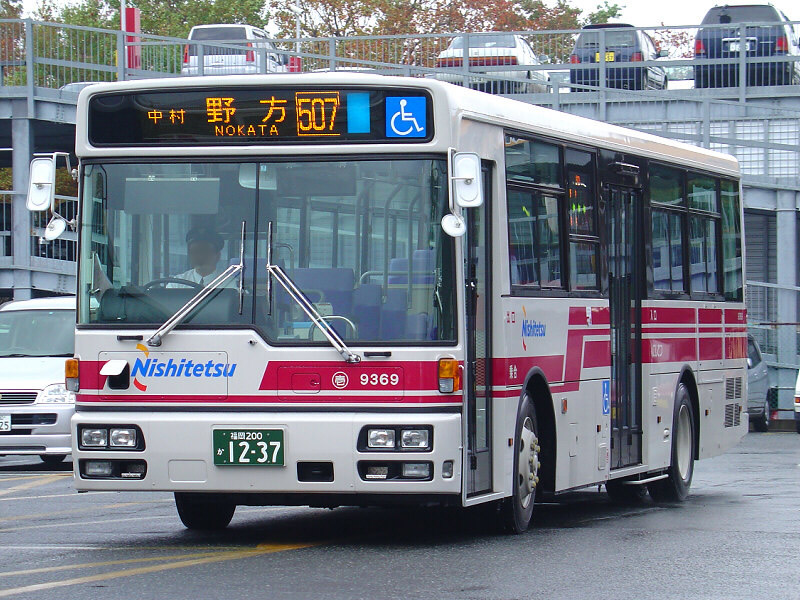
Space Runner RA ADG-RA273MAN

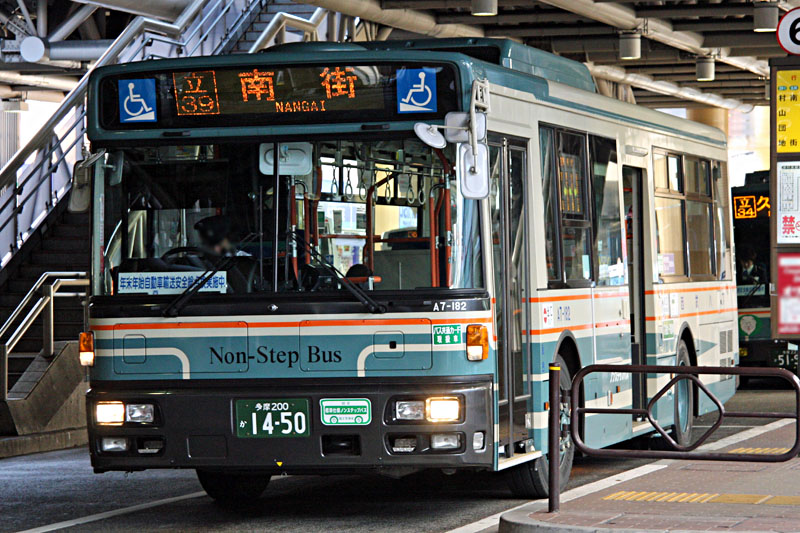
Space Runner RA PKG-RA274KAN

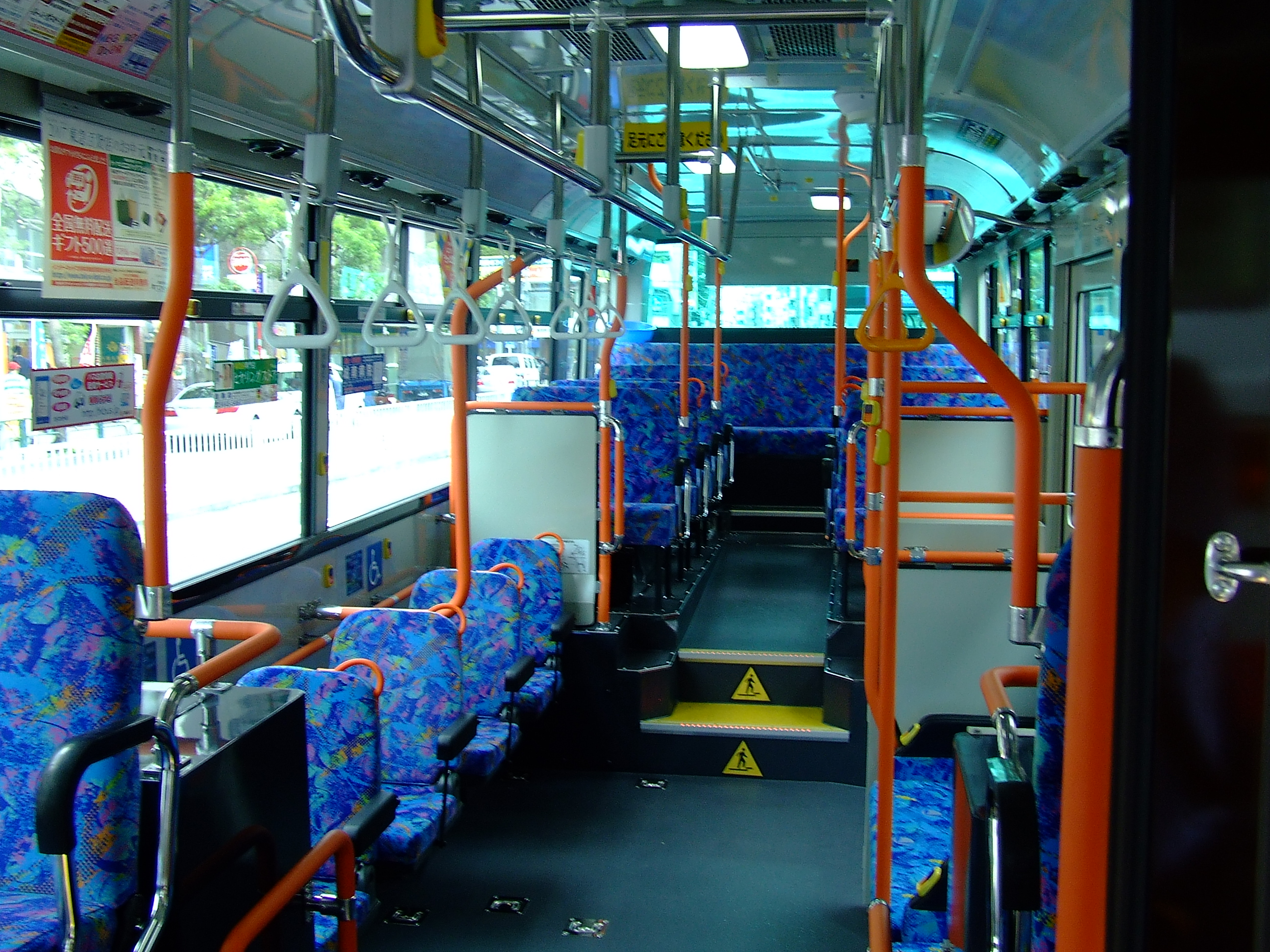
Space Runner RA interior
