= Pieper M1893 =

- Type: Revolving carbine
- Place of origin: Belgium

Service history
- In service: 1896–1920s
- Used by: Cuerpo de Policía Rural
- Wars: Mexican Revolution

Production history
- Designer: Henri Pieper
- Designed: 1893
- Manufacturer: Henri Pieper & Co.
- Produced: 1896–1897
- No. built: >350

Specifications
- Mass: 2.95 kg (6.5 lb)
- Length: 914 mm (36.0 in)
- Barrel length: 502 mm (19.8 in)
- Cartridge: 8x50mm Pieper Carbine
- Action: Double action
- Feed system: 9-rounds cylinder
- Sights: rear adjustable

The Pieper M1893 was a Belgian double-action revolver carbine with a gas-seal system that used the 8mm Pieper cartridge.

== Design and development ==
The development of the M1893 began in the 1890s by Belgian gunsmith Henri Pieper, and a number were purchased for use by the Mexican Rural Police

The first prototypes were designed to use the 7.65 mm Mauser cartridge, however the production copies used the 8mm Pieper cartridge, it had a wooden stock and forend, a double-action system that could be manually cocked, and a 9-round cylinder. The barrel had a 4-line rifling and the rear sight featured a stepped base with a slider adjustable up to 900 meters.

The weapon used a gas seal system similar to that of the Nagant Revolver, in which pulling the trigger cams the cylinder forward on a semi-conical base at the rear of the barrel, forming a gas seal between the cylinder and barrel. The 8mm Pieper cartridge, designed in 1895, featured a brass casing extending beyond the end of the bullet, which further improves the gas seal by inserting the tip of the cartridge slightly into the barrel. The cartridge was produced by the Union Metallic Cartridge Company as early as 1901, and until around 1921 by Remington UMC.
