= Gaselle =

The Gaselle is a hybrid gas/electric vehicle built by Sarabjit Gandhi for Expo 1986 in Vancouver, British Columbia. It was the only car to compete in the World Energy Autocross. Sarabjit drove the car from New York City to Vancouver, a distance of 8050 km in 16 days. The car was hand-built by Sarabjit.

== Engine ==
Sarabjit used the engine from a Honda Goldwing as the gas side of the drivetrain. The engineering of the electrical side is unknown.

== Current status ==
The car is housed in Sarabjit's garage. It still runs.
