= Auto-Mixte =

Automobile manufacturer

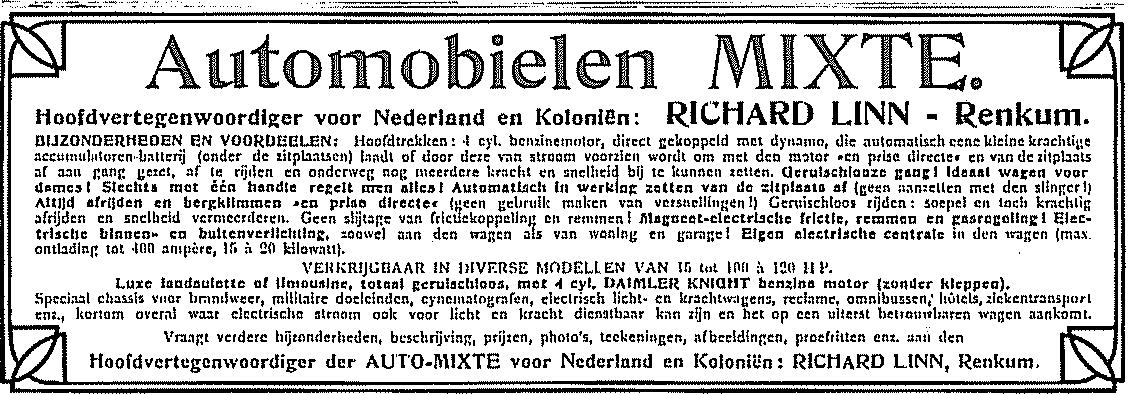
An advert for Auto-Mixte, ca. 1910

Auto-Mixte built cars between 1906 and 1912 using a hybrid-technology under license from Pieper, after Henri Pieper died. From 1912 to 1914 the cars were made as Pescatore, named after the owner. The outbreak of World War I marked the end of the car. The workshop was eventually taken over by a motorcycle manufacturer Gillet Herstal. Auto-Mixte made buses for the City of London as well; one electric engine driving each wheel, therefore creating one single walkway without obstructions.
