= Nissan Diesel UA =

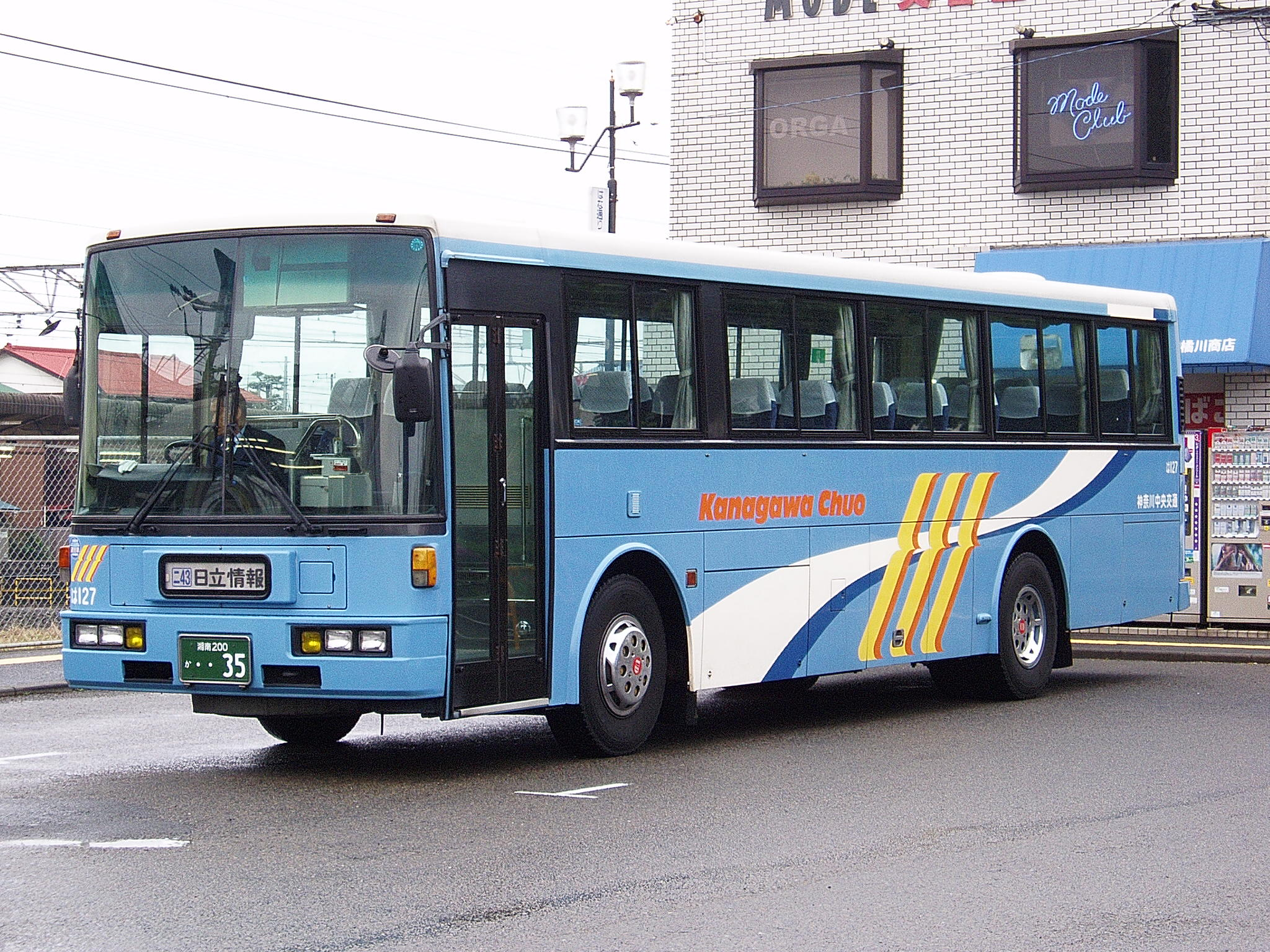

Overview
- Manufacturer: Nissan Diesel
- Production: 1973–2005

Body and chassis
- Class: Complete bus Bus chassis
- Body style: Single-decker bus
- Doors: 1 or 2 doors
- Floor type: Low entry Low floor Step entrance

Powertrain
- Engine: RE8, RF8, PD6, PE6, PF6, PP6, MD92
- Transmission: 5-speed manual 6-speed manual ZF Ecomat 5-speed automatic

Dimensions
- Wheelbase: 4.8 metres, 5.3 metres, 5.8 metres, 6.5 metres
- Length: 11.3 metres or 12.0 metres
- Width: 2.5 metres
- Height: 3.0 metres

Chronology
- Successor: Nissan Diesel Space Runner RA

The Nissan Diesel UA (kana:日産ディーゼル・UA) was a full-size single-decker bus produced by the Japanese manufacturer Nissan Diesel for 32 years of production from 1973 until 2005. It can be built as either a bus chassis or an integral bus. Competitors of the UA include the Isuzu Cubic, Mitsubishi Fuso Aero Star and the Hino Blue Ribbon.

== U/UA (1973-1990) ==
- U/UA20/30 (1973)
- U35 (1975)
- K-U/UA31/36 (1980)
- P-U/UA32 (1984)
- P-U/UA33/50 (1988)
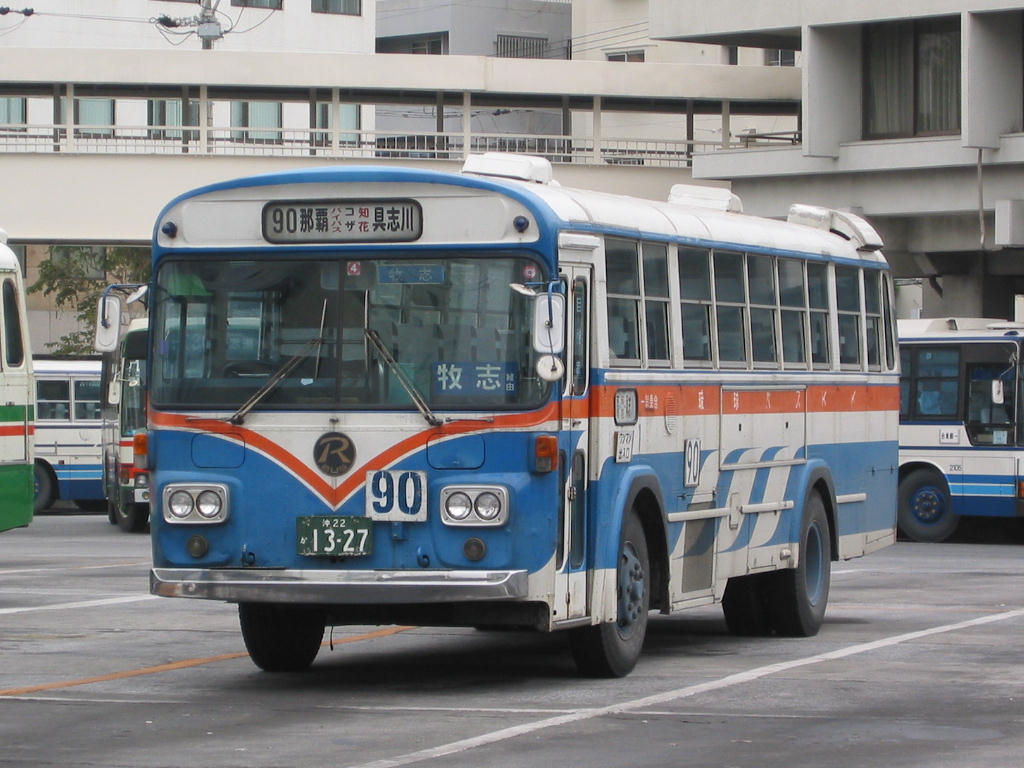
U U20Hkai

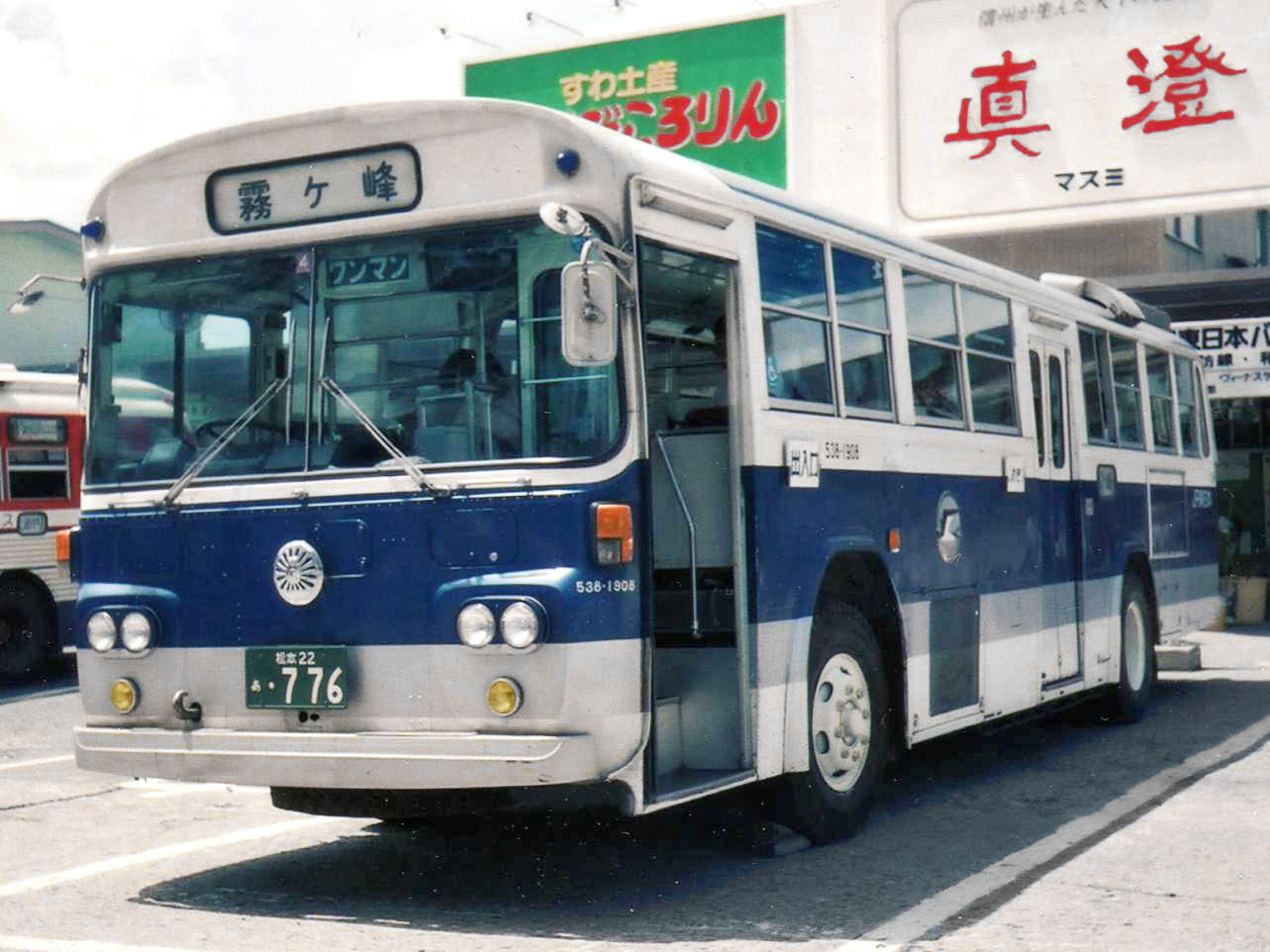
UA K-UA31L

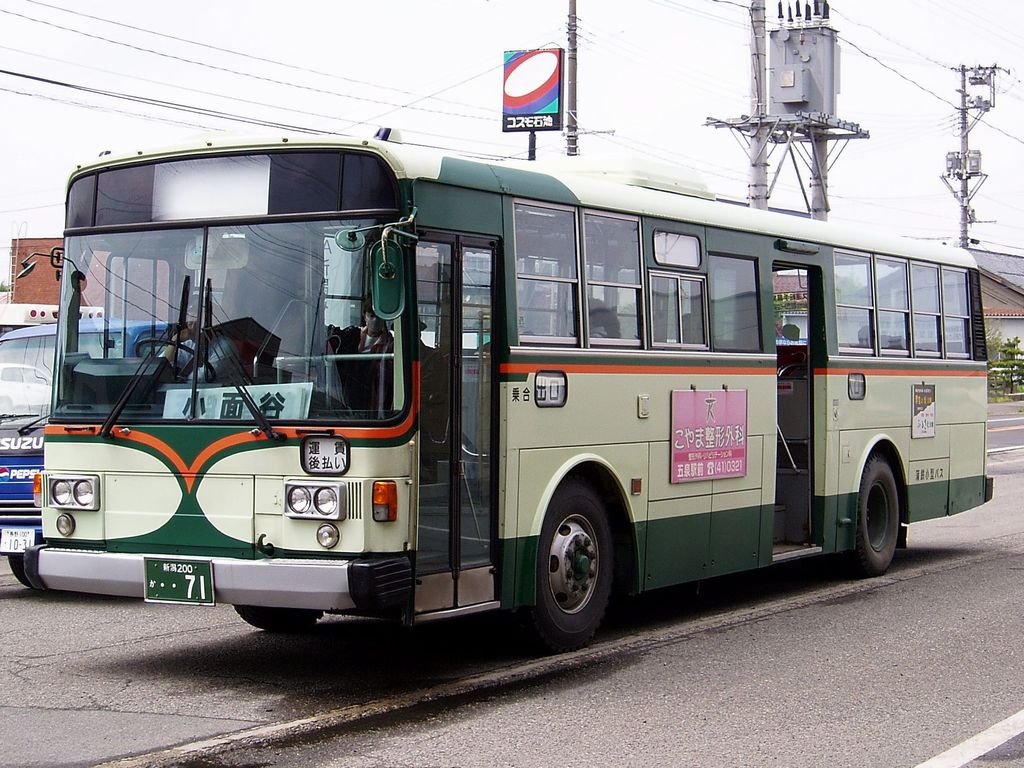
U P-U32L

== UA (1990-2005) ==
One-step and Two-step

- U-UA440/510/520 (1990)
- KC-UA460/521 (1995)
  - KC-UA460HANkai (ERIP Hybrid, 1995)
- NE-UA4E0 (CNG, 1996)
- KL-UA452 (2000)
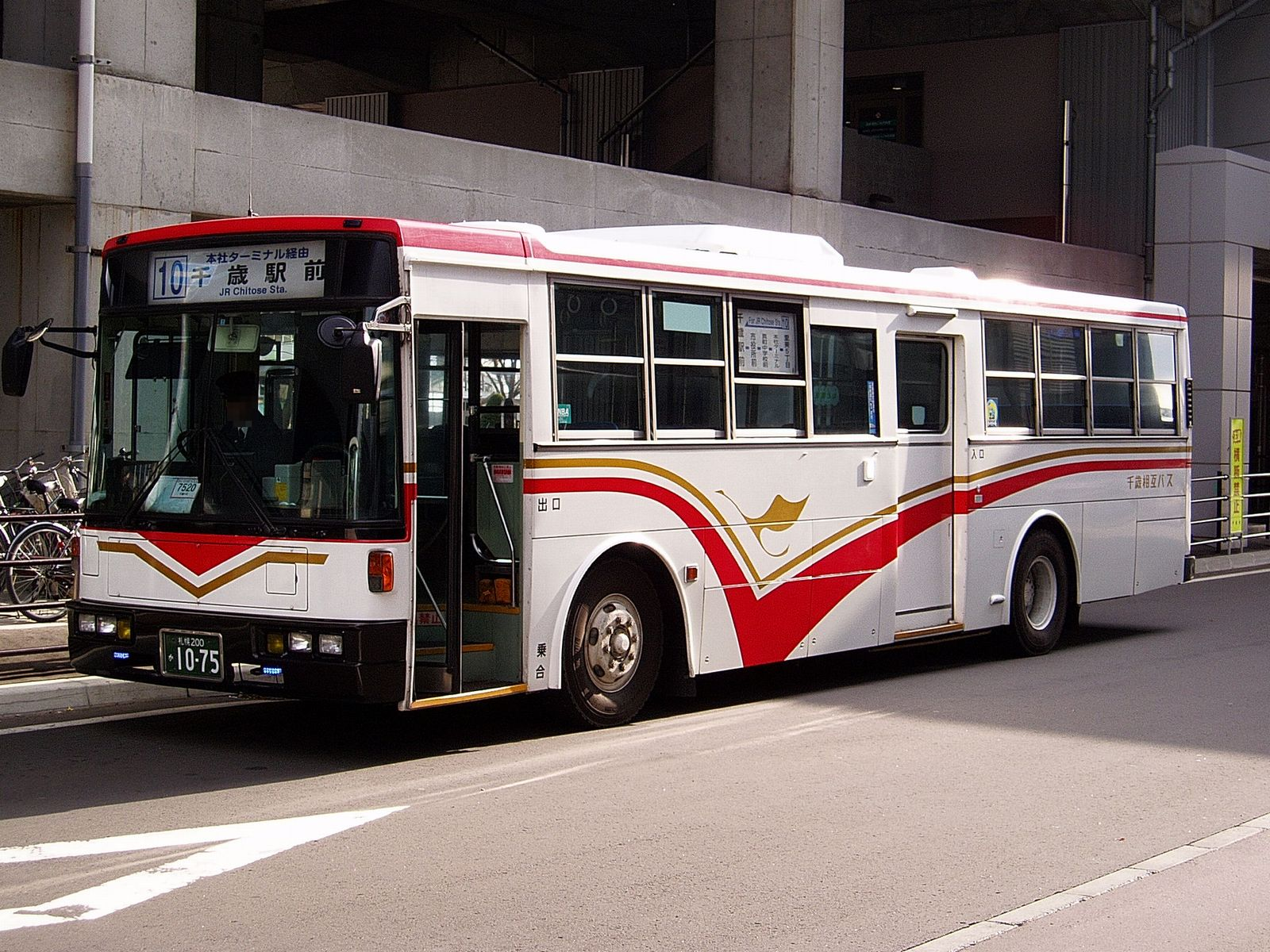
U-UA440NSN

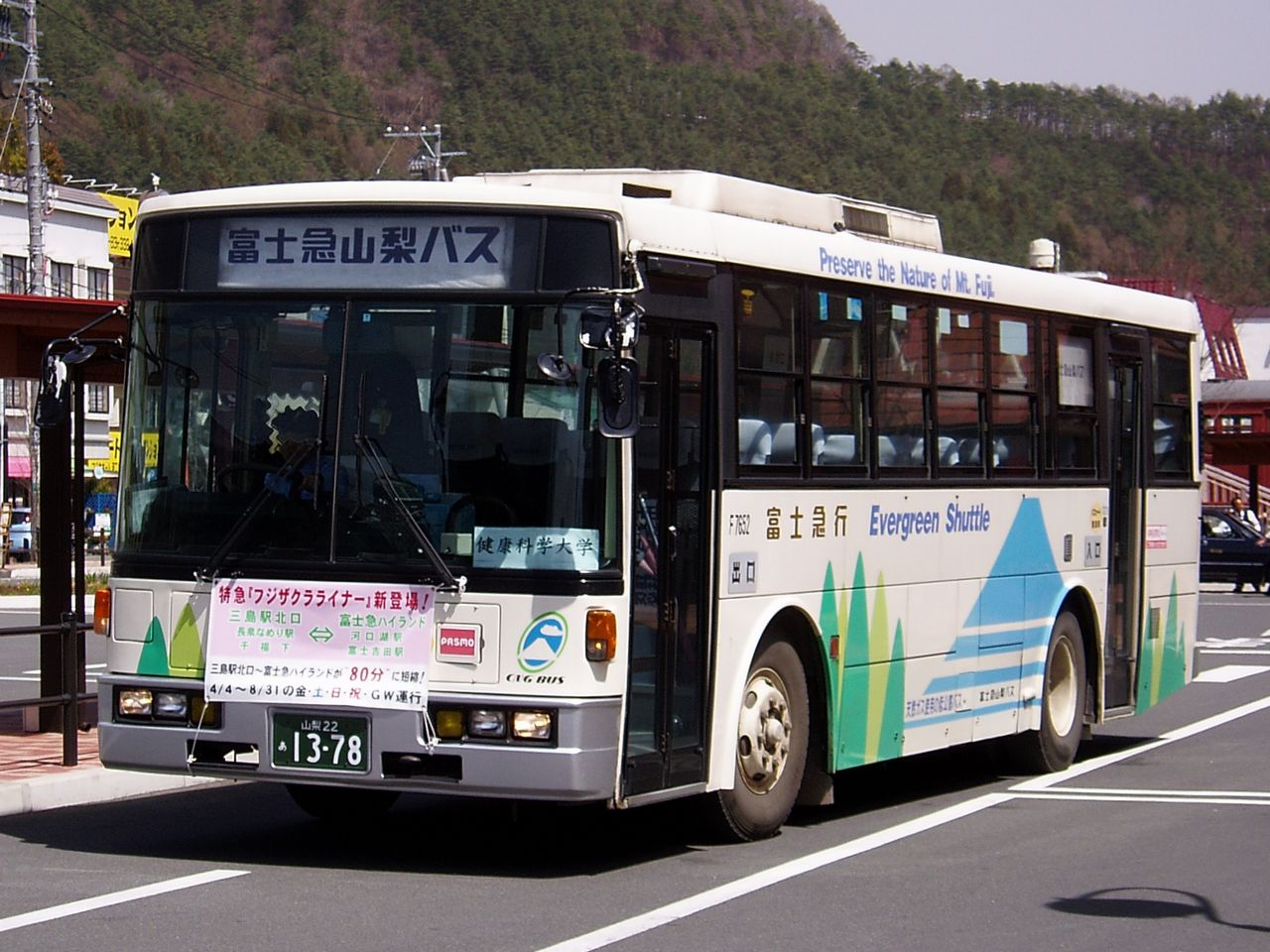
NE-UA4E0HSN (CNG)

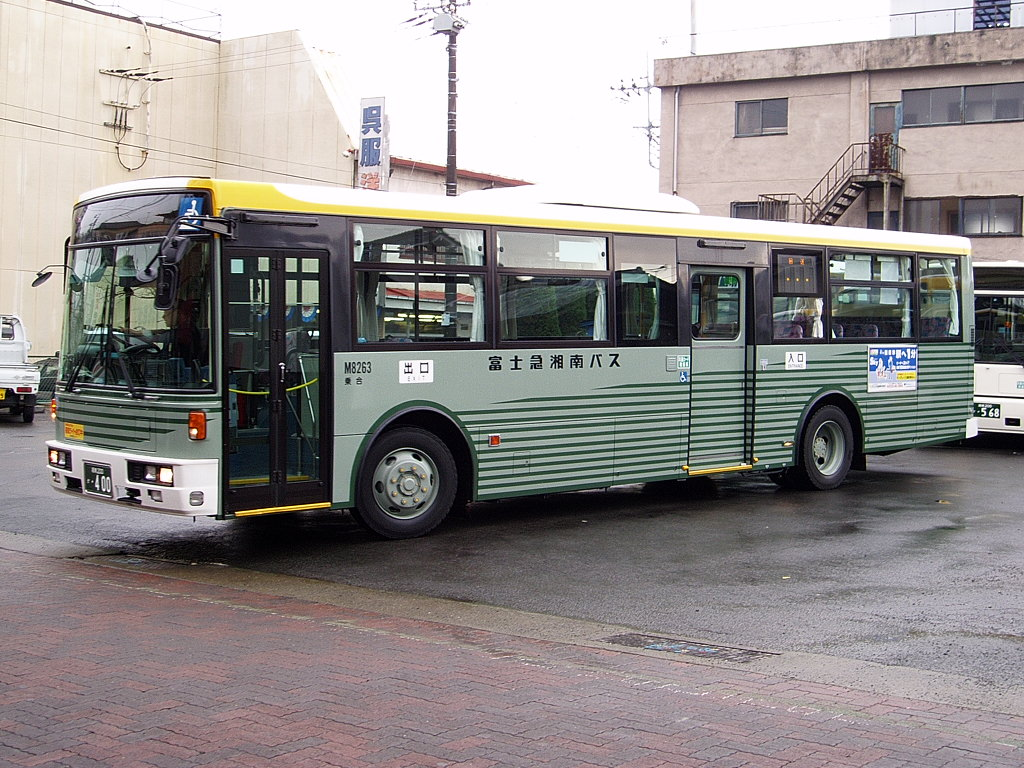
KL-UA452PAN

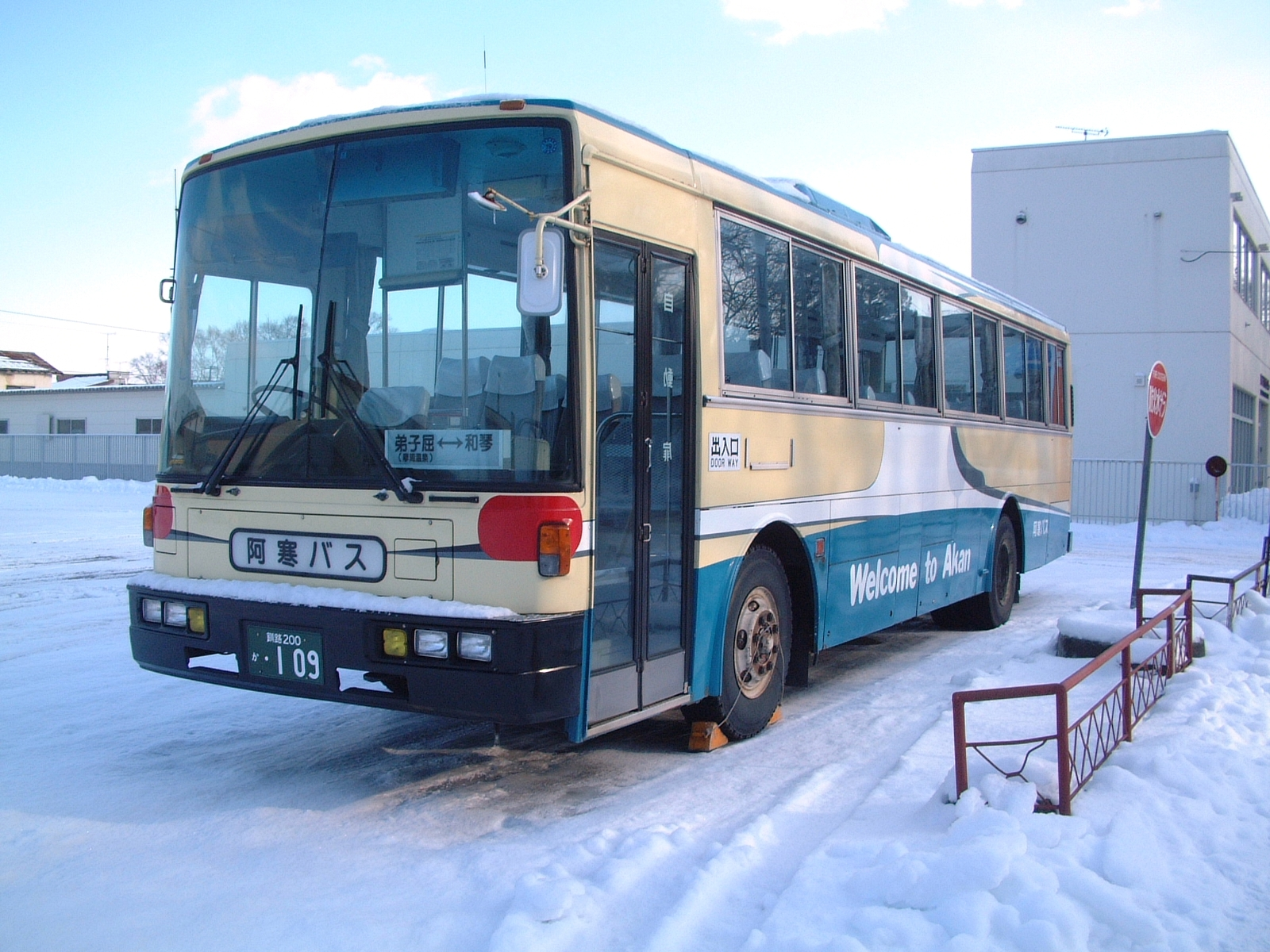
U-UA440LAN

Non-step

The Nissan Diesel UA Non-step is considered as one of the low floor variants, sometimes in other parts of Japan, it is known as a low entry variant. Other low floor models include the Space Runner RA and the Space Runner RM.

- F type
  - UA460KAM (1997)
  - KC-UA460KAM (1998)
  - KL-UA272KAM (2000)
- N type
  - KL-UA272KAM (2003)
- G type
  - KC-UA460 (2000)
  - KL-UA452 (2000)
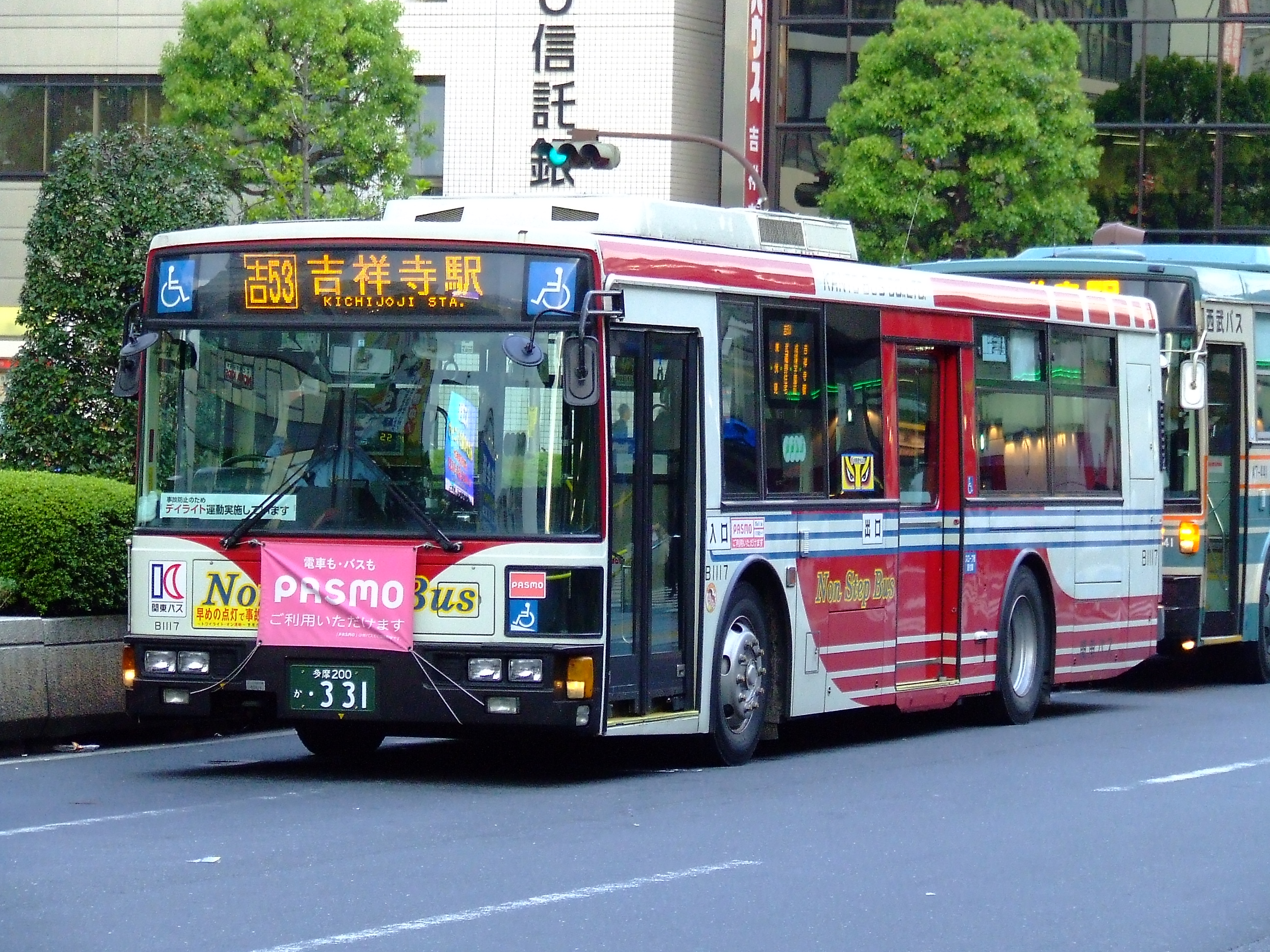
Non-step F type KL-UA272KAM

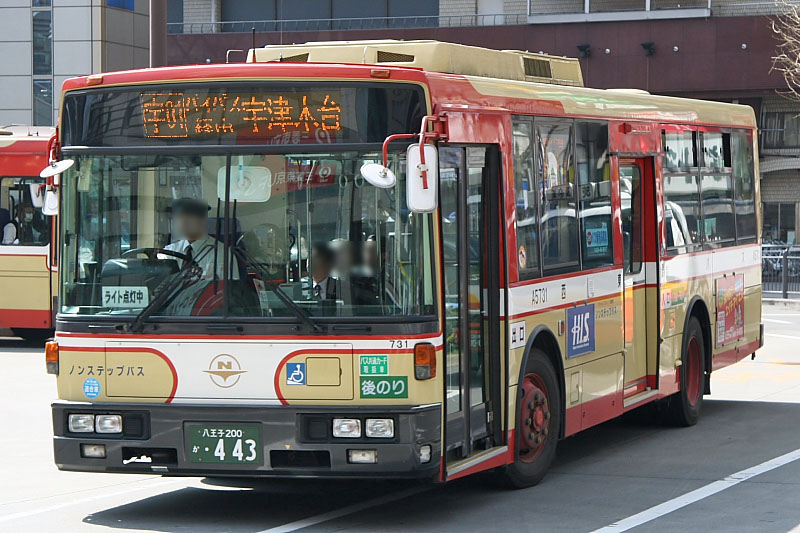
Non-step G type KL-UA452KAN

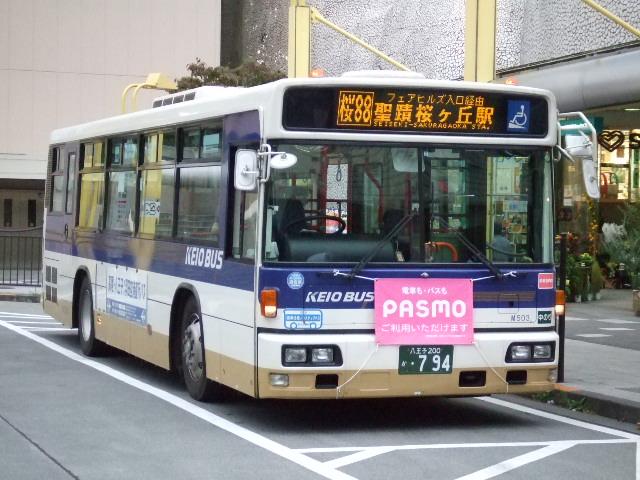
Non-step G type KL-UA452KAN

== See also ==
Other Nissan Diesel low-floor (non-step) bus models sold in Japan:

- Nissan Diesel Space Runner A
- Nissan Diesel Space Runner RA
- Nissan Diesel Space Runner RM
