= Compliance car =

Car explicitly designed to meet government regulations

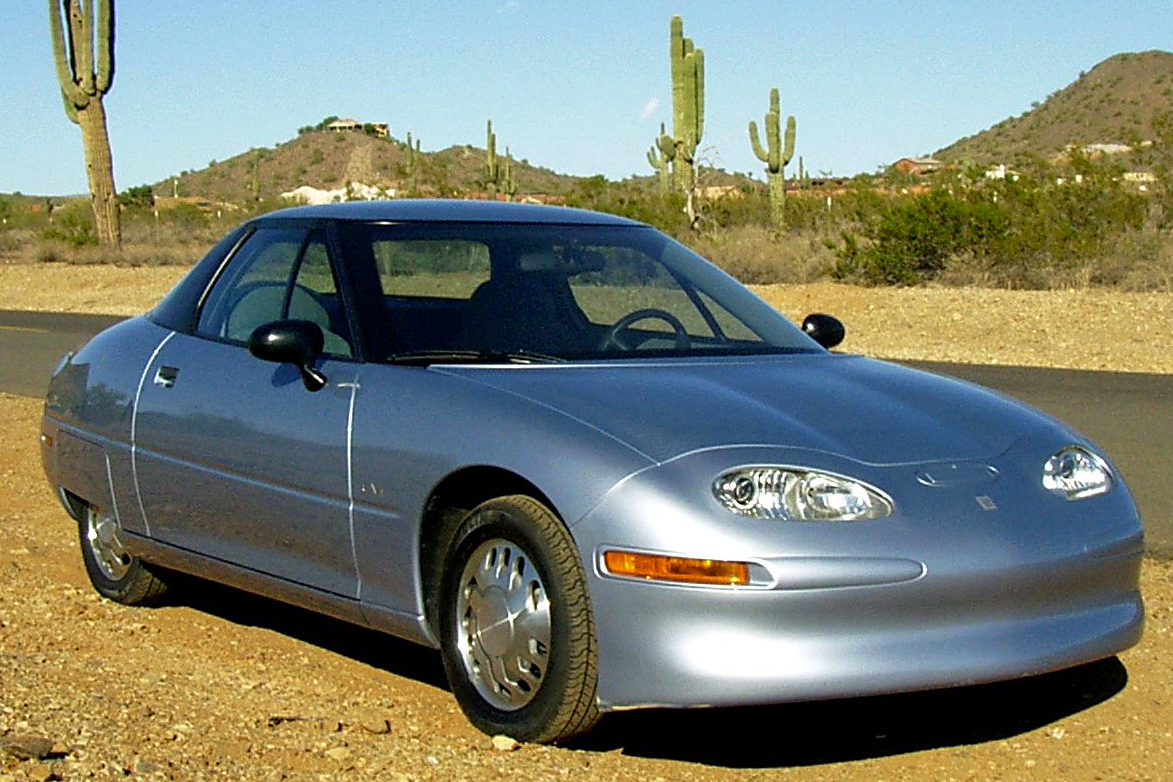
General Motors EV1, the first compliance car in the United States

A compliance car is an electric car or an alternative fuel vehicle that is explicitly designed to meet tightening government regulations for low-emission vehicle sales, while the automobile manufacturer restricts sales to specific jurisdictions to meet the rules, limits production, or both. Some jurisdictions require that automakers offer low or no emission vehicles. A vehicle is considered a "compliance car" if it is clear that the company producing it is only doing so in order to comply with these regulations, rather than viewing them as a source of profit. This is generally identified by low production volume, sales limited to only regions where the law requires it, and low effort design.

While the introduction of compliance cars by the largest car manufacturers is sometimes explained by the companies arguing that they could not manufacture electric cars profitably and sell them for more than their cost to produce them, another mechanism could be behind the auto companies practice of releasing EVs only in limited quantities and in limited markets. They could also be facing the dilemma of the Osborne Effect, wherein sales of a current generation product are damaged when a next generation product is announced. They may also be reluctant to bring them to a wider market as announcing high-quality mass market new EV vehicles will eat into the present sales of the internal combustion engine cars they currently produce in volume, and the exclusive current source of company profits.

== History ==
Legislative authority to add the force of government mandates on automobile manufacturers to increase the penetration of electric and hybrid automobiles into the operating "fleet" of all automobiles have been put in place in several national jurisdictions, notably the United States and Europe.

Although the General Motors EV1 was conceived as an electric vehicle to be built from the ground up in the late 1990s, a significant part of the rationale for designing and producing the "mass-produced" EV was to meet the environmental mandates then coming in the US, initially in California. The EV1 was available in only a few select local markets in the US, was not sold but available only by lease, and few vehicles—less than 1,200—were ever produced, with GM ending production in 1999. The EV1 was therefore a compliance car, albeit an innovative one that was much loved by customers. GM lobbied to get the early government mandate killed, and they were successful; GM then shut down the EV1 program by 2002 and recalled all leased vehicles by February 2002.

By 2012, the state of California—through legislative authority given to the California Air Resources Board (CARB)—successfully promulgated long-term regulations to require the six most popular automakers in the state (Honda, GM, Toyota, Nissan, Ford and Chrysler) to offer a zero-emissions vehicle ZEV. Failure to do so would result in losing the ability to sell any car in the region." This led to the introduction of several compliance cars that were designed specifically to meet the CARB requirements, but were not intended for the broader US market, nor to be produced and sold in quantities that would meet demand for such vehicles in the open market, where no such government rules exist:

- Chevrolet Spark EV
- Fiat 500e
- Ford Focus Electric
- Honda Fit EV
- Mazda MX-30
- Toyota RAV4 EV
- Subaru Crosstrek PHEV

A few other states passed similar rules, adopting the California requirements; but most states have not chosen to mandate the production of electric vehicles.

Trade publication Autoguide reported in 2014 that "automakers are wary of the term 'compliance car' despite the fact that these cars exist for the sole purpose of being compliant with the rules set out by CARB regulators." Fiat CEO Sergio Marchionne has been more clear, having disclosed in 2014 that their compliance car was unprofitable, with Fiat losing US$14,000 per unit on the limited production Fiat 500e, and that Fiat "only wanted to sell the absolute minimum necessary to meet regulations." Fiat had previously stated that they would not invest heavily in EV development beyond compliance vehicles.

Other EVs have been designed from the ground up, and are widely distributed; for example the Chevrolet Bolt EV and Nissan Leaf, and the Bolt and Leaf are therefore not considered a compliance car.

By 2016, a total of 12 states had adopted similar rules the CARB mandate. The State of California had by then specified that 15.4% of an automaker's fleet must comply with ZEV rules by 2025.

By 2019, both Hyundai and Kia had introduced electric vehicles—Hyundai Kona Electric, Hyundai Ioniq Electric, Kia Niro EV, and Kia Soul EV—but the manufacturers are opting to sell these models only is a few states, and total production of all four models was to be limited to less than 20,000 units per year, for both 2019 and 2020. This compares to Tesla's sales of nearly 140,000 sales in the United States for just one model in 2018, the Tesla Model 3, and Chevrolet's production of 17,000 units for just one model, the Chevrolet Bolt. Hyundai and Kia resist calling their cars compliance cars simply because their production number projections are larger than the minimum required by the California mandate; further, Kia stated that they are selling the cars in three states beyond the ZEV-compliance states. Hyundai also sold 10,000 EVs in Korea during 2018. Auto analysts still consider the cars compliance cars because of the low production and limited distribution, not something a manufacturer would choose to do if they believed they could profitably sell their compliant EVs in volume at the prices they are offering them.

In August 2022, the California Air Resources Board adopted the Advanced Clean Cars II regulations, which were intended to replace the earlier program beginning with the 2026 model year. The regulations established progressively increasing zero-emission-vehicle requirements, beginning at 35 percent of new light-duty vehicle sales for the 2026 model year and reaching 100 percent by 2035.

By May 2025, California and twelve other jurisdictions, including the District of Columbia, had adopted Advanced Clean Cars II, although implementation dates differed. Some participating states subsequently delayed enforcement or reconsidered their participation.

In June 2025, President Donald Trump signed congressional resolutions seeking to overturn the federal waivers that authorized California to enforce Advanced Clean Cars II and related vehicle-emissions programs. California and ten other states challenged the federal action in court.

The federal action created uncertainty over the enforceability of the Advanced Clean Cars II requirements. California subsequently readopted standards based on its earlier Advanced Clean Cars program while developing a proposed successor called the Drive Forward program.

== Description and limitations ==
Many compliance cars are limited in their quantities, options, and availability to purchase.

Both Nissan and Tesla introduced cars before 2014 that were designed to be electric from the ground up, and have no limitations on either production or ownership, and make their electric vehicles available in all 50 US states. Their EVs thus avoided the term compliance car, despite easily meeting all requirements of the CARB regulations.
