= Anciens Etablissements Pieper =

Belgian arms manufacturer

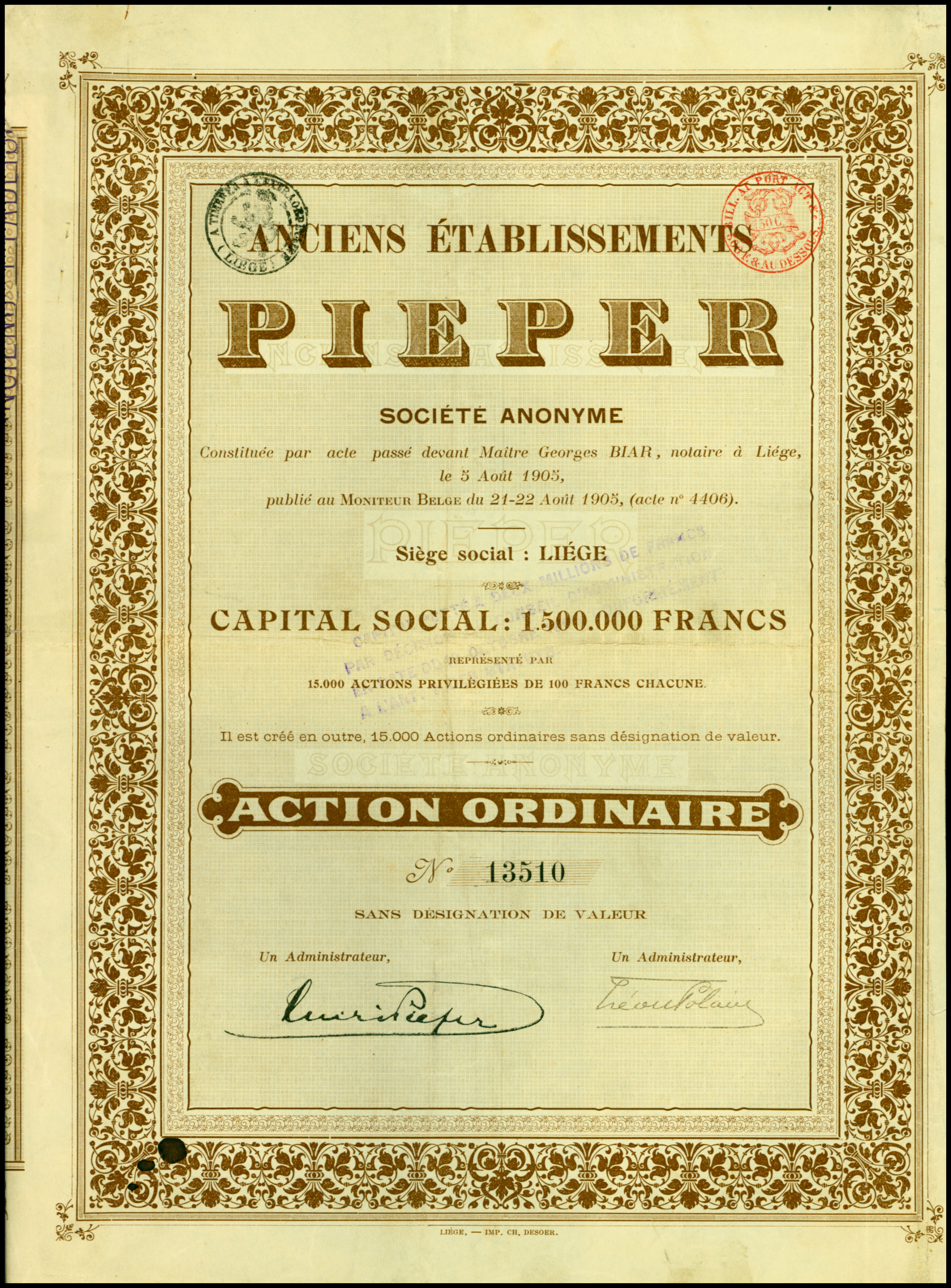
Share of the Anciens Établissements Pieper SA, issued 1905

Anciens Etablissements Pieper was a Belgian arms manufacturer established under the name Henri Pieper in Herstal, Belgium in 1884 (some sources, 1866), by Henri Pieper. In 1898, it was renamed to Nicolas Pieper, and it became the Anciens Etablissements Pieper in 1905. It stayed in business until approximately 1950. The company used the Bayard trade name (after the legendary horse of Renaud de Montauban) and manufactured the 1888 Henri-Pieper rifle, the Pieper M1893 carbine, the Bergmann–Bayard pistol and the Bayard 1908 pistol. The company also produced a small pistol with a tip-up barrel ("basculant") to facilitate loading.

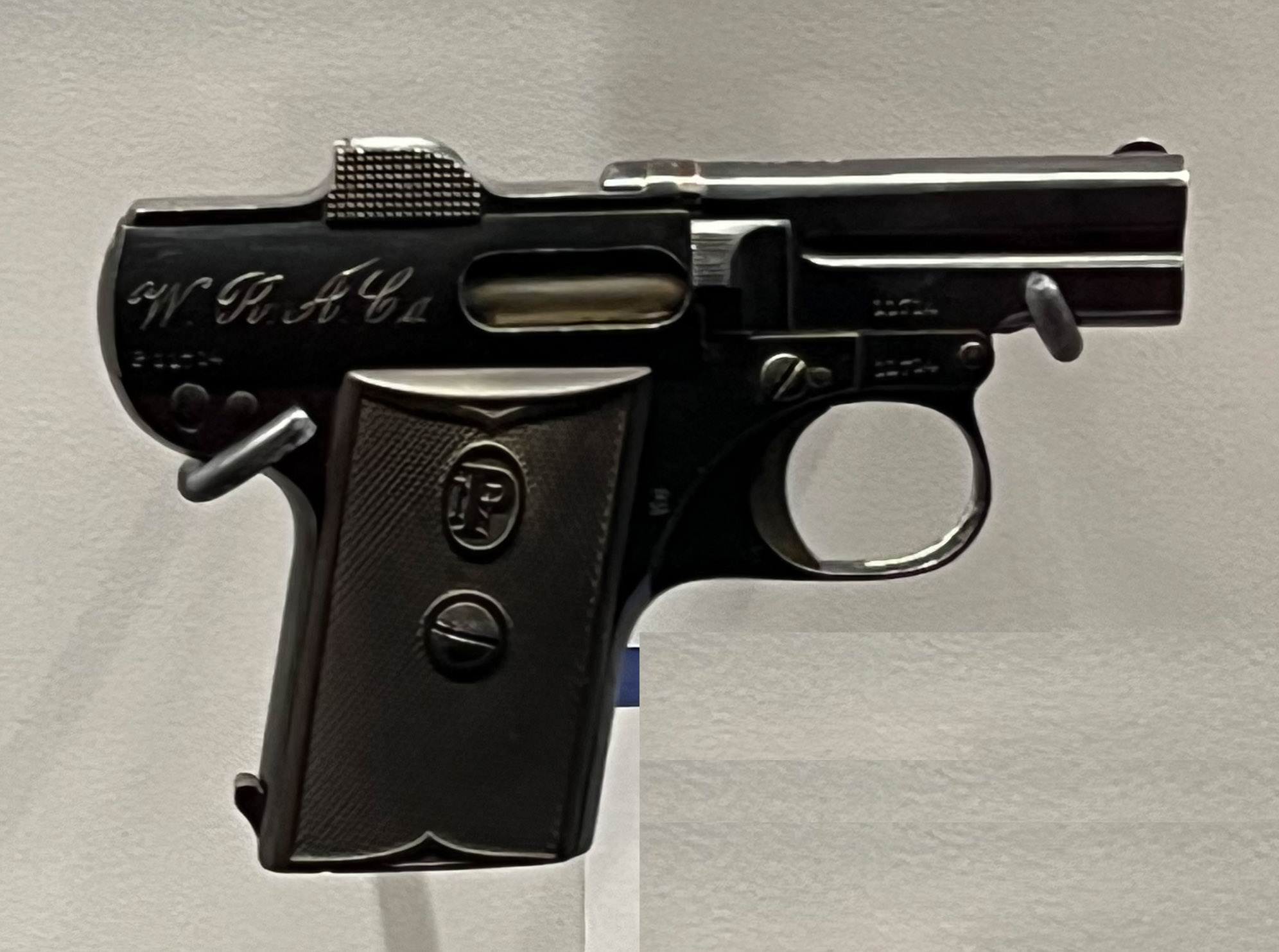
N. Pieper 1908 Model "basculant" pistol, 6.35mm, on display at the Cody Firearms Museum, Buffalo Bill Center of the West, Cody, Wyoming.

== Pieper ==
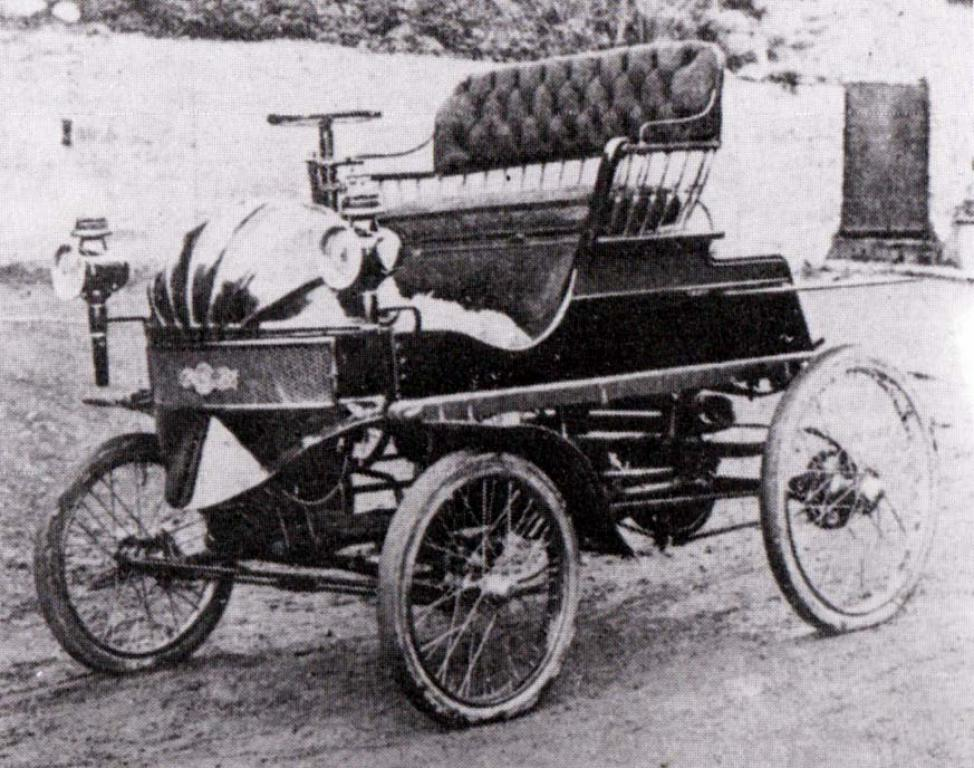
Pieper petrol-electric car

From 1897, the company also produced cars. In 1900, Henri Pieper introduced a hybrid vehicle with an electric motor/generator, batteries, and a small gasoline engine. It used the electric motor to charge its batteries at cruise speed and used both motors to accelerate or climb a hill. The Pieper factory was taken over by Impéria, after Pieper died.

Auto-Mixte, also of Belgium, built vehicles from 1906 to 1912 under the Pieper patents.
