= Fuso Trucks America =

American regional subsidiary of Mitsubishi Fuso

Mitsubishi Fuso Truck of America, Inc.
- Type: Wholly owned subsidiary
- Industry: Transportation
- Founded: 1985
- Headquarters: Logan Township, New Jersey, U.S.
- Number of locations: 201 dealers across the U.S. (Incl. Puerto Rico and Guam) and Canada, as of 15 November 2013
- Area served: United States and Canada
- Key people: Jecka Glasman (President and CEO); Dr. Michael Munz (Chief Financial Officer); Bill Lyons (VP Sales Operations)
- Products: Commercial work trucks (Class 3 through Class 5; until 2021)
- Services: Dealer service training
- Owners: Mitsubishi Fuso
- Parent: Daimler Truck (89.29%); Mitsubishi Group (10.71%)
- Subsidiaries: Mitsubishi Fuso Truck of Canada
- Website: http://www.mitfuso.com

Mitsubishi Fuso Truck of America, Inc. (MFTA) is a wholly owned subsidiary of Mitsubishi Fuso Truck and Bus Corporation (MFTBC), Kawasaki, Japan, itself a part of Daimler Truck based in Logan Township, New Jersey, United States. MFTA imported and marketed Class 3 through Class 5 medium-duty cabover trucks through more than 200 dealer locations in the United States (including Puerto Rico and Guam) and Canada, until 2021. As of 2019, MFTA imported and marketed diesel-powered, gas-powered, and electric trucks. According to the company, more than 100,000 Mitsubishi Fuso standard, 4-wheel-drive and crew cab trucks had been sold in the Canadian and U.S. markets since the company's founding. Applications included beverage, catering, refrigerated and dry cargo delivery, vehicle recovery, towing, pest control, plumbing, light construction and landscaping, overlanding, among others.

== Company history ==
Established in 1985, MFTA signed its first dealer and sold its first truck in the U.S. in 1986. By the end of that year, the company had enlisted 41 dealers and had total retail sales of 89 trucks.

In 1990, the company introduced its FG model 4-wheel-drive cabover into the North American market. The company expanded operations into Canada in 1999, and sold its 60,000th truck in the North American market in 2001. In 2002 MFTA introduced its FE145 Crew Cab model, followed by redesigned FE and FG models in 2004. By 2005, the company had sold 80,000 trucks and added a 5-year powertrain limited warranty covering all of its models.

In September 2009, the company signed its 200th dealer (Washington Auto Carriage, Spokane, WA). Shortly after, with 175 dealers operating in the U.S. and 25 operating in Canada, it signed a new dealership agreement that expanded its reach into Puerto Rico for the first time. On December 30, 2009, the company sold its 100,000th truck in North America to LaVallee's Bakery Distributors, Waltham, MA.

In March 2011, MFTA introduced a new line of Class 3 through Class 5 medium duty commercial trucks to the North American market, designated the Canter FE/FG Series. For the first time, the parent company (MFTBC) applied the name Canter—the model name used throughout the rest of the world—to its line of light medium-duty trucks marketed in the NAFTA region.

MFTA expanded its dealer network again in November 2013, when it signed an agreement with a dealership on the island of Guam.

In March 2014, the company introduced a new Class 3 model, the Fuso Canter FE130, with a gross vehicle weight rating (GVWR) of 13,200 lb., 6% higher than the 12,500 lb. GVWR of the FE125 model it replaced.

In May 2020, Daimler Trucks announced its decision to stop selling the Mitsubishi Fuso brand in North America, citing its failure to gain significant market share in the prior decades. The brand's 137 remaining dealerships would move on to focus on sales of parts, maintenance, and the completion of warranty-related repairs through 2028.

== Models ==
MFTA offered the following models for sale in the United States, Canada, Puerto Rico and Guam:

- Canter FE130 Diesel: Class 3 cabover work truck with GVWR of 13,200 lb.
- Canter FE140 Gas: Class 4 cabover work truck with GVWR of 14,500 lb.
- Canter FE160 Diesel: Class 4 cabover work truck with GVWR of 15,995 lb.
- Canter FE160 Gas: Class 4 cabover work truck with GVWR of 15,995 lb.
- Canter FE160CC Diesel: Class 4 cabover work truck with 7-passenger crew cab and GVWR of 15,995 lb.
- Canter FE160CC Gas: Class 4 cabover work truck with 7-passenger crew cab and GVWR of 15,995 lb.
- Canter FE180 Diesel: Class 5 cabover work truck with GVWR of 17,995 lb.
- Canter FE180 Gas: Class 5 cabover work truck with GVWR of 17,995 lb.
- Canter FG4X4 Diesel: Class 4 4-wheel-drive cabover work truck with GVWR of 14,050 lb. (discontinued in 2020)
- eCanter: Battery electric work truck with GVWR of 15,995 lb.

== Engines/transmissions ==
=== FE and FG models ===
Since 2010 or 2012, all Diesel models of the company's Canter FE and FG models use the same basic Fuso 4P10 model 3.0L (183.0 cu.in.) dual overhead cam (DOHC), 4-stroke, water-cooled, turbocharged, intercooled diesel engine with four valves per cylinder. Engine output on all Canter FE/FG Series diesel models, according to the company's published specifications, was 161 HP @ 3500 rpm and 295 lb-ft of torque @ 1600 rpm.

All models except the Gas engine came standard with a Mitsubishi Fuso DUONIC™ electronic 6-speed Dual clutch transmission (DCT) with overdrive. The Canter FG4X4 also came standard with on demand four-wheel drive and reduction gear in a heavy-duty transfer case. Emissions control to meet the 2010 EPA standards was provided by Daimler Truck's BlueTec system.

Gasoline engine units were powered by a GM Powertrain 6.0-liter Vortec V8 mated to an Allison 1000 six-speed automatic gearbox. Notably, because of the Allison transmission, these trucks were the only gasoline-powered cab forward trucks to be offered with a PTO provision. Development of these trucks began in 2017, with initial deliveries taking place in late 2018.

All of the Canter models had a 12,000-mile service interval (oil changes/routine maintenance) as standard.

=== FK and FM models ===
Over the previous decade, the company also offered Class 6 and Class 7 medium-duty work trucks. Three models were generally available:

- FK200: Class 6 cabover work truck with GVWR of 19,850 lb.
- FK260: Class 6 cabover work truck with GVWR of 25,995 lb.
- FM330: Class 7 cabover work truck with GVWR of 32,900 lb.

FK and FM model Fusos were powered by a Mitsubishi 6M60 model 7.5L (460 cu.in.) single overhead cam (SOHC) in-line 6-cylinder water-cooled, turbocharged, intercooled diesel engine with four valves per cylinder. Engine output on all FK and FM models was 243 HP @ 2600 rpm and 516 lb.-ft. of torque at 1400 rpm.

All FK and FM models were mated to Allison 5-speed (FK200/FK260) or 6-speed (FM330) electronic overdrive automatic transmissions, as standard. A Mitsubishi 6-speed OD manual transmission was available on the FK260 model; a Mitsubishi 6-speed direct manual transmission was an option on the FK330 model.

== Primary competitors ==
All Mitsubishi Fuso trucks were of the low-cab-over-engine (LCOE) configuration, also known as low-cab-forward (LCF), or simply as cabovers. Consequently, the company's primary competitors in the North American market were other manufacturers/marketers of medium-duty cabover trucks; namely: Isuzu Commercial Truck of America, a subsidiary of Isuzu and Hino Trucks USA, a subsidiary of Hino Motors. Historically, the company also competed with GMC Medium Duty cab over trucks, but as of July 31, 2009, GM closed the plant that manufactured its medium-duty commercial trucks, including its cab over models, and announced it was withdrawing from the medium-duty commercial truck market. The same GM plant also manufactured Isuzu class 6 and class 7 models and Isuzu class 3 gasoline-engine cabover models. In 2016, GM once again partnered with Isuzu to reintroduce the Chevrolet Low Cab Forward as a direct competitor to the Fuso line of trucks. Nissan Diesel America, along with Ford and Navistar International's joint venture LCF, were also competitors in the U.S.

Secondarily, MFTA competed with makers of conventional medium-duty trucks. Those were: Freightliner Medium Duty, International Medium Duty, Kenworth Medium Duty, and Peterbilt Medium Duty. As of 2019, Kenworth marketed two medium-duty cab over truck models in the U.S., the Kenworth K270 (Class 6) and K370 (Class 7). Peterbilt sold a medium-duty cabover truck model in the U.S. also, the Peterbilt 220.
