= Isuzu Motors Saudi Arabia =

- Company type: Subsidiary
- Industry: Manufacturing
- Founded: 2011; 15 years ago
- Headquarters: Dammam, Saudi Arabia
- Products: Commercial vehicles, trucks and bus chassis
- Owner: Isuzu Motors Limited (99%), Isuzu Motors Asia (1%)

Isuzu Motors Saudi Arabia Company Limited is a commercial vehicle manufacturer and dealer based in Dammam, Saudi Arabia. It is a joint venture between Isuzu (99%) and Isuzu Motors Asia (1%).

== History ==
The first concrete plans for this project can be traced back to 2007, but a corresponding declaration of intent and the establishment of the company were delayed until 2011 due to the Great Recession. At the end of 2012, the plant was opened in the presence of the Saudi Arabian Minister of Economics. It is the first complete production plant for Japanese trucks in the Gulf region.

The company has more than 100 employees. The theoretical capacity is 3000 units. Despite a planned capacity expansion to 25,000 copies at the time of opening, around 2000 and 1700 vehicles were produced in 2016 and 2017 respectively.

== Models ==
The F series is produced by Isuzu Motors Saudi Arabia.
