= Taiwan Isuzu Motors =

Taiwan Isuzu Motors Co
- Industry: Automotive
- Founded: 1995
- Defunct: 2011
- Headquarters: Taipei, Taiwan
- Key people: Yoshirou Shinbo (CEO)
- Products: Commercial vehicles
- Parent: Isuzu (69.5%), Prince Motor Company (20%), Itochu Shoji (10.5%)

Taiwan Isuzu Motors Co. (TIM; Chinese: 台灣五十鈴汽車工業股份有限公司) was founded in December 1995 as a commercial vehicle manufacturer with headquarters in Taipei, Taiwan. The company is both the assembler and distributor of Isuzu vehicles. The company is a joint venture between Isuzu owning 69.5%, and the Prince Motor Company with 20% and the Itochu Shoji with 10.5%. The Taiwanese branch required an investment in the amount of 309.4 million New Taiwan Dollar. Currently, the company employs about 50 workers. The plant management reports to the CEO Yoshirou Shinbo . Each year about 2,500 are trucks for distribution in the local market assembled.

The main task of this work is, however, in the area of logistics, on coordination to assemble vehicle parts. These are suspensions, shock absorbers, vehicle headlights, radio receivers and motors, which are produced by local manufacturers, and then here in the factory for delivery to other works on the so-called semi-knocked-down kits are packaged parts.

In 2012, Taipei Triangle Motors, a Taiwan subsidiary of Dah Chong Hong in Hong Kong, was appointed as importer and distributor of Isuzu in Taiwan.

== Current models ==
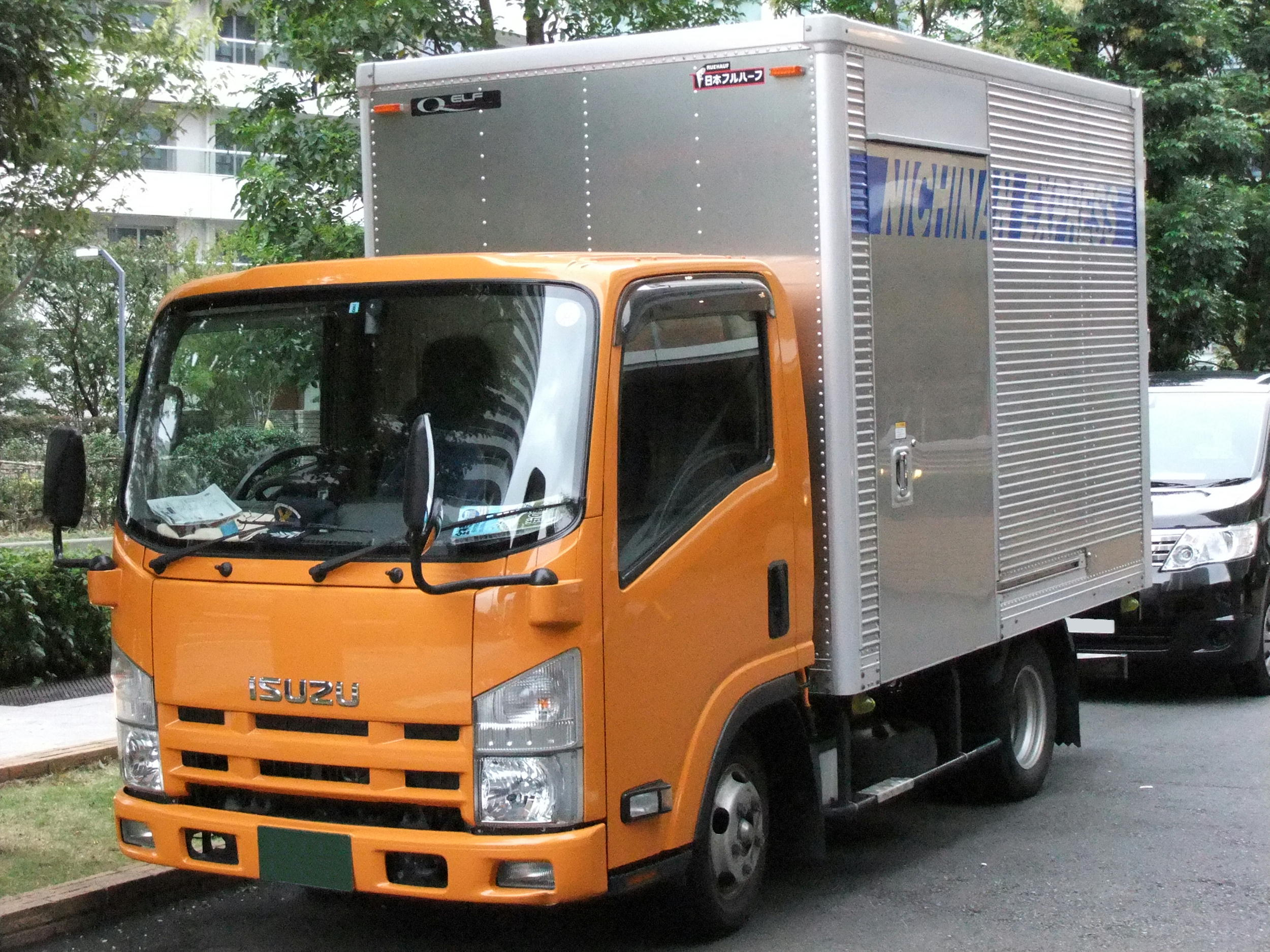
Isuzu Elf
2006-present

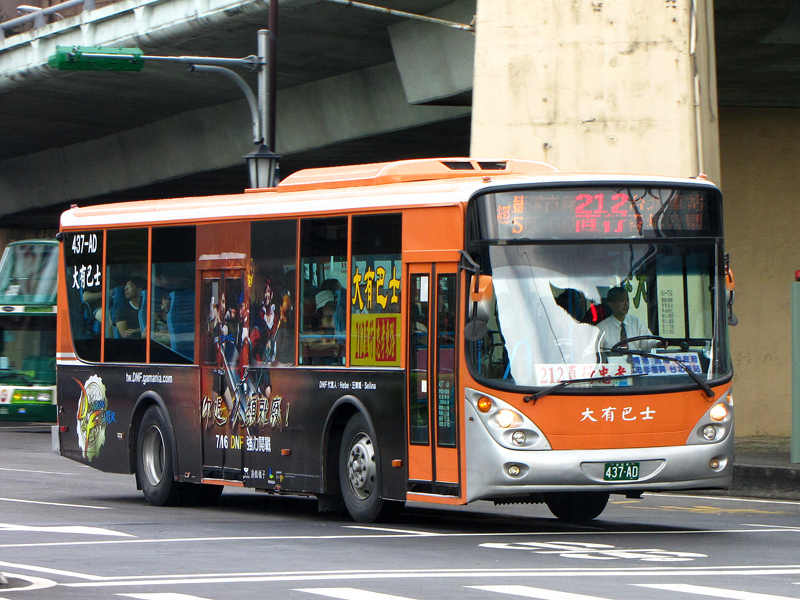
Isuzu LT134PPK
2007-present

== Former models ==
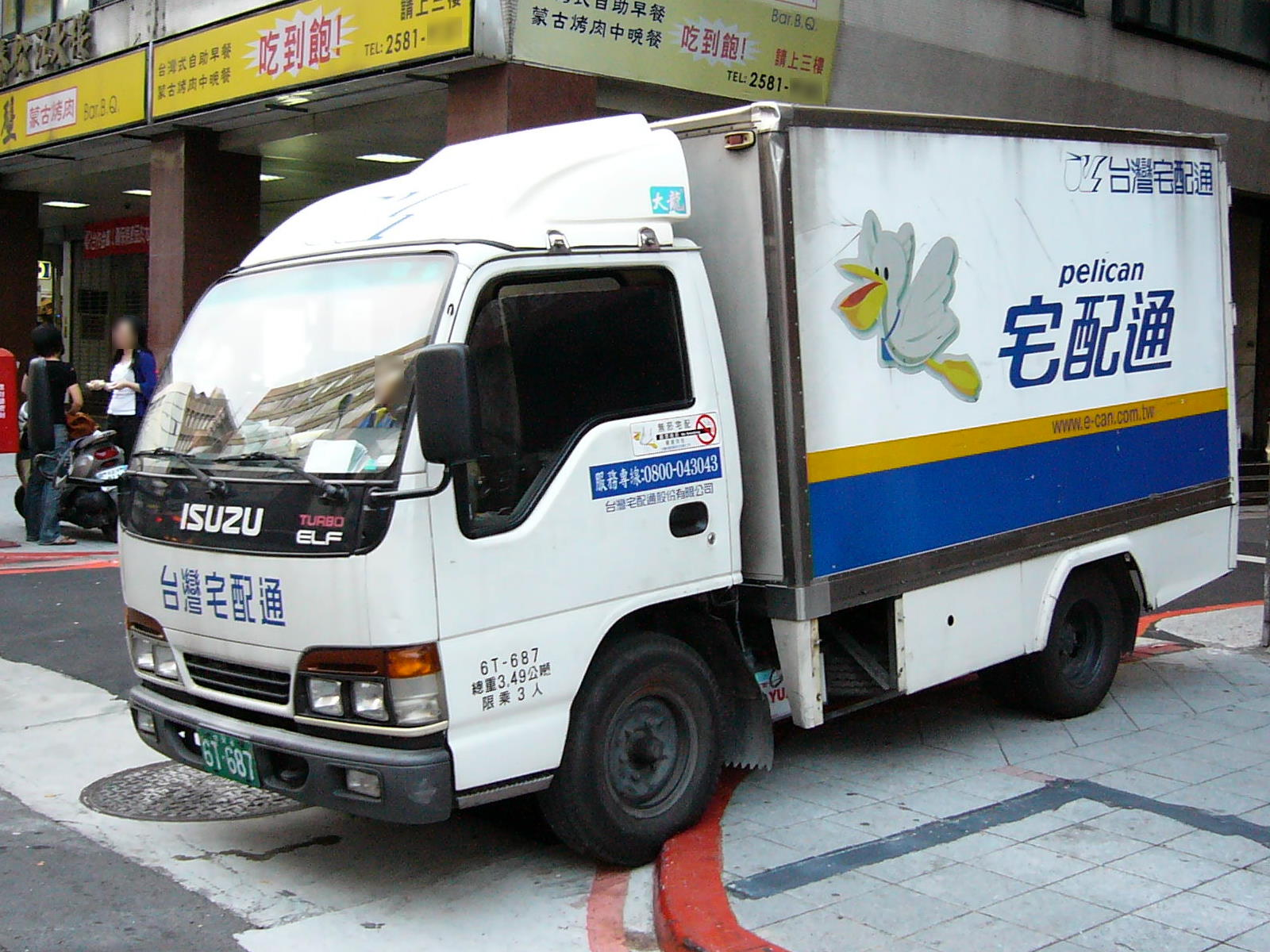
Isuzu Elf
1996 - 1999

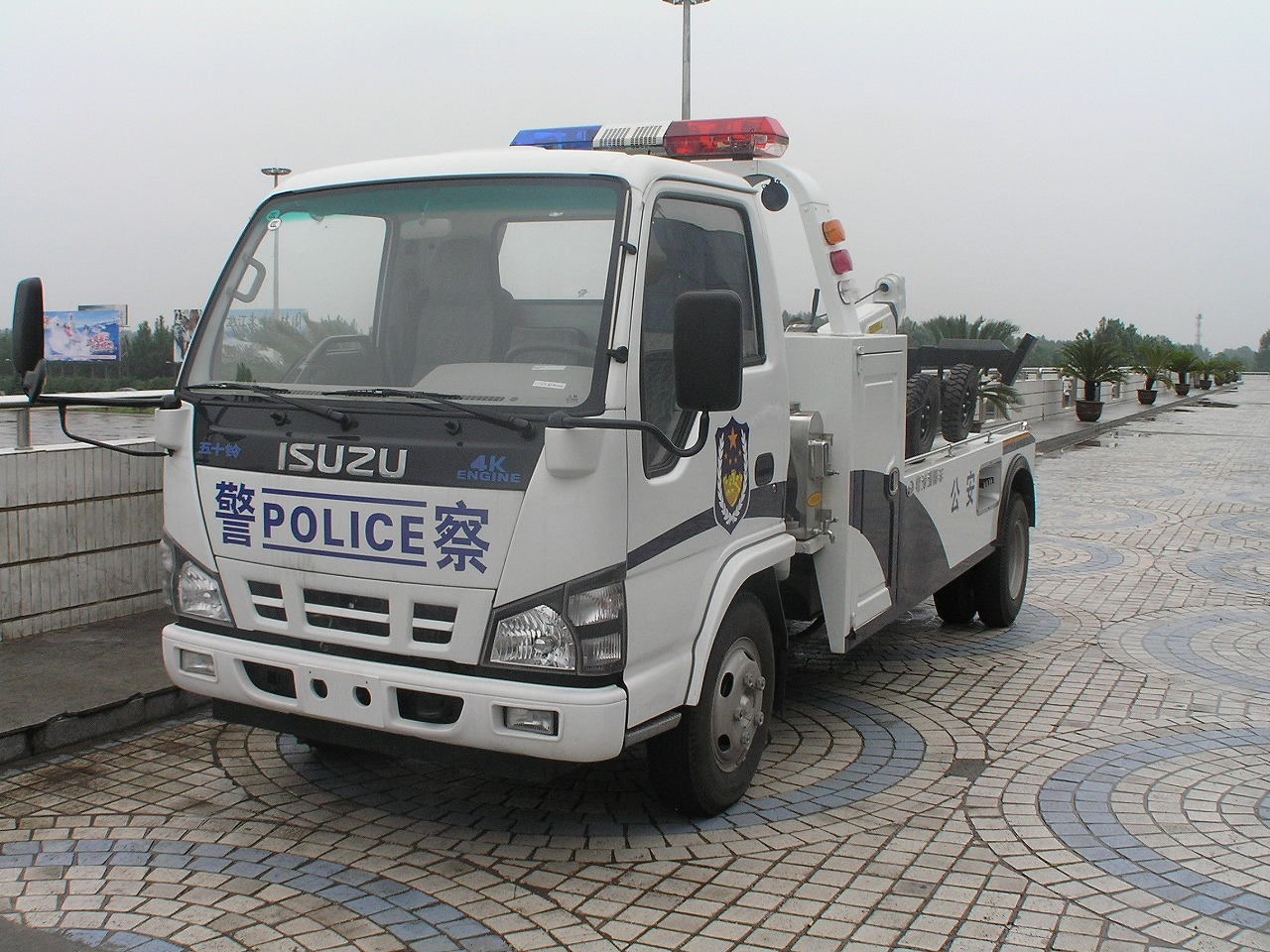
Isuzu Elf
1999 - 2006

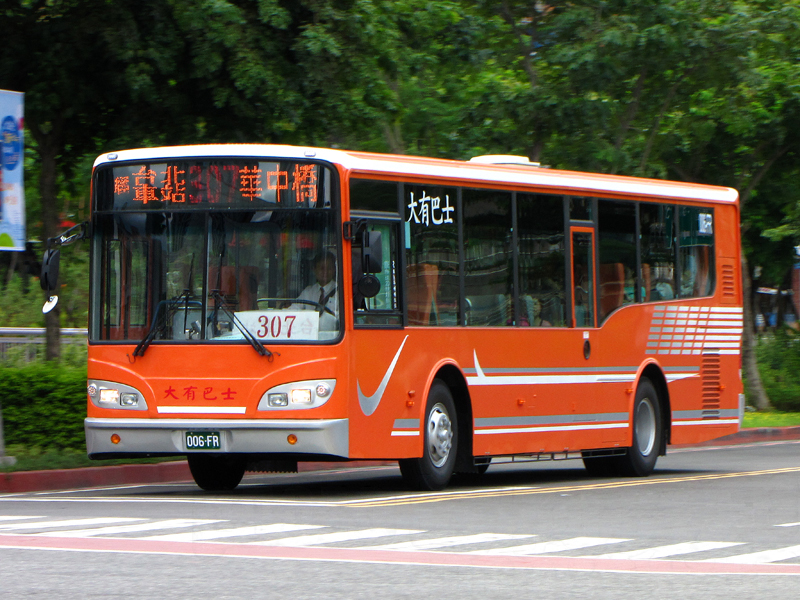
Isuzu LT134PMK
1999 - 2007
