= Isuzu Motors de México =

Mexican commercial vehicle manufacturer

- Company type: Subsidiary
- Industry: Manufacturing
- Founded: 29 April 2005; 21 years ago
- Headquarters: Mexico City, Mexico
- Products: Commercial vehicles, trucks and bus chassis
- Owner: Isuzu Motors Limited

Isuzu Motors de México, S. de R.L is a commercial vehicle manufacturer and dealer based in Mexico City, Mexico. It is the Mexican subsidiary of Isuzu and was established in 2005 and is currently managed by Hirokazu Maruyama.

== History ==
On 29 April 2005, after the agreement signed between Mexico and Japan, Isuzu Motors de México was founded, presenting for the first time at the ANTP forum. One of the first steps of this company was the ALDEN dealerships in Mexico City, Galería in Monterrey and Plasencia in Guadalajara. Two years later, in 2007, the Elf 300 was launched and in 2009 it began operations in the Mexico plant. Other launches that were carried out were the ELF600-BUS in 2010 and the Forward 1100, which sold a total of 20 thousand units by 2012.

== Models ==
- ELF Light Duty Trucks
- FORWARD Medium Duty Trucks
- SERIE BUS
- MOTORES INDUSTRIALES

In 2015, Isuzu Motors de México launched the flat ELF 100 class 2 truck, an urban light load with the capacity to support one ton of cargo, which according to Hiroshi Ikegawa, deputy director of sales, has a 4JH1-TCN diesel engine developed for Mexico with standard Euro IV emission.

Its most recent branch is located in Villahermosa, Tabasco, which was inaugurated on 20 October 2016.
