= Isuzu Malaysia =

Isuzu logo

Isuzu Malaysia Sdn Bhd (IMSB) was established on 6 September 2004 as a commercial vehicle manufacturer. The company headquarters located in Petaling Jaya, Malaysia. The plant development is a joint venture between DRB-HICOM, Isuzu Operations (Thailand) Co. Ltd. and Isuzu Motors Asia Ltd. The management of the plant of about 700 workers is under the authority of the CEO Kenji Matsuoka. Isuzu Malaysia produces the Isuzu N-Series and the popular Isuzu D-Max. Over 5,000 vehicles are produced here annually.

== Current models ==
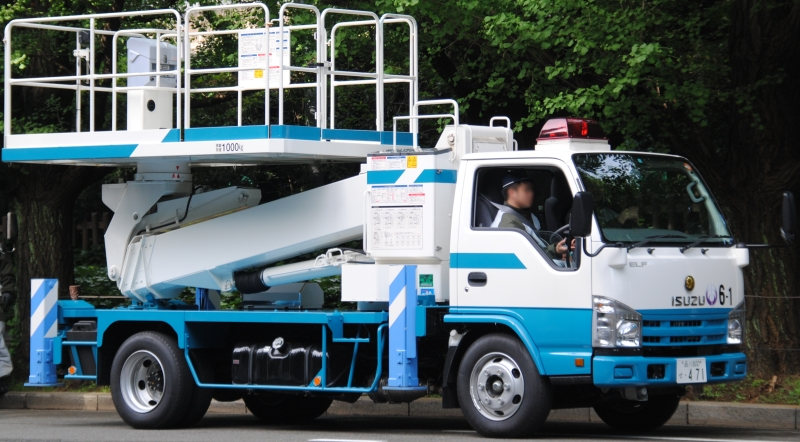
Isuzu N-series
2004-present

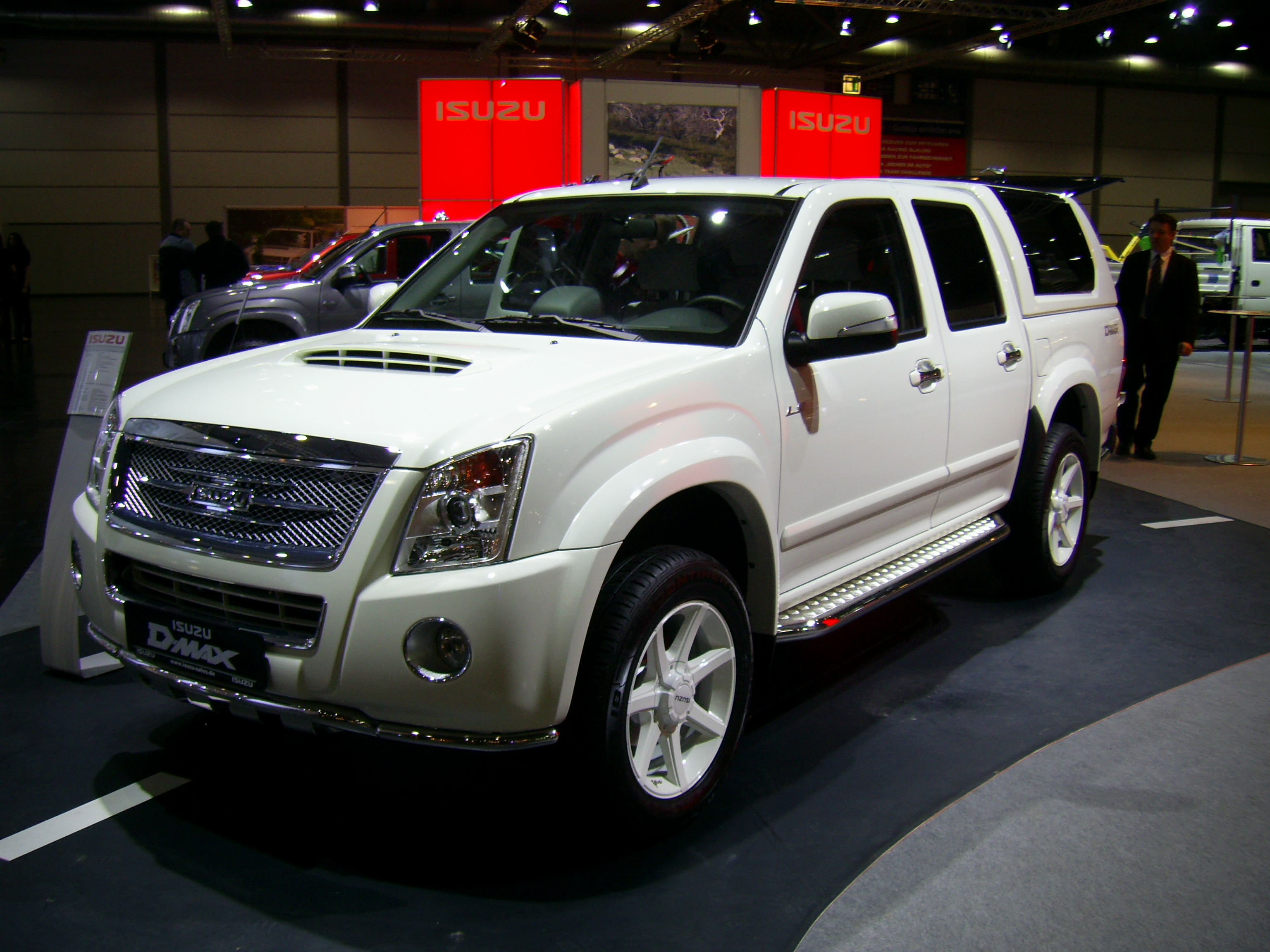
Isuzu D-Max
2009-present

== Former model ==
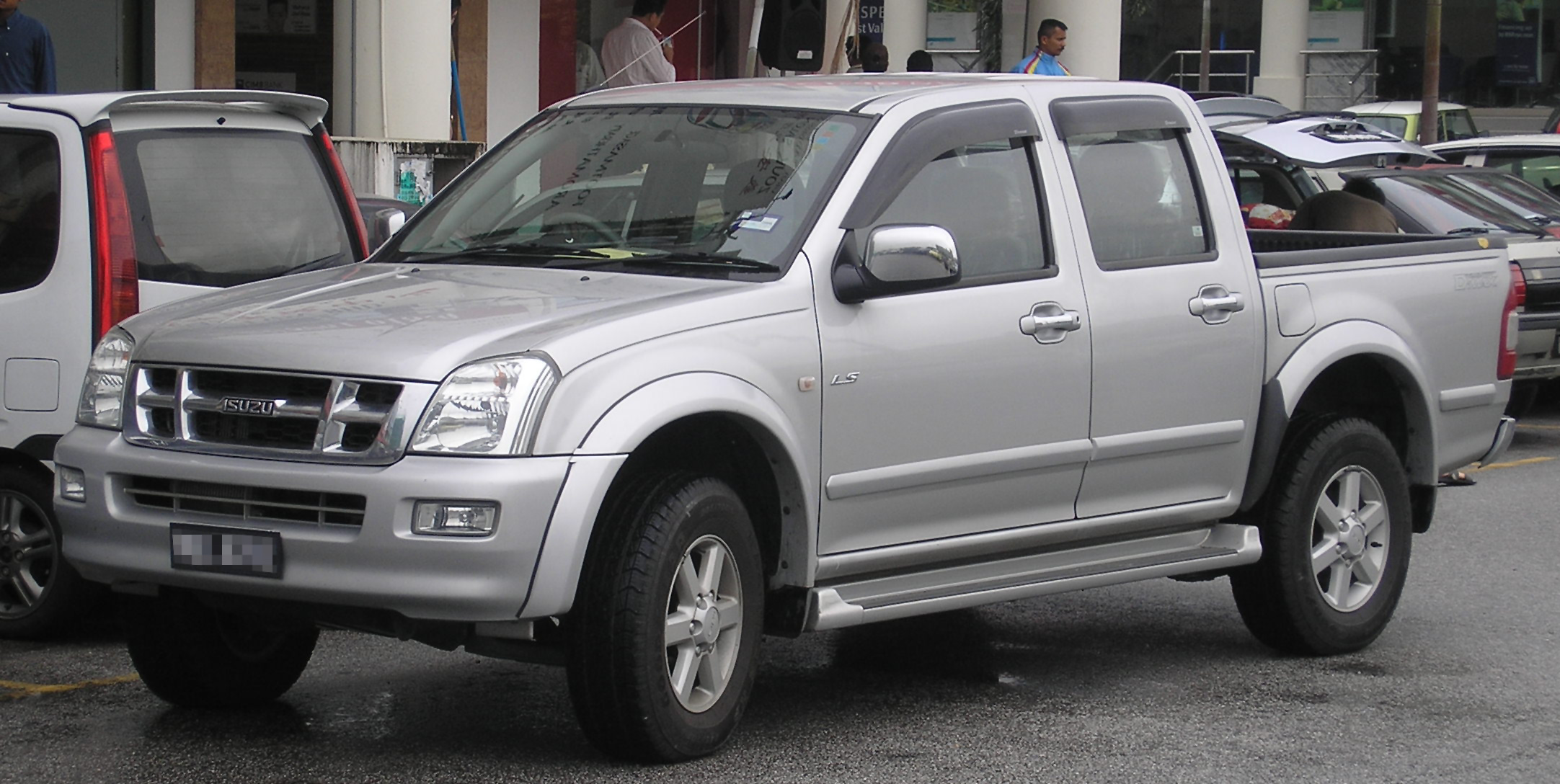
Isuzu D-Max
2004 - 2009
