= Sollers-Isuzu =

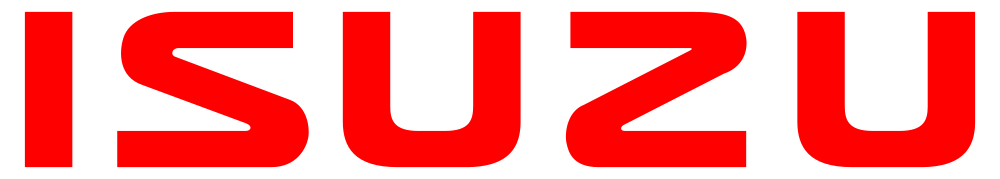
- Industry: Automotive
- Founded: 2006; 20 years ago
- Defunct: 2023
- Headquarters: Ulyanovsk, Russia
- Owners: Sollers JSC, Isuzu

JSC "ISUZU RUS" (АО ИСУЗУ РУС) is a commercial vehicle manufacturer with headquarters in Ulyanovsk, Russia. The company was founded in 2006 as a joint venture between OAO Sollers, which contributed with a share of 66%, Isuzu, which participated with a share of 29%, and the Imperial Sojitz, which, had a share of 5%. Until the General Assembly of Shareholders on 11 January 2010, the company was named ZAO Severstal-Isuzu (ЗАО Северстальавто-Исузу). The company was established with an investment of 350 million rubles. The management reports to the Chief Executive Officer Franz Gerhard Hilgert.

From 2002, Sollers built Isuzu AUV as a Russian version of the Isuzu Panther. The model, however, had only limited success and could not argue with sales of just 780 units per year. Due to the low price, most of the units were produced at Sollers are exported to the Philippines. In the spring of 2009, the production of the AUV was then stopped completely. As a replacement a few months later were the Isuzu C-Series, the Isuzu D-series, and the Isuzu N-Series introduced. With the new model, the production program of the Japanese brand in Russia has increased to 25,000 units a year. Announcements of the work according to, production is to be doubled for a plant expansion in the coming years even.

In December 2015 Sollers Company sold its shares to the joint venture partners – Isuzu Motors Ltd. (74% in total) and Sojitz Corporation (26%). So now the company is fully Japanese.

Isuzu trucks are well known around the world due to successful marketing policy and competent management. Their stated advantages include durability, reliability and endurance, combined with accessibility and ease of use. This makes the ISUZU vehicles popular in all regions of Russia.

== Current models ==
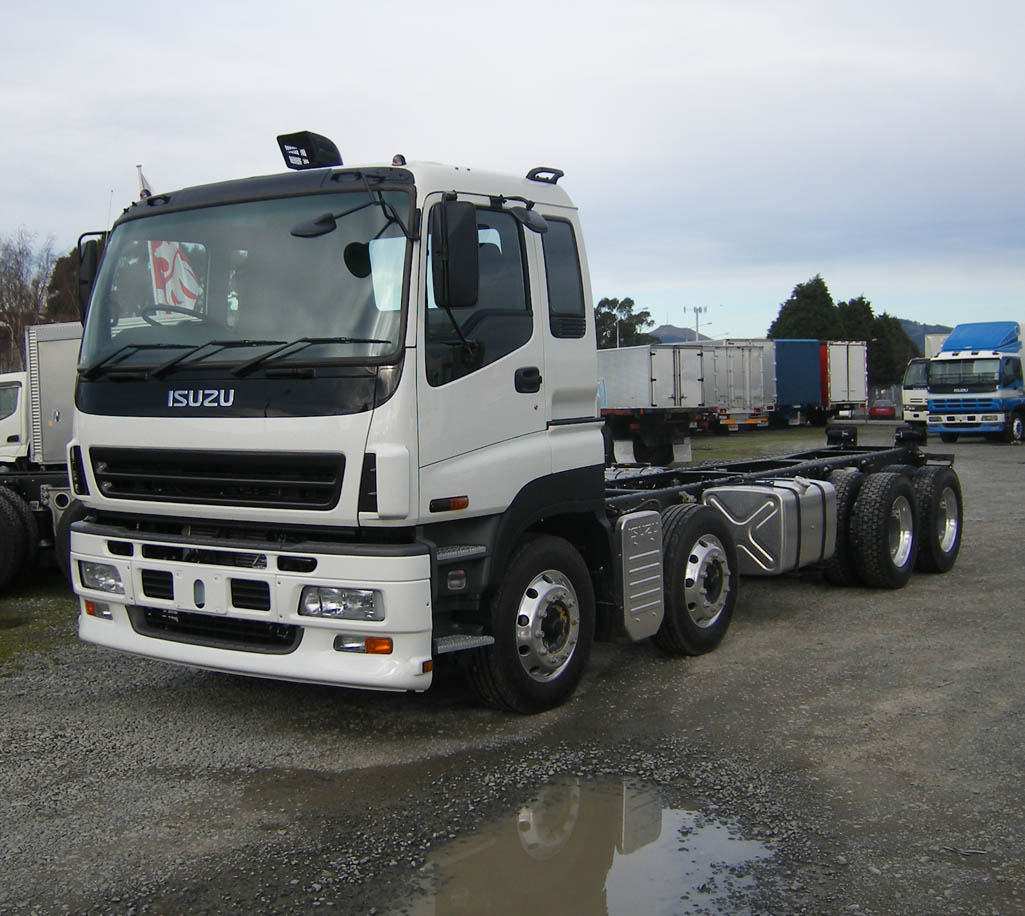
Isuzu C-Serie
Исузу C-серия
2009–2023

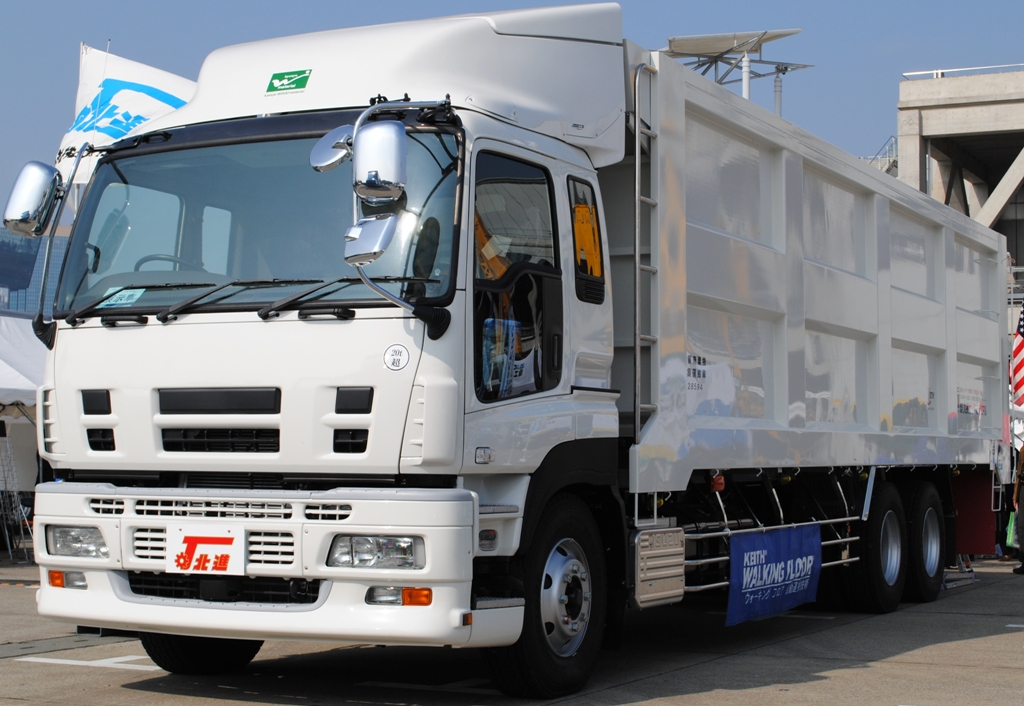
Isuzu E-Serie
Исузу E-серия
2009–2023

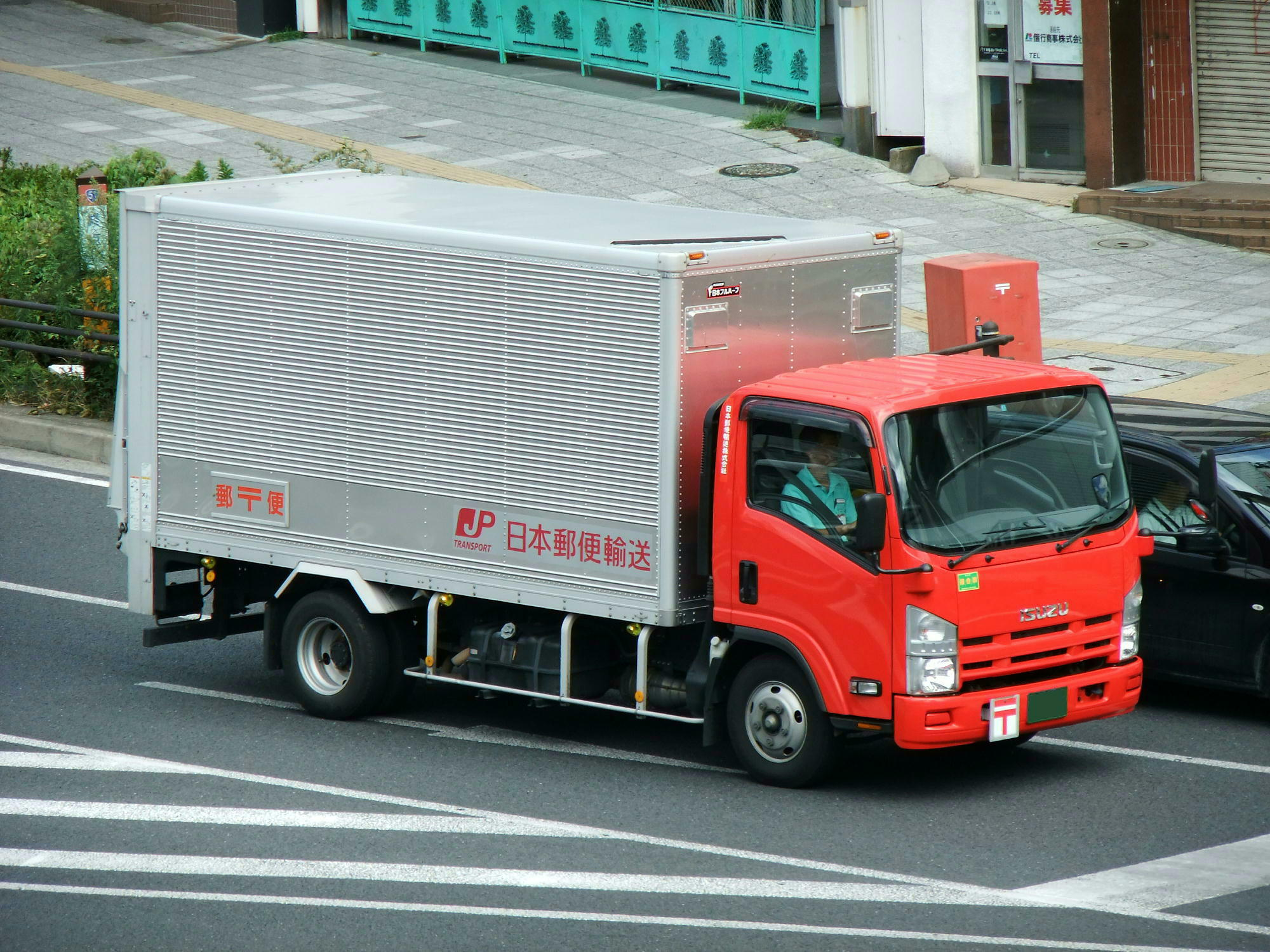
Isuzu N-Serie
Исузу N-серия
2009–2023

== Former models ==
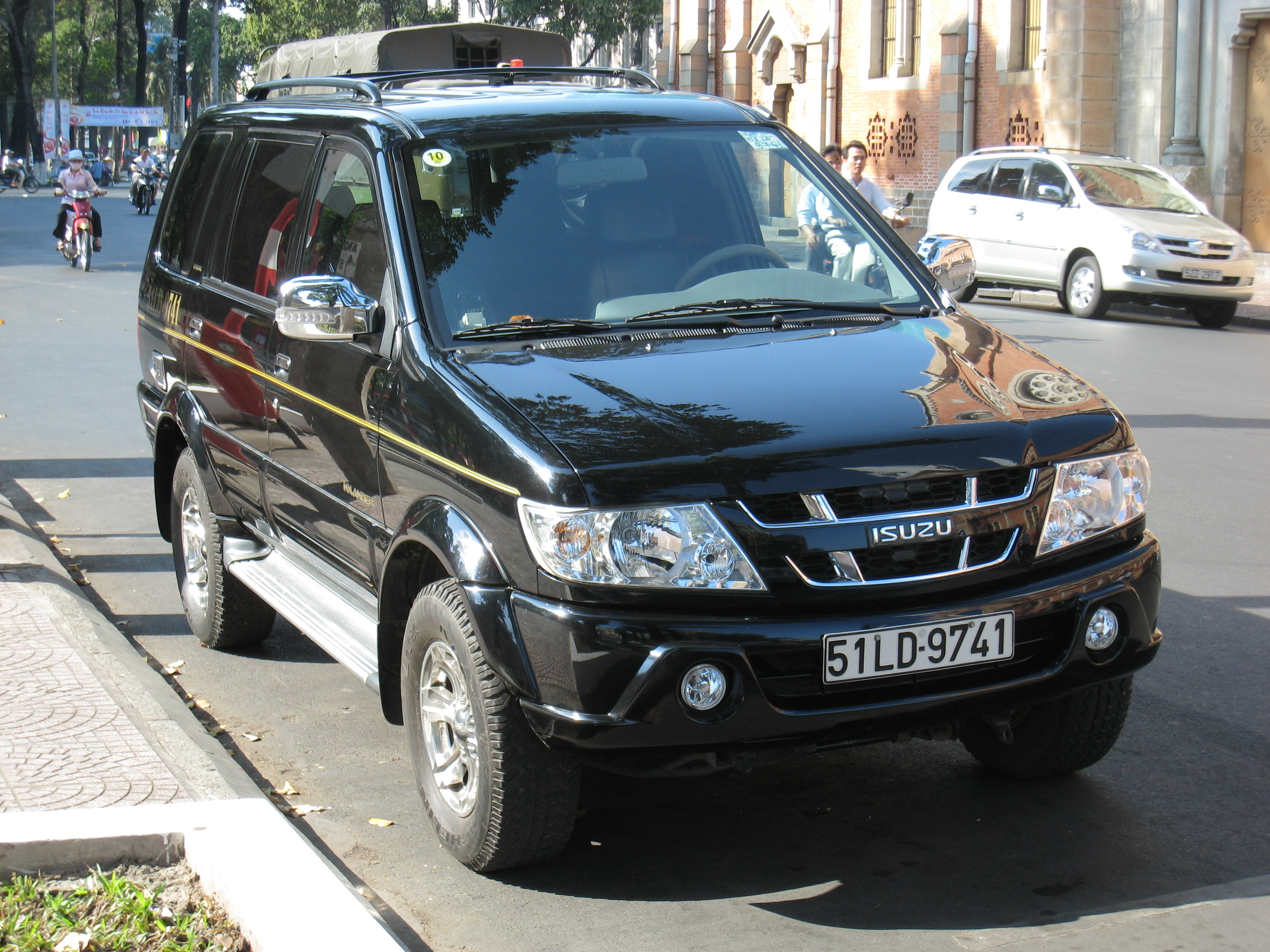
Isuzu AUV
Исузу AUV
2002 - 2009
