= Isuzu Unicab =

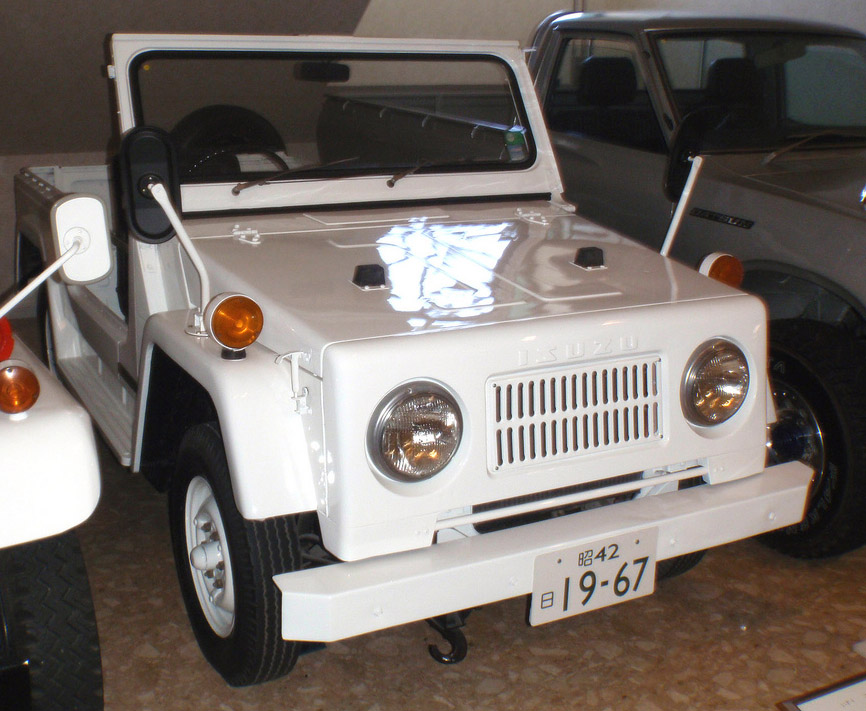

Overview
- Manufacturer: Isuzu
- Production: 1967–1974

Body and chassis
- Class: Compact sport utility vehicle
- Body style: 2-door SUV
- Layout: Front engine, rear-wheel drive

The Isuzu Unicab is an SUV produced by the Japanese manufacturer Isuzu from 1967 to 1974.

== History ==
The model was first presented at the Tokyo Motor Show in 1966 and was offered on the domestic market from July 1967 at a price of ¥ 490,005. Initially, it was powered by a 1.3-liter gasoline engine, which was later enlarged to 1.5 liters. The Unicab was initially only available as a pickup with 4 seats. In 1970 the model was offered with 2 side benches on the loading area, which increased the capacity to 8 seats. Shortly after the start of sales, the model was also offered with a convertible top and could now be used as a convertible. The windshield could be folded down, but this was no longer allowed due to new safety standards from 1970 and was changed in production. The Unicab was intended more for younger buyers as a recreational vehicle and for the city and therefore had no all-wheel drive. However, the concept for the Japanese domestic market was too early to attract buyers' sympathy. Accordingly, sales were low and production stopped in 1974.

The car was not in demand by the army either, although in 1972, the Indonesian National Armed Forces purchased several hundred units for the Navy and Coast Guard.
