= Isuzu Commercial Truck of America =

Division of Isuzu

Isuzu Commercial Truck of America, Inc.
- Corporate Logo

- Dealership Logo
- Headquarters: Anaheim, California, USA
- Number of locations: 293 dealerships in USA, 22 in Canada
- Area served: North America (United States & Canada)
- Key people: Hisao Sasaki (President & CEO); Shaun Skinner (Executive Vice President & General Manager)
- Products: Commercial Vehicles (Class 3-5)
- Brands: Isuzu Gold Star Certified Pre-Owned, Vehicle Health Reports, Isuzu Priority Service Maintenance Program
- Number of employees: 150
- Parent: Isuzu
- Subsidiaries: Isuzu Commercial Truck of Canada, Inc.
- Website: isuzucv.com

Isuzu Commercial Truck of America, Inc. (ICTA) is the North American subsidiary of Isuzu. It is headquartered in Anaheim, California. Isuzu commercial trucks have been the #1 selling low cab forward trucks in America every year since 1986.

== History ==
=== 1984–1990 ===
ICTA was established on March 21, 1984. The first KS22 truck arrived at the Port of Jacksonville, Florida on November 10, 1984.In 1985 ICTA imported 1,300 more KS22 trucks.

According to R.L. Polk & Company registration data, Isuzu became the best-selling low cab forward in the United States in 1986. R.L. Polk & Company statistics reported Isuzu-built trucks then dominated 30% of the U.S market in 1989.

=== 1991–2000 ===
On February 9, 1991, the first American-built gas engine NPR was built in Janesville, Wisconsin.

=== 2001–2010 ===
In April 2005, the 50,000th gas truck was built in Janesville. On April 17, 2007, Isuzu Commercial Truck of Canada, Inc. (ICTC) was incorporated.

=== 2011–present ===
In 2011, Charlotte, Michigan began producing gas trucks.

In 2012, the Isuzu Reach was named Medium-Duty Truck of the Year, and in 2013, the Isuzu N-Series was named Medium-Duty Truck of the Year

In 2014, Isuzu Commercial Truck of America, Inc. restored the very first KS22 truck sold for the 30th anniversary.
