= Isuzu =

Japanese multinational automobile manufacturer

Isuzu Motors Limited

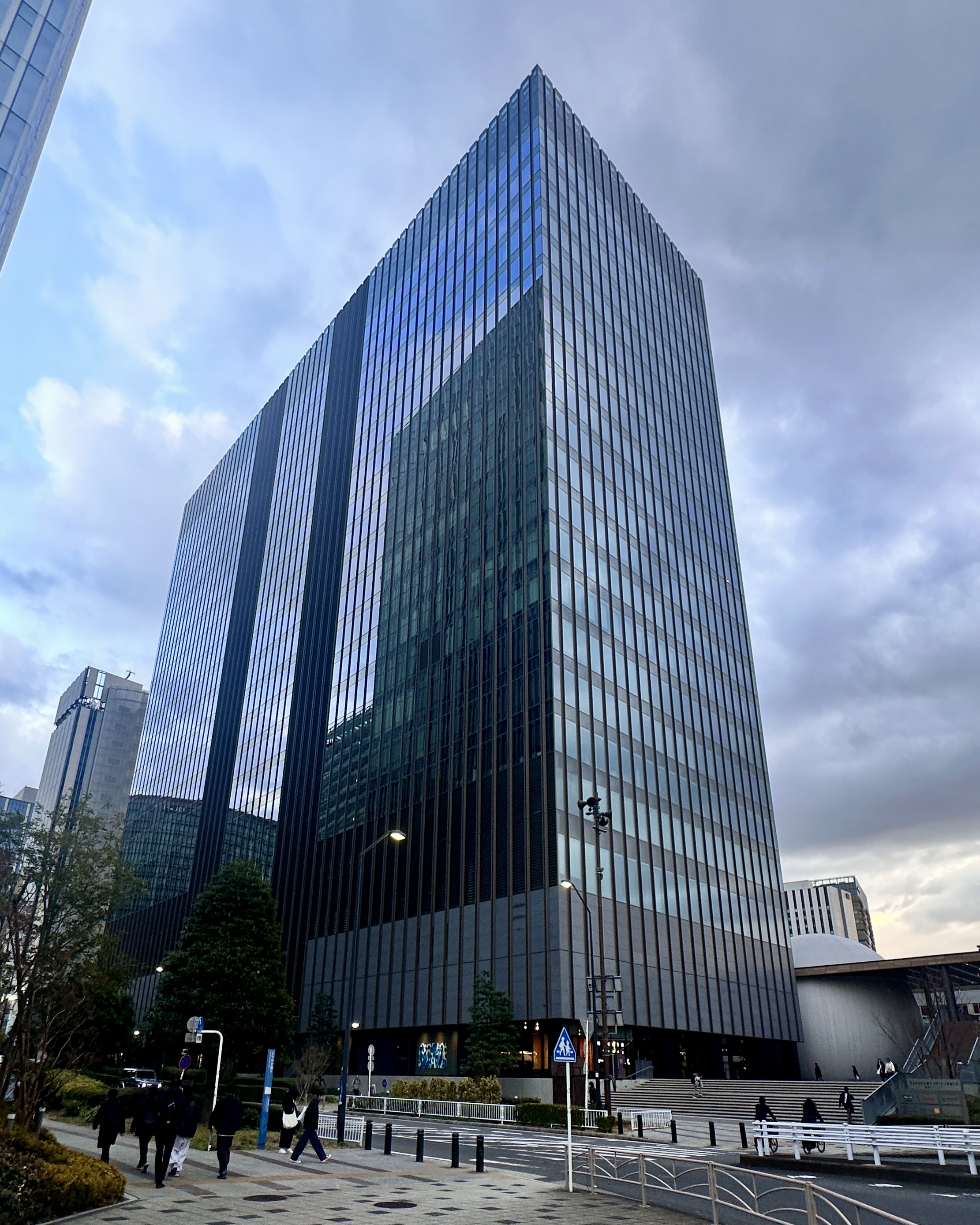
- Headquarters at Yokohama Gate Tower in Yokohama, Kanagawa Prefecture
- Native name: いすゞ自動車株式会社
- Romanized name: Isuzu Jidōsha Kabushiki-gaisha
- Type: Public
- Traded as: TYO: 7202; TOPIX Large 70 Component
- Industry: Manufacturing
- Founded: 30 March 1934; 92 years ago (as Isuzu)
- Headquarters: Yokohama Gate Tower, Nishi-ku, Yokohama, Kanagawa Prefecture, Japan
- Area served: Worldwide
- Key people: Masanori Katayama (Chairman); Shinsuke Minami (Vice Chairman & Director); Naohiro Yamaguchi (President, CEO & Representative Director); Takahiro Uematsu (Chief Design Officer)
- Products: Commercial vehicles; Diesel engines; Diesel generators; Passenger cars (until 2002)
- Revenue: ▲¥3,195.53 billion (FY2023)
- Operating income: ▲¥253.54 billion (FY2023)
- Net income: ▲¥151.74 billion (FY2023)
- Total assets: ▲¥3,046,777 million (FY2023)
- Total equity: ▲¥1,510,232 million (FY2023)
- Number of employees: 8,056 (44,495 consolidated)
- Subsidiaries: List: Anadolu Isuzu; Sollers-Isuzu; IAMI; Isuzu Commercial Truck of America; Isuzu HICOM Malaysia; Isuzu Malaysia; Isuzu Philippines; Isuzu Truck (UK); Isuzu South Africa; Taiwan Isuzu Motors; Isuzu Vietnam; Isuzu Motors India; UD Trucks; Industries Mécaniques Maghrébines; J-Bus (50%)
- Website: www.isuzu.co.jp/world/

Isuzu Motors Ltd. (Japanese: いすゞ自動車株式会社, Hepburn: Isuzu Jidōsha Kabushiki-Kaisha; Japanese pronunciation: [isɨᵝzɨᵝ], /iˈsuzu, aɪ-/) commonly known as Isuzu, is a Japanese multinational automobile manufacturer of commercial vehicles and diesel engines headquartered in Yokohama, Kanagawa Prefecture. Its principal activity is the production, marketing and sale of Isuzu commercial vehicles and diesel engines.

The company also has a number of subsidiaries and joint ventures, including UD Trucks, Anadolu Isuzu (a Turkish joint venture with Anadolu Group), Sollers-Isuzu (a Russian joint venture with Sollers JSC - Production stopped in March 2022, Isuzu stake transferred to Sollers in July 2023), Jiangxi Isuzu Motors (a Chinese joint venture with Jiangling Motors Company Group), Isuzu Astra Motor Indonesia, Isuzu Malaysia (Isuzu HICOM), Industries Mécaniques Maghrébines, Isuzu Truck (UK), Isuzu South Africa, Isuzu Philippines, Taiwan Isuzu Motors, Isuzu Vietnam, Isuzu Motors India and BYD Isuzu.

Isuzu has assembly and manufacturing plants in Fujisawa, which have been there since the company was founded under earlier names, as well as in the Tochigi and Hokkaido prefectures. Isuzu-branded vehicles are sold in most commercial markets worldwide. Isuzu's primary market focus is on commercial diesel-powered truck, buses and construction.

The company is named after the Isuzu River, the kanji of Isuzu (五十鈴), meaning "fifty bells".

== History ==
Isuzu Motors' history began in 1916, when Tokyo Ishikawajima Shipbuilding and Engineering Co., Ltd. planned a cooperation with the Tokyo Gas and Electric Industrial Company to build automobiles. The next step was taken in 1918, when a technical cooperation with Wolseley Motors Limited was initiated, yielding exclusive rights to the production and sales of Wolseley vehicles in East Asia from knock-down kits. In 1919 came the first ever Japan-produced passenger car, a Wolseley model, the Fifteen A9 15/40 НР at the Tokyo Ishikawajima Shipyard at the Fukagawa Factory. The Wolseley sourced CP truck followed two years later; 550 of these were built by 1927. In 1923 Japan was devastated by the Kanto earthquake which made the fledgling transportation infrastructure that was heavily reliant on government-owned railroads unusable due to the twisted tracks. Heavy construction vehicles were imported from the United States companies GMC and Ford to aid in recovery and reconstruction, and the company sought to contribute by producing locally built construction and heavy duty vehicles. In 1927 the company introduced its 2-ton load capacity "Sumida P-type truck" equipped with an A6 engine and a 1-ton vehicle "Sumida M-type No. 1 bus" equipped with an A4 engine. The name "sumida" was used from the Sumida River as the factory at Fukagawa was close by.

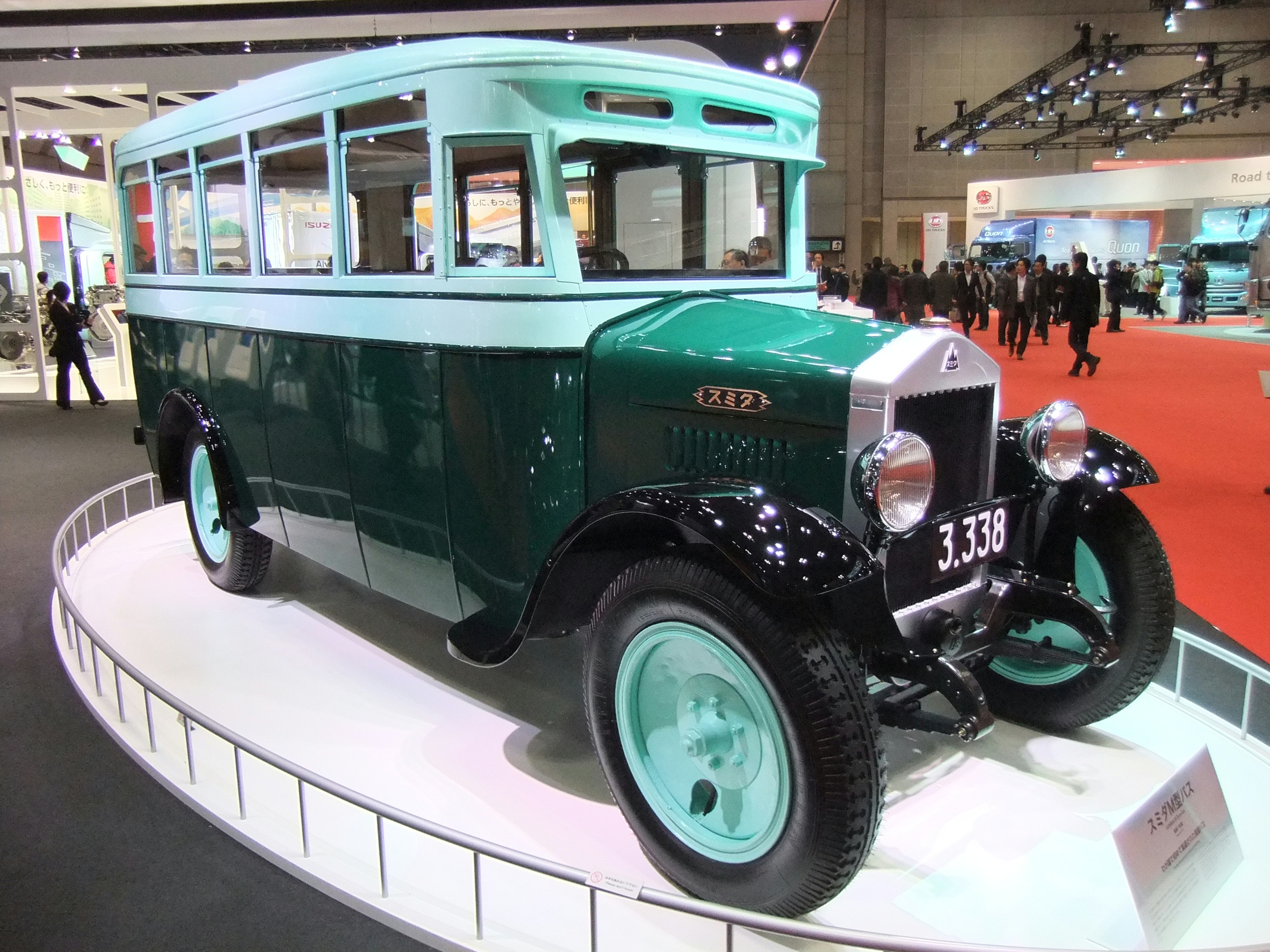
Isuzu Sumida bus 1927

In 1929 IHI Corporation, separated part of its manufacturing business and merged with DAT Automobile Manufacturing Inc. (a predecessor of Nissan) and changed its name to Jidosha Kogyo Co., Ltd. (Automobile Industries Co., Ltd.) The names used for the products of this company, marketed as "Sumida" and "Chiyoda", have special significance in Japan. Chiyoda is a district in Tokyo where the Imperial Palace is located, and Sumida refers to a river that flows through Tokyo approximately 3.59 km (2.23 mi) east of the Imperial Palace. In 1934 the Tsurumi Factory opened under company name Automobile Industry Co., Ltd. and in 1937 Automobile Industries was reorganized and formed into a new company, Tokyo Automobile Industries Co., Ltd. and was founded with a capital of ¥1,000,000. The company continued to manufacture heavy duty trucks and passenger buses, realizing the need to modernize the transportation infrastructure of Japan, and was one of the primary manufacturers for the Imperial Japanese Army along with Mitsubishi Heavy Industries, and had a corporate allegiance to the Yasuda Zaibatsu. One of the vehicles it produced for the war effort was the Sumida M.2593 armored personnel carrier. In 1942, Hino Heavy Industries was split off from Tokyo Automobile Industries, becoming a separate corporation. In 1949, the company was renamed Isuzu after the Isuzu River, following a meeting with the Japanese Government's Ministry of International Trade and Industry (MITI).

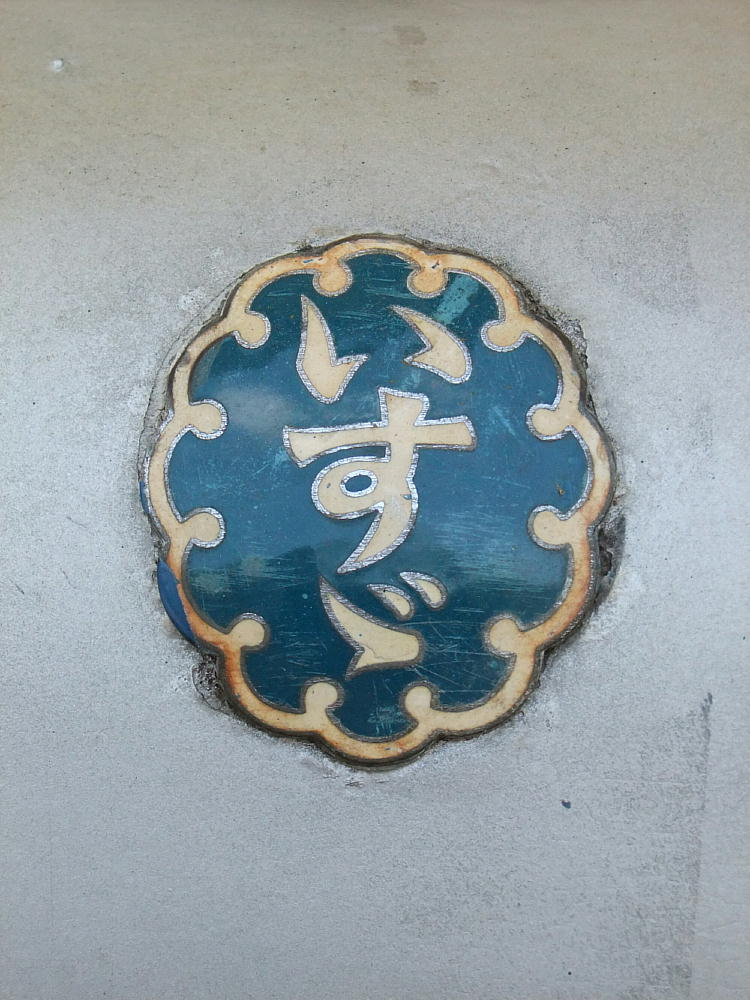
The first Isuzu corporate logo, 1949–1974

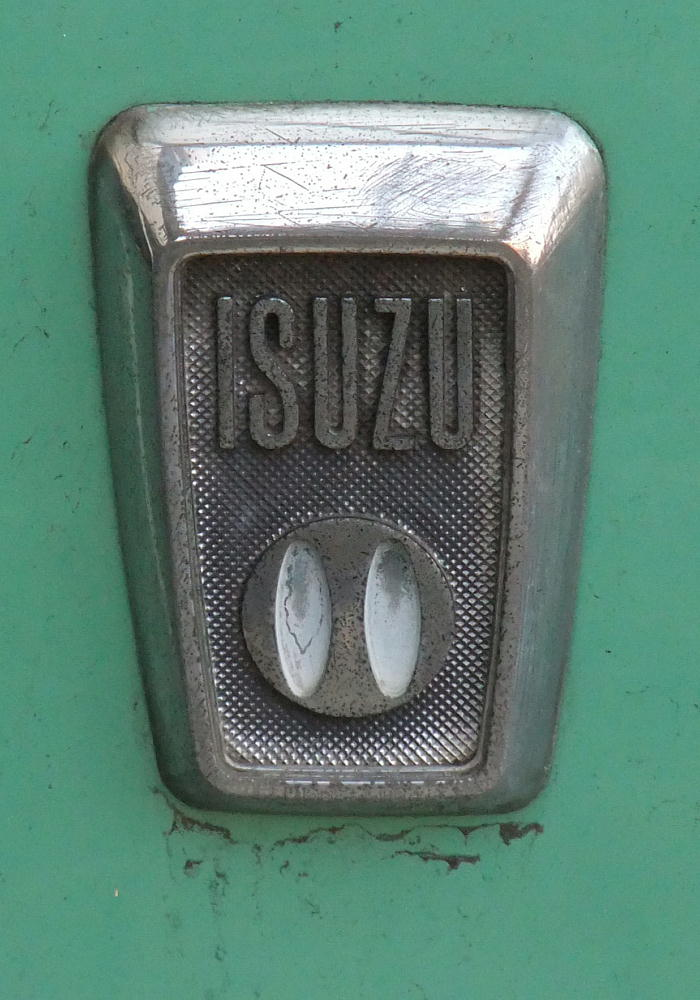
First Isuzu emblem, 1967–1974

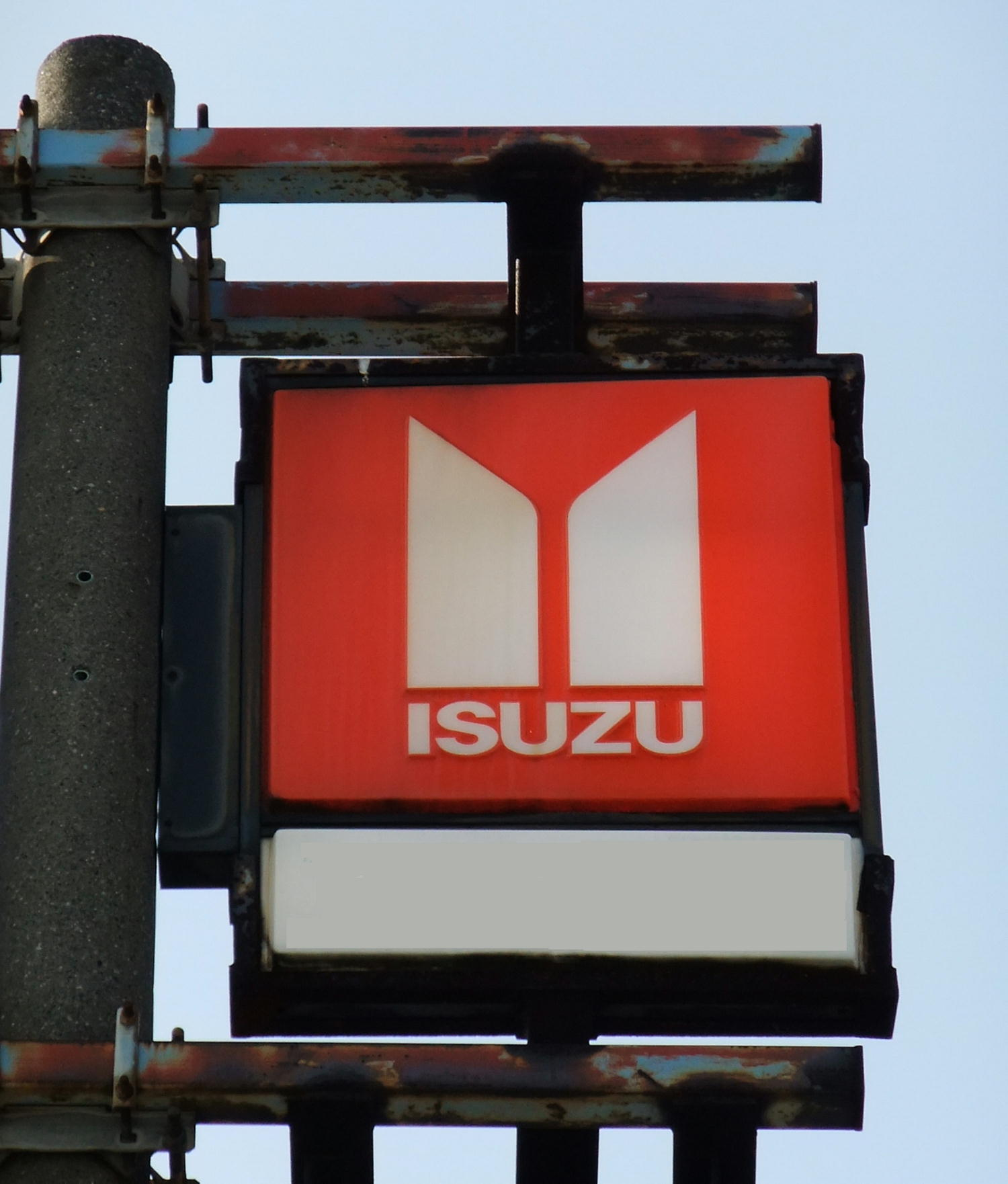
Second generation Isuzu emblem, 1974–1991

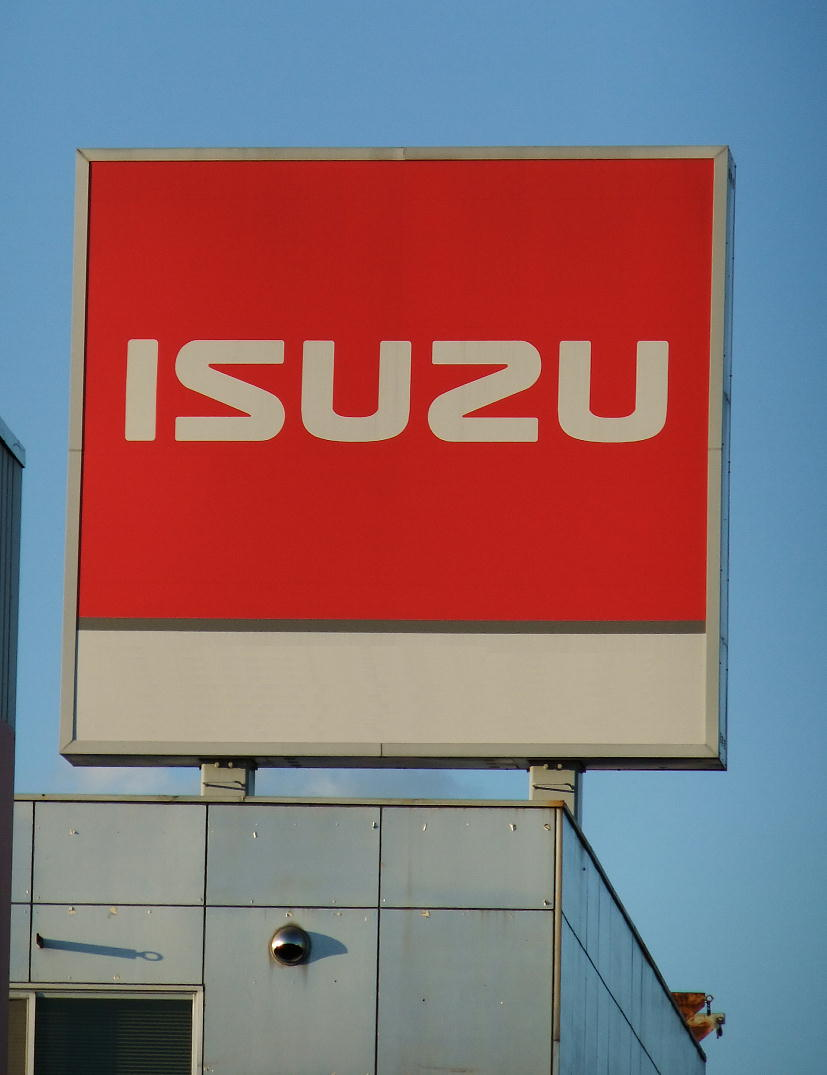
Current Isuzu emblem, 1991–present

=== Etymology ===
The word Isuzu translated into English means "fifty bells"—hence the focus on "bell" in both the later Bellel and the Bellett. The name was used from the Isuzu River that flows near to the Ise Grand Shrine, one of Japan's most sacred and revered shrines. The company's official Japanese name uses the archaic hiragana character ゞ, meaning that the "su" sound is repeated, but voiced.

=== Post-World War history ===
Truck and bus production of the TX40 and TU60 series and the Isuzu Sumida bus resumed in 1945, with the permission of the occupation authorities. and has remained the primary focus of manufacture for the company, along with diesel engine production. In 1958 a factory was built at Fujisawa, Kanagawa, and in 1959 the Isuzu Elf was introduced as a medium duty cab over commercial truck which is still in production, and was also shared with the Isuzu Journey bus. Isuzu continued to maintain its market presence by providing commercial vehicles by introducing the Isuzu TY in 1966. The company is one of the primary manufacturers of commercial duty trucks and buses for public transportation, to include the Isuzu Cubic, Isuzu Gala and the Isuzu Erga along with the Isuzu Giga.

=== Corporate partnerships ===
Beginning in 1953 the Hillman Minx passenger car is produced under license of Rootes Group giving the company a passenger car to compete with other Japanese manufacturers, realizing that their resources were limited and therefore sought out international partnerships. The Minx remained in production until 1962, after the 1961 introduction of Isuzu's first passenger car, the Bellel, and later the sports coupe Isuzu 117 Coupé. Being a small producer making cars which were somewhat too large and pricey for the Japanese market at the time, Isuzu spent some time looking for a commercial partner. Under pressure from MITI, who were attempting to limit the number of automobile manufacturers in Japan, a cooperation with Fuji Heavy Industries (Subaru) began in 1966. This joint sales-service collaboration was seen as the first step towards an eventual merger. The Subaru 1000 was even shown in Isuzu's 1967 annual vehicle brochure, as a suitable complement to the larger Isuzu lineup. This tie-up was over by 1968, when an agreement with Mitsubishi was formed. This ended even more quickly, by 1969, and the next year an equally short-lived collaboration was entered with Nissan. A few months later, in September 1971, what was to prove a more durable capital agreement was signed with General Motors. This would see GM own Isuzu for the next 35 years.

=== Linking with General Motors ===
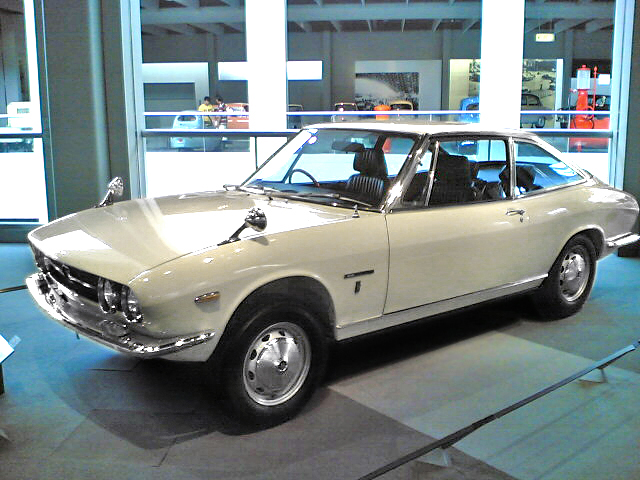
Isuzu 117 Coupe

While the company had a long relationship with GM going back to the 1920s, the first investment of GM taking a 34% stake in Isuzu was seen in 1972, when the Chevrolet LUV became the first Isuzu-built vehicle to be sold in the United States. To symbolize the new beginning, Isuzu also developed a new logo for 1974, with two vertical pillars as stylized representations of い ('i'), the first kana in いすゞ ('Isuzu'). In 1974 Isuzu introduced the Gemini, which was co-produced with General Motors as the T-body Chevrolet Chevette. A modified version was sold in the United States as Buick's Opel by Isuzu, and in Australia as the Holden Gemini. As a result of the collaboration, certain American GM products were sold to Japanese customers through Isuzu dealerships. Holden's Statesman was also briefly sold (246 examples) with Isuzu badging in Japan during the seventies. Isuzu exports also increased considerably as a result of being able to use GM networks, from 0.7% of production in 1973 to 35.2% by 1976; this while overall production increased more than fourfold in the same period. As a result of the GM joint venture, Isuzu engines were also used by existing GM divisions (some USA-market Chevrolet automobiles had Isuzu powertrains e.g. the Chevette and early S10/S15 trucks manufactured prior to 1985).

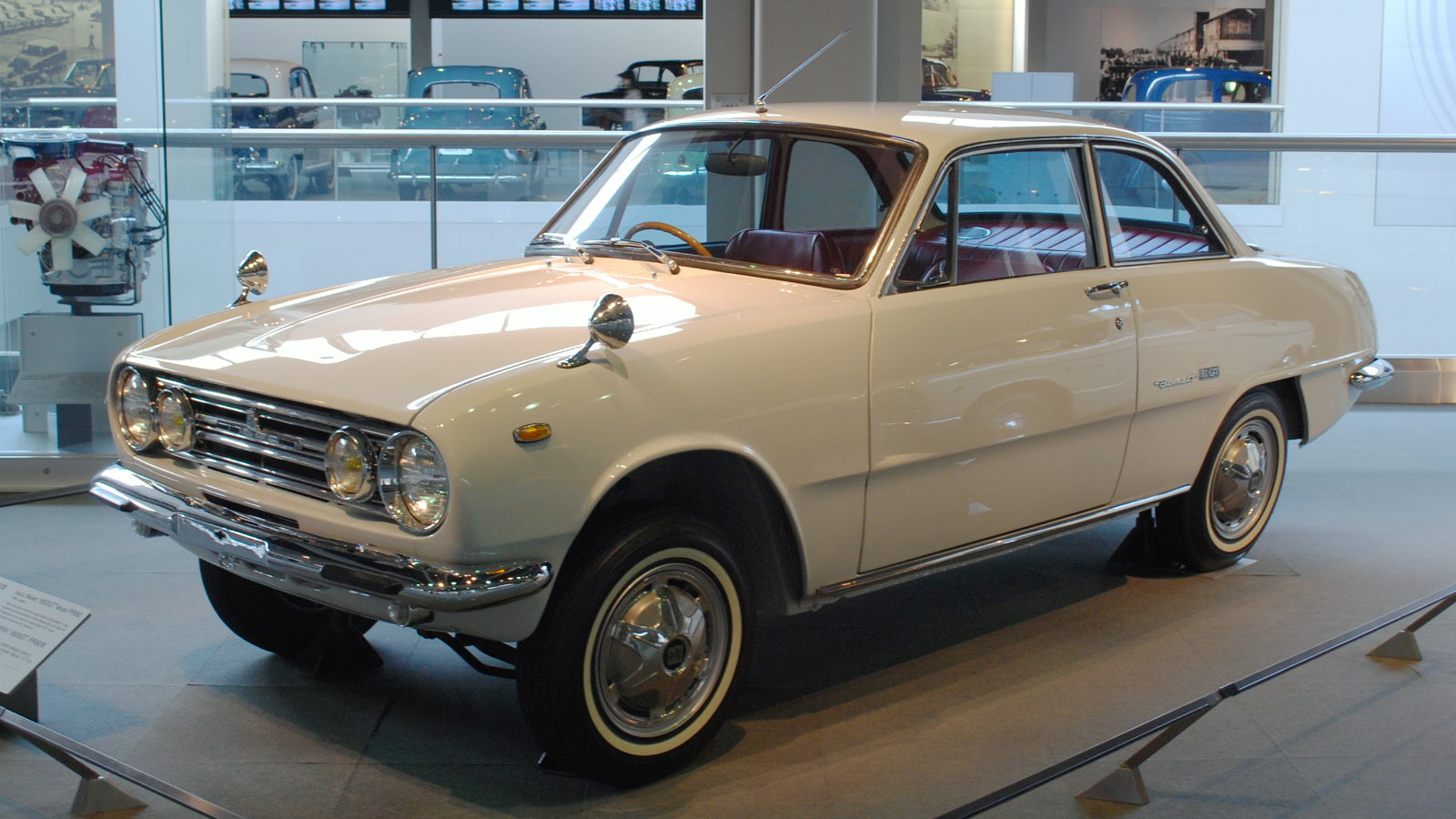
1966 Isuzu Bellett 1600 GT (PR90)

In 1981 Isuzu began selling consumer and commercial vehicles under their own brand in the United States. The Isuzu P'Up was the first model sold to consumers as an Isuzu, rather than as a Chevrolet or Buick, along with the Isuzu Piazza sports car. Isuzu's then president Toshio Okamoto then initiated a collaboration with small-car expert Suzuki to develop a global small car for GM, the S-car. A three-way agreement of co-ownership was signed in August 1981, with Isuzu and Suzuki exchanging shares and General Motors taking a 5% share of Suzuki. Following on from this, in 1985 Isuzu and GM established the IBC Vehicles venture in the United Kingdom, producing locally built versions of Isuzu and Suzuki light vans (the Isuzu Fargo and Suzuki Carry); to be sold in the European market under Vauxhall's Bedford brand. During this period Isuzu also developed a worldwide presence as an exporter of diesel engines, with their powerplants in use by Opel/Vauxhall, Land Rover, Hindustan, and many others. Two Isuzu model lines (Gemini, Impulse) were marketed as part of the Geo division (Spectrum, Storm) when it was initially launched as a Chevrolet subsidiary. In the domestic Japanese market, OEM deals with other manufacturers were entered to aid the poorly performing passenger car arm. It led to the badging of Suzukis, beginning in 1986, and Subaru small commercial vehicles as Isuzus (Geminett, Geminett II). This OEM tie-up occurred alongside the establishment of SIA (Subaru-Isuzu Automotive), an American joint venture with Fuji Heavy Industries (the parent company of Subaru). Shortly afterwards, the Lafayette, Indiana plant became operational.

=== Contraction begins ===
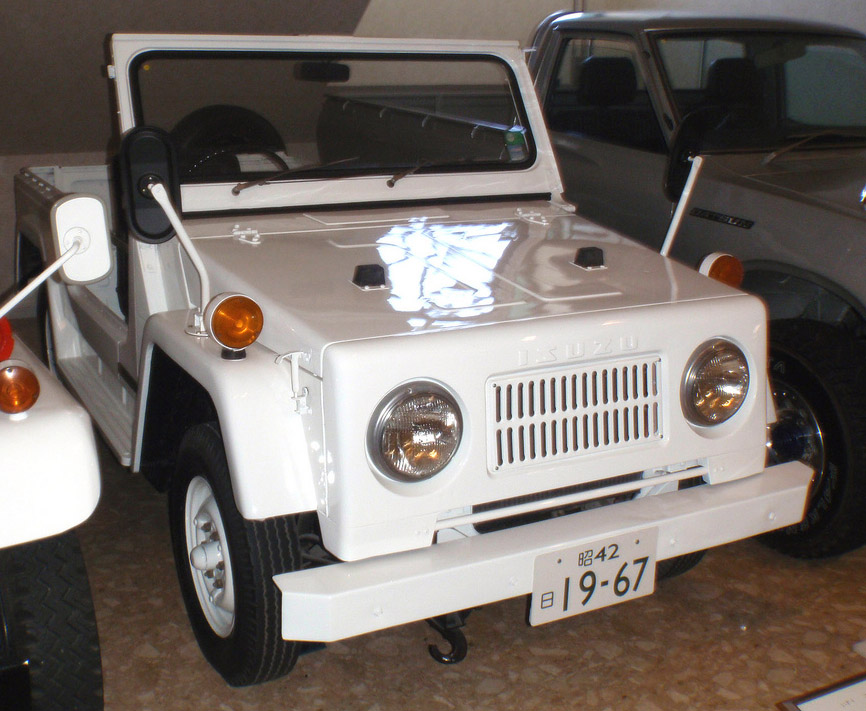
1967 Isuzu Unicab, a two-wheel-drive utility vehicle

Isuzu ended US sales of the Impulse (Geo Storm) in 1992, and the following year it stopped exporting the Stylus (the basis for the Geo Spectrum), the last Isuzu-built car sold in the US.

In 1993 Isuzu began a new vehicle exchange program with Honda, whereby Honda sold the Isuzu Rodeo and Isuzu Trooper as the Honda Passport and Acura SLX, respectively. In return Isuzu began selling the Honda Odyssey as the Isuzu Oasis. Thus, Honda's lineup gained two SUVs, and Isuzu's lineup gained a minivan. In the Japanese market, the Gemini (Stylus) was now a rebadged Honda Domani and the Aska (originally based on the GM J-car) was a Honda Accord, while Honda received the 2-door MU as the Jazz and the 4-door Trooper as the Horizon.

Isuzu's United States sales reached a peak in 1996 after the introduction of the Isuzu Hombre pickup, a badge-engineered GM truck (using the sheetmetal of the Brazil-market Chevrolet S10). Isuzu resurrected the Amigo in 1998, before changing the name of the 2-door convertible to Rodeo Sport in 2001 in an attempt to associate it with the better selling 4-door Rodeo. The new Axiom launched in 2001, with the fictional salesman Joe Isuzu from 1980s advertising campaigns brought back to promote it. Isuzu sales began to slide due to the aging of the Rodeo and Trooper, and poor management and a lack of assistance from GM. The Rodeo Sport was discontinued in 2003, while production of the Rodeo and Axiom ceased a year later. By this point sales in North America had slowed to just 27,188, with the discontinued Rodeo and Axiom making up 71% of that total.

In 1998 GM and Isuzu formed DMAX, a joint venture to produce diesel engines. GM raised its stake in Isuzu to 49% the following year, effectively gaining control of the company, and quickly followed this up by appointing an American GM executive to head Isuzu's North American Operations. This marked the first time a non-Japanese executive had held such a high position at Isuzu. In 2001 GM and Isuzu announced plans to share distribution networks and for Chevrolet to market an Isuzu product.

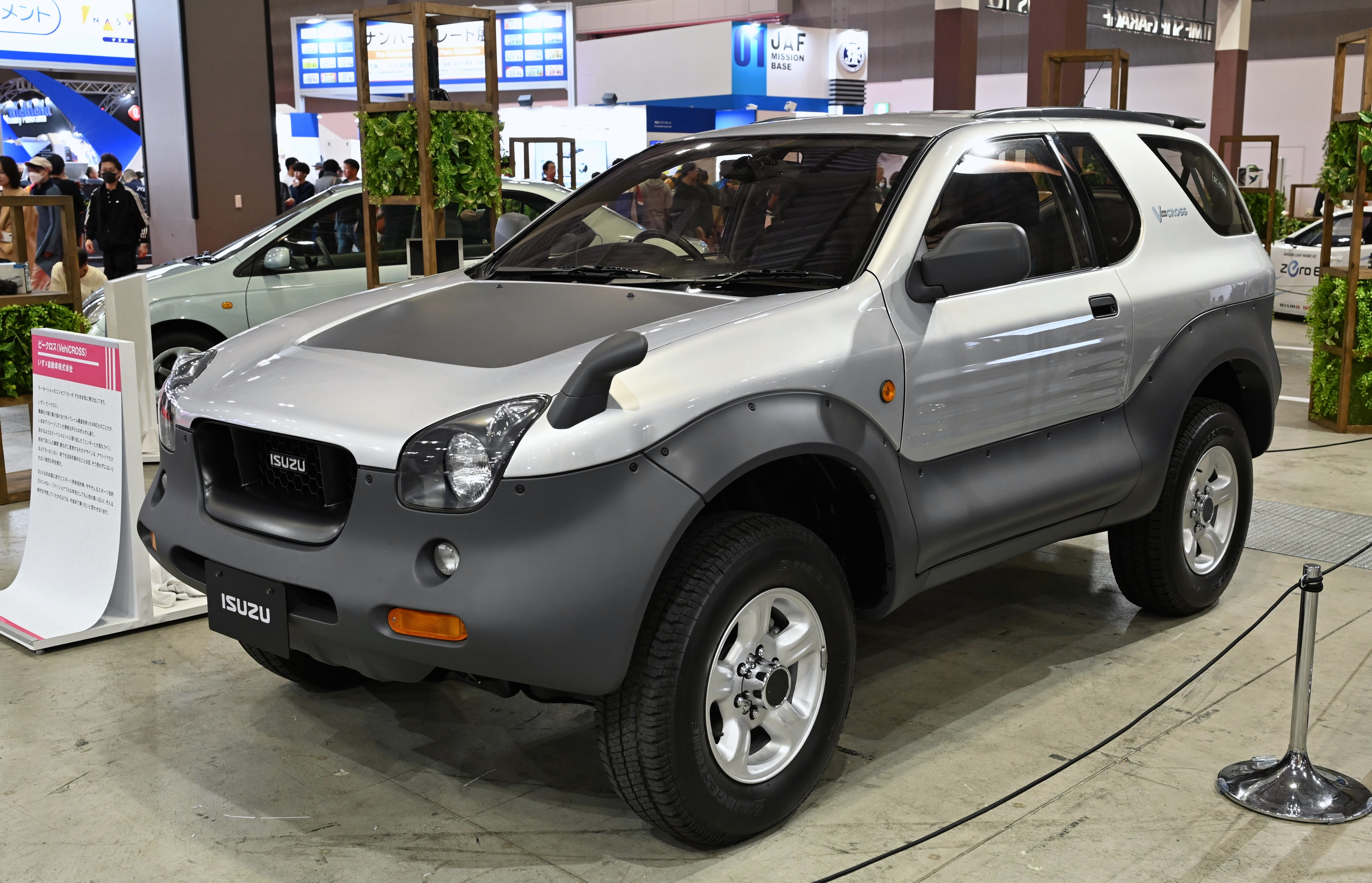
Isuzu VehiCROSS

The production version of the VehiCROSS was introduced to the US in 1999, but met with mixed reviews, as its high price tag, unique styling and two-door configuration did not seem to meet with market demands. Production of the VehiCROSS and other sport utility vehicles, including the Trooper, ended in 2001 as part of a major financial reorganization which eliminated almost 10,000 jobs. GM had been pushing the company to focus exclusively on producing commercial vehicles and engines.

The number of Isuzu dealerships in the US began a rapid decline, and by 2005 had only 2 models: the Ascender (a re-badged GMC Envoy) and the i-series pickup truck (a rebadged Chevrolet Colorado). At this point, Isuzu in the US was primarily a distributor of medium duty trucks such as the N-series, sourced both from Japan and US plants in Janesville, Wisconsin and Flint, Michigan. Isuzu had 290 light-vehicle dealers in the US in August 2006, and sold an average of just two Ascenders per dealer per month, and rumors of Isuzu's withdrawal from the US market were rampant. Plans to introduce a new Thai-built SUV for 2007 were shelved when Isuzu Motors Limited decided that a new SUV would be too risky, instead proceeding with the launch of the i-series trucks. Despite extremely low sales figures of 12,177 passenger vehicles for 2005 (with leftover Axiom and Rodeos making up 30% of this), Isuzu Motors America announced its first profit in years, mainly due to restructuring cuts.

In early 2002, Fuji Heavy Industries (Subaru's parent company) bought Isuzu's share of Lafayette, Indiana plant, and Subaru Isuzu Automotive (SIA) became Subaru of Indiana Automotive. After eight years of heavy Honda Passport sales and light Isuzu Oasis sales, Honda and Isuzu cooperatively ended their vehicle exchange agreement in 2001. The Oasis was dropped, and Honda replaced the Passport with the Pilot. Isuzu's last year for passenger vehicles in Canada was 2001, as Isuzus in Canada were mostly sold at Saturn-Saab dealerships. In late 2002 Isuzu initiated a recapitalization and debt-for-equity conversion plan to stave off a bankruptcy. GM acquired 20% of DMAX, 60% of Isuzu Motors Polska and Isuzu Motors Germany, and the rights to three types of diesel engine technology from Isuzu. by paying 50 billion yen (about US$425 million). GM also paid 10 billion yen (about US$85 million) for a 12% stake in the recapitalized company. GM wrote off its investment in Isuzu in 2001.

Production of the 7-passenger Ascender ended in February 2006 with the closure of GM's Oklahoma City Assembly plant, leaving Isuzu with the 5-passenger Ascender, built in Moraine, Ohio and the low-selling i-Series as its only retail products. The company sold just 1,504 vehicles in North America in the first two months of 2006. GM ended its equity investment in Isuzu and sold all its shares to Mitsubishi Corporation, Itochu and Mizuho Corporate Bank; both GM and Isuzu claimed the companies would continue their relationship, but there was no word as of 12 April 2006 on the effect this would have on DMAX operations.

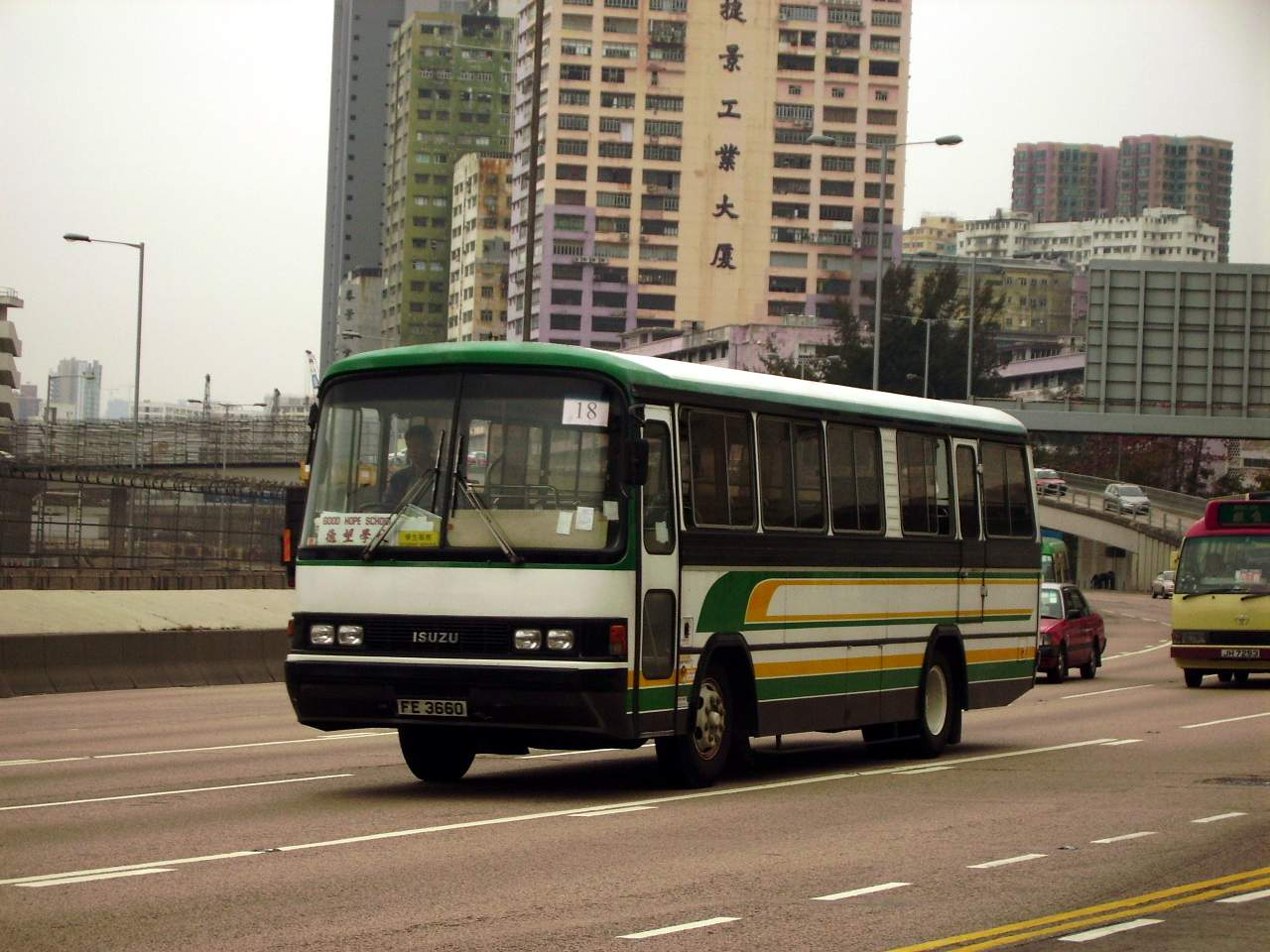
Isuzu LT132L on a Hong Kong motorway

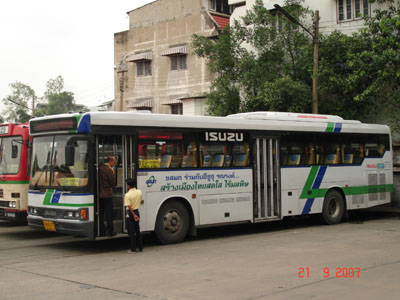
Isuzu LV486R CNG City Bus in Bangkok with the CNG-MPI Engine

In June 2006 Isuzu and GM agreed to establish a joint venture called "LCV Platform Engineering Corporation (LPEC)" to develop a new pickup. Isuzu said it would use its engineering expertise to develop the pickup and GM would develop derivatives based on the integrated platform. Mitsubishi Corp became Isuzu's largest shareholder in October 2006, after it converted all the preferred shares in Isuzu it had held since 2005 into common stock, increasing its shareholding from 3.5% to 15.65%.

In November 2006 Toyota purchased a 5.9% shareholding in Isuzu, becoming the third largest shareholder behind Itochu and Mitsubishi Corporation. The two companies agreed to study possible business collaboration focusing on the areas of R&D and production of diesel engines, related emissions-control, and other environmental technologies. In January 2007 Isuzu and General Motors updated the LCV range with a 3.0 litre common rail diesel engine that had far more torque and power than its predecessor. In August 2007 Isuzu and Toyota agreed to develop a 1.6-liter diesel engine for use in Toyota vehicles sold in European markets. At this point, details of development, production and supply of the diesel engine were still under discussion, but in principle, Isuzu would play the leading role, with production scheduled to begin around 2012.

On 30 January 2008, Isuzu announced its complete withdrawal from the US market, effective 31 January 2009. It would continue to provide support and parts. The decision was due to lack of sales. Some of the lack of sales was blamed on consumer experiences with low quality engines and service. Isuzu had been experiencing a slow decline since the late 1990s. In less than 10 years, they had gone from selling a complete line of cars, trucks, and SUVs, into being a specialized SUV maker, and finally selling only a pair of rebadged, General Motors Trucks. The company continued to sell commercial vehicles in the US.

Isuzu and Toyota shelved development of a clean diesel engine in December 2008.

On 29 January 2009, Isuzu and GM announced that they were in talks to transfer the operation of the medium-duty truck production line in Flint, Michigan to Isuzu for a five-year period. In June, however, GM announced that these talks failed to reach an agreement, and GM instead ceased production of the Chevrolet Kodiak and GMC Topkick vehicles on 31 July 2009.

In July 2016, Isuzu and Mazda agreed to collaborate to produce the next-generation pickup trucks for Mazda outside of North America. As a result, the third-generation Mazda BT-50 is built by Isuzu in Thailand since 2020.

Isuzu's plant in the Indian state of Andhra Pradesh began operations in 2016.

In August 2018, Toyota sold off its 5.9% stake in Isuzu.

In December 2019, Isuzu announced that it had signed a non-binding memorandum of understanding which would eventually see Volvo sell UD Trucks to them. In November 2020, the companies announced that they have signed the "final agreements", making the memorandum of understanding binding. In April 2021, Isuzu completed UD Trucks acquisition.

In March 2021, Isuzu, Hino, and Hino's parent Toyota announced the creation of a strategic partnership between the three companies. Toyota acquired a 4.6% stake in Isuzu while the latter plans to acquire Toyota shares for an equivalent value. The three companies said they would form a new joint venture by April called Commercial Japan Partnership Technologies Corporation with the aim of developing fuel cell and electric light trucks. Toyota would own an 80% stake in the venture while Hino and Isuzu would own 10% each.

== Leadership ==
- Goro Matsutaka (1937–1940)
- Shigeyasu Suzuki (1940–1942)
- Lin Gui (1942–1945)
- Yasushi Yuge (1945–1946)
- Goro Sannomiya (1946–1961)
- Naomichi Kusunoki (1961–1965)
- Hideyoshi Ohashi (1965–1970)
- Torao Aramaki (1970–1976)
- Toshio Okamoto (1976–1984)
- Kazuo Toyama (1984–1992)
- Seki Heihei (1992–1998)
- Inao Takeshi (1998–2000)
- Yoshinori Ida (2000–2007)
- Susumu Hosoi (2007–2015)
- Masanori Katayama (2015–2023)
- Shinsuke Minami (2023–2026)
- Masahiro Yamaguchi (2026–present)

== Market presence ==
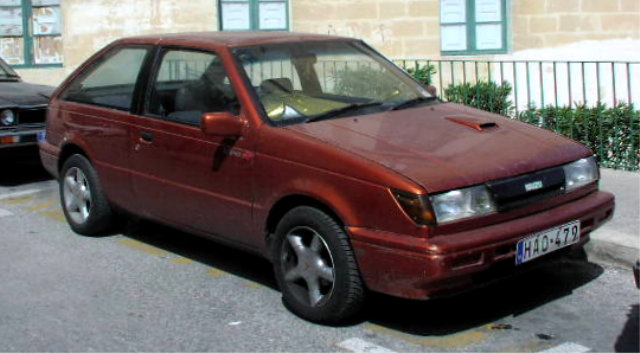
Isuzu Gemini with European (Maltese) registration plates

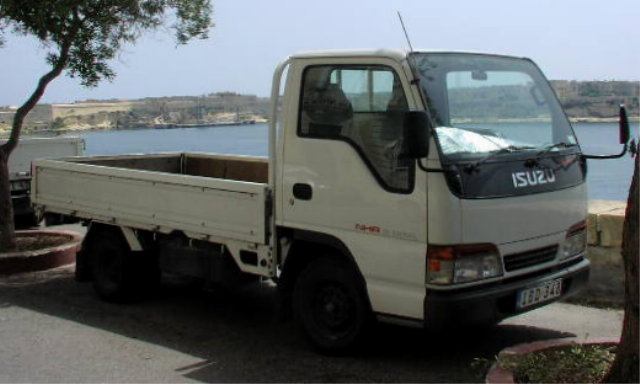
Isuzu NHR (Elf) light truck

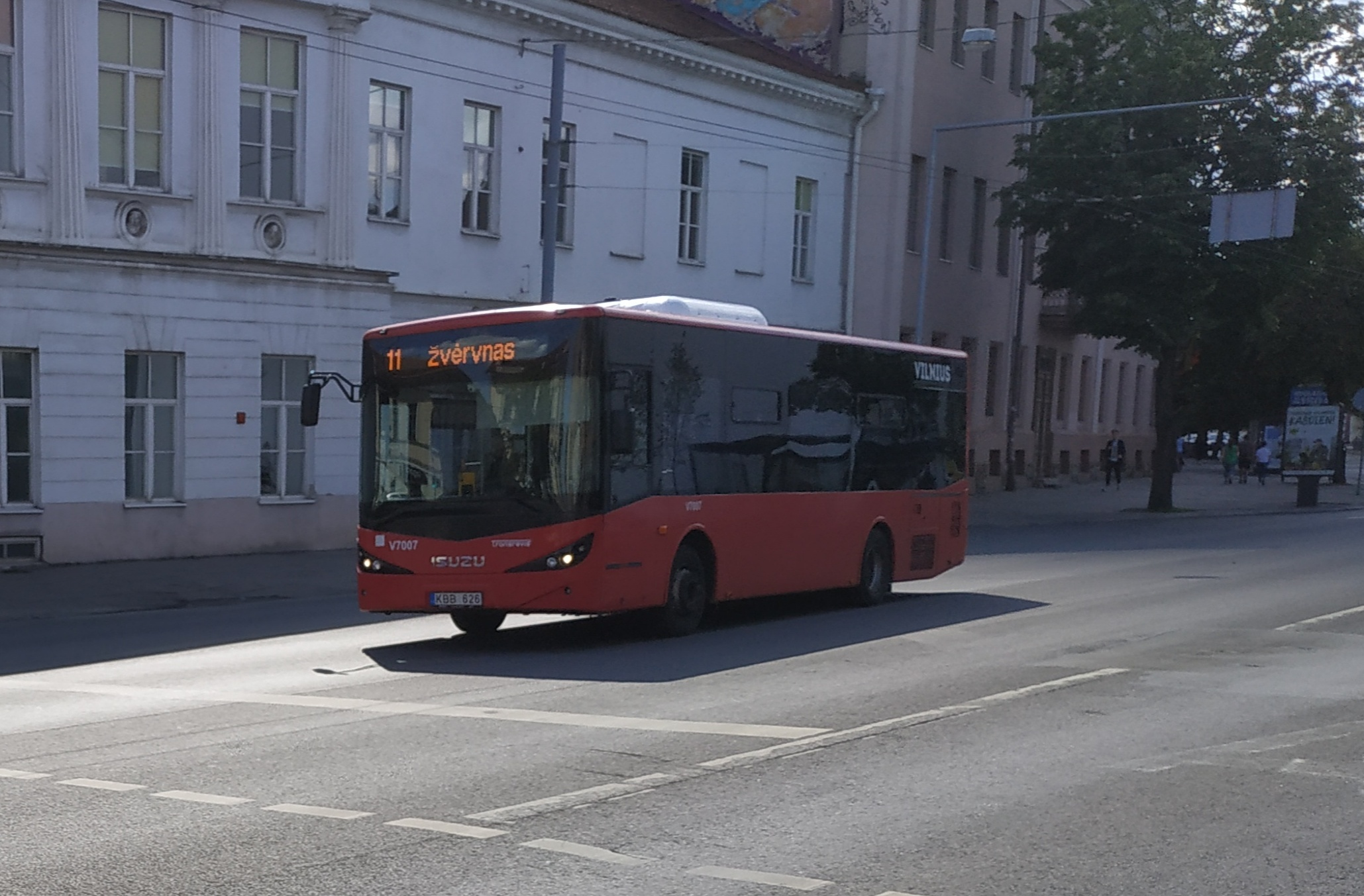
Isuzu NovoCiti Life serving in Vilnius public transport, Lithuania

In most of Asia and Africa, Isuzu is known primarily for trucks of all sizes, after Isuzu dropped all sales of sedans and compact cars in the late 1990s due to plummeting sales. In the days when Isuzu sold passenger cars, they were known for focusing on the diesel-engined niche. In 1983, for instance, long before the explosion in diesel sales, diesels represented 63.4% of their passenger car production. In 2009, Isuzu abandoned the United States consumer market due to lack of sales. Isuzu as a corporation has always been primarily a manufacturer of small to medium compact automobiles and commercial trucks of sizes medium duty and larger, but markets around the world show different needs.

Isuzu Motors America discontinued the sale of passenger vehicles in the United States on 31 January 2009. The company explained to its dealers that it had not been able to secure replacements for the Isuzu Ascender and Isuzu i-Series that would be commercially viable. Isuzu sold 7,098 cars in the year 2007. This action did not affect Isuzu's commercial vehicle or industrial diesel engine operations in the United States. Isuzu has a contract with Budget Truck Rental to manufacture their rental trucks, shared with Ford, GMC, and Navistar International.

In Australia, Isuzu was for many years a major supplier of light commercial and domestic vehicles to Holden (General Motors). However, by 2008, Holden was sourcing few Isuzus. At this time Isuzu began to sell the D-Max under the Isuzu name.

Isuzu's entry in the Thai market proved to be one of its most successful. Its presence in the country began in 1966 when it established a manufacturing facility for pick-up trucks in the Samuthprakarn province with a capacity of 155,000 units per year. The automaker quickly became a market leader so that by 2002, the company transferred its production base from its original location in Fujisawa, Japan to Thailand. Isuzu claimed the largest share of the Thai commercial vehicle market, outperforming its competitors for at least 23 years. By 2006, the company transferred to an industrial zone in Chachoengsao province to support further production expansion. By 2017, Isuzu has been exporting pick-up trucks, with shipments reaching North America, Latin America, Australia, and Japan. In the same year, it announced that its profit climbed 7 percent and has doubled its annual truck production to meet overseas demands.

== Subsidiaries and joint ventures ==
=== Japan ===
The Fujisawa Plant was built and opened for production November 1961. It is located at 8 Tsuchidana, Fujisawa, Kanagawa, and is still producing commercial vehicles for domestic Japanese use and international exports. The Toghichi Plant, located at Hakuchu, Ohira-Machi, Tochigi, Tochigi, is where the engines are currently built. There was a factory at Tono Machi, Kawasaki-ku, Kawasaki-shi, Kanagawa Pref. that closed March 2005 that manufactured passenger vehicles.

=== Mimamori-kun online service ===
Mimamori-kun, which means to watch, monitor, or observe in Japanese (literally "Mr. Watcher"), is a commercial vehicle telematics service developed by Isuzu Motors for monitoring and tracking commercial vehicle operations and movements in Japan. The service uses GPS radio tracking services, and began February 2004. It is connected to the internet and provides government mandated driver activity logs, and records how long the driver was on-duty and how much time was spent driving. The service also records when the driver took lunch breaks, where the truck stopped and for how long, and when the driver logged off for his duty shift.

The service has been modified for personal use in Japan to keep track of family members, to include the health status of elderly persons and pinpoint the location of children for safety purposes.

Some of the main features include the wireless Internet Digital Tachograph, the first of its kind in Japan, combined with hands-free communication, voice guidance, and text messages displayed from the dispatch office. The system also has a password-enabled vehicle theft prevention feature that will not let the vehicle start without the driver having entered a password.

=== International operations ===
- DMAX (engines) - former joint venture with General Motors in United States for production of diesel engines
- Ghandhara Industries - joint venture in Pakistan - trucks, buses
- Guangzhou Automobile Group Bus - joint venture in China - buses
- Industries Mécaniques Maghrébines - joint venture at Kairouan, Tunisia - trucks, SUVs
- Isuzu (Anadolu) - joint venture in Turkey - trucks, buses
- Isuzu Astra Motor Indonesia - joint venture in Indonesia - trucks, SUVs
- Isuzu HICOM Malaysia - joint venture in Malaysia - trucks, SUVs
- Isuzu Commercial Truck of America
- Isuzu Motors de México - joint venture in Mexico - trucks, buses
- Isuzu Motors Saudi Arabia - joint venture in Saudi Arabia - trucks, SUVs
- Isuzu Motors (Thailand) - joint venture in Thailand - trucks, SUVs
- Isuzu Motorsports - Australia
- Isuzu Philippines - joint venture in the Philippines - trucks, SUVs
- General Motors De Portugal-FMAT S.A. at Tramagal near Abrantes (Assembling company of all Bedford and Isuzu medium to heavy diesel trucks and 4X4 Pickup models since the 1960s then vehicles are sent for sale in Portugal and Spain)
- The assembling of Isuzu commercial trucks is carried out by the Az Universal Motors which is part of the AzGroup in Azerbaijan.
- Isuzu Truck (UK) - at the former IBC factory Luton, England - trucks, SUVs
- Isuzu Truck South Africa - joint venture in South Africa - trucks
- Isuzu Vietnam - joint venture in Vietnam - trucks, SUVs
- Jiangxi Isuzu - joint venture in China - trucks, SUVs
- Qingling Motors - joint venture in China - trucks, SUVs
- Sollers-Isuzu - joint venture in Russia - trucks (until July 2023)

=== Former international operations ===
- SML Mahindra - former joint venture in India, was known as Swaraj Mazda(until 2011) and SML Isuzu(2011-2025), interest sold to Mahindra & Mahindra
- Subaru of Indiana Automotive, Inc. - former joint venture in United States, interest sold to Subaru -

== Isuzu Diesel Engines / Power Train division ==
Diesel engines are a major part of the Isuzu Motor's business with over 20 million engines worldwide. The diesel power division, known as the PowerTrain Division, of Isuzu Motors America, is located in Plymouth, Michigan.

=== North American Master Distributors ===
- Southwest Products - Covering California, Nevada and Arizona.
- United Engines
- Mack Boring Parts
- M & L Engine

=== Isuzu Diesel powered equipment ===
==== Ag Equipment ====
- Harrington Seed Destructor

==== Construction equipment ====
- Paving equipment produced by CRAFCO. It manufacturers a variety of paving equipment that is powered by Isuzu diesel engines.

== Passenger, bus and commercial vehicles ==
Isuzu vehicles

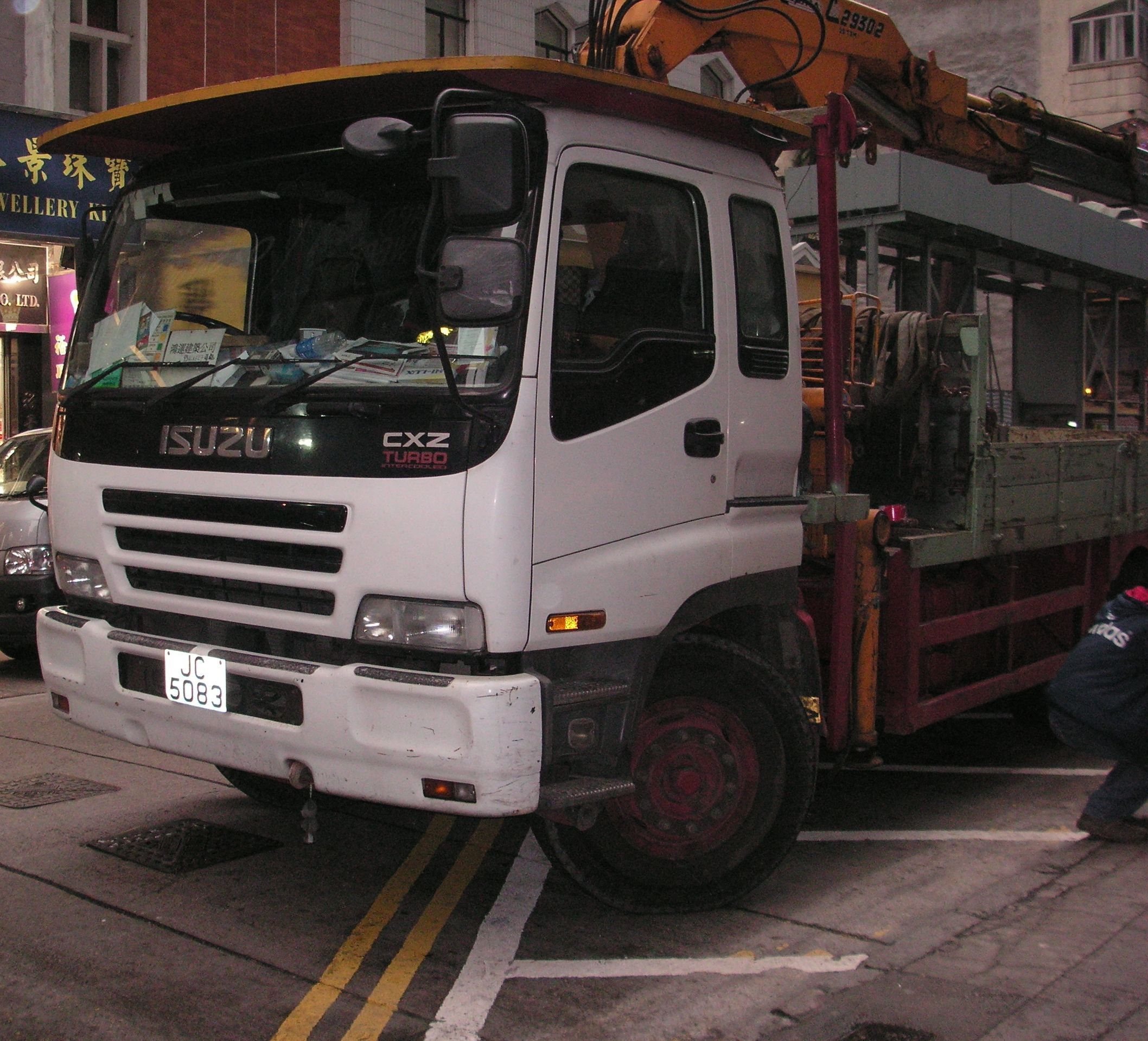
CXZ (Giga) heavy truck

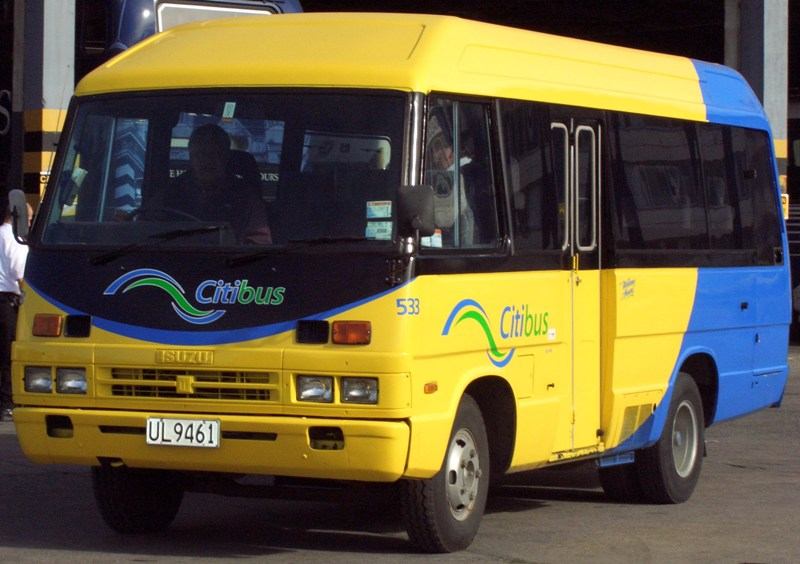
Journey operated by Citibus (New Zealand)

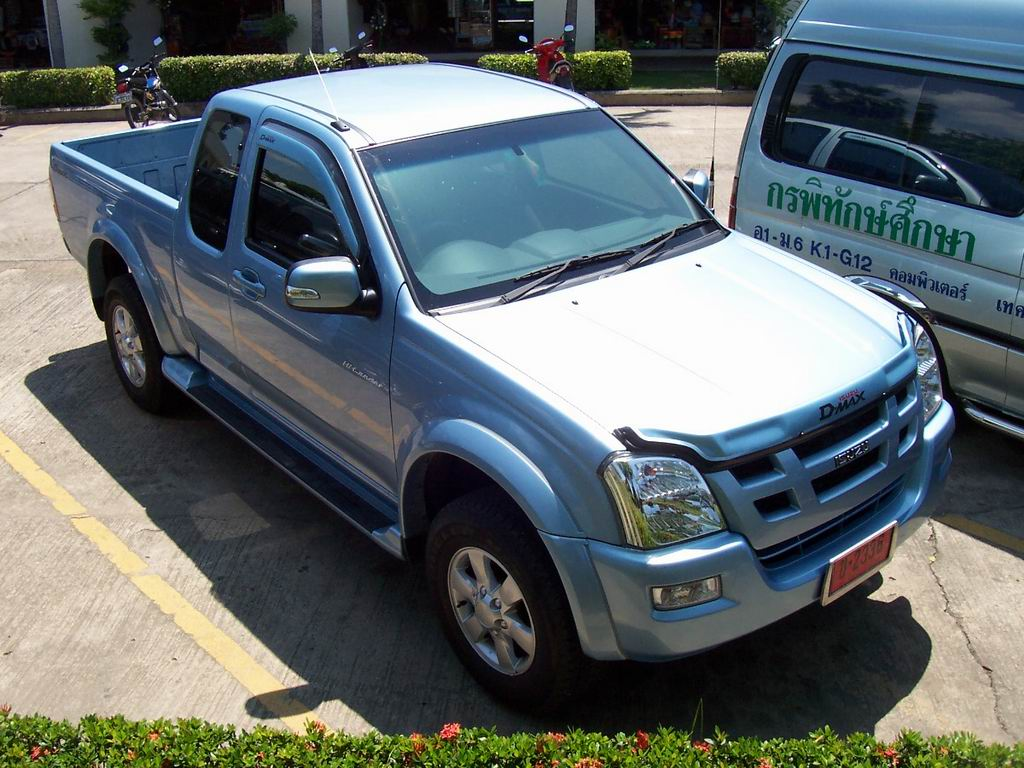
2005 D-max Spacecab Hi-lander in Thailand

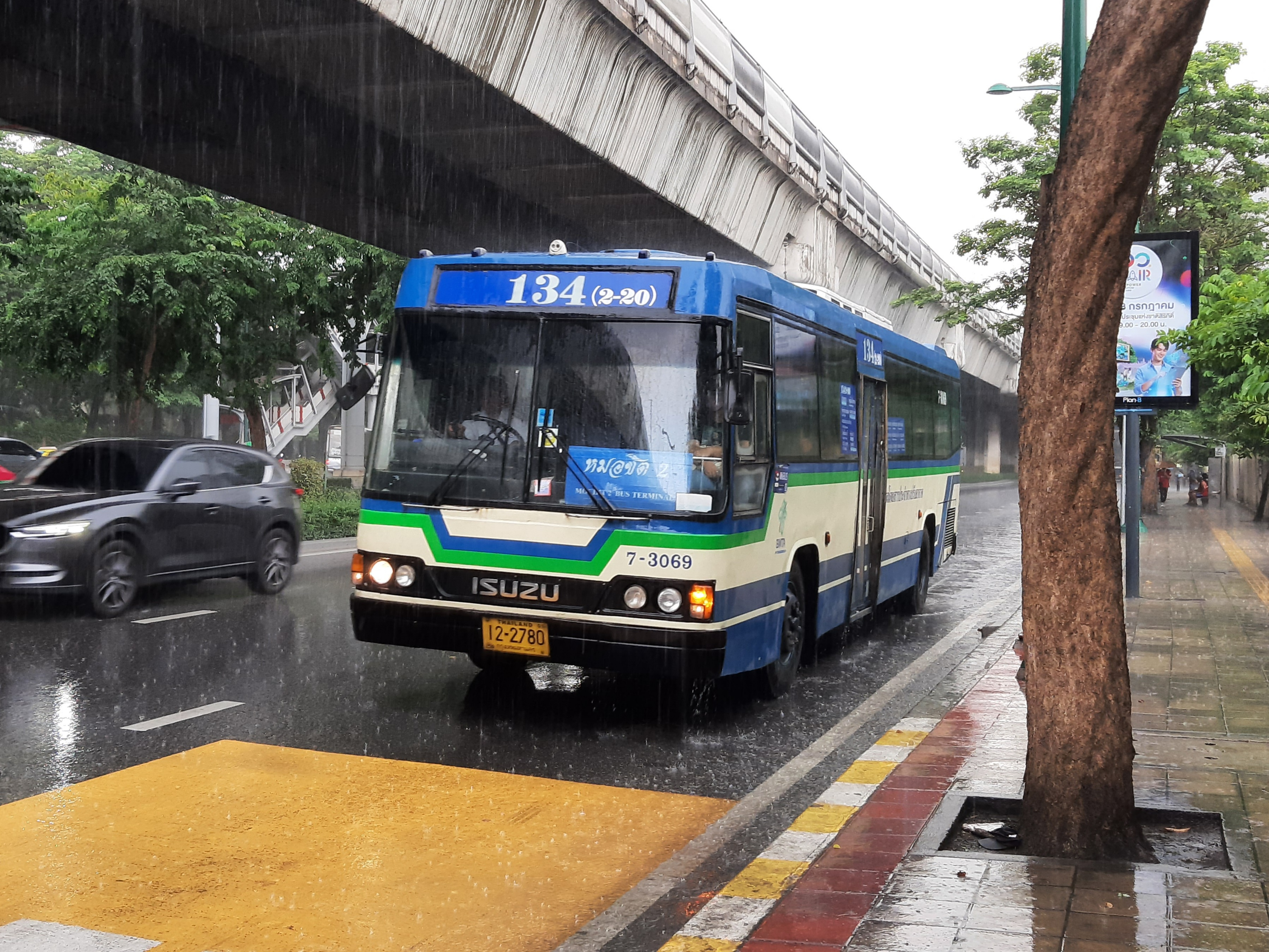
CQA650A/T

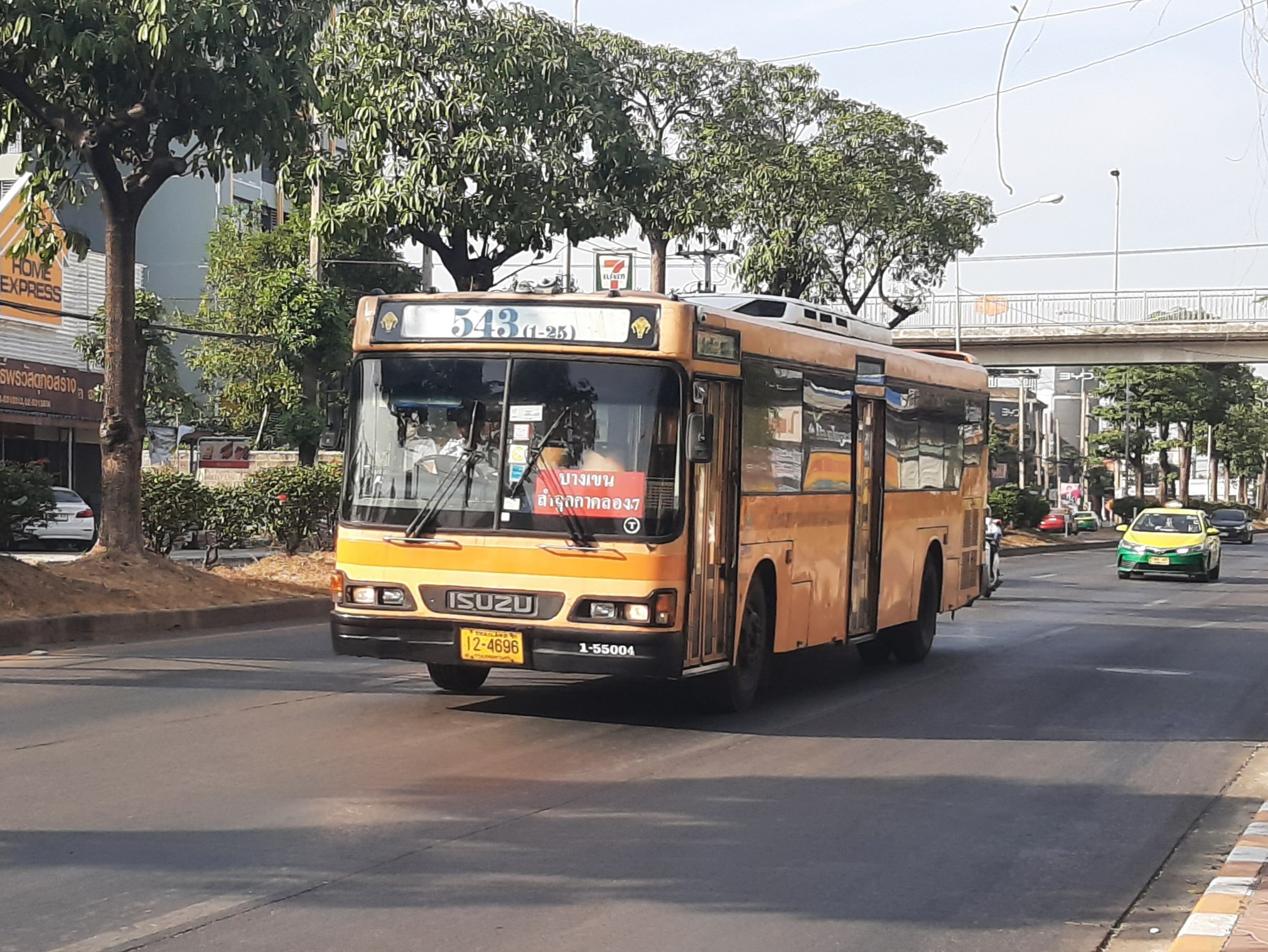
LV223S

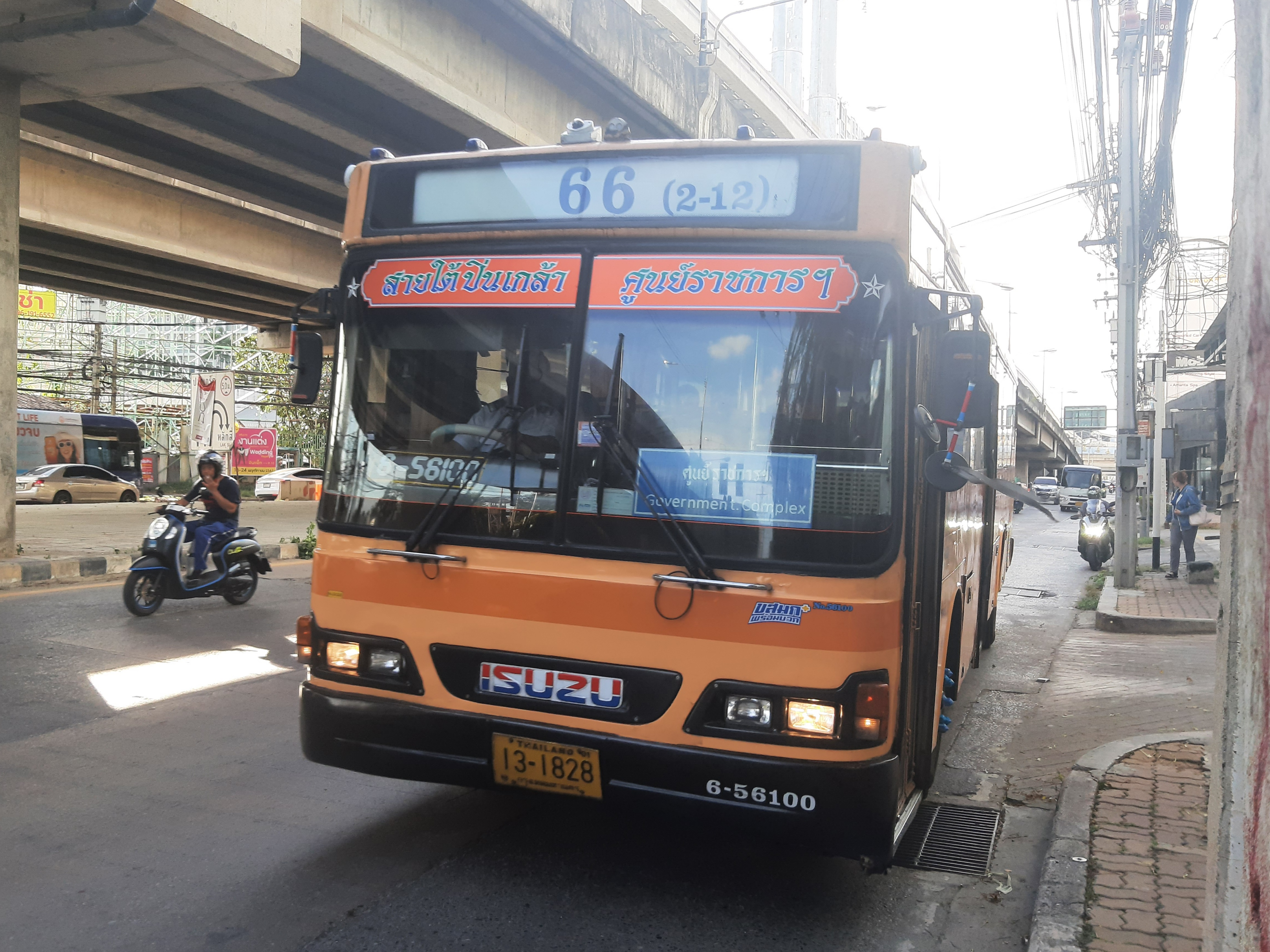
LV423R

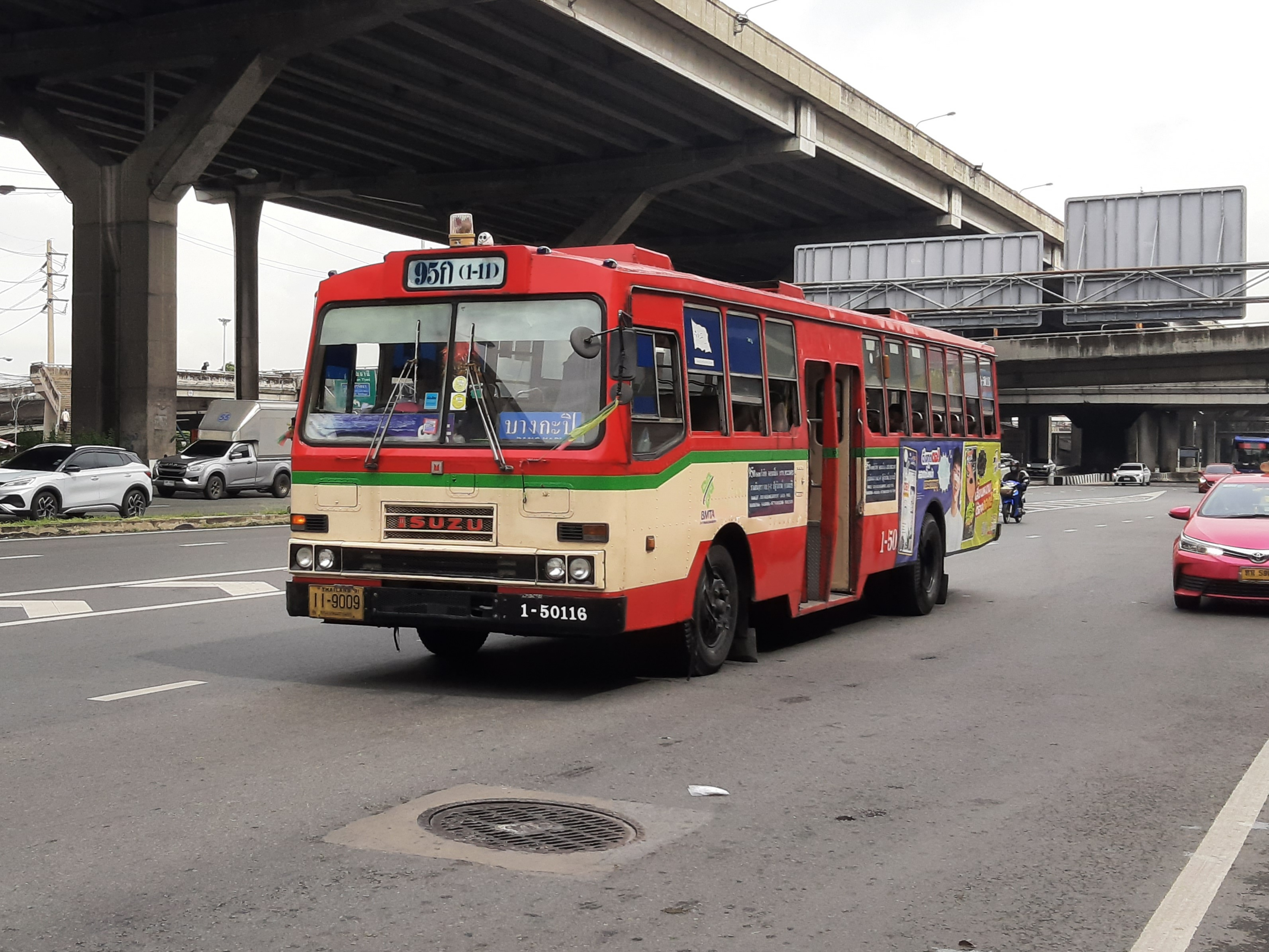
MT111QB

=== Current passenger vehicles ===
- 2002–present, D-Max - pickup truck, a top selling diesel sold in the majority of Isuzu markets (excluding Japan and North America).
- 2013–present MU-X - SUV, successor of Isuzu MU-7, developed from D-Max.

=== Current commercial vehicles ===
- Como - light commercial van (rebadged Nissan Caravan)
- Elf - light duty truck (N-series)
- Erga - low deck heavy duty bus
- Erga-J - heavy duty bus
- Erga Mio - low deck medium duty bus
- Forward - medium duty truck (F-series)
- Giga - heavy duty truck (C-series, E-series)
- Gala - heavy duty bus
- Gala Mio - medium duty bus
- Traga/Traviz - light commercial vehicle

==== UD Trucks vehicles ====
From April 2021 onwards, UD Trucks' products are part of the Isuzu company lineup.

=== Former passenger vehicles ===
- 1953–1962, Minx - sedan, Isuzu produced Hillman Minx under licence.
- 1961–1966, Bellel - sedan
- 1963–1973, Bellett - sedan (PR10/20) and coupe (PR90 and PR91)
- 1967–1983, Florian - sedan
- 1968–1981, 117 - coupe
- 1972–2002, Faster - pickup truck
- 1974–2000, Gemini/I-Mark/Stylus - sedan/coupe/hatchback
- 1981–1993, Piazza/Impulse/Storm - Hatchback
- 1983–2002, Aska - sedan
- 1983–2002, Trooper - midsize SUV
- 1986–1993, Geminett - hatchback/wagon, a rebadged first generation Suzuki Cultus (1986–1988) and then third generation Subaru Leone wagon as Geminett II (1988–1993).
- 1989–2004, Amigo/MU - Compact SUV, renamed to Rodeo Sport in 2001.
- 1991–2004, Rodeo/Wizard - midsize SUV, also rebadged as the Honda Passport.
- 1996–1999, Oasis - minivan, a rebadged Honda Odyssey.
- 1996–2000, Hombre - pickup truck, a rebadged Chevrolet S10.
- 1996–2001, Vertex - sedan, a rebadged Honda Integra SJ.
- 1997–2002, Filly, a rebadged Nissan Elgrand - minivan
- 1999–2001, VehiCROSS - SUV
- 2001–2004, Axiom - midsize SUV
- 2002–2008, Ascender - midsize SUV, a rebadged GMC Envoy.
- 2006–2008, i-series - pickup truck - a product of the co-developed GMT355 platform that Isuzu sells overseas.
- 2004–2013, MU-7 - midsize SUV, developed from D-Max platform that was on sale only in Thailand, Philippines, India and China.
- 1991–2020, Panther - van and pickup truck, sold as the Isuzu Hi-Lander/Crosswind in the Philippines, also sold throughout the ASEAN, and in India as the Chevrolet Tavera.

=== Former commercial vehicles ===
- Bison - light commercial pickup truck, a rebadged second generation Mitsubishi Delica pickup truck for Indonesian market (not related to fourth generation Isuzu Elf that was sold under Bison name in Indonesia in the early 1990s).
- Fargo - light commercial van
- H-Series - heavy duty truck in United States only (rebadged from GMC Topkick and Chevrolet Kodiak).
- Journey - light duty bus
- Journey-J - medium duty bus
- Reach - commercial van offering over 35 percent better fuel efficiency, assembled by Utilimaster Corporation.

=== Race cars ===
- 1969 Isuzu R7, Group 7 - racecar
- 1970 Isuzu Bellett R6, Group 6 - racecar

=== Concept cars ===
- 1969 Isuzu Bellett MX1600
- 1979 Isuzu Asso di Fiori
- 1983 Isuzu COA
- 1985 Isuzu COA II
- 1987 Isuzu COA III, AWD mid-engine coupe.
- 1987 Isuzu Zero Door
- 1989 Isuzu Costa
- 1989 Isuzu MultiCROSS
- 1989 4200R
- 1991 Isuzu Como F1, a pickup-style crossover with a Lotus Formula One engine (the name was later used for the rebadged Nissan Caravan produced from 2001).
- 1991 Isuzu Nagisa
- 1991 Isuzu Terraza
- 1993 Isuzu XU-1
- 1993 Isuzu VehiCROSS
- 1995 Isuzu Deseo
- 1995 Isuzu Aisance
- 1997 Isuzu VX-2
- 1997 Isuzu ZACCAR
- 1999 Isuzu VX-O_{2}
- 1999 Isuzu Kai
- 1999 ZXS
- 2000 Isuzu VX-4
- 2001 Isuzu Zen
- 2001 Isuzu GBX
- 2001 Isuzu Axiom XSF
- 2002 Isuzu Axiom XSR
- 2002 Isuzu Axiom XST
- 2011 Isuzu T-Next
- 2020 Isuzu FLIR
- 2025 Isuzu Dragon Max

=== Buses (Philippines) ===
- LV314K
- LV314L
- CJM470
- CJM500
- LT132
- LV423
- LV123
- PABFTR33PLB
- FTR33P
- FTR45
- PABFVR33P

=== Buses (Thailand) ===
- CQM275hp
- CQA650A/T
- JCR600YZNN
- LT112P
- LV223S
- LV423R
- LV486R
- LV771
- MT111L
- MT111QB

=== Buses (Ukraine) ===
- Bogdan buses - sold under Isuzu brand outside Ukraine

== Military vehicles ==
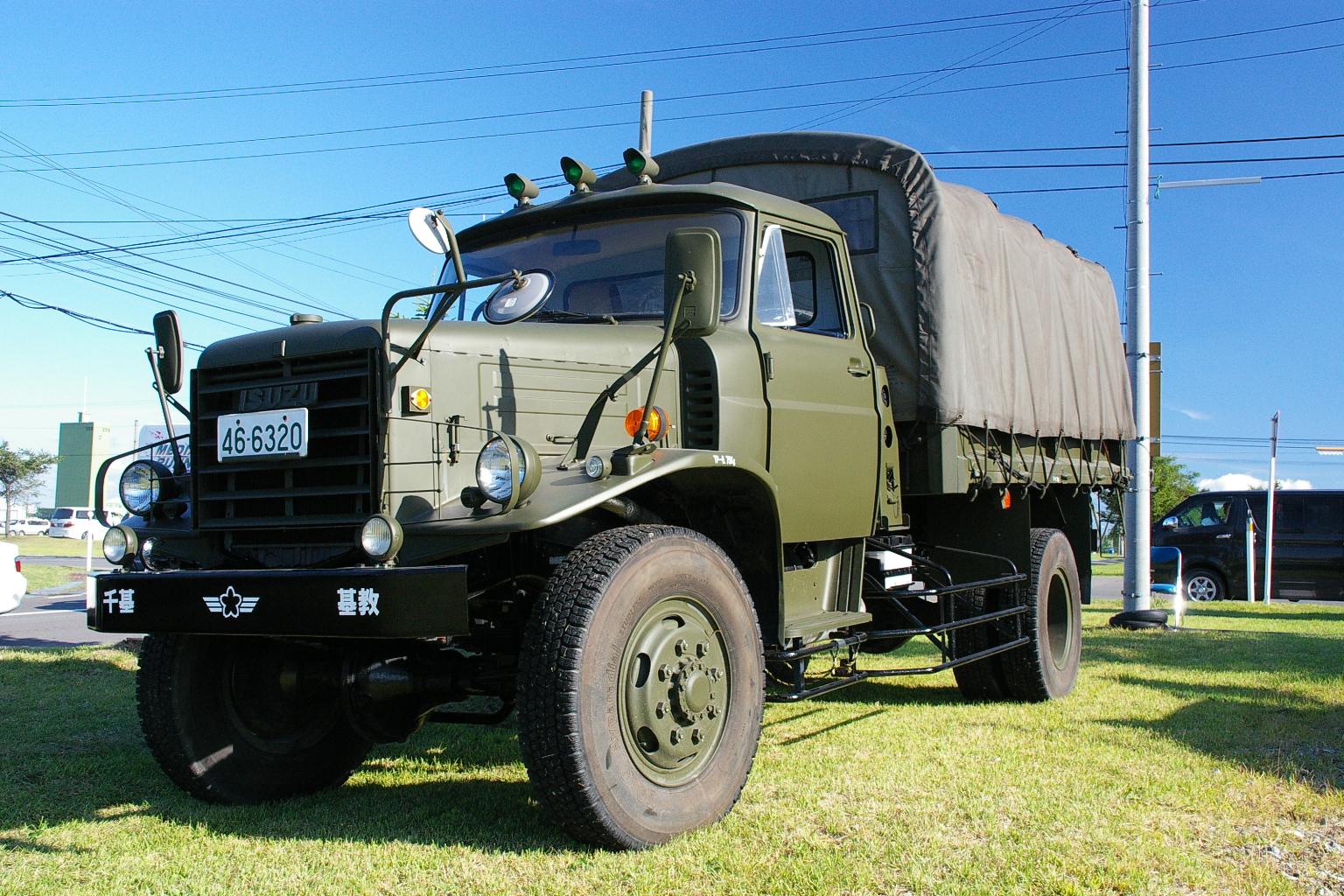
Isuzu HTS12G 2.5 ton truck

- Isuzu TW340 medium truck
- Isuzu TWD20/25 medium truck
- Isuzu TSD45/TSD55 medium truck
- Isuzu HTS12G 2.5 ton truck
- Isuzu Type 73 Heavy Truck

== Sponsorship ==
As of 2017, Isuzu has been the shirt sponsor of the Wales Rugby Union sports team in the UK (Europe). The contract was renewed during 2023, until 2025.

== See also ==
- List of automobile manufacturers
