= Isuzu Philippines =

Filipino subsidiary of automobile manufacturer Isuzu

Isuzu Philippines Corporation
- Type: Subsidiary
- Industry: Manufacturing
- Founded: August 7, 1995; 31 years ago
- Headquarters: 114 Technology Avenue, Phase 2, Laguna Technopark, Biñan, Laguna 4024
- Key people: Mikio Tsukui (President)
- Products: Commercial vehicles, trucks and bus chassis
- Owner: Isuzu (35%), Mitsubishi Motors Philippines (35%), Ayala Holdings (15%), Rizal Commercial Banking Corp. (15%)
- Website: www.isuzuphil.com

Isuzu Philippines Corporation (IPC) is a subsidiary of the Japanese commercial vehicle manufacturer Isuzu with headquarters in Biñan, Laguna, Philippines. The company was formed on August 7, 1995 with an investment of ₱1 million. The company operates as a joint venture with Mitsubishi Motors Philippines Corporation (MMPC), with each holding 35%. Other shareholders, with a share of 30%, include the Ayala Corporation and the Yuchengco Group of Companies.

== History ==
Isuzu's Philippine debut came in the 1950s through its line of trucks. In 1972, General Motors and Isuzu formed a joint venture during the 1970s to create GM Philippines. More changes in management took place in the two decades that followed, leading to the creation of Isuzu Motors Pilipinas in 1989 as a subsidiary of Isuzu Motors Ltd. To pave the way for a new joint venture, the company ceased its operations in 1995. On August 7, 1995, Isuzu Philippines Corporation was formed. The company’s manufacturing facilities is located on industrial land located at the Laguna Technopark in Biñan, Laguna. Isuzu Philippines Corporation annually produces 8,000 to 15,000 vehicles. Directly adjacent to the plant are the works of Isuzu Autoparts Manufacturing Corporation, which produces transmissions.

In 1996, production began with the Hilander, the N-Series and the Forward. In 1997, the Fuego was introduced. A year later came the Trooper. In late 2003, the D-Max was unveiled, and in 2005 followed its sport utility vehicle variant, the Alterra. In 2007, the company offered the Isuzu NHR-PV, a 17-seater light commercial vehicle which is built on the N-Series chassis. On September 18, 2013, Isuzu debuted the second generation D-Max. Initially imported from Thailand, the second generation D-Max was assembled in Isuzu Philippines' Laguna plant from October 2013 until July 2019, in favor of re-importing D-Max from Thailand. In 2014, the MU-X was introduced, replacing Alterra. In 2019, the Traviz was introduced.

== Current models ==
- Isuzu C/E-Series (1995–Present) - Locally produced
- Isuzu D-Max (2003–Present) - Locally produced until 2019 then imported from Thailand
- Isuzu F-Series (1996–Present) - Locally produced
- Isuzu MU-X (2014–Present) - Imported from Thailand
- Isuzu N/Q-Series (1996–Present) - Locally produced
- Isuzu Traviz (2019–Present) - Imported from Indonesia

== Former models ==
The list only include vehicles that were sold after the brand's return in the Philippines in 1995.

- Isuzu Alterra (2005–2014) - Locally produced
- Isuzu Crosswind (1997–2017) - Locally produced
- Isuzu Fuego (1997–2005) - Locally produced
- Isuzu Trooper (1996–2005) - Locally produced

== Buses and PUV ==
- FVR34P
- FTR33P
- LV123
- LV423
- NQR
- QKR77
- Marcopolo Viaggio and Paradiso line (G7, G8 (800-1200); Isuzu Marcopolo)
- NPR66 (4HF1/4HG1 Front-engine Turismo; a.k.a, Ônibus Frontal)
