= Isuzu Astra Motor Indonesia =

Automobile manufacturing company of Indonesia

PT Isuzu Astra Motor Indonesia
- Founded: May 3, 1974: PT Pantja Motor; April 2008: PT Isuzu Astra Motor Indonesia
- Headquarters: Jakarta, Indonesia
- Key people: Prijono Sugiarto (President); Johannus Nangoi (Representative Director)
- Production output: automobiles, trucks
- Website: www.isuzu-astra.com

Isuzu Astra Motor Indonesia (IAMI) is a joint venture automobile and commercial vehicle manufacturer with headquarters in Jakarta, Indonesia. The company was founded in April 2008 and is the successor of the previous Isuzu manufacturer, Pantja Motor, founded in May 1974.

After nearly two years of construction, the new plant was opened in the summer of 1976. Isuzu Gemini was the entry-level model. In the commercial vehicle sector, it ranked the brand new model of Isuzu Elf and the Isuzu Forward, here ever since sold as the Isuzu Borneo. The first SUV was manufactured in 1980, Isuzu P'up, a sister model of the Japanese Isuzu Faster.

The Isuzu Trooper, which since 1988 in Indonesia has been built. On the local market, the Isuzu Panther was a direct competitor for the Toyota Kijang. In the commercial vehicle sector in 1997, then the Isuzu C series was included. This is the only heavy-duty truck model of Isuzu's in the Indonesian market.

Isuzu Astra Motor Indonesia has a 33.7% stake of PT. Mesin Isuzu Indonesia (MII), a Bekasi based company that manufactures and distribute diesel engines and related parts.

== Current models ==
- Isuzu Giga (1976–present)
- Isuzu Elf (1976–present)
- Isuzu D-Max (2009–present, Thailand-sourced)
- Isuzu MU-X (2014–present, Thailand-sourced)
- Isuzu Traga (2018–present)

== Former models ==
- Isuzu Gemini (1976–1986, Japan-sourced)
- Isuzu P'up (1980–1990)
- Isuzu Florian (1983–1989, Japan-sourced)
- Isuzu Trooper (1984–1995)
- Isuzu Panther (1991–2020)
- Isuzu Pickup (1991–2020)
- Isuzu Bison (2010–2018, consignation from Mitsubishi Motors)
