= Isuzu Panther =

Multi-purpose vehicle and pickup truck manufactured by Isuzu

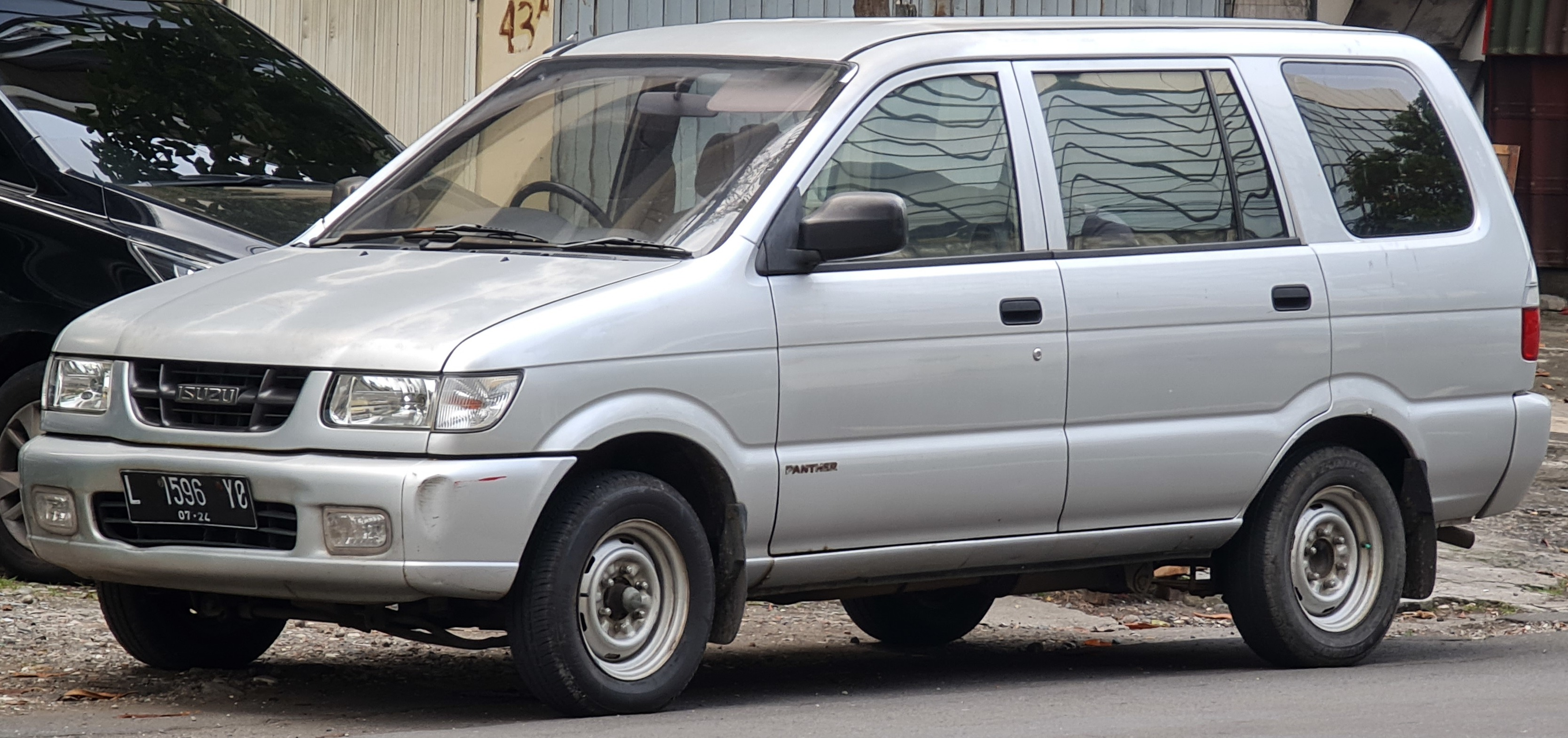
- 2004 Isuzu Panther LM 2.5 (TBR541, Indonesia)

Overview
- Manufacturer: Isuzu
- Also called: Isuzu Hi-Lander (Philippines and Vietnam); Isuzu Crosswind (Philippines); Isuzu Pickup (first generation, pickup, Indonesia); Chevrolet Tavera (India and Indonesia)
- Production: 1991–2020; 433,117 sold (Indonesia)

Body and chassis
- Class: Compact station wagon; Compact pickup truck
- Body style: 5-door wagon; 2-door pickup truck
- Layout: Front-engine, rear-wheel-drive; Front-engine, four-wheel-drive
- Chassis: Body-on-frame
- Related: Isuzu Faster; Isuzu MU; Isuzu D-Max

Chronology
- Successor: Isuzu D-Max (pickup truck); Isuzu Traga (pickup truck); Isuzu MU-X (SUV)

The Isuzu Panther (Also known as Isuzu Crosswind/Crosswind Sportivo) is a series of station wagons and pickup trucks manufactured by Isuzu from 1991 until 2020 mainly for the Southeast Asian market. The second generation Panther was also manufactured and marketed in India under the name Chevrolet Tavera, a name which is also used in Indonesia for the petrol version until 2005. It was developed together with General Motors as the "160 Project".

The model is suited to carrying large loads of passengers or cargo. It was developed to meet local conditions in terms of climate, roads and family structure as a durable vehicle. The Panther was also known in the Philippines and Vietnam as the Hi-Lander, later in the Philippines as the Crosswind.

== First generation (TBR12/30/52/54; 1991) ==
First generation (TBR12/30/52/54)
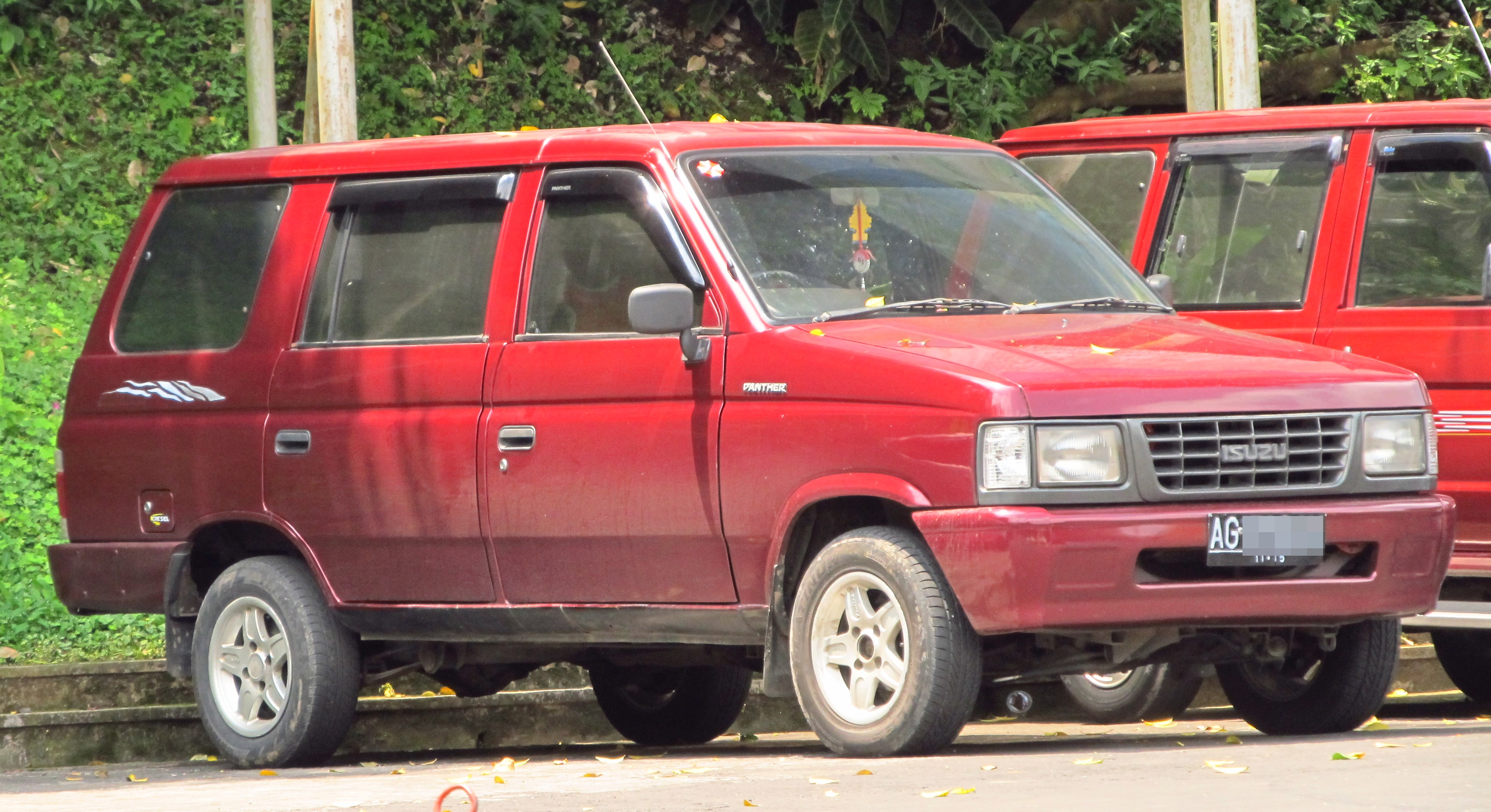
- 1997 Isuzu Panther Royale 2.5 (TBR54; first facelift, Indonesia)

Overview
- Also called: Isuzu Hi-Lander; Isuzu Pickup
- Production: 1991–2000 (station wagon, Indonesia); 1991–2020 (pickup truck, Indonesia); 1997–2000 (station wagon, Philippines)
- Assembly: Indonesia: Sunter, Jakarta (Pantja Motor); Philippines: Biñan, Laguna (IPC); Taiwan: Taichung (Taiwan Isuzu Motors)

Body and chassis
- Class: Compact station wagon Compact pickup truck
- Body style: 5-door wagon 2-door pickup truck
- Related: Isuzu Faster; Isuzu MU

Powertrain
- Engine: Petrol: 2.0 L 4ZC1 I4 (TBR12); 2.2 L GM Family II I4 (TBR30); Diesel: 2.2 L C223 Indirect injection I4 (TBR52); 2.5 L 4JA1 Direct injection I4 (TBR54); 2.5 L 4JA1-L DI low-pressure turbo-diesel I4 (TBR54; pickup)
- Transmission: 5-speed manual MSG5K; 4-speed automatic

Dimensions
- Wheelbase: 2,480 mm (97.6 in) (SWB); 2,680 mm (105.5 in) (LWB)
- Length: 4,160 mm (163.8 in) (SWB truck); 4,205 mm (165.6 in) (SWB wagon); 4,360 mm (171.7 in) (LWB truck & SWB wagon "Sporty"); 4,405 mm (173.4 in) (LWB wagon); 4,490 mm (176.8 in) (LWB wagon "Hi Sporty"); 4,655 mm (183.3 in) (LWB truck "GD 3-Way")
- Width: 1,650 mm (65.0 in) (truck & standard wagon); 1,740 mm (68.5 in) (LWB wagon "Hi Grade" facelift); 1,787 mm (70.4 in) (LWB wagon "Hi Sporty"); 1,820 mm (71.7 in) (LWB truck "GD 3-Way")
- Height: 1,725 mm (67.9 in) (truck & SWB wagon "Sporty"); 1,770 mm (69.7 in) (standard wagon); 1,790 mm (70.5 in) (truck "GD 3-Way"); 1,818 mm (71.6 in) (LWB wagon "Hi Grade" facelift); 1,826 mm (71.9 in) (LWB wagon "Hi Sporty")
- Curb weight: 1,130–1,240 kg (2,491–2,734 lb) (truck); 1,300–1,330 kg (2,866–2,932 lb) (wagon)

The first generation Panther was introduced in 1991 in Indonesia as a pickup truck and a coachbuilder-made station wagon in short and long body with the 2.3 L C223 diesel engine, which is also used on the Chevrolet Trooper. The differences between short wheelbase and long wheelbase are 200 mm in length. The Isuzu Total Assy station wagon version, which is assembled by PT Pulogadung Pawitra Laksana (a subsidiary of Astra International) in Sunter, North Jakarta, was introduced in 1992, and it is available in Special, Deluxe, Grand Deluxe, Royal Hi-GLX and Hi Grade trim levels.

In 1996, the first generation Panther received a restyled headlamps, redesigned front grille and the 2.5 L Direct Injection 4JA1 diesel engine, and the station wagon version is available in New Super, Deluxe, Royale, Grand Royale, Sporty, Hi Sporty and Hi Grade trim levels. The Sporty and Hi Sporty trims have sporty body kit and two-tone exterior color option. The Hi Sporty and Hi Grade trims have higher ground clearance. In 1999, the Royale and Grand Royale trims were both replaced with the New Royale trim with fog lamp covers.

After the second generation Panther station wagon was introduced, the first generation Panther pickup truck continued to be produced and sold until 2020. The first generation Panther pickup truck is available in Standard, Flat Deck and GD 3-Way. The front grille of the first generation Panther pickup truck was facelifted twice, in 2005 and 2009. The headlights were then changed into the crystal multi-reflector headlights. In 2007, the first generation Panther pickup truck was rebranded as the Isuzu Pickup and has been given a turbocharger to meet Euro 2 emission standards.

=== Gallery ===
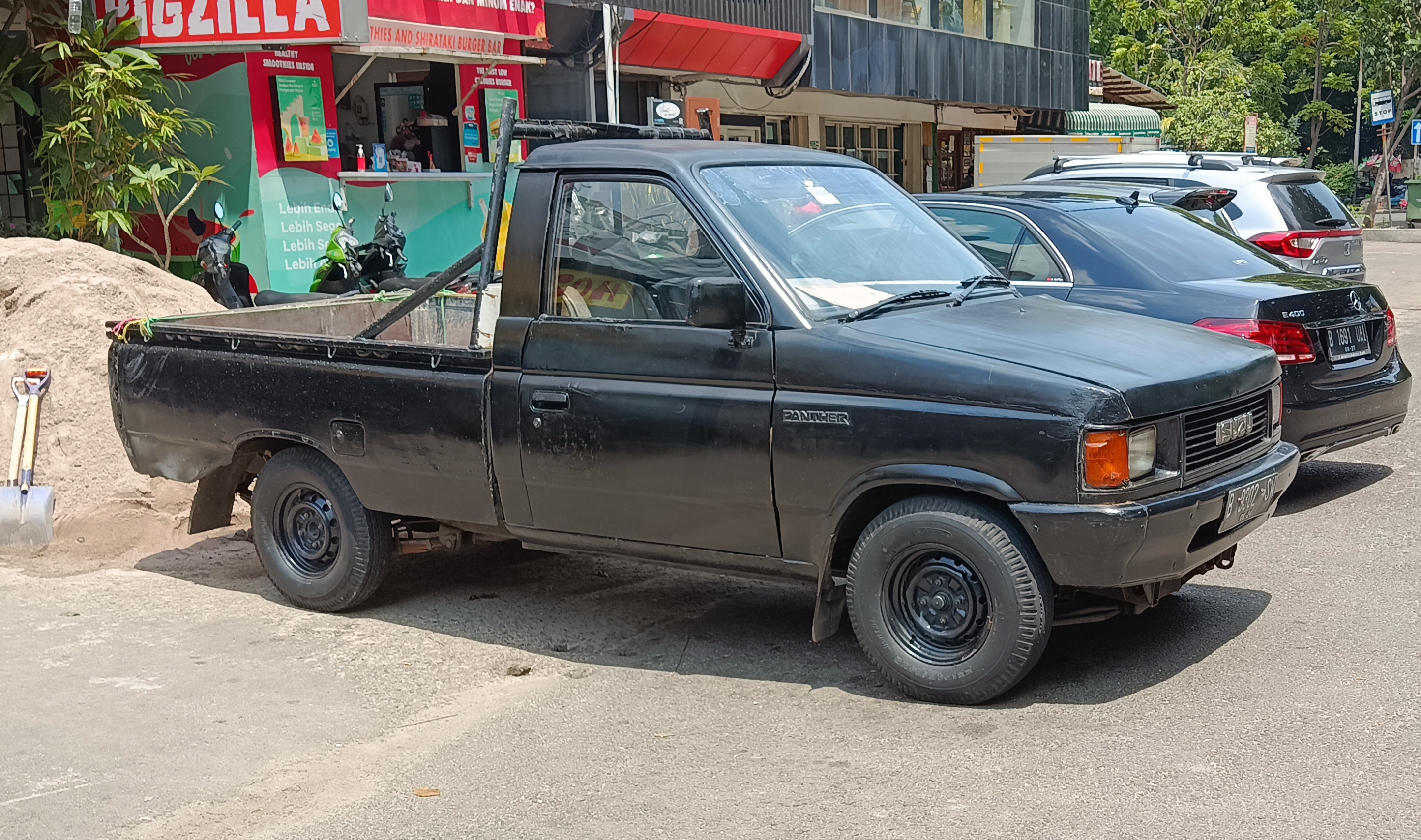
1994 Isuzu Panther 2.2 pickup truck (TBR52; pre-facelift, Indonesia)

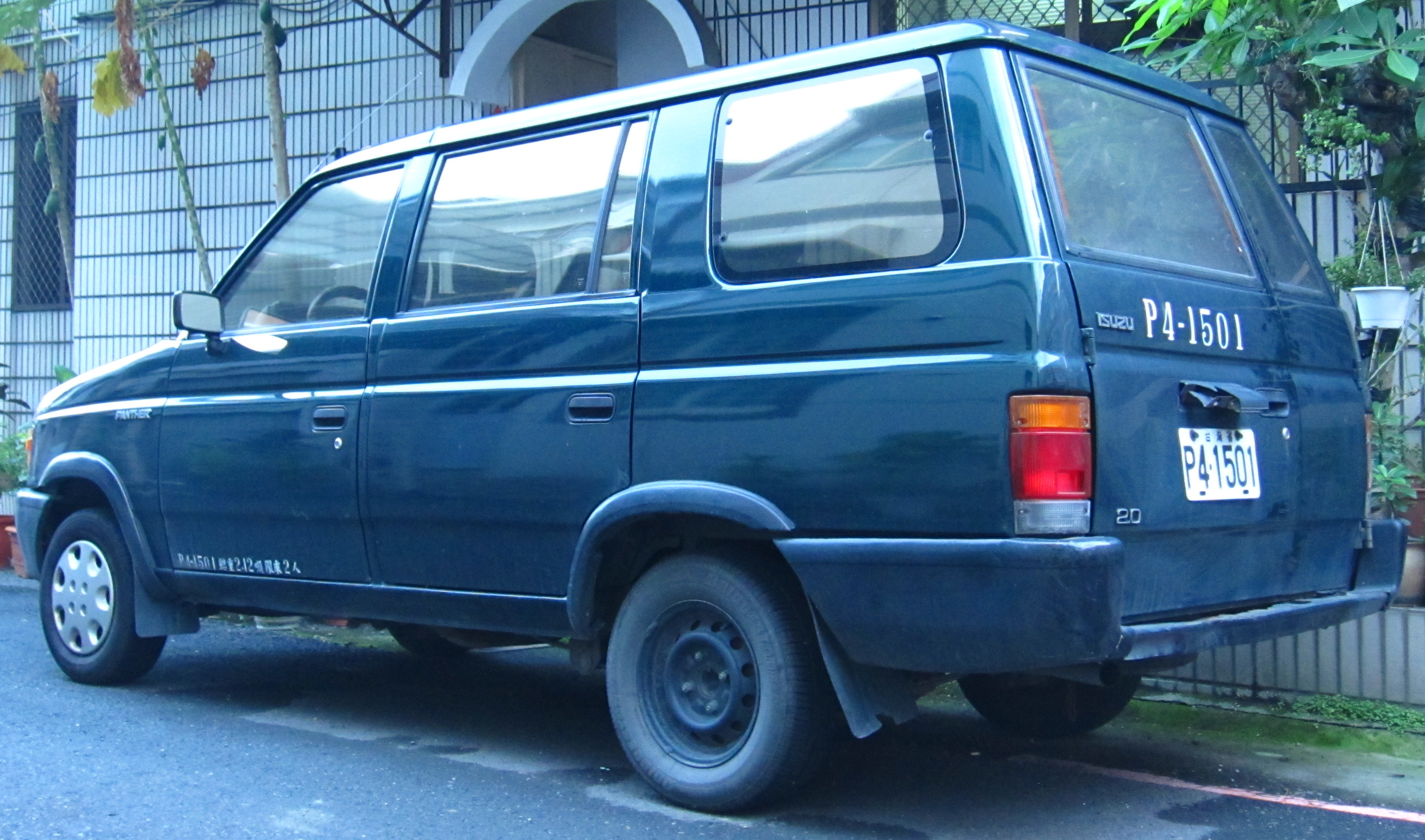
Isuzu Panther 2.0 (TBR12; facelift, Taiwan)

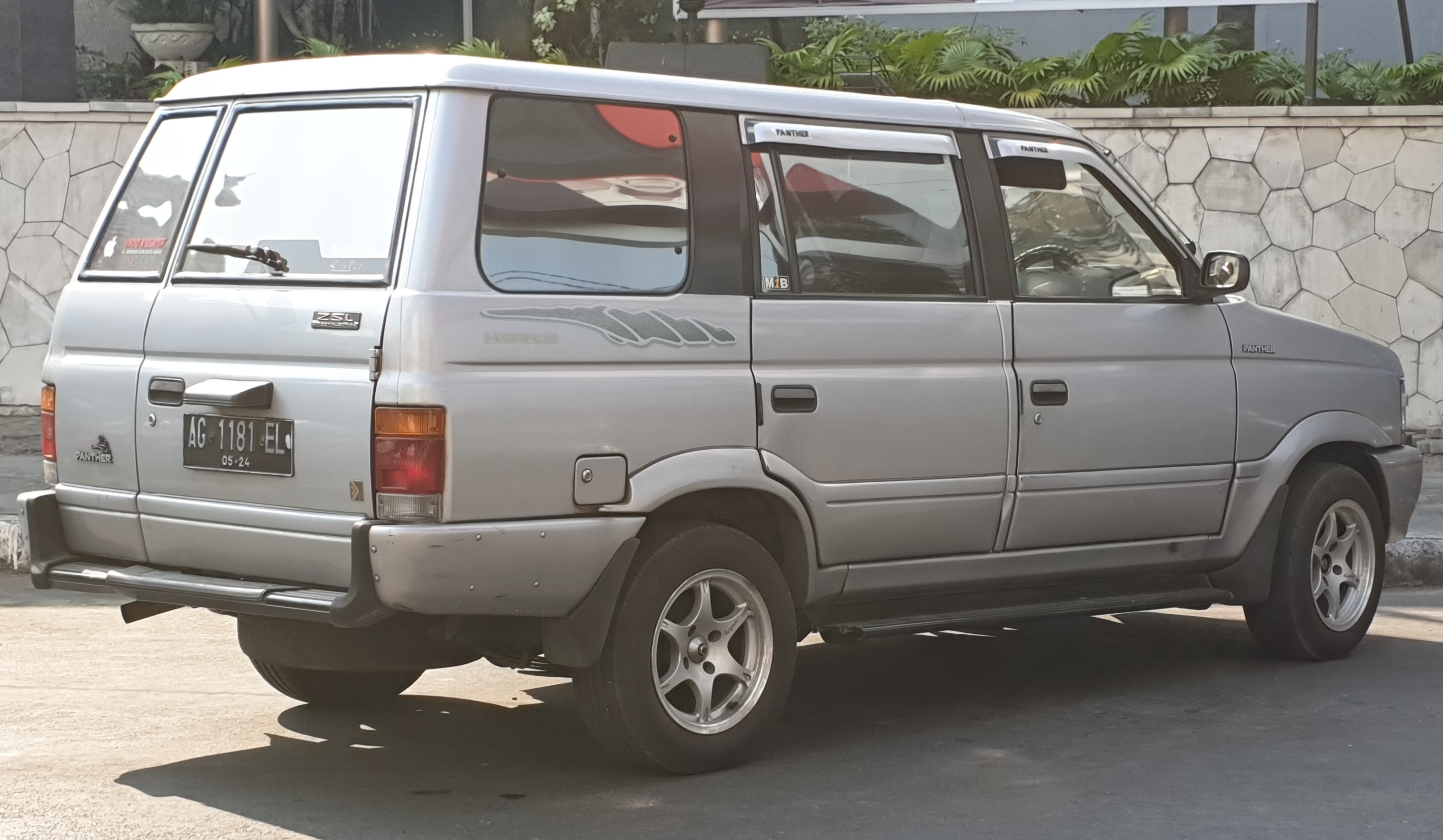
2000 Isuzu Panther Hi Grade 2.5 (TBR54; first facelift, Indonesia)

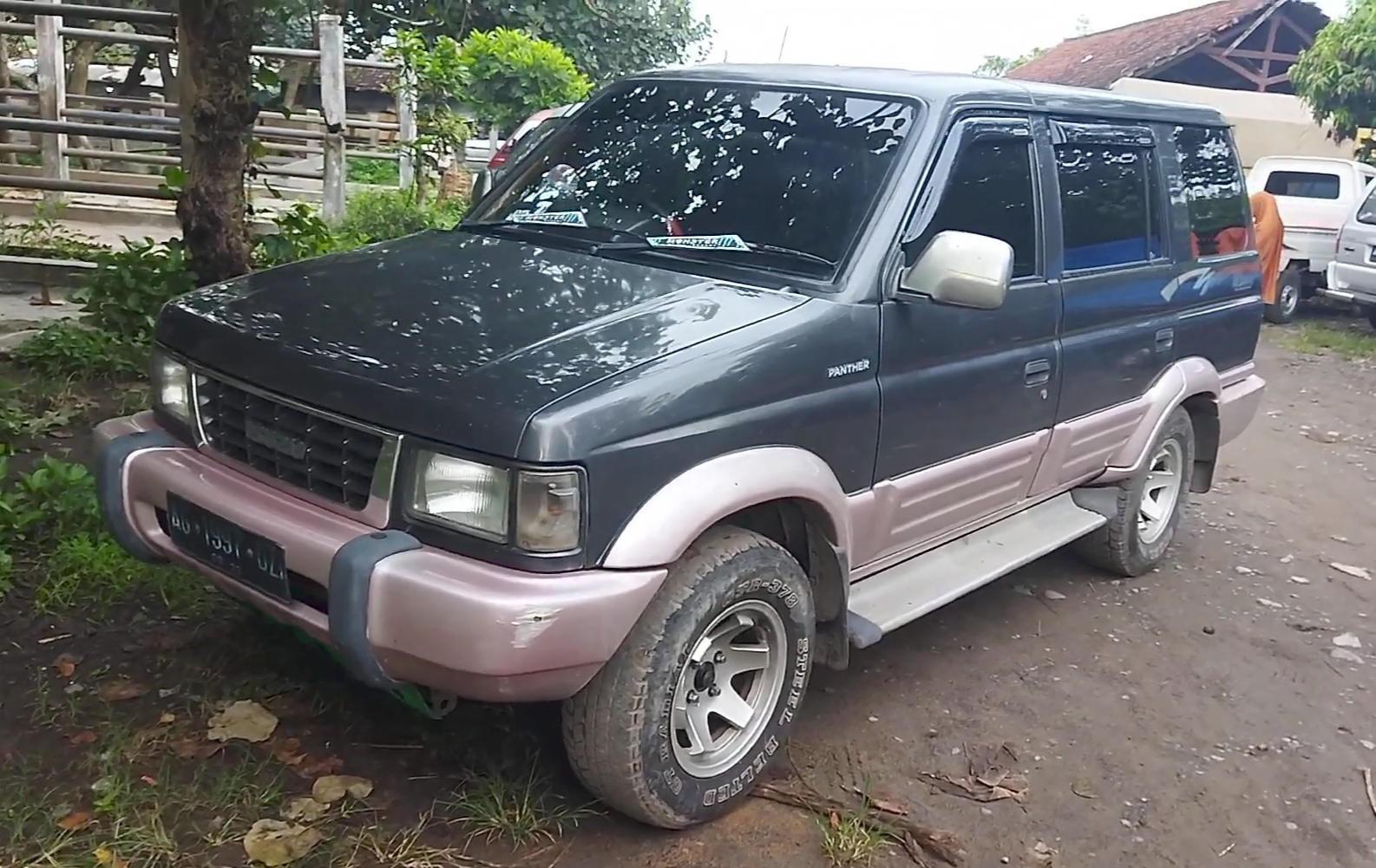
Isuzu Panther Hi Sporty 2.5 (TBR54, facelift, Indonesia)

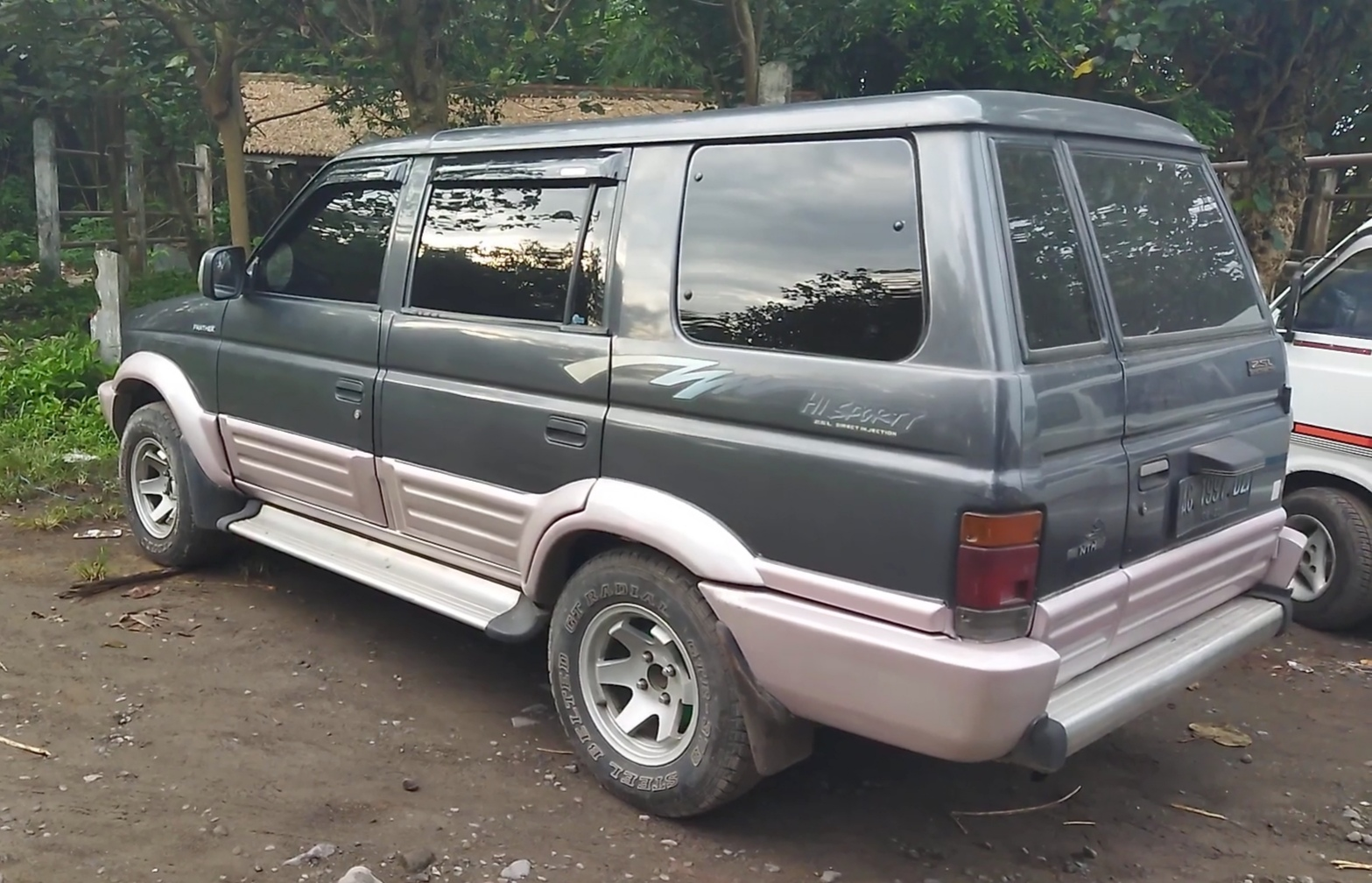
Isuzu Panther Hi Sporty 2.5 (TBR54, facelift, Indonesia)

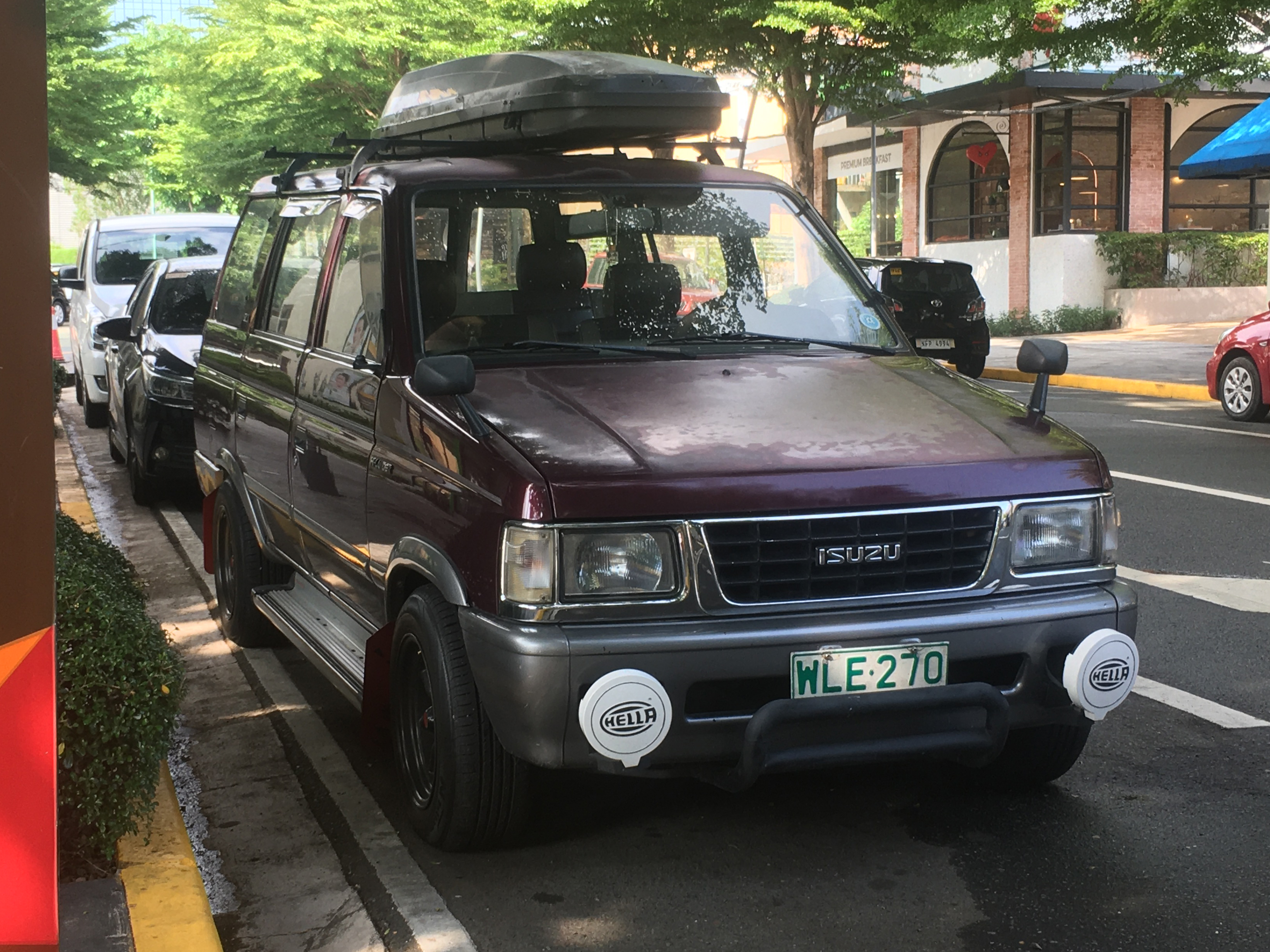
Isuzu Hi-Lander SLX 2.5 (TBR54, facelift, Philippines)

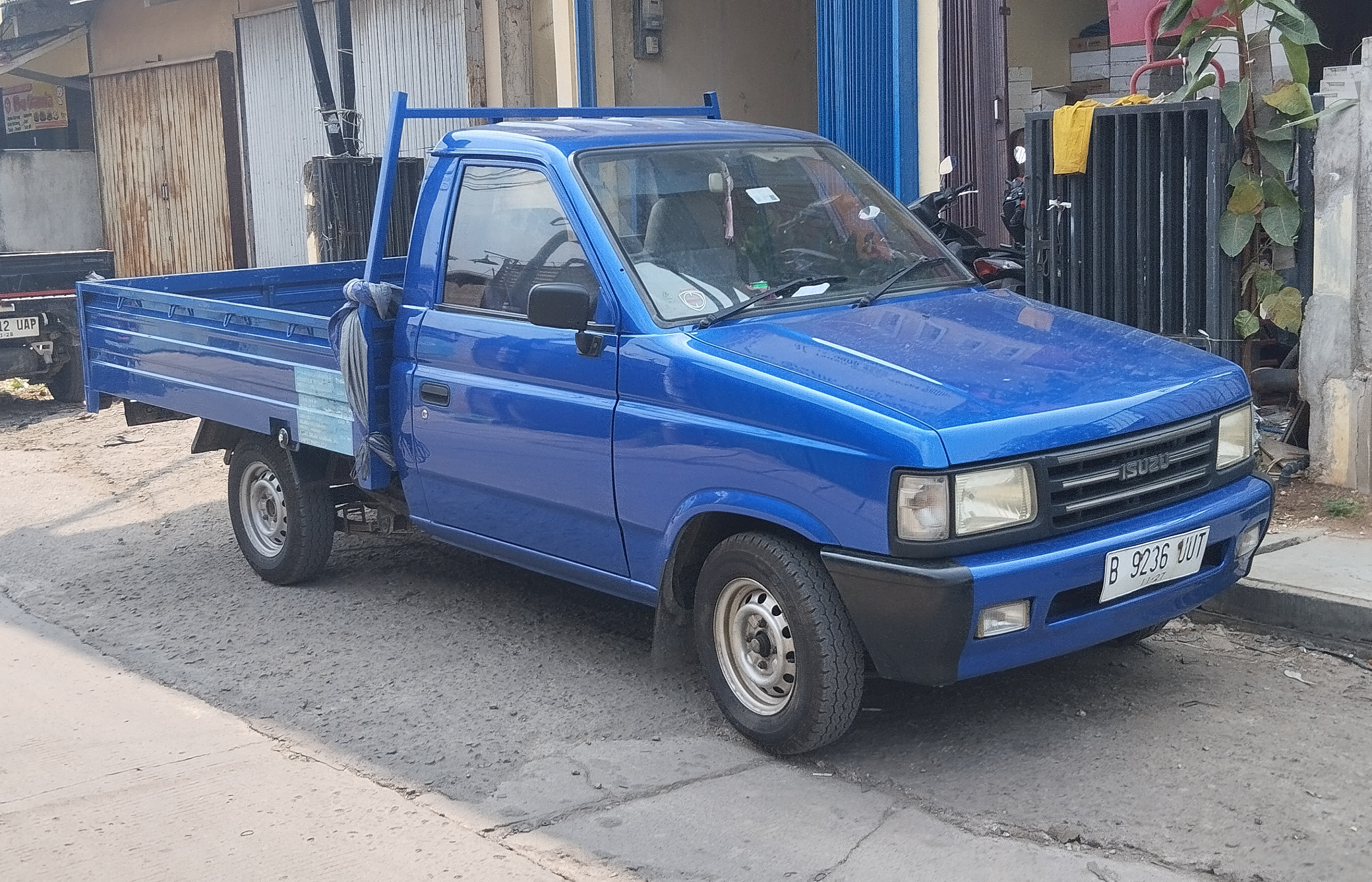
Isuzu Panther GD 3-Way 2.5 pickup truck (TBR54; second facelift, Indonesia)

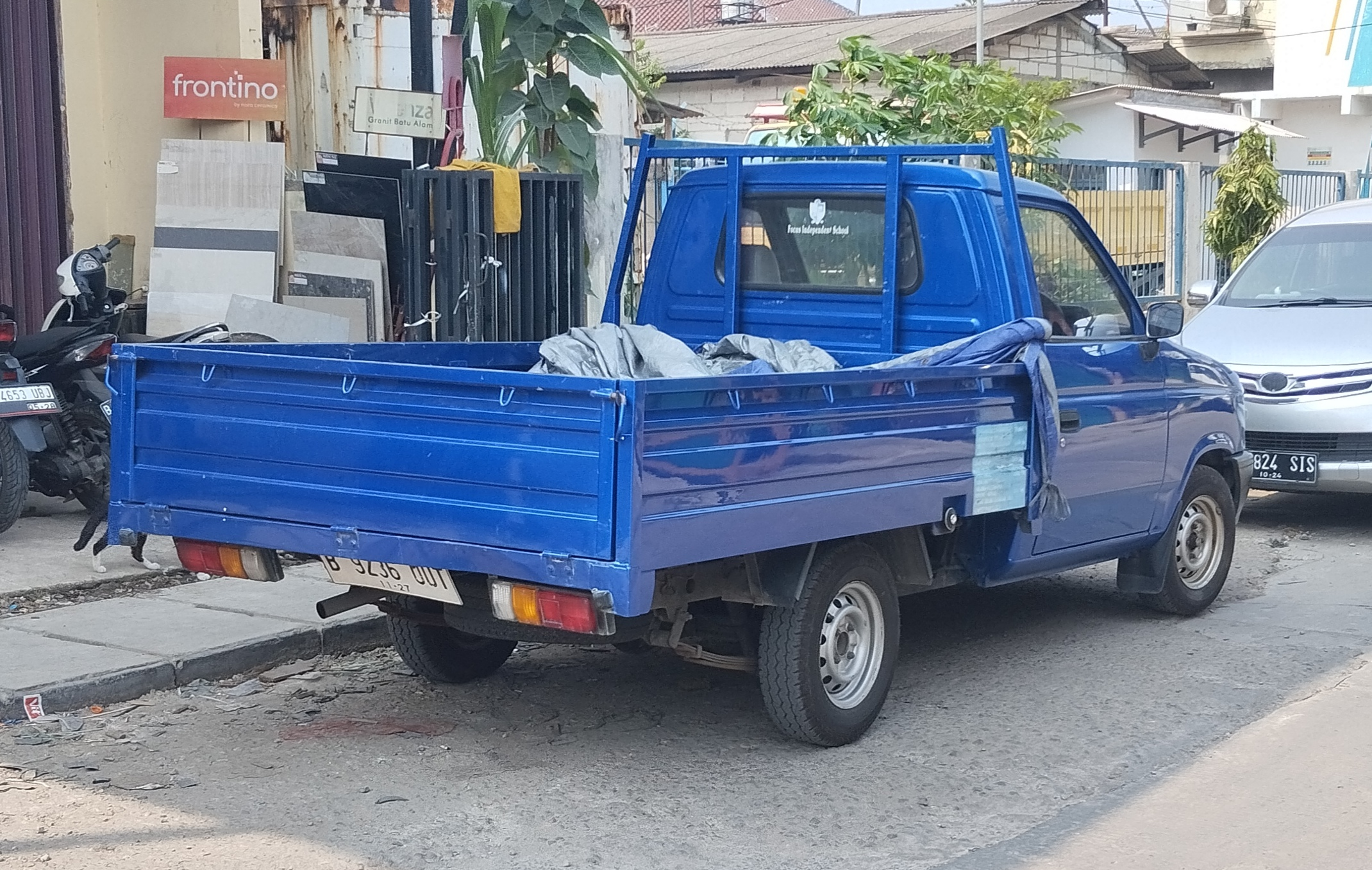
Isuzu Panther GD 3-Way 2.5 pickup truck (TBR54, Indonesia)

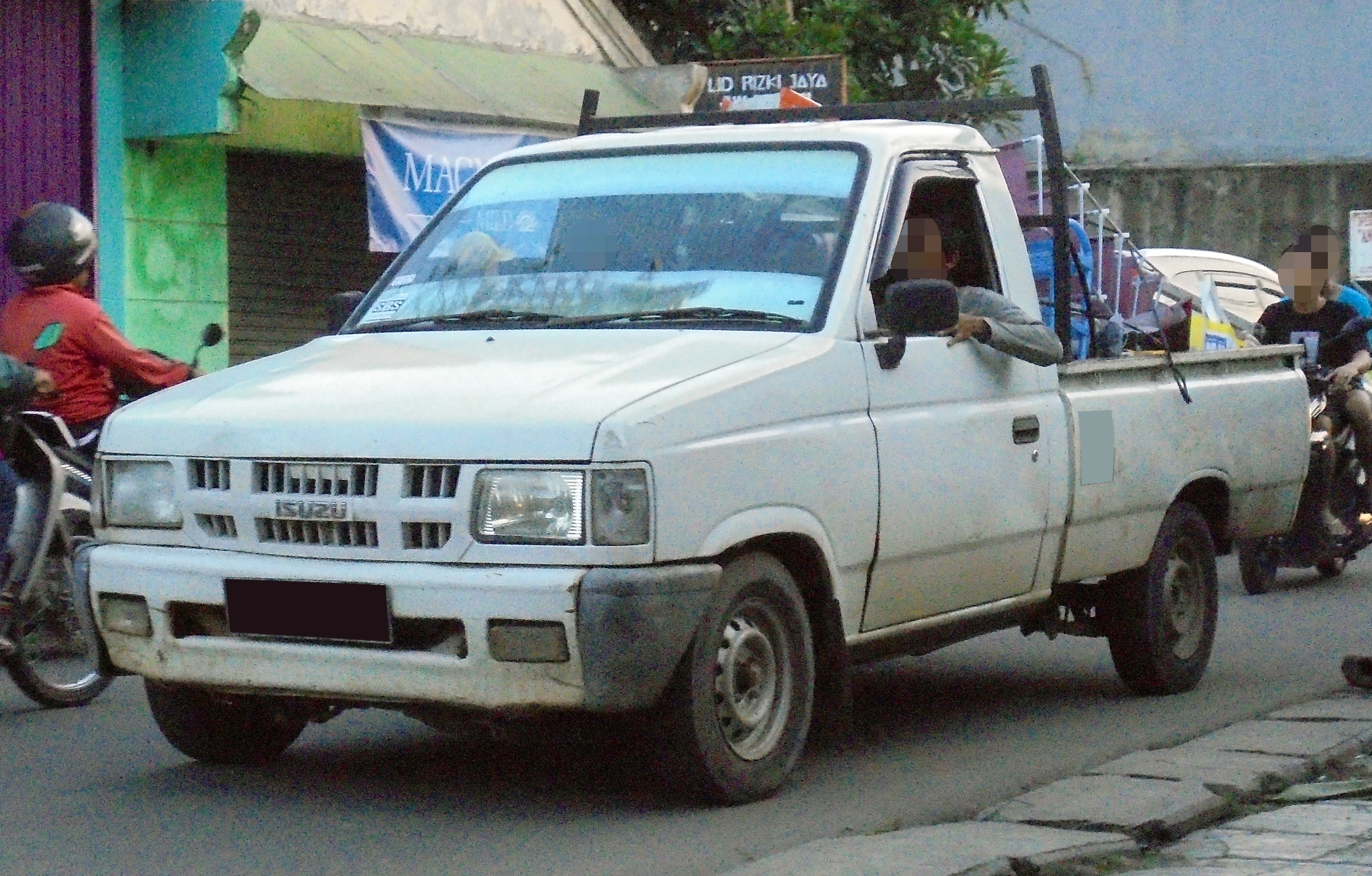
Isuzu Pickup 2.5 (TBR54; third facelift, Indonesia)

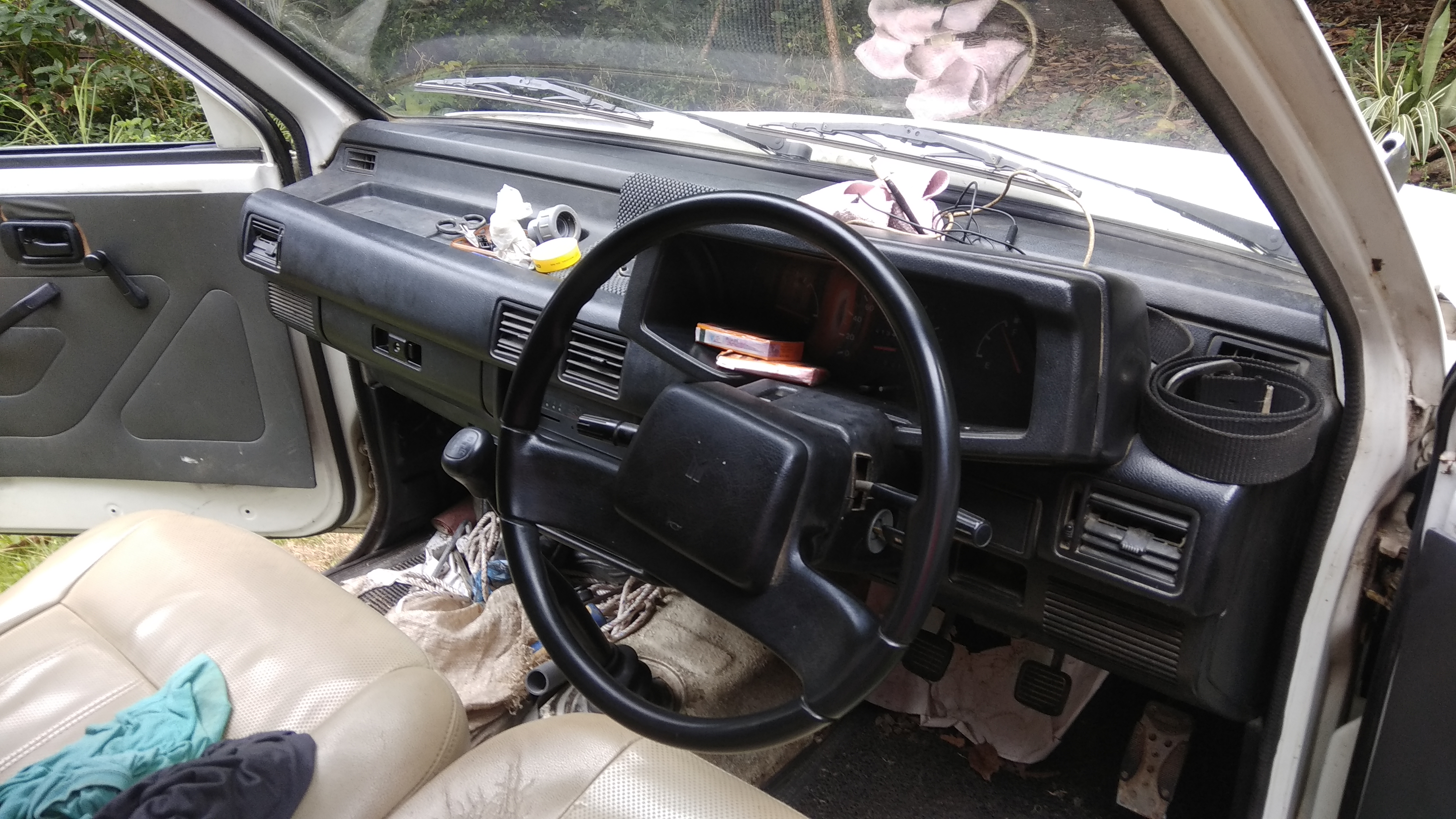
Interior

== Second generation (TBR541; 2000) ==
Second generation (TBR541)
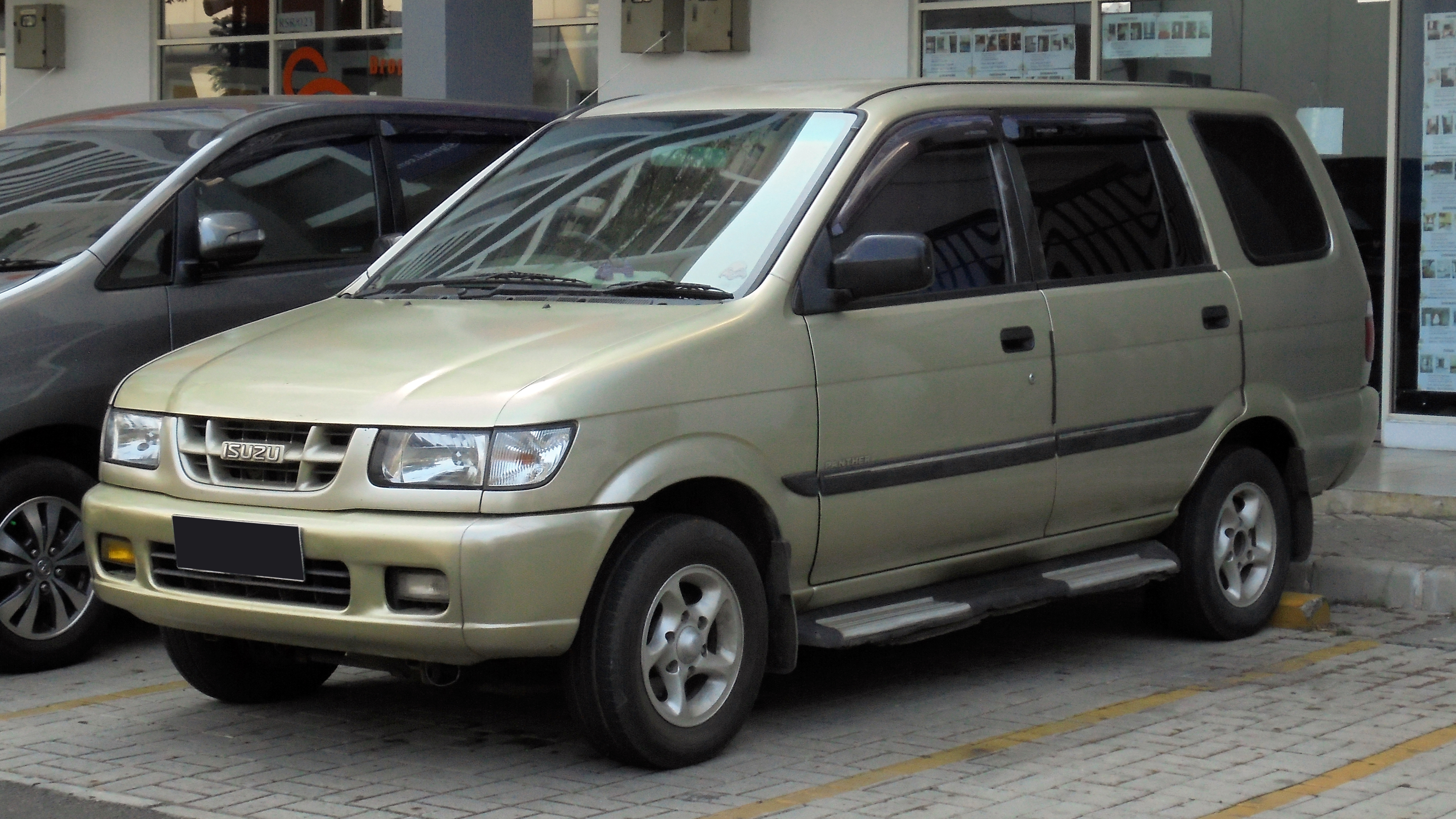
- 2001 Isuzu Panther Hi Grade LS 2.5 (TBR541; pre-facelift, Indonesia)

Overview
- Also called: Isuzu Crosswind; Isuzu Hi-Lander Crosswind; Chevrolet Tavera (2001–2017); Isuzu Hi-Lander
- Production: 2000–2020 (Indonesia); 2001–2017 (Philippines); 2004–2017 (India); 2003–2009 (Vietnam)
- Assembly: Indonesia: Sunter, Jakarta (Pantja Motor/IAMI); Philippines: Biñan, Laguna (IPC); India: Halol, Gujarat (GM India); Vietnam: Gò Vấp, Ho Chi Minh

Body and chassis
- Class: Compact station wagon
- Body style: 5-door wagon
- Related: Isuzu MU/Vega; Isuzu D-Max; Isuzu Faster

Powertrain
- Engine: Petrol: 2.2 L GM Family II I4 (Tavera, Indonesia); Diesel: 2.0 L Rover/Sonalika G-series 'G2' DI I4 turbo-diesel (2012-2015 Tavera Neo 3, India); 2.5 L 4JA1 DI I4; 2.5 L 4JA1-L DI low-pressure turbo-diesel I4; 2.5 L 4JA1-CR Common Rail I4 (2016-2017 Tavera, India)
- Transmission: 5-speed manual MSG5K; 5-speed manual TR-2450; 4-speed automatic AW03-72LE

Dimensions
- Wheelbase: 2,680 mm (105.5 in)
- Length: 4,435–4,749 mm (174.6–187.0 in)
- Width: 1,680–1,771 mm (66.1–69.7 in)
- Height: 1,765–1,873 mm (69.5–73.7 in)
- Curb weight: 1,620–1,655 kg (3,571–3,649 lb)

The second generation Panther was introduced on September 6, 2000, at the tenth Gaikindo Auto Expo with the completely rounded, aerodynamic shape of the 21st century. The vehicle is loosely based on the Isuzu MU, and shared the same dashboard design as the Isuzu Faster/TFR/KB and the Isuzu VehiCROSS, both from the same era. It is only available in station wagon version with the same 2.5 L Direct Injection 4JA1 diesel engine as the first generation, and featured the crystal multi-reflector headlights for the first time.

It is available in short wheelbase, which is available in the base SM, the mid-level SV and Hi Grade SS trim levels, and long wheelbase, which is available in the base LM, the mid-level LV and Hi Grade LS trim levels. The long wheelbase variant is 200 mm (7.9 in) longer than the short wheelbase variant. For the first time, the automatic transmission variant is also offered for the LS Hi Grade trim with the 4JA1-L turbocharged diesel engine.

In 2001, the top-of-the-line Touring variant was introduced as a sport utility vehicle variant of the second generation Panther with the same turbocharged diesel engine as the automatic transmission variant of the LS Hi Grade trim, two-tone exterior color with silver colored body kit and front bumper guard, higher ground clearance, spare tire attached on rear door and four-spoke steering wheel from the third generation Isuzu Gemini (later also used on the LS trim in 2003). The redesigned tail lights with crystal multi-reflector were introduced with the Touring variant and later also used on the LV and LS Hi Grade trims. In 2003, the second generation Panther has no longer used rubber seals and used compound sealant instead on both rear side and rear window, and also introduced the top-of-the-line Grand Touring variant which has a single exterior color instead of two-tone and without front bumper guard, and is positioned just above the Touring variant. Since then, the short wheelbase variant was discontinued. The Adventure variant which is based on the LV trim with body kit is also available. The manual transmission variant of the LS Hi Grade trim with a turbocharger is also available as well.

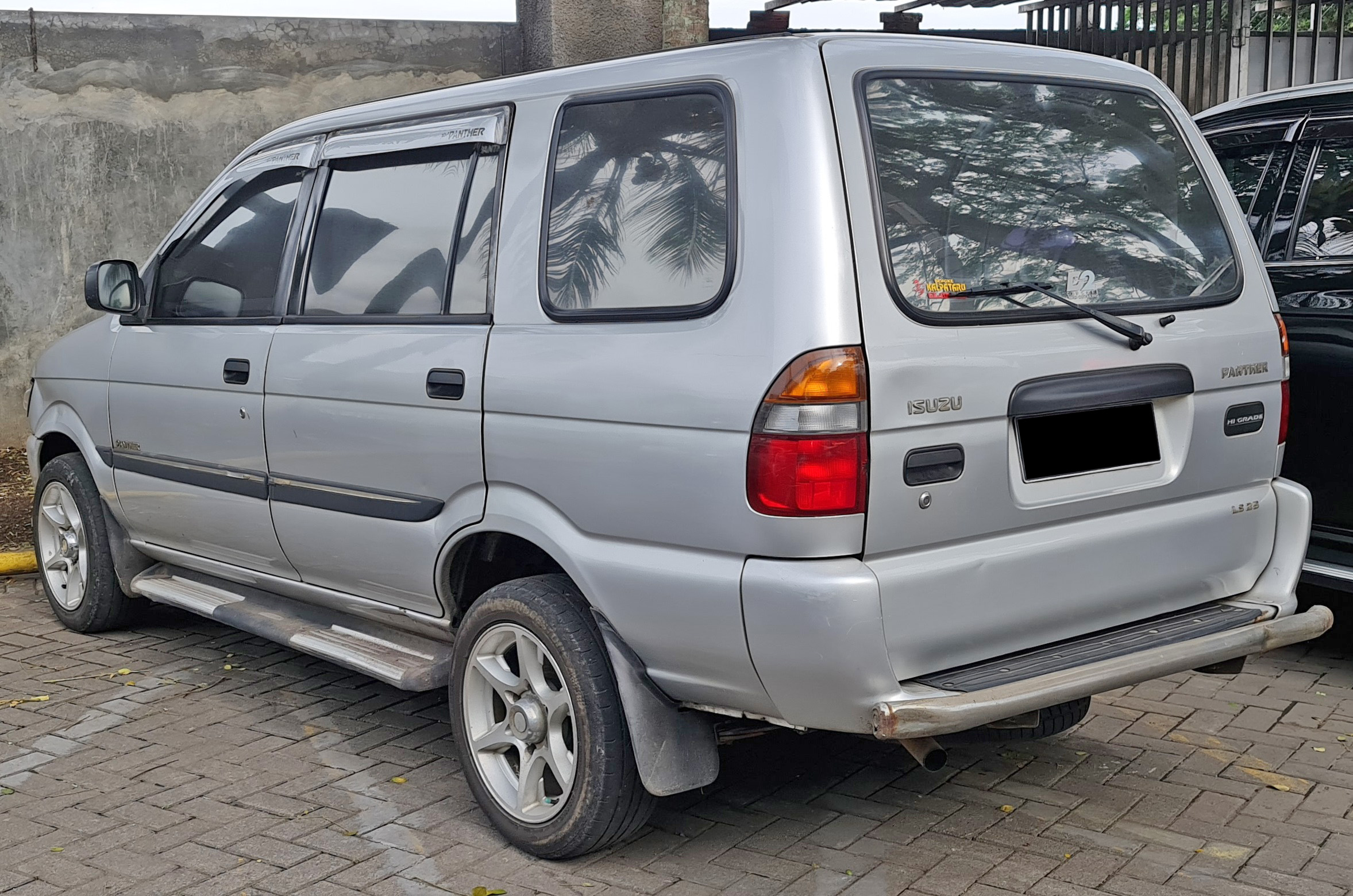
2001 Isuzu Panther Hi Grade LS 2.5 (TBR541; pre-facelift, Indonesia)

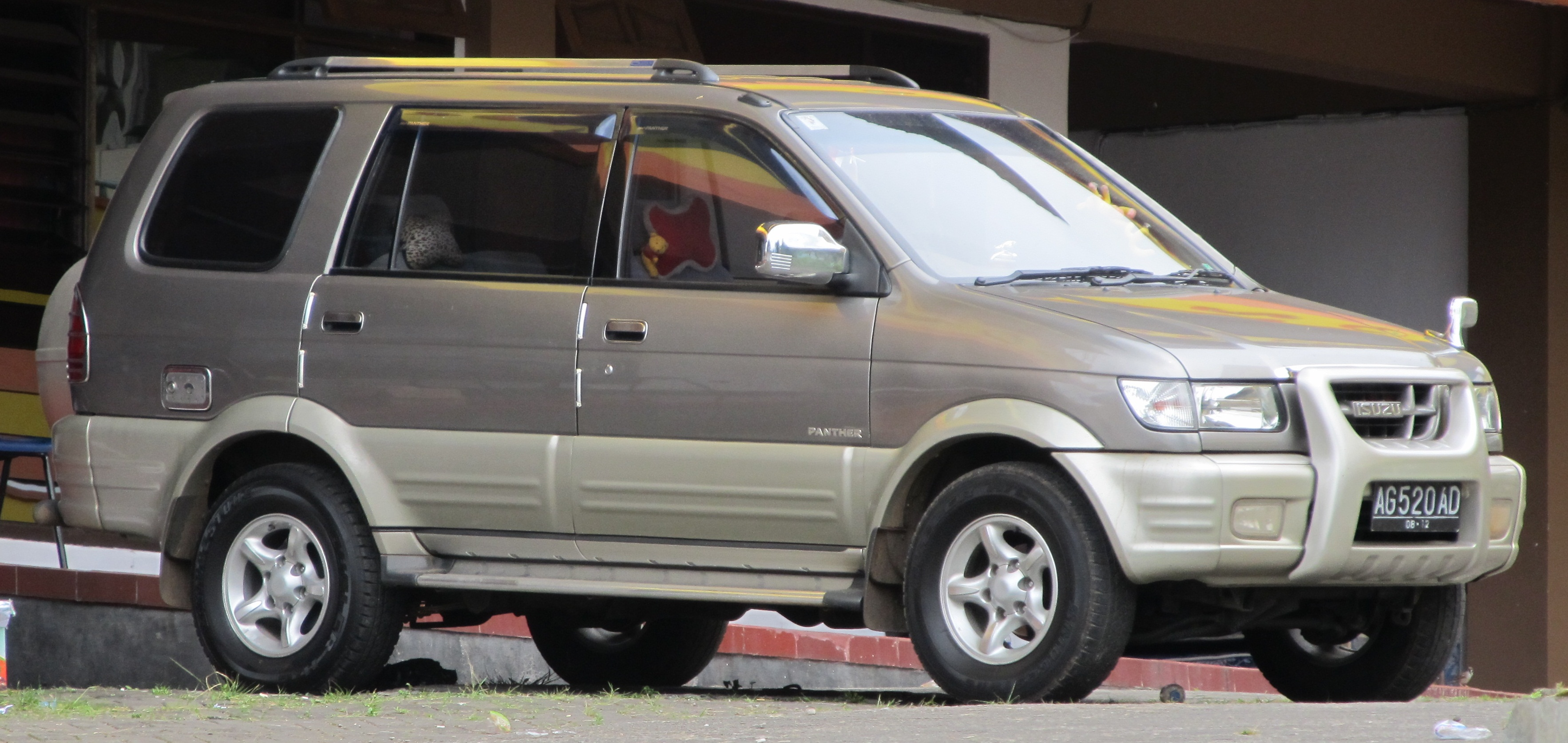
2002 Isuzu Panther Touring (TBR541; pre-facelift, Indonesia)

=== Facelift ===
The second generation Panther received its facelift in August 2004 with new headlights, redesigned front grille and bumper, redesigned wheels and black plastic rear door garnish with Panther emblem, and also introduced the Smart trim, which is based on the LM trim. It is available in LM, Smart, LV and LS Hi Grade trim levels, as well as Adventure, Touring and Grand Touring variants in long wheelbase only. The LS Hi Grade trim, Touring and Grand Touring variants received a redesigned four-spoke steering wheel (later also used on the LV trim and Adventure variant in 2008). The front bumper guard on the Touring variant was removed. In early 2007, all variants have been given a turbocharger to meet Euro 2 emission standards and the LM trim was discontinued.

In late 2007, the interior color was changed from black to beige (for all variants) and the door trim was redesigned (initially for the LS Hi Grade trim, Touring and Grand Touring variants, later also for the LV trim and Adventure variant in 2008). Its exterior was refreshed twice, in 2009 and 2013. In early 2009, the front grille was refreshed and in late 2011, the tail lights were refreshed.

In 2013, the rear door garnish was redesigned exclusive to the LS Hi Grade trim, Touring and Grand Touring variants. The Touring and Grand Touring variants are no longer have the spare tire mounted on the rear door. The Adventure variant was later discontinued due to low demand.

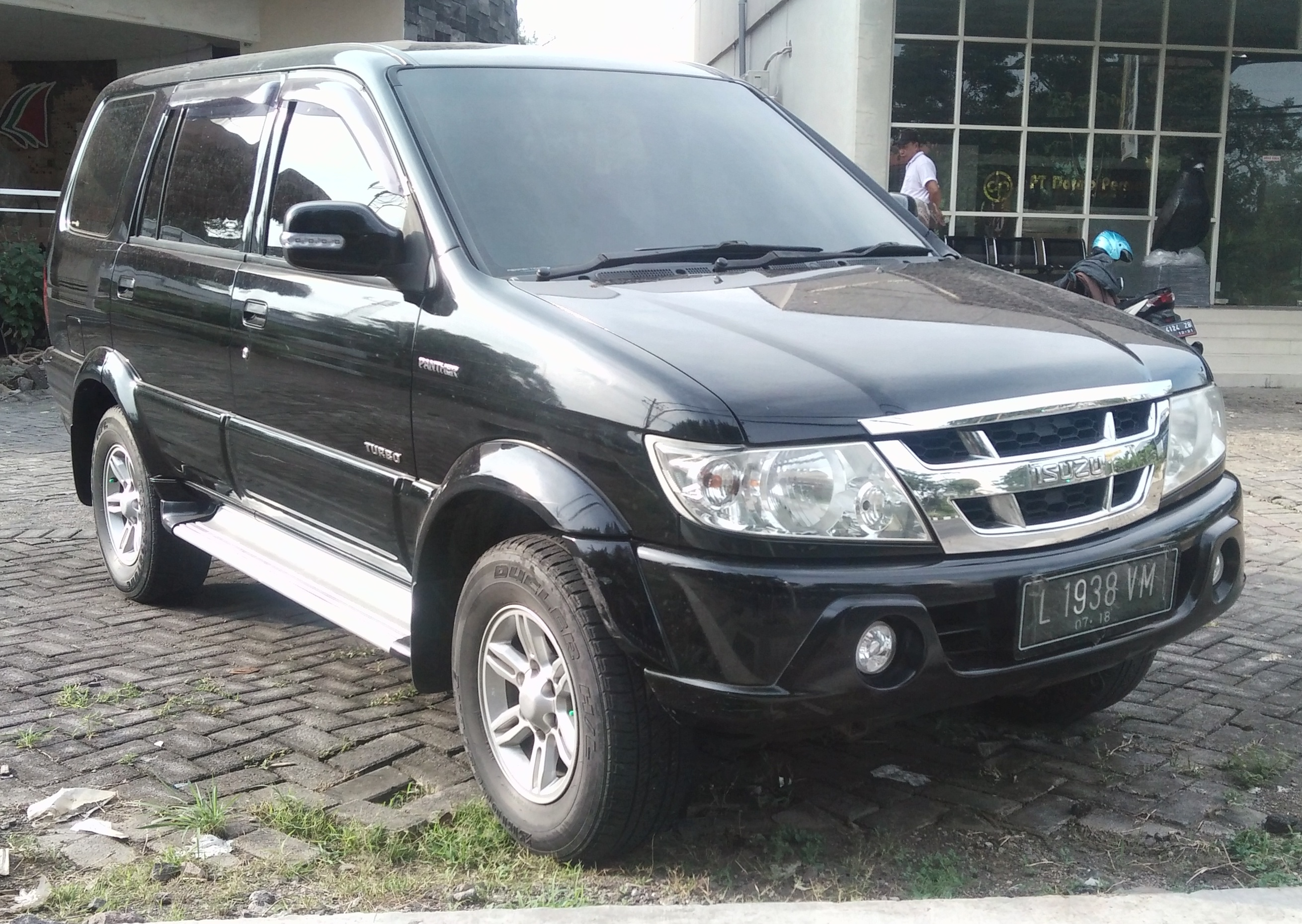
2008 Isuzu Panther Grand Touring (TBR541; first facelift, Indonesia)

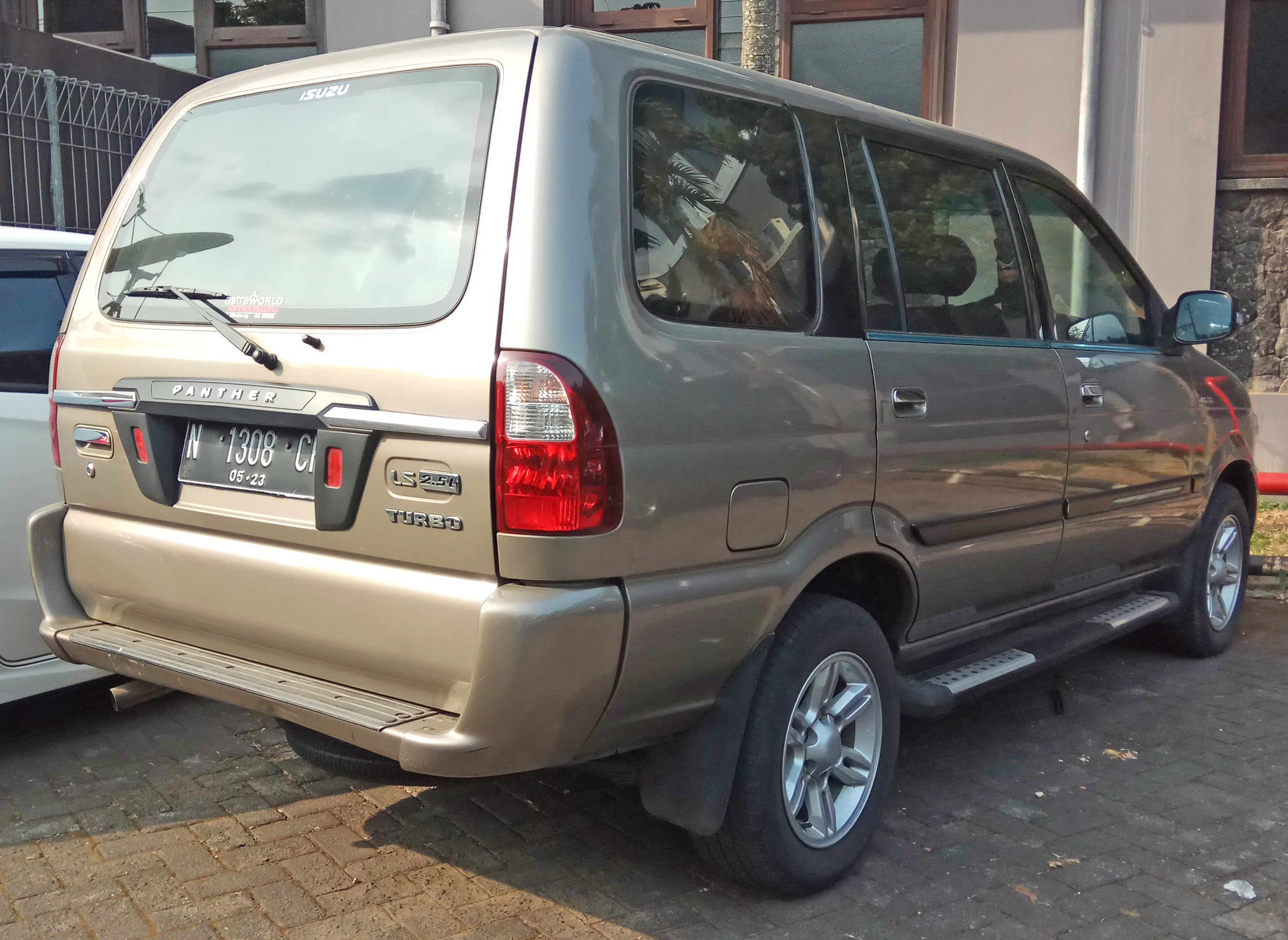
2008 Isuzu Panther LS 2.5 Turbo (TBR541; first facelift, Indonesia)

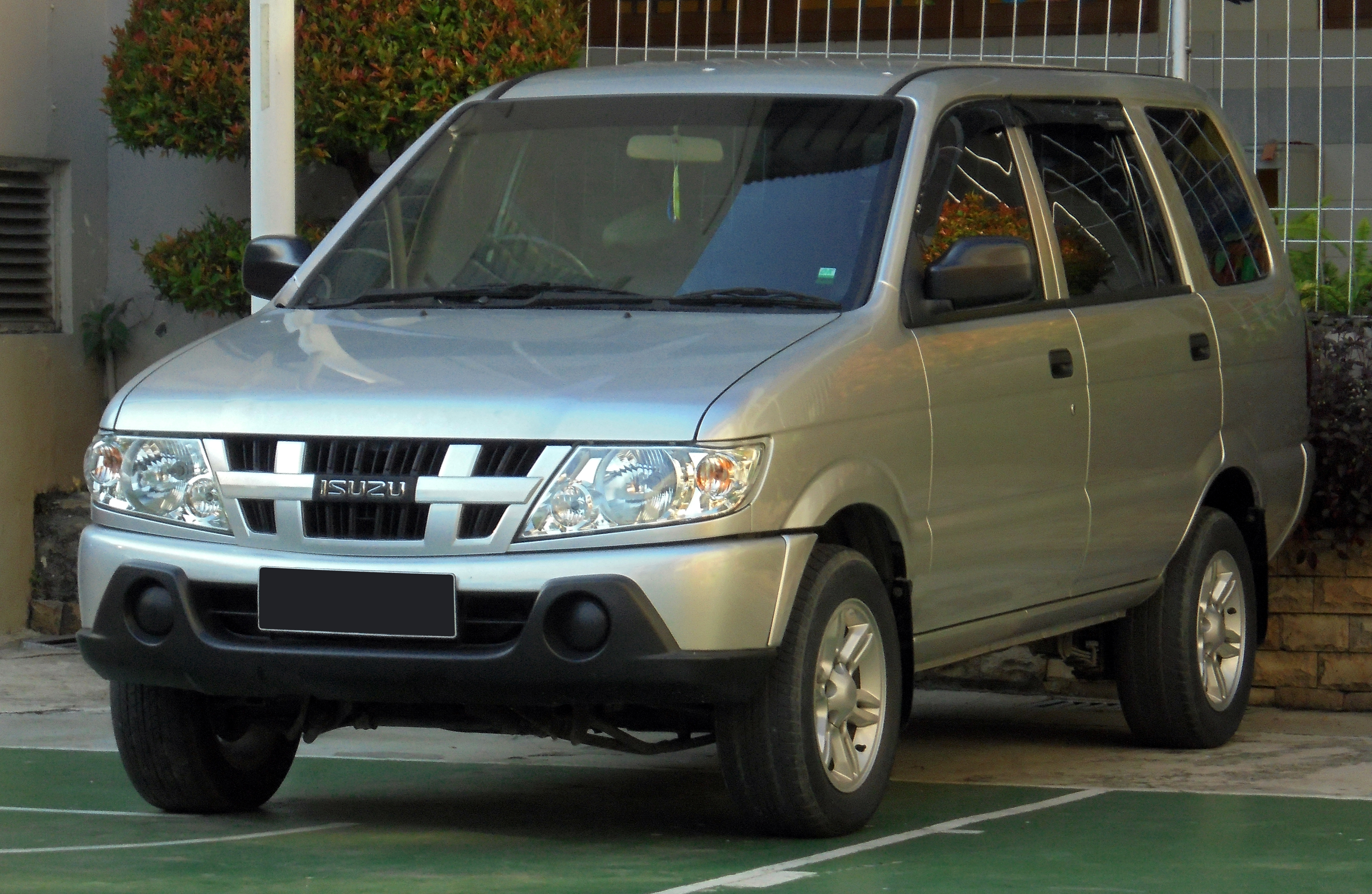
2017 Isuzu Panther LM Smart 2.5 Turbo (TBR541; second facelift, Indonesia)

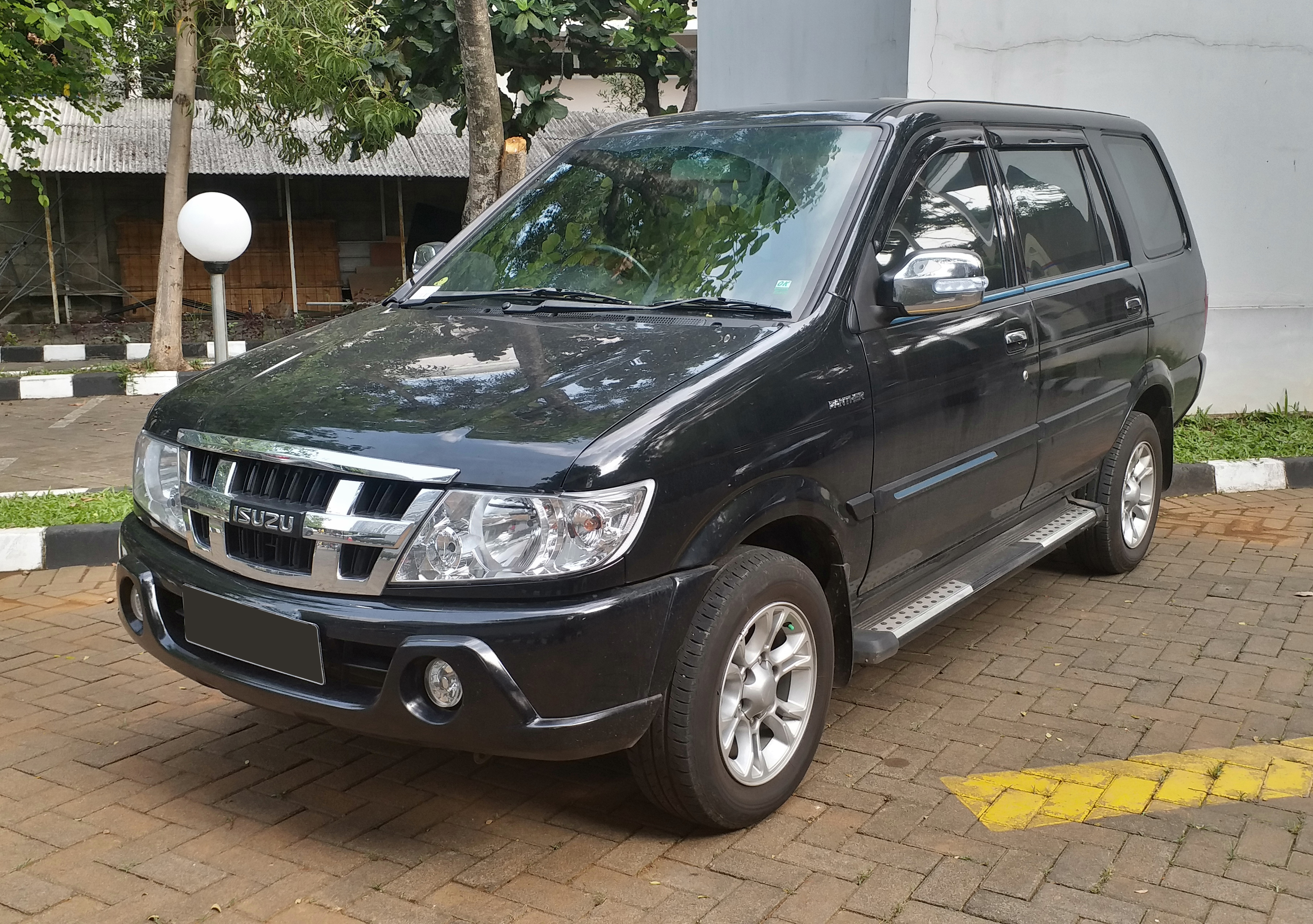
2018 Isuzu Panther LS 2.5 Turbo (TBR541; second facelift, Indonesia)

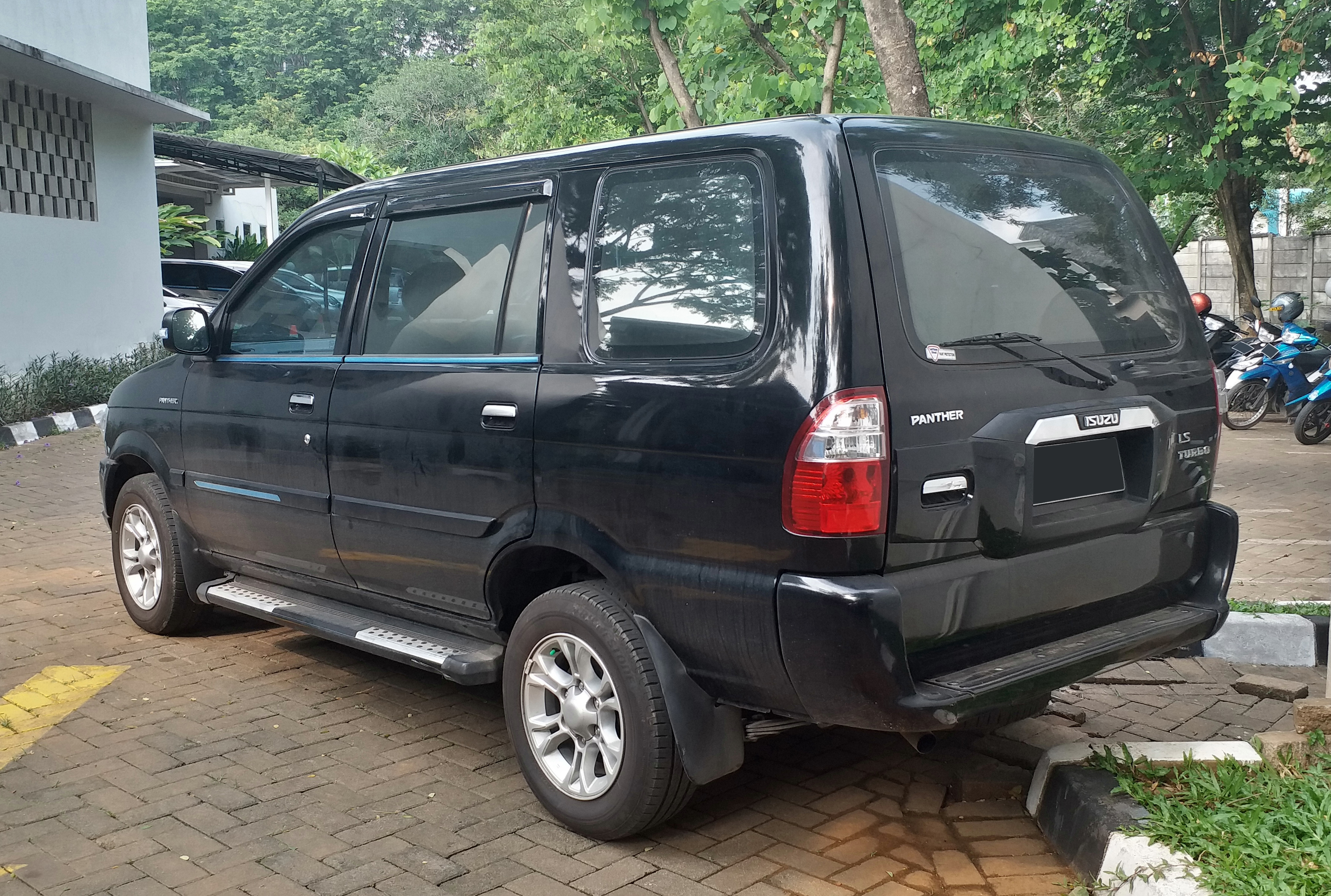
2018 Isuzu Panther LS 2.5 Turbo (TBR541; second facelift, Indonesia)

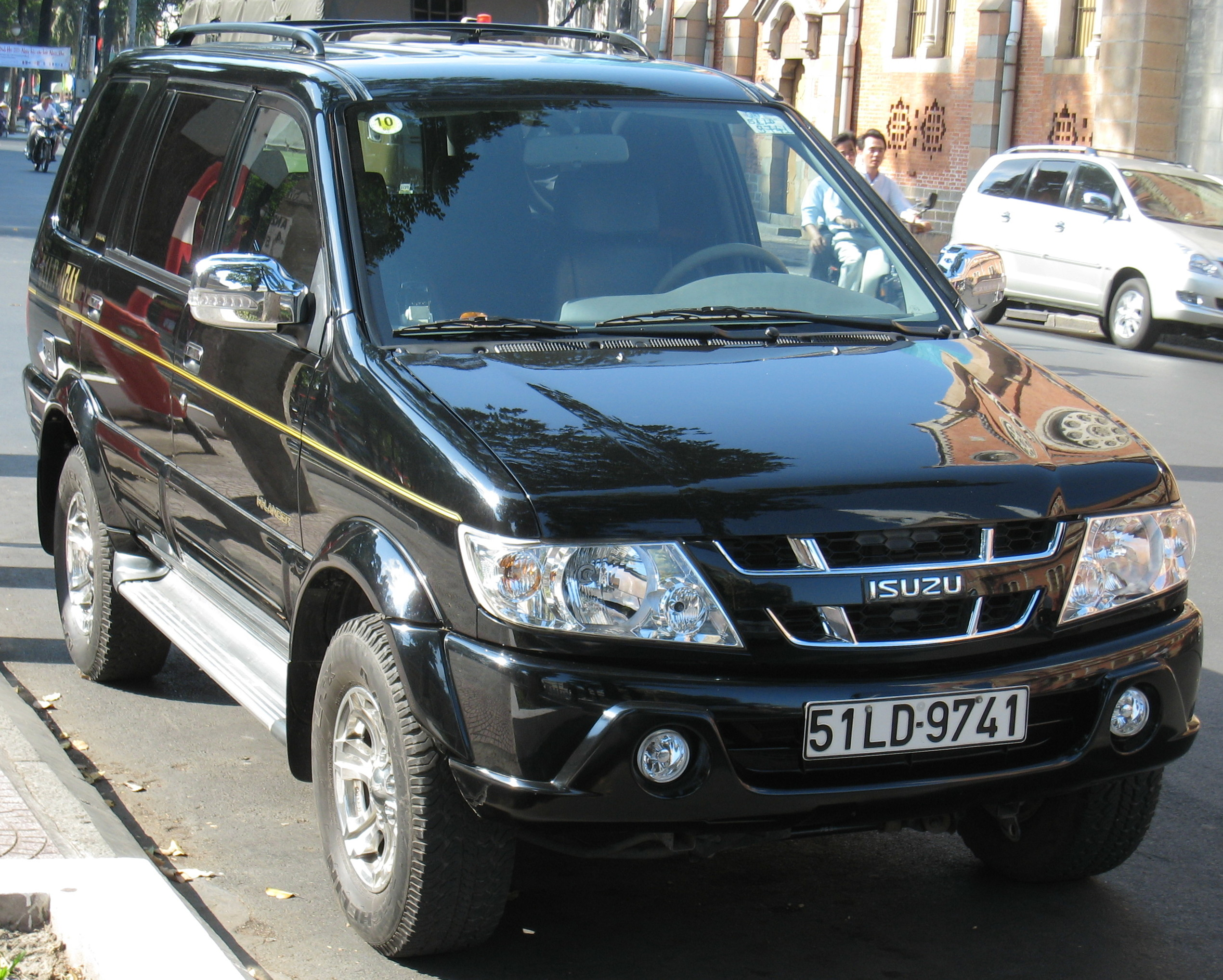
Isuzu Hi-Lander (TBR541; first facelift, Vietnam)

=== Crosswind (Philippines) ===
In the Philippines, the Crosswind replaced the Hi-Lander in 2001, and was given a major redesign in early 2005 from the "Hi-Lander Crosswind" to just "Crosswind" as well as "Sportivo". Minor facelifts were given in 2007 and 2009 to the same format. Then it got facelifted again in 2010 featuring a halogen projector type headlamp, redesigned front grille with chrome ornament for the higher variants, amber side mirror led indicators, redesigned spare wheel cover (XUV and Sportivo), and an integrated rear bumper diffuser for the XUV and Sportivo variants.

In 2015, it got facelifted again for the fourth time. It went back from projector type headlamps to simpler multi-reflector redesigned headlamps and also the front bumper and grille are redesigned. In 2017, the XUV and Sportivo X gets a different instrument cluster similar to the modern Isuzu Panther.

In 2017, IPC introduced the Black Series limited edition models available for the XT, XUV and Sportivo X variants which features black front grille, smoked headlamps, black alloy wheels (with red pinstripe for the Sportivo X), black side mirrors (silver for the Sportivo X), black rear spoiler, black spare wheel cover (XUV and Sportivo X), and comes with a roof basket as standard.

It was discontinued in 2017 after it sold off its final units due to the Philippines' enforcement of rules for Euro IV emission standards by 2017.

The Crosswind for the Philippine market was available in:

- Black Series (Final Edition)
- X-MAX (Limited Edition)
- Sportivo X (2012–2017)
- Sportivo (2005–2012)
- XUVi (2002–2006)
- XUV (2002–2012, 2015–2017)
- XTRM (2002–2004)
- XTi (2006–2012)
- XTO (2001–2002)
- XT (2001–2017)
- XL (2001–2017)
- XS (2012–2017)
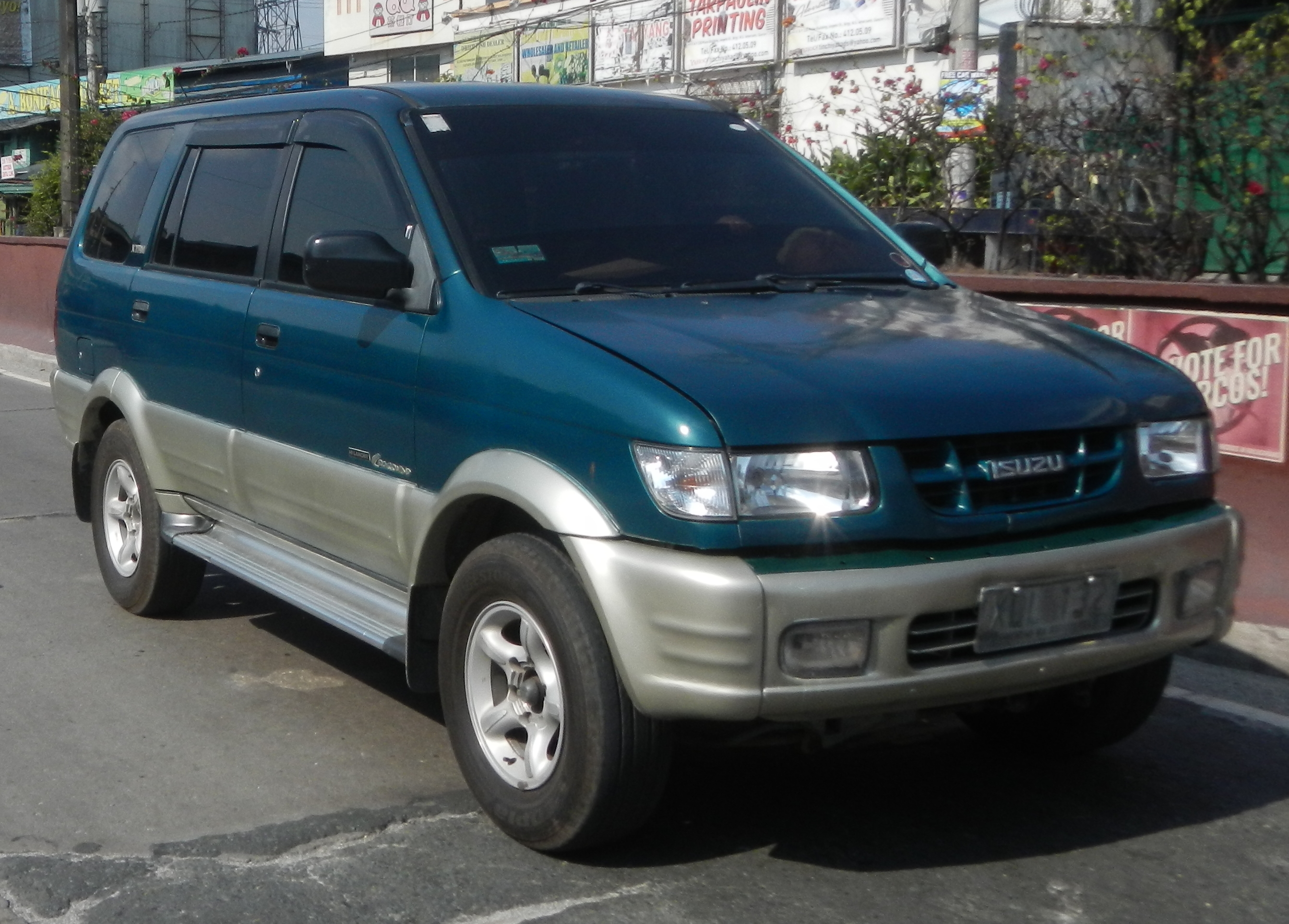
Isuzu Hi-Lander Crosswind 2.5 XTRM (TBR541; pre-facelift, Philippines)

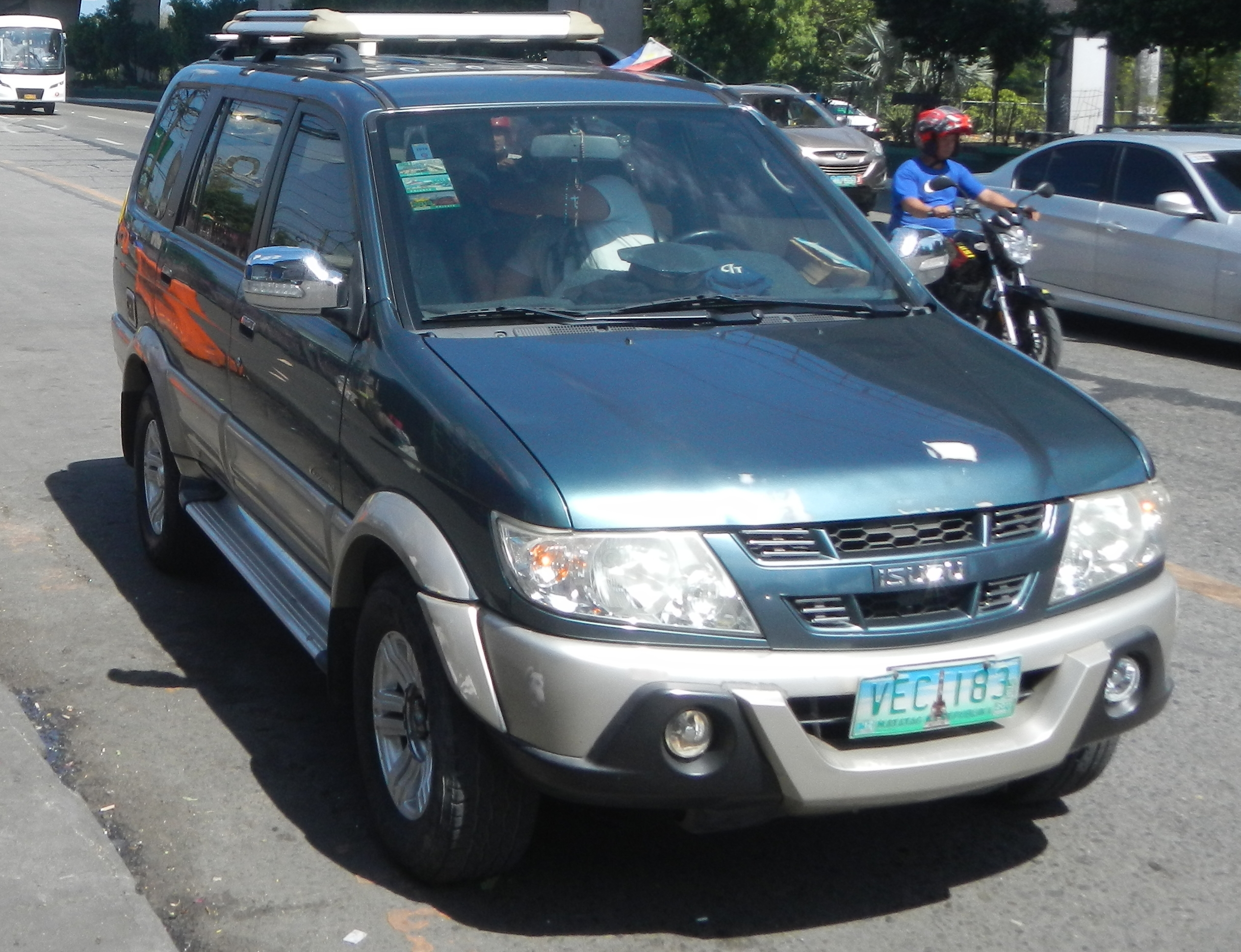
Isuzu Crosswind 2.5 (TBR541; first facelift, Philippines)

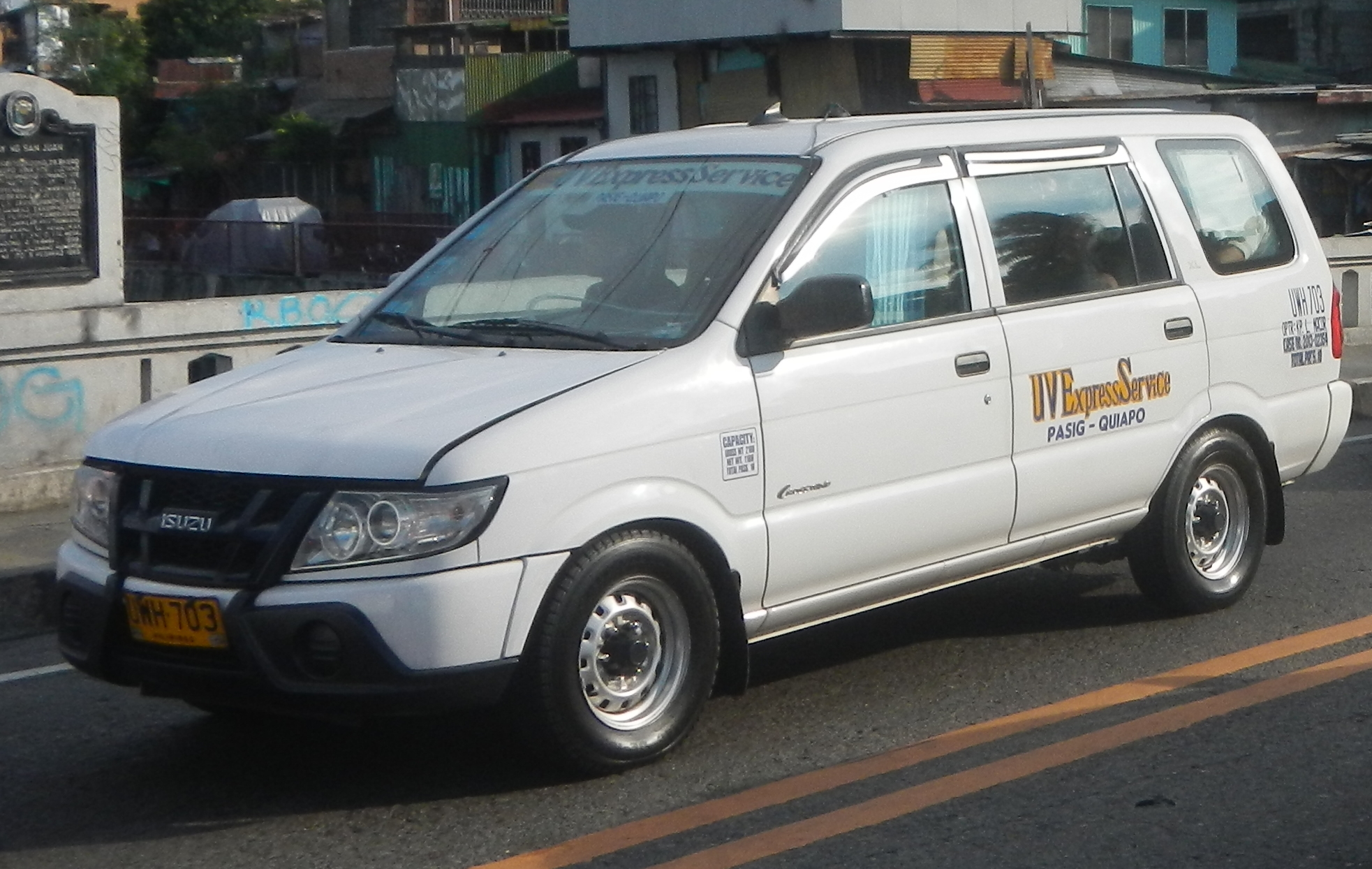
Isuzu Crosswind 2.5 XL (TBR541; second facelift, Philippines)

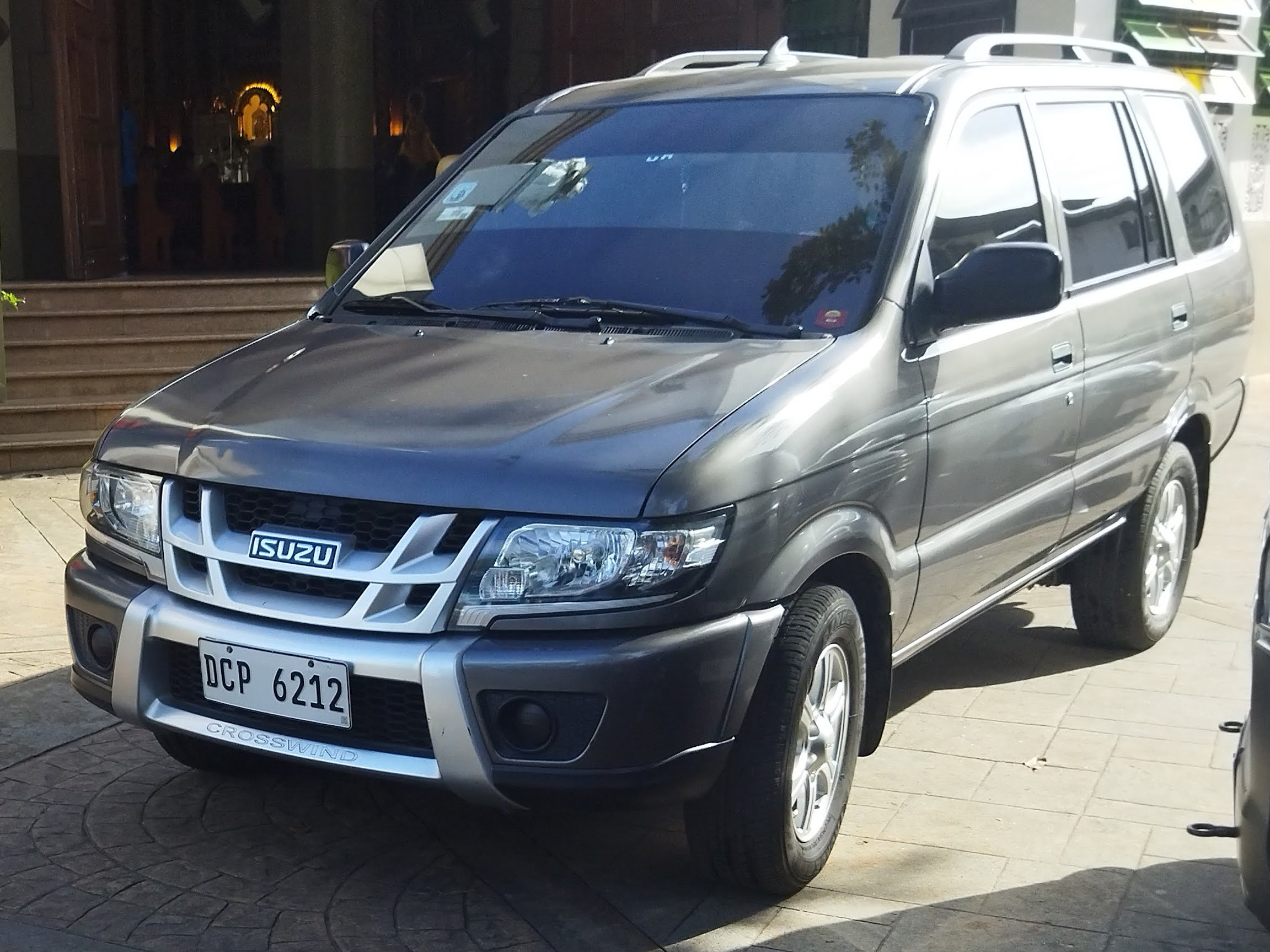
2016 Isuzu Crosswind 2.5 XT (TBR541; third facelift, Philippines)

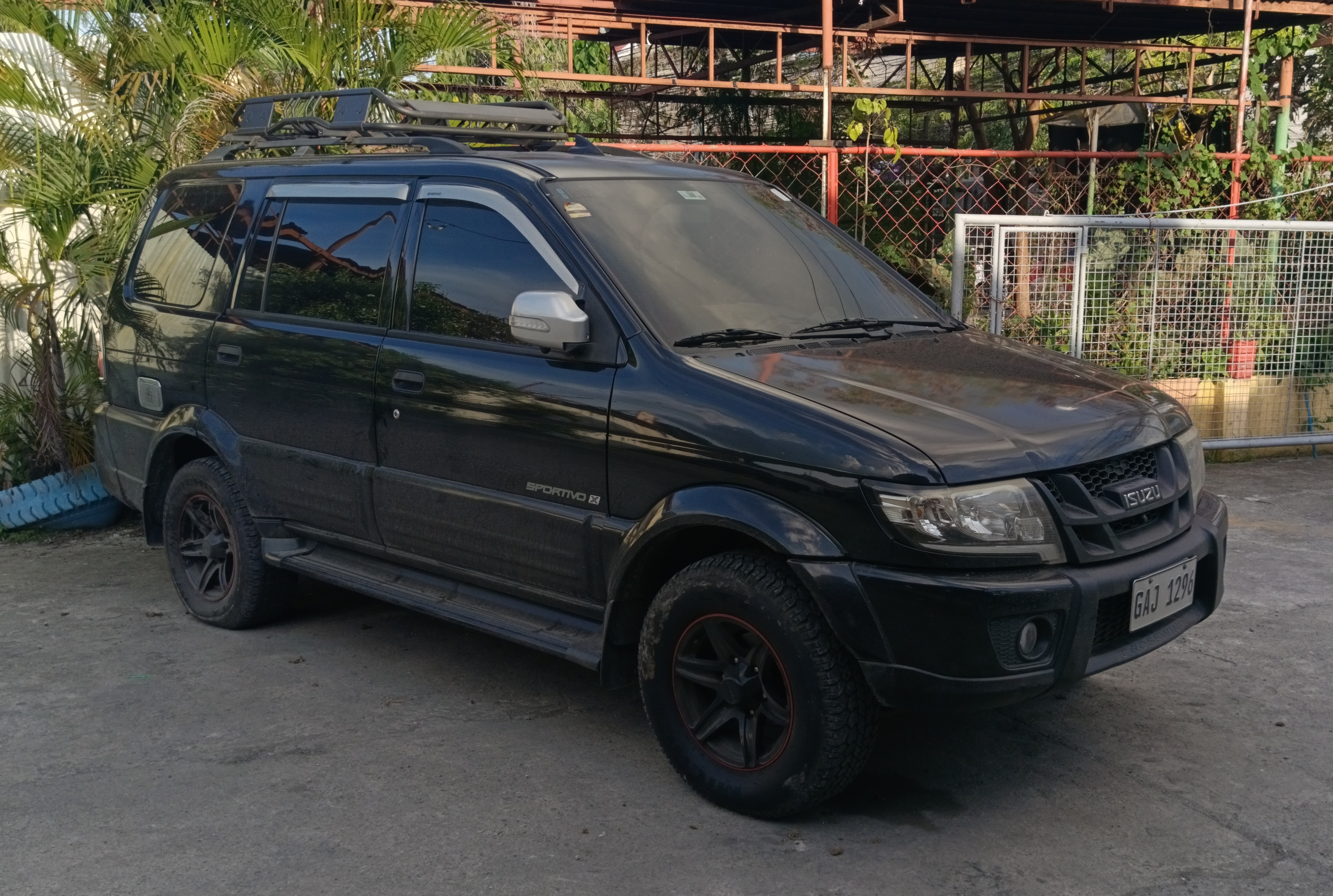
2017 Isuzu Sportivo X Black Series (TBR541; third facelift, Philippines)

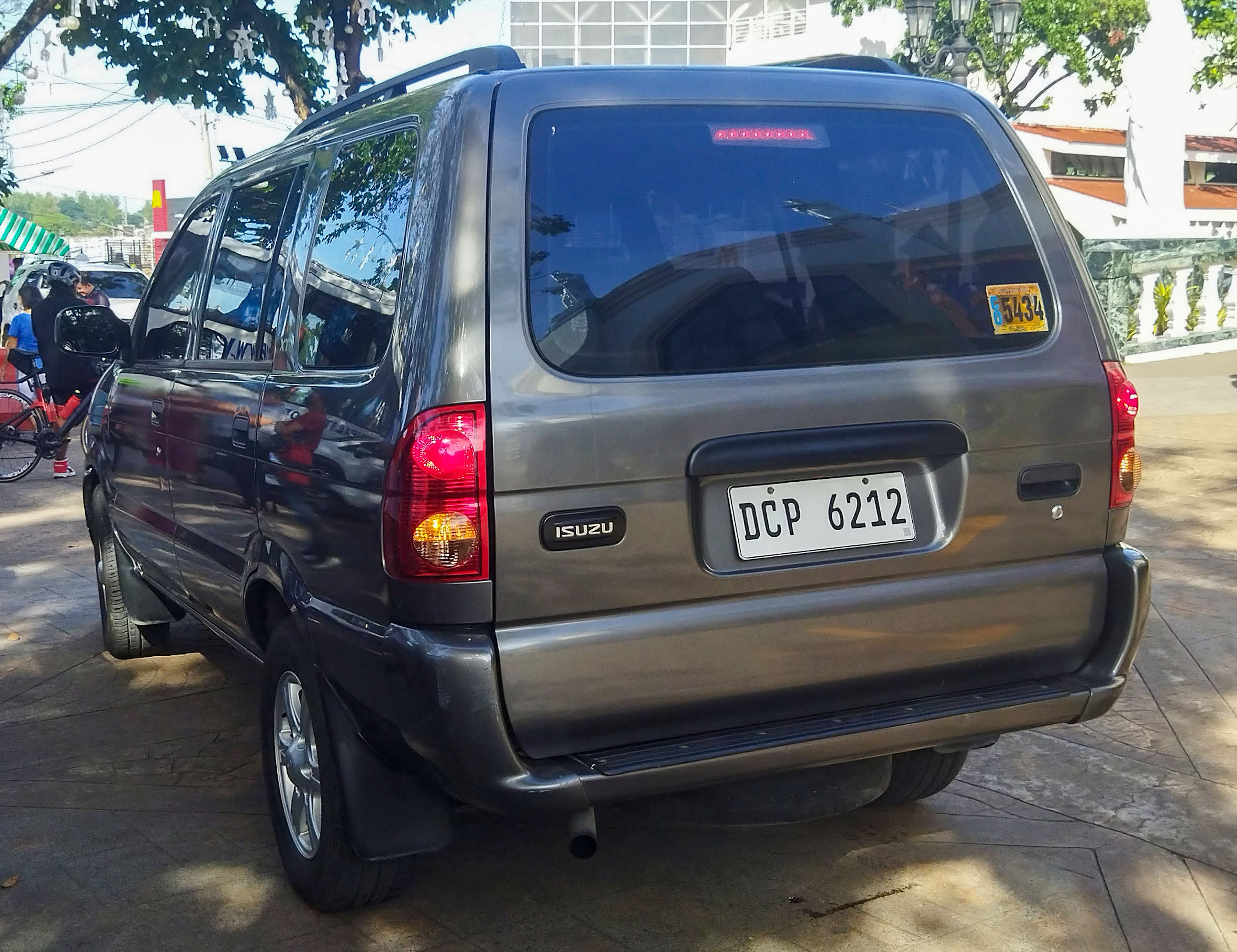
Isuzu Crosswind rear view

=== Chevrolet Tavera ===
The Panther was sold as the Chevrolet Tavera in Indonesia between 2001 and 2005, and in India by American automaker General Motors under the Chevrolet marque between 2004 and 2017 when General Motors ceased sales in the Indian market.

The name of the vehicle comes from the name of the small French village, Tavera, Corsica, known for its steep paths and whose CEO of Isuzu, Susumu Hosoi is used to test his vehicles.

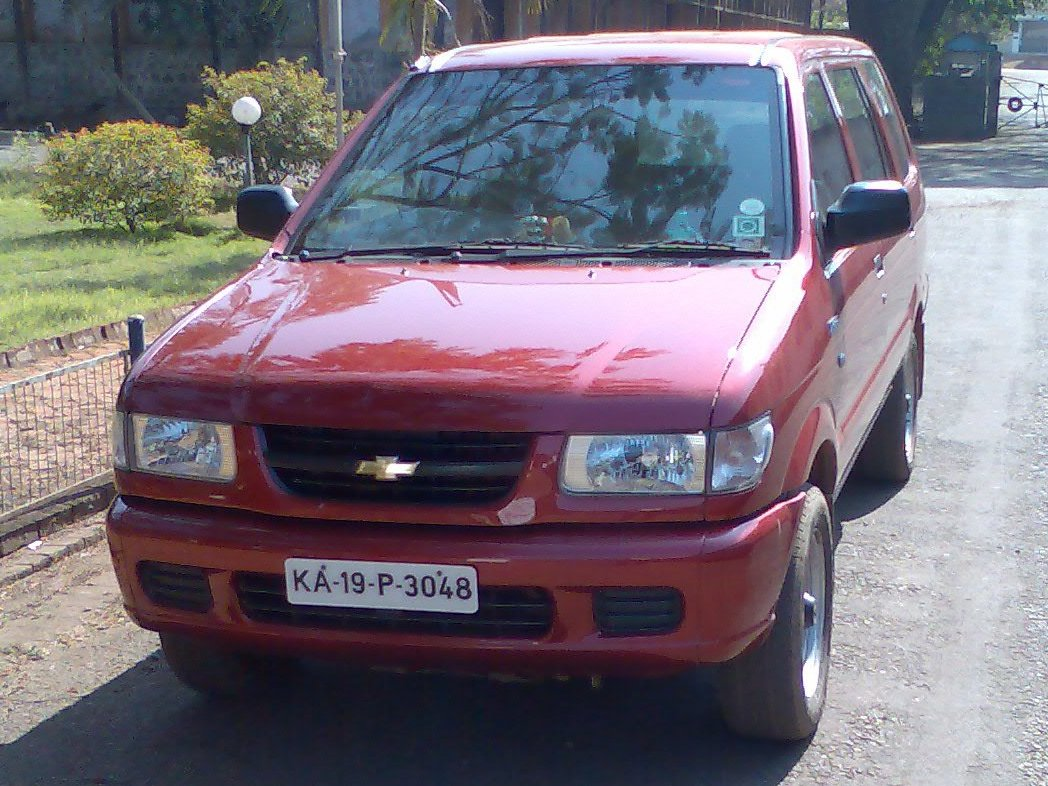
2004 Chevrolet Tavera 2.5 (TBR541; pre-facelift, India)

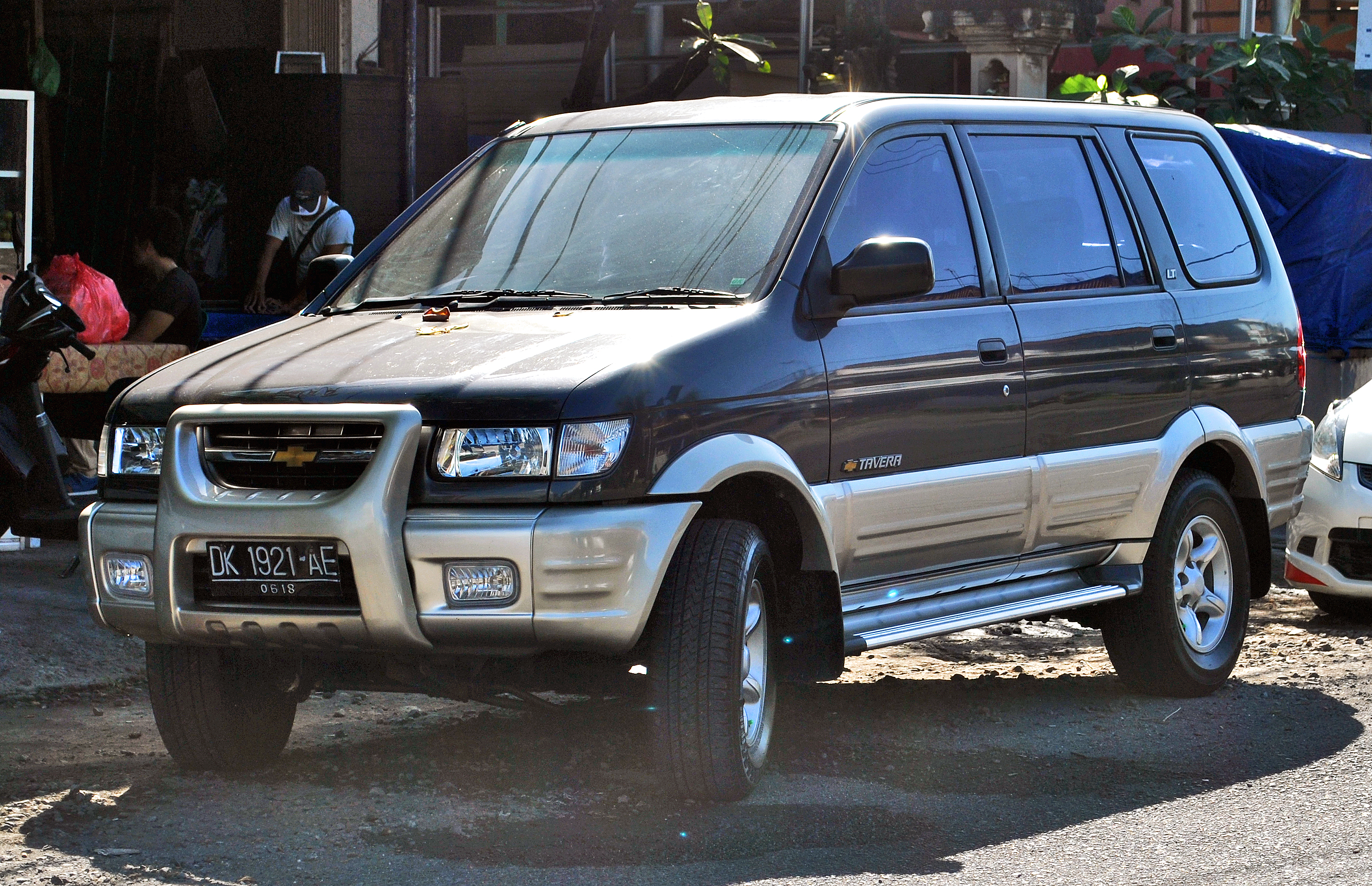
2003 Chevrolet Tavera 2.2 LT (TBR541; Indonesia)

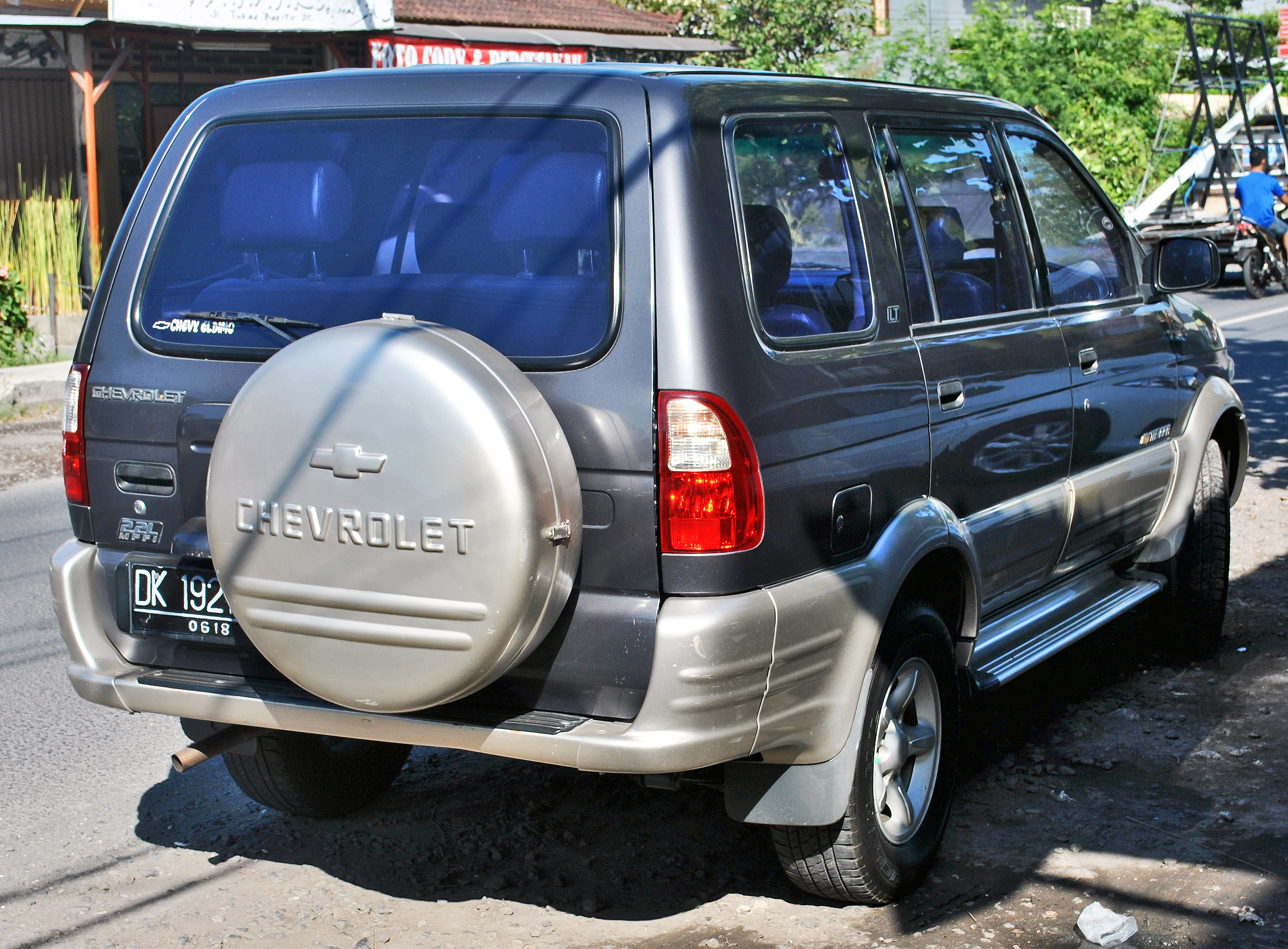
2003 Chevrolet Tavera 2.2 LT (TBR541; Indonesia)

==== India ====
The Tavera went on sale in India in 2004. Its main competition includes the Toyota Innova, Mahindra Bolero, Tata Sumo, and similar vehicles. The Indian Tavera was built with knock-down kit sourced from Isuzu Indonesia. General Motors sold 208,431 units of the Tavera in the Indian market.

In India, there were 2 versions of the Tavera, the original Tavera, the base model which includes the B1 and B2 trims, and the Tavera Neo 2 (this version was called simply Tavera Neo before the Indian Tavera facelift, and before that Tavera Elite), the normal version which includes the LS-B3, the LS-B4, the LT-L and the high-end SS-D1. In 2006, under a new marketing of their Indian lineup as "an Indian revolution" (similar to their US marketing campaign), the Tavera is now sold as two models. The original Tavera is still being sold; however more upmarket models in India are now sold as the "Tavera Neo 2". In September of the same year, the Indian Tavera got a facelift. The facelift included the front grille and revised interiors.

Later again in 2012, it received a facelift which includes revised front lights and bumpers and introduced as Tavera Neo 3. It featured a new engine option, a cleaner 2.0 L G-series diesel engine sourced from Sonalika to comply with Bharat Stage 4 emissions standard imposed in several metro cities in India. The new engine was marketed as TCDi engine and delivers more power, 107 PS (79 kW) and is equipped with a variable-geometry turbocharger. The Sonalika engine option was discontinued in 2015 with the Tavera being withdrawn temporarily from sale in Bharat Stage 4 cities until the outgoing 2.5L turbo diesel was revised to meet BS4 emissions standard with a reduced compression ratio and common rail fuel injection in 2016 and was sold until 2017 when General Motors halted sales in domestic Indian market.

===== 2013 recall in India =====
In July 2013, General Motors recalled 114,000 Chevrolet Taveras in India, as the vehicle failed to meet local emission standards. GM India also were ordered to suspend the production of the Tavera until the issues were resolved.

Svenska Dagbladet reported that employees of General Motors had misled Indian authorities about the exhaust emission and fuel consumption by equipping vehicles to be tested with smaller and specially prepared engines to pass regulations. As a result of this, GM's powertrain division manager Sam Winegarden was fired, along with other employees. The report led to the Indian authorities starting an investigation into General Motors' practices.

==== Indonesia ====
In Indonesia, Tavera served as a petrol version of Isuzu Panther, while the latter is only offered with diesel engine. It is powered by a 2.2 L petrol, 114 PS (84 kW) & 180 N⋅m (133 lb⋅ft) sourced from GM, which also used by the Indonesian version of Opel/Chevrolet Blazer. It was discontinued in 2005 due to low demand.

==== Engines ====
Petrol Engines
Engine Model	Type	Bore	Stroke	Displacement	Compression ratio	Power	Torque	Year
C22NE	Inline 4 8V SOHC MPFI	86.0	94.6	2198 cc	9.2:1	85 kW (114 hp; 116 PS)@ 5000 rpm	180 N⋅m (133 lb⋅ft) @3600 rpm	2001–2005
Diesel Engines
4JA1	Inline 4 8V OHV Direct Injection	93.0	92.0	2499 cc	18.5:1	59.5 kW (80 hp; 81 PS)@ 3900 rpm	170 N⋅m (125 lb⋅ft) @ 2300 rpm	2001–2006 (PH)
4JA1-L	Inline 4 8V OHV DI Turbo (Low pressure)	93.0	92.0	2499 cc	18.5:1	62.5 kW (84 hp; 85 PS)@ 3900 rpm (EURO-II)	185 N⋅m (136 lb⋅ft) @ 2000 rpm	2000–2020 2001–2017 (PH)
4JA1-L	Inline 4 8V OHV DI Turbo (Low pressure)	93.0	92.0	2499 cc	18.5:1	54 kW (72 hp; 73 PS)@ 3900 rpm (BS-3)	171 N⋅m (126 lb⋅ft) @ 1800 rpm	2004–2016 (India)
4JA1-CR	Inline 4 8V OHV CRDI Turbo	93.0	92.0	2499 cc	16.6:1	58 kW (78 hp; 79 PS)@ 3800 rpm (BS-4)	176 N⋅m (130 lb⋅ft) @ 1400-2600 rpm	2016–2017 (India)
ICML G2	Inline 4 8V SOHC CRDI VGT	84.5	88.9	1994 cc	17.5:1	78.3 kW (105 hp; 106 PS)@ 4000 rpm (BS-4)	261 N⋅m (193 lb⋅ft) @ 2500 rpm	2012–2015 (India)

== Discontinuation ==
On February 10, 2021, Isuzu Astra Motor Indonesia confirmed that both the first generation Panther pickup truck and the second generation Panther station wagon were officially discontinued without its replacement. Production of the Panther ended one year prior, in February 2020, when the last units of the Panther rolled off its assembly line.
