= Isuzu Traga =

Cab over pickup truck

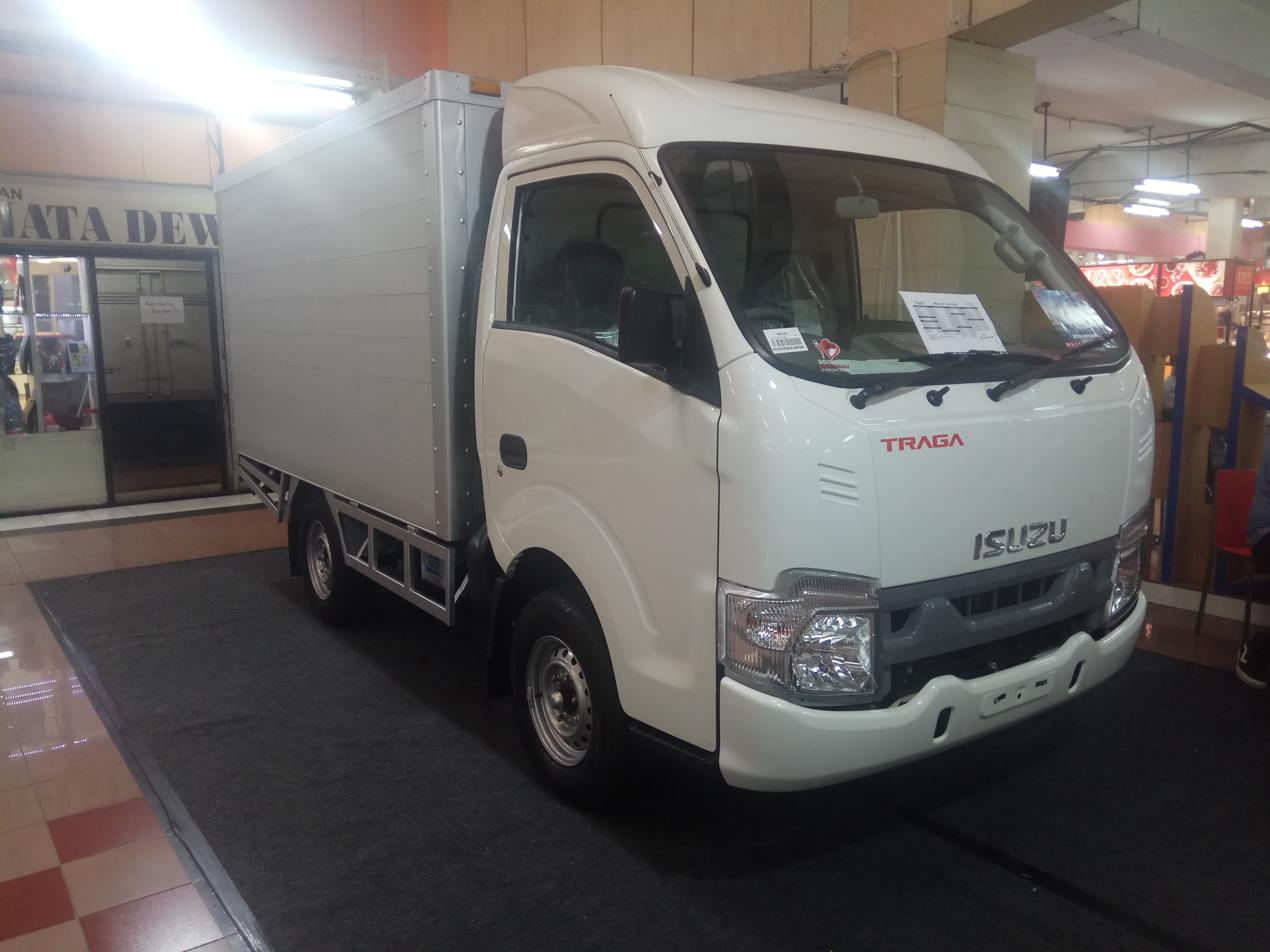
- 2019 Isuzu Traga Box (Indonesia)

Overview
- Manufacturer: Isuzu
- Model code: PHR54
- Also called: Isuzu Traviz (Philippines); Isuzu P-Series
- Production: 2018–present
- Assembly: Indonesia: Karawang, West Java (Isuzu Astra Motor Indonesia)

Body and chassis
- Class: Light commercial vehicle
- Body style: 2-door pickup
- Layout: Front mid-engine, rear-wheel-drive

Powertrain
- Engine: 2.5 L 4JA1-L direct-injected low-pressure turbodiesel I4 (Traga); 2.5 L 4JA1-CR BluePower common rail direct-injected turbodiesel I4 (Traviz and Traga Euro 4)
- Power output: 63 kW (84 hp; 86 PS) (Traga); 57.5 kW (77 hp; 78 PS) (Traviz)
- Transmission: 5-speed manual

Dimensions
- Wheelbase: 2,250 mm (88.6 in) (Traga/Traviz S); 2,400 mm (94.5 in) (Traviz L)
- Length: 4,450 mm (175.2 in) (Box/Traviz S); 4,520 mm (178.0 in) (Flat Deck); 4,600 mm (181.1 in) (Traviz L)
- Width: 1,705 mm (67.1 in) (Flat Deck); 1,750 mm (68.9 in) (Box)
- Height: 1,985 mm (78.1 in) (Flat Deck); 2,260 mm (89.0 in) (Box)

Chronology
- Predecessor: Isuzu Bison; Isuzu Panther pickup

The Isuzu Traga is a small cab over pickup truck manufactured by Isuzu since 2018. It is developed to compete with the Mitsubishi L300 in the Indonesian medium pickup truck market. It replaces the L300-based Bison and Panther pickup in the market.

It is manufactured and primarily sold in Indonesia, and is exported to other Southeast Asian countries since 2019 as well. The Philippines is the first export destination, where it is sold as the Isuzu Traviz.

The "Traga" name is derived from the phrase "X-tra (Ekstra) Lega", which means "extra spacious" in Indonesian.

== Overview ==
The Traga was launched in Indonesia on 23 April 2018, and is offered in two variants: Flat Deck and Box. The Flat Deck variant has a rear bed dimension of 2,810 mm × 1,620 mm × 300 mm (110.6 in × 63.8 in × 11.8 in) and is claimed by Isuzu to be the biggest in its class.

In the Philippines, the Traviz was launched on 13 November 2019 and is available in two body styles: S and L. Before the "Traviz" name is used, it was showcased as under the "VT02" name in October 2018. The name "Traviz" is derived from the words "Travel" and "Biz", shorthand for "Business".

== Engine ==
The Traga is powered by a direct-injected low-pressure turbocharged 2.5-litre 4JA1-L inline-four diesel engine taken from the Panther. It produces a power output of 59 kW (79 hp; 80 PS) at 3,500 rpm and 191 N⋅m (141 lb⋅ft) of torque at 1,800 rpm, with a claimed fuel economy of 13 km/L (7.7 L/100 km; 37 mpg_{‑imp}; 31 mpg_{‑US}).

The Traviz uses a Euro 4 compliant common rail direct-injected version of the 4JA1 engine, the 4JA1-CR. It produces 57.5 kW (77 hp; 78 PS) at 3,900 rpm and 176.5 N⋅m (130.2 lb⋅ft) of torque at 1,800 rpm. This engine would later be used in the Traga when Indonesia introduced Euro 4 emission standards for diesel-powered vehicles in 2022.

== Gallery ==
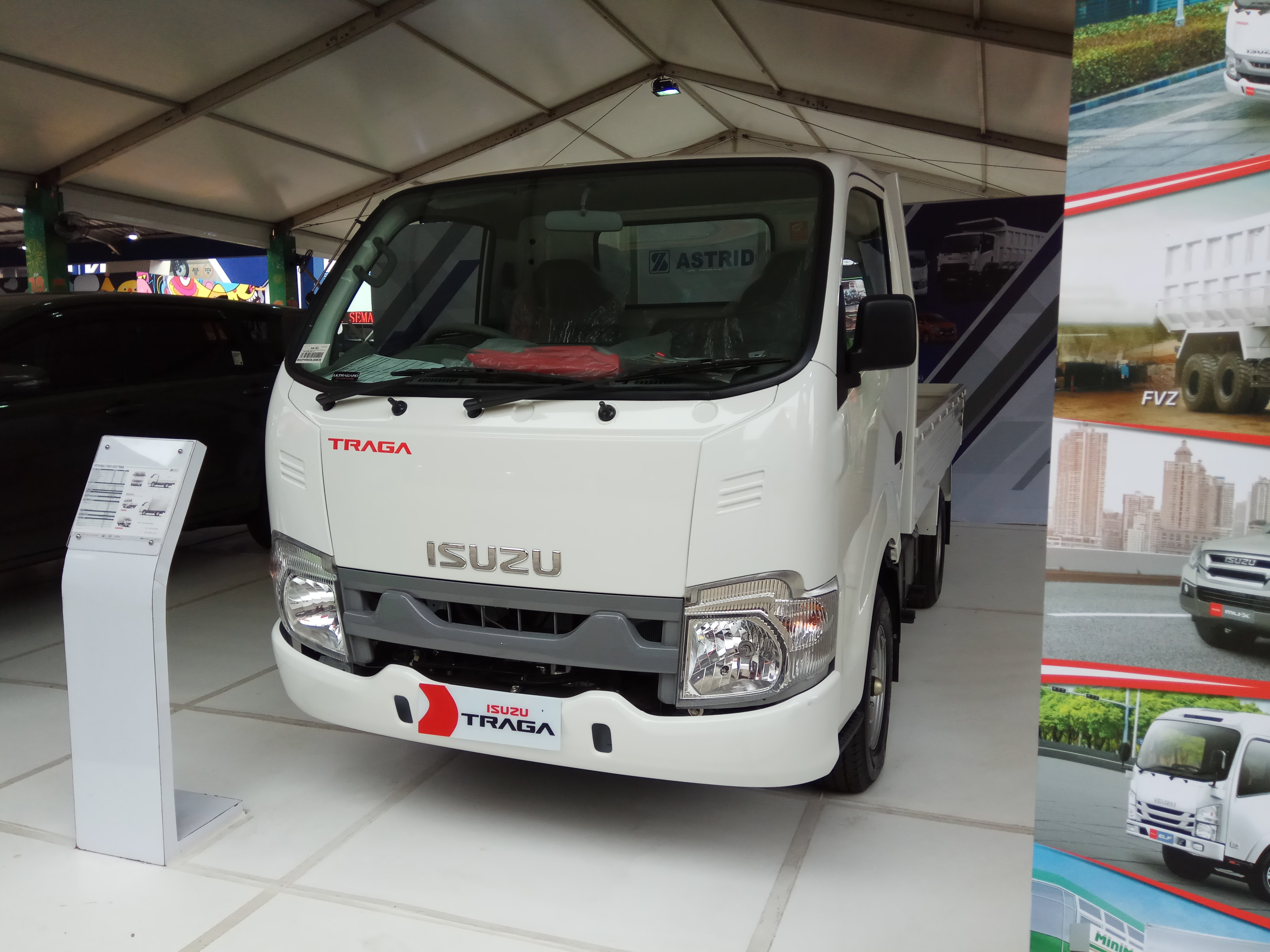
2019 Isuzu Traga Flat Deck (Indonesia)

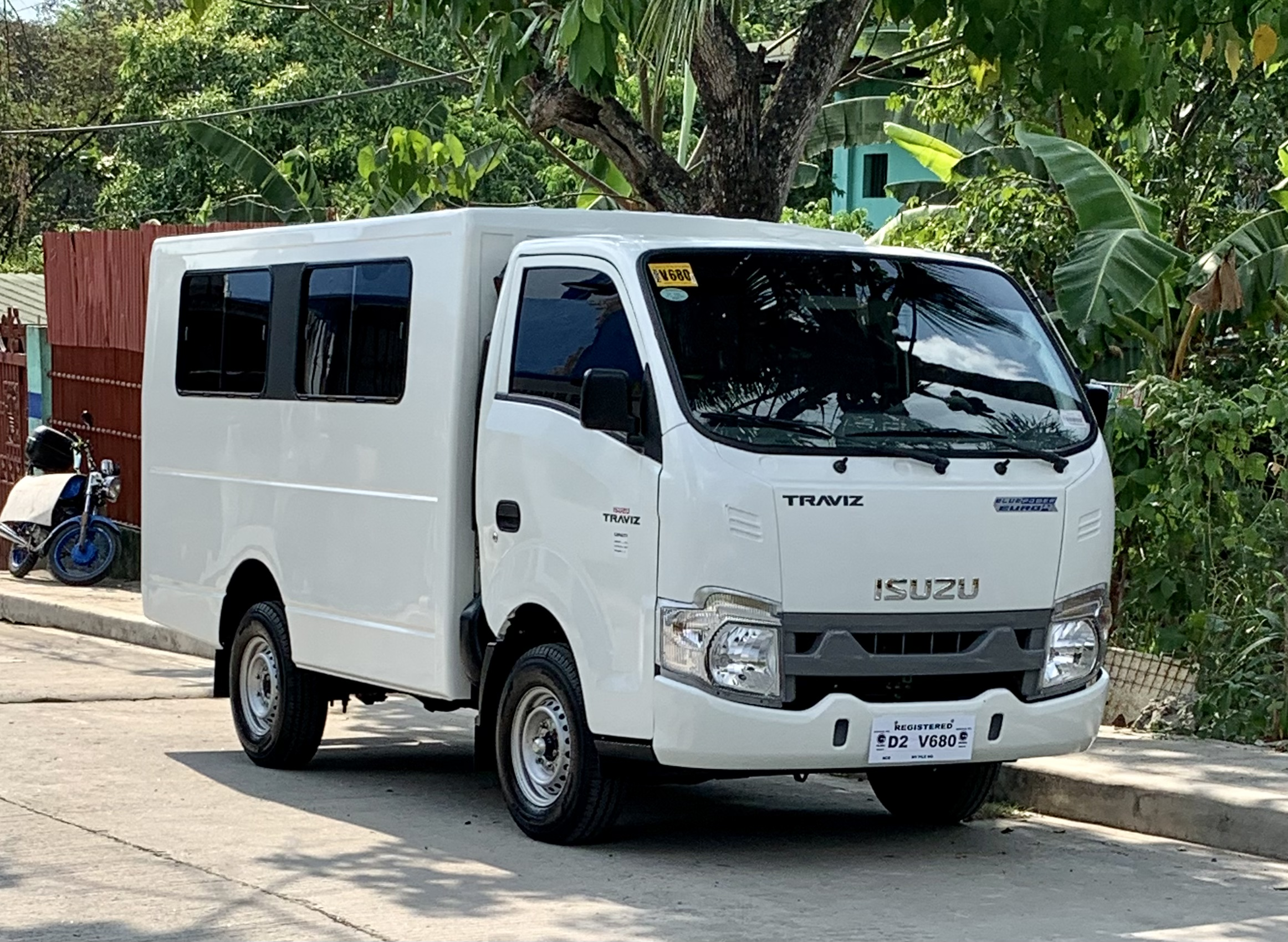
2022 Isuzu Traviz Utility Van (Philippines)

== Sales ==
Year	Indonesia	Philippines
2018	3,043	
2019	6,362	20,519
2020	6,769	20,519
2021	12,392	20,519
2022	12,921	20,519
2023	>11,000	20,519
