= Duramax =

Duramax is a brand of turbocharged diesel engines marketed by General Motors. It may refer to:

- Duramax V8 engine, a 6.6L V8 engine designed and built by General Motors
- Duramax I6 engine, a 3.0L inline six-cylinder engine used in the 1500-series GMT T1XX pickup trucks and SUVs
- Duramax I4 engine, a 2.8L inline four-cylinder engine used by GM
- Isuzu 6HK1 engine, a 7.8L inline six-cylinder engine, known as "Duramax 7800" in GM medium-duty trucks
- VM Motori A 428 DOHC, a 2.8L inline four-cylinder engine that was used in GM's mid-size pickup trucks and full-size vans from 2016 to 2022
