= Isuzu Forward =

Line of medium-duty commercial vehicles manufactured by Isuzu

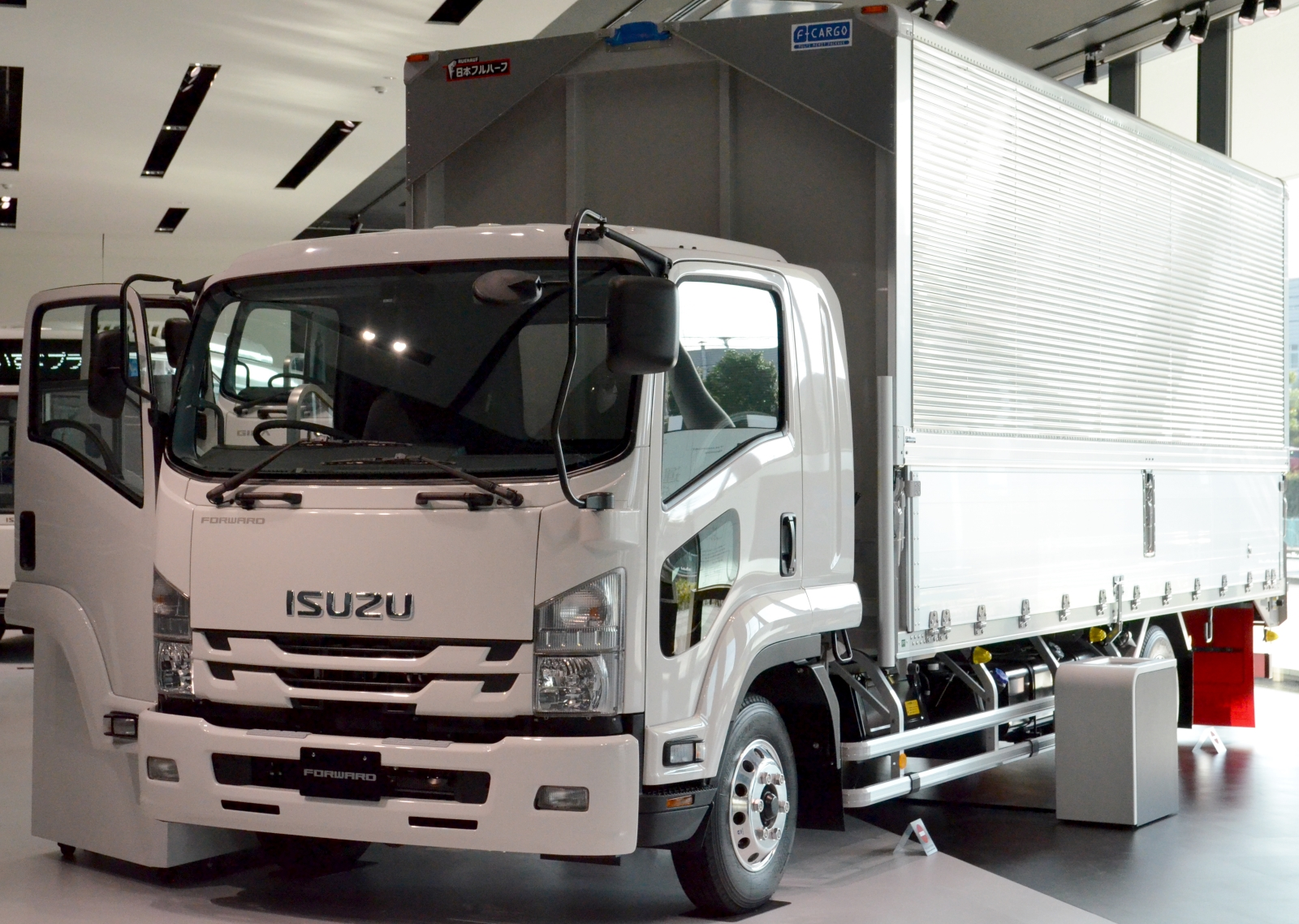

Overview
- Manufacturer: Isuzu
- Also called: Isuzu Borneo/Giga (Indonesia); Isuzu Forward Juston (Japan and Philippines); Isuzu F-Series; Isuzu Heavy Duty; Isuzu Deca (Thailand); Isuzu Rocky (Thailand); Isuzu Tora (Turkey); Chevrolet/GMC T-Series (United States; 1997–2009); Chevrolet F-Series (Latin America); Chevrolet LCF 6500–7500XD (United States); UD Condor (2017–present)
- Production: 1966–present
- Assembly: Japan: Fujisawa, Kanagawa; Philippines: Biñan, Laguna, (IPC); Russia: Ulyanovsk (Sollers-Isuzu); China: Chongqing (Qingling); Vietnam: Ho Chi Minh City (IVC); India: Kolkata (Hindustan Motors); Chile: Huechuraba; Indonesia: Karawang (IAMI); Nigeria: Lagos (GMNL); Malaysia: Pekan (Isuzu HICOM); Pakistan: Karachi (Ghandhara Industries); Turkey: Istanbul (Anadolu Isuzu); Azerbaijan: Baku; United States: Janesville, WI, Flint, MI, Charlotte, Michigan

Body and chassis
- Class: Medium duty truck
- Body style: 2-door standard cab (Worldwide); 4-door crew cab (Certain regions only)
- Layout: FMR layout

Powertrain
- Engine: 5.4L 6BB1 I6; 5.8L 6BD1 / 6BD1T I6; 6.5L 6BG1 / 6BG1T I6; 8.2L 6HH1 I6; 9.8L 6SD1 I6; 7.8L 6HK1 I6; 5.2L 4HK1 I4; 7.8L 6NX1-TCS VGS Turbo I6 6.0L GM small block V8
- Transmission: 5-speed manual; 6-speed manual; 4-speed automatic; 6-speed automatic; 9-speed Eaton Fuller Synchronized Transmission; 10-speed automatic

Chronology
- Predecessor: Isuzu TY/Isuzu TX/TXD

The Isuzu Forward (Japanese: いすゞ・フォワード, Isuzu Fowādo) (also known as the Isuzu F-Series) is a line of medium-to-heavy-duty commercial vehicles manufactured by Isuzu since 1970, following the earlier TY model which occupied the same slot in the market. All F-series trucks are cab over designs and the cabin comes fully built from the factory. Most models come with a diesel engine; but, some markets get CNG derivatives as well. The F-series is available a variety of cab styles, engines, 4WD or 2WD depending on the market it is sold. While Isuzu's main plant is in Japan, these trucks are locally assembled from CKD kits in numerous countries.

Most mid-size and big-size models of the truck are distinguishable by a front 'Forward' badge; but the common Isuzu badge is usually used on the rear. Confusingly, the smaller Isuzu Elf (N-Series) has been sold as the "GMC Forward" in the United States and other markets.

The Isuzu Forward is among the commercial grade trucks used by the Japan Ground Self-Defense Force for rear line duties.

== Isuzu TY (predecessor) ==
Isuzu released the 4-tonne (8,800 lb) TY-series in May 1966. This semi-cabover design was Isuzu's first medium-duty truck. The original engine fitted was the D370, a 3.6 L (3,644 cc) inline-six diesel engine with 100 PS (74 kW). The types were TY20, TY30, and TY40 depending on the length of the chassis. That engine was later replaced by the 4.0 L (3,988 cc) D400 engine with 102 PS (75 kW), accompanied by a change in model codes to TY21/31/41. In August 1967 two 3.5-tonne (7,700 lb) models, TY31(S) and TY41(S), were added. There was also an extra long wheelbase model (available with an extended cab) called the TY51. The TY range received a light facelift in March 1968, including a redesigned grille.

== First generation (1970) ==
The first generation Forward (TR) was launched in April 1970, replacing the original TY-series. All of the original models came equipped with Isuzu's D500 diesel engine, a 5.0 L (4,978 cc) inline-six with 125 PS (92 kW). In July 1971 this engine was upgraded to produce 130 PS (96 kW). In September 1972 the Forward received a facelift and a new model code (SBR). The D500 engine was largely replaced with the new 5.4 L (5,393 cc) 6BB1 direct injection inline-six producing 145 PS (107 kW). Only certain lighter duty versions, such as the fire truck, retained the smaller D500 engine. The glowplug equipped 6BB1 had the smallest displacement per cylinder of any direct injection diesel engine in the world at the time and went on to power a large number of the Forward, the Elf, and many other Isuzu vehicles for the coming decades.

A variety of weight ranges, bodies, and types were on offer, including a tractor unit and dumpers, on wheelbases ranging from 3.2 to 5.6 m (10 to 18 ft). While most of the first generation Forward range was replaced in August 1975, the lighter short cab versions continued in production as the "Forward S" until replaced by Forward Juston in 1986.

== Second generation (SBR/JBR/FBR) (1975) ==
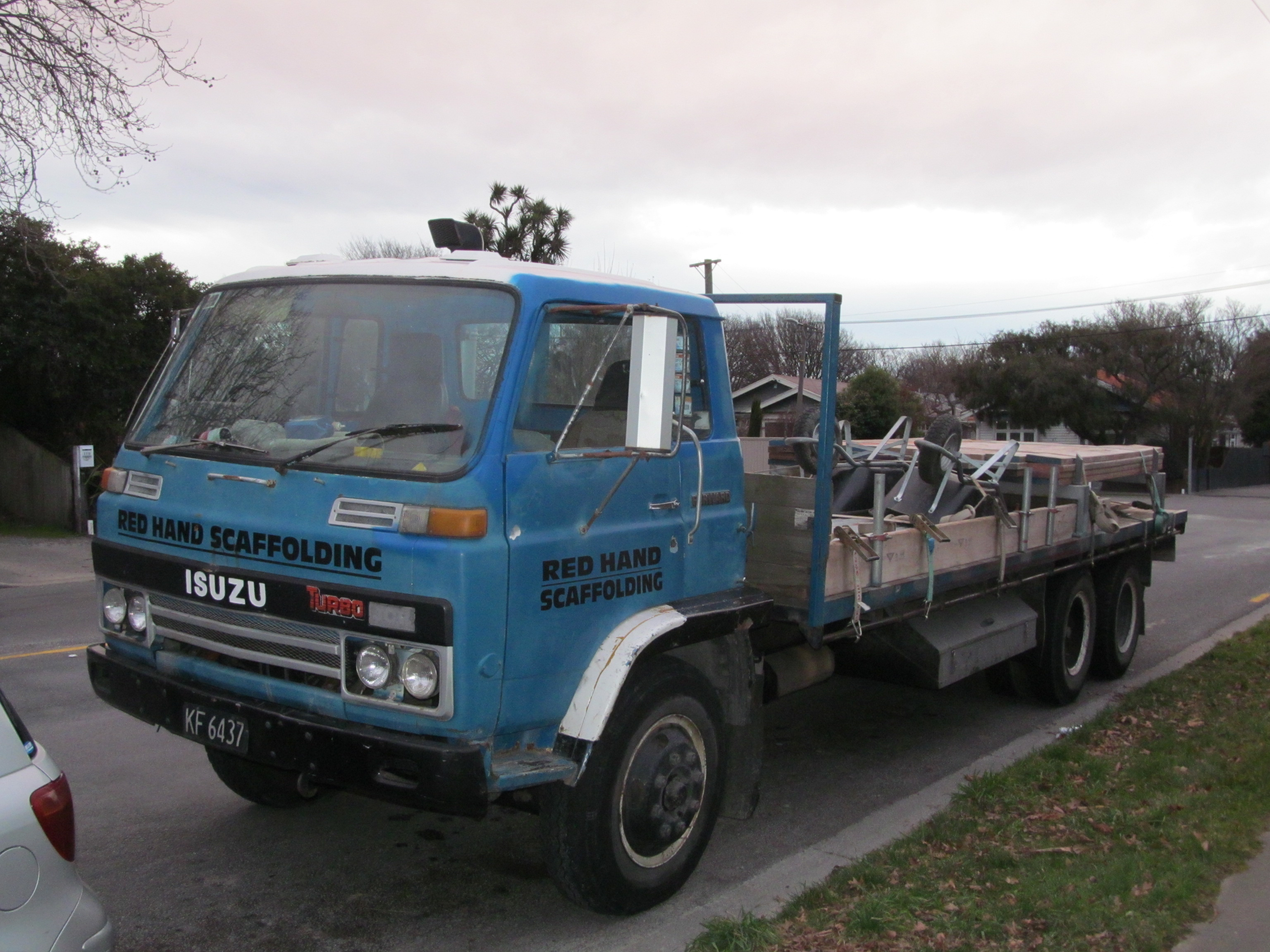
Second Generation Isuzu Forward JCR500S (1982)

The Second Generation Forward (SBR-series) was released in August 1975. The original range could carry between 4 and 4.5 tonnes (8,800 and 9,900 lb) and was powered by the same Isuzu 6BB1 diesel engine that had been used in most of the first-generation Forwards, a 5.4 L (5,393 cc) diesel inline-six with 145 PS (107 kW). The SBR was later complemented with new heavier-duty versions (J- and F-series) equipped with the larger 6BD1, 6BD1T, and 6BF1 engines.

- JBR/JCR/JDR (6-7t)
- FTM (10t)

Semi-tractor

- VDR (4.5t, 5t)

4WD

- SCS (4t)

== Third generation (JCR/FTR/FVR/FSR/FRR/FVZ) (1985) ==
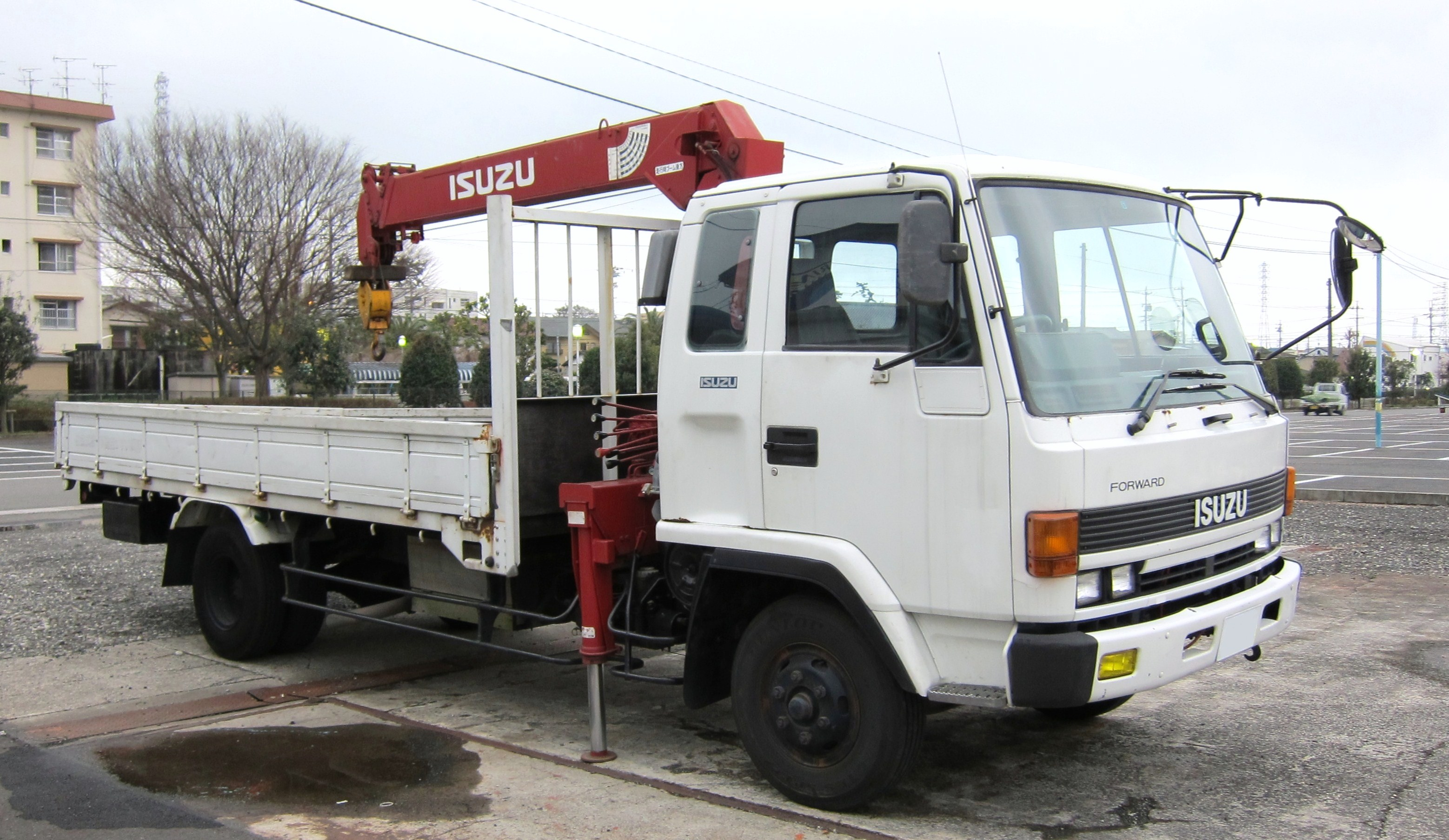
Third Generation Forward with crane

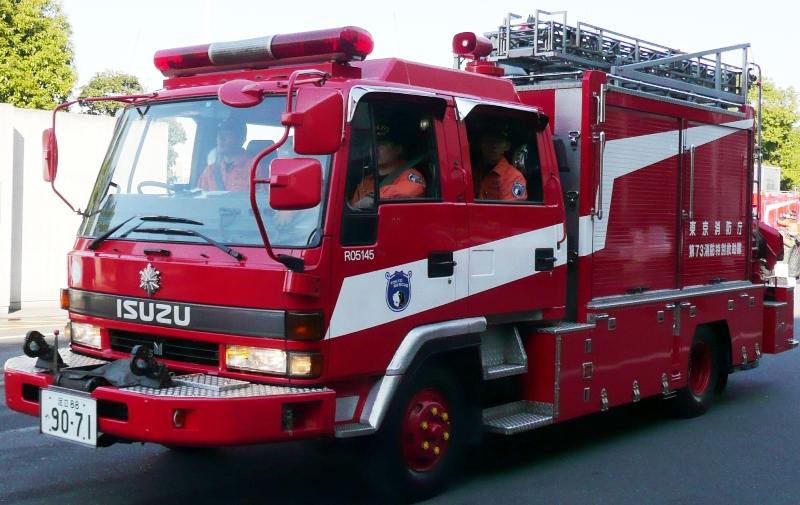
Isuzu Forward fire engine in Japan

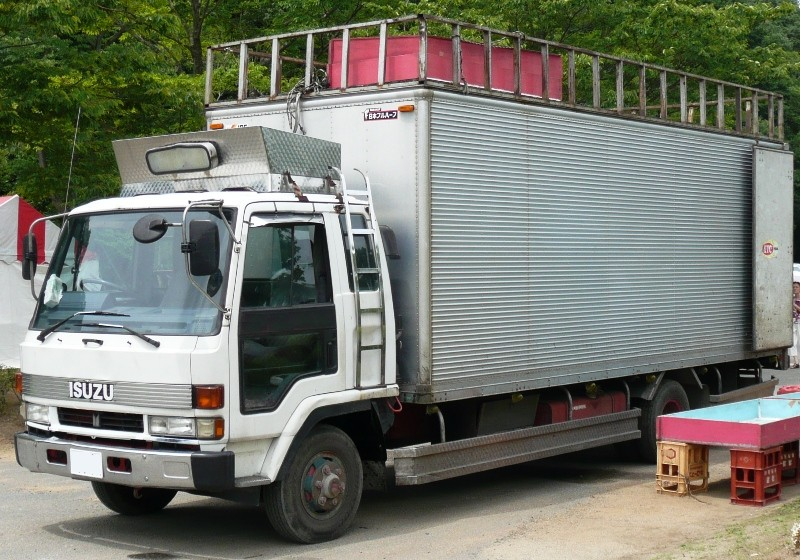
Third Generation Forward with updated headlamps

The third generation Forward was launched in June 1985, with a cab design based on that of the 810. It was the first truck to win the Good Design Award.

The FTR, FVR, FSR and FRR are all equipped with naturally aspirated and turbocharged Isuzu 6BG1 and 6HE1 engines mated to the six-speed manual or NAVi6 six-speed automatic gearbox with an optional ABS. A 1992–1994 Isuzu Forward truck appears in a scene of Studio Ghibli's 1994 animated movie Pom Poko.

== Fourth generation (1994) ==
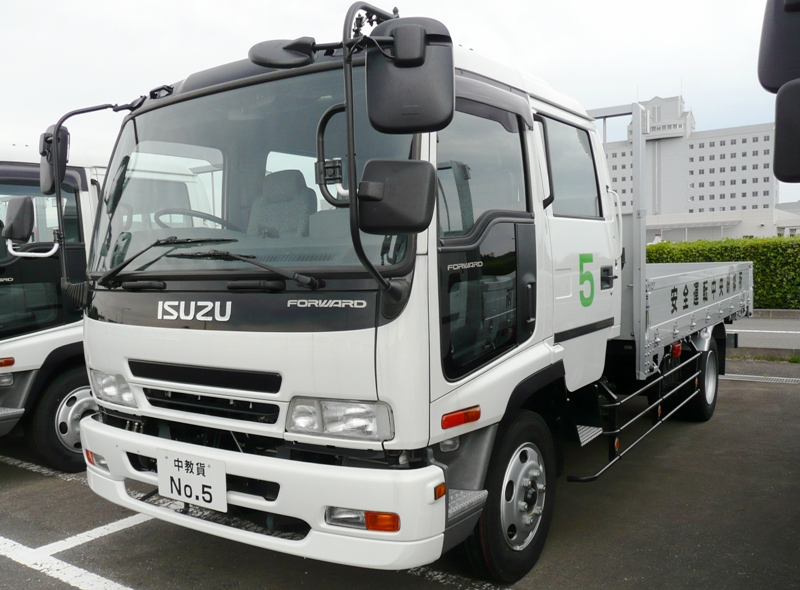
Fourth Generation Forward with flatbed

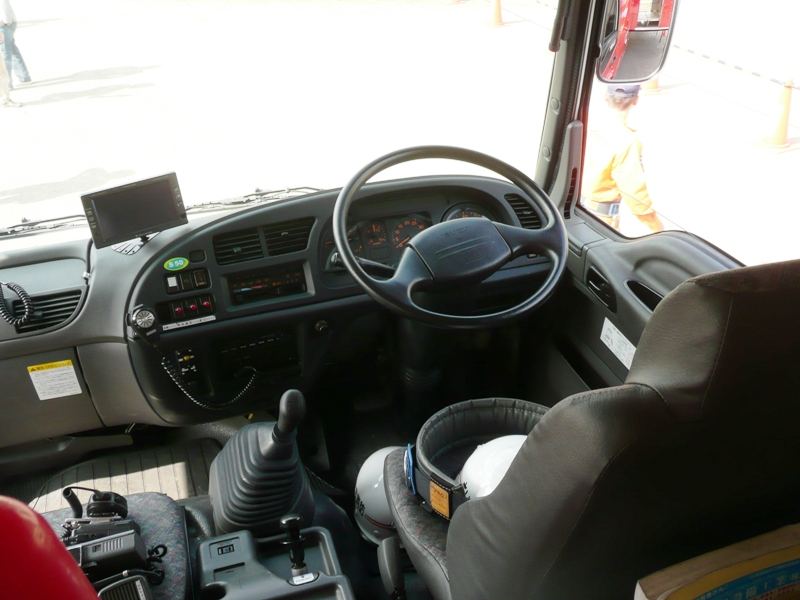
Interior

The fourth generation Forward was released in February 1994 with all SOHC engines starting with the naturally aspirated or turbocharged 6HE1 until 1999 and replaced with the new 8.2 litre 6HH1 and 7.8 litre 6HK1-TC (also shared with the American-developed Isuzu H-series) engines mated to the six-speed manual or Isuzu's 'Smoother F' automatic gearbox, with Power Shift and HSA are standard equipment, only the ABS/ASR are optional.

For the Chilean and Peruvian markets, the trucks were shipped from Japan as CKD kits to Huechuraba, Chile, where up to two a day could be assembled by a team of 13 workers.

Beginning in 1998, this generation of the Forward was sold in the United States and Canada with Chevrolet and GMC badging. They were called the T-series, followed by a four-digit number indicating the weight rating. Models included the T6500, T7500, and the T8500. The range received an updated 6H engine in 2008 but sales of this model ended in 2009.

Models

- FTR (8 t)
- FRR (4 t)
- FSR (5 t, 6.5 t, 7 t)
- FVR (9 t)
- FVZ (10 t)
- FRD (4 t)
- FSD (5 t, 7 t)

== Fifth generation (2007) ==
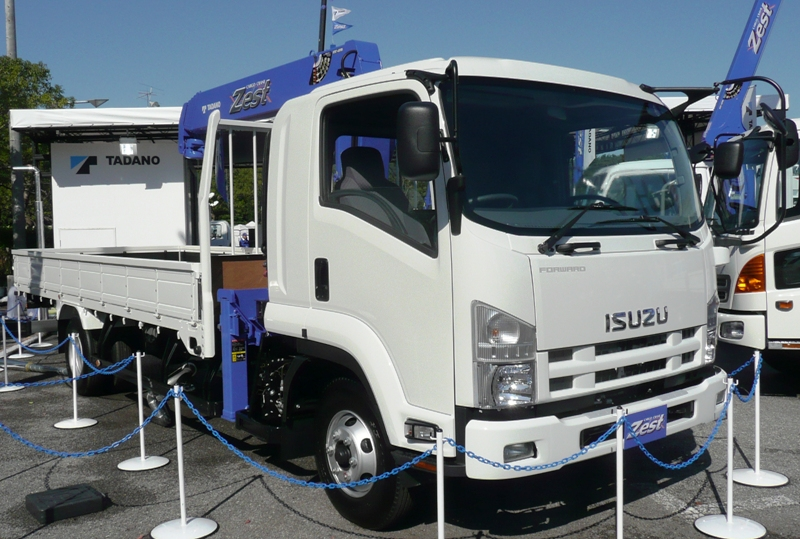
Fifth Generation Forward with Tadano Crane

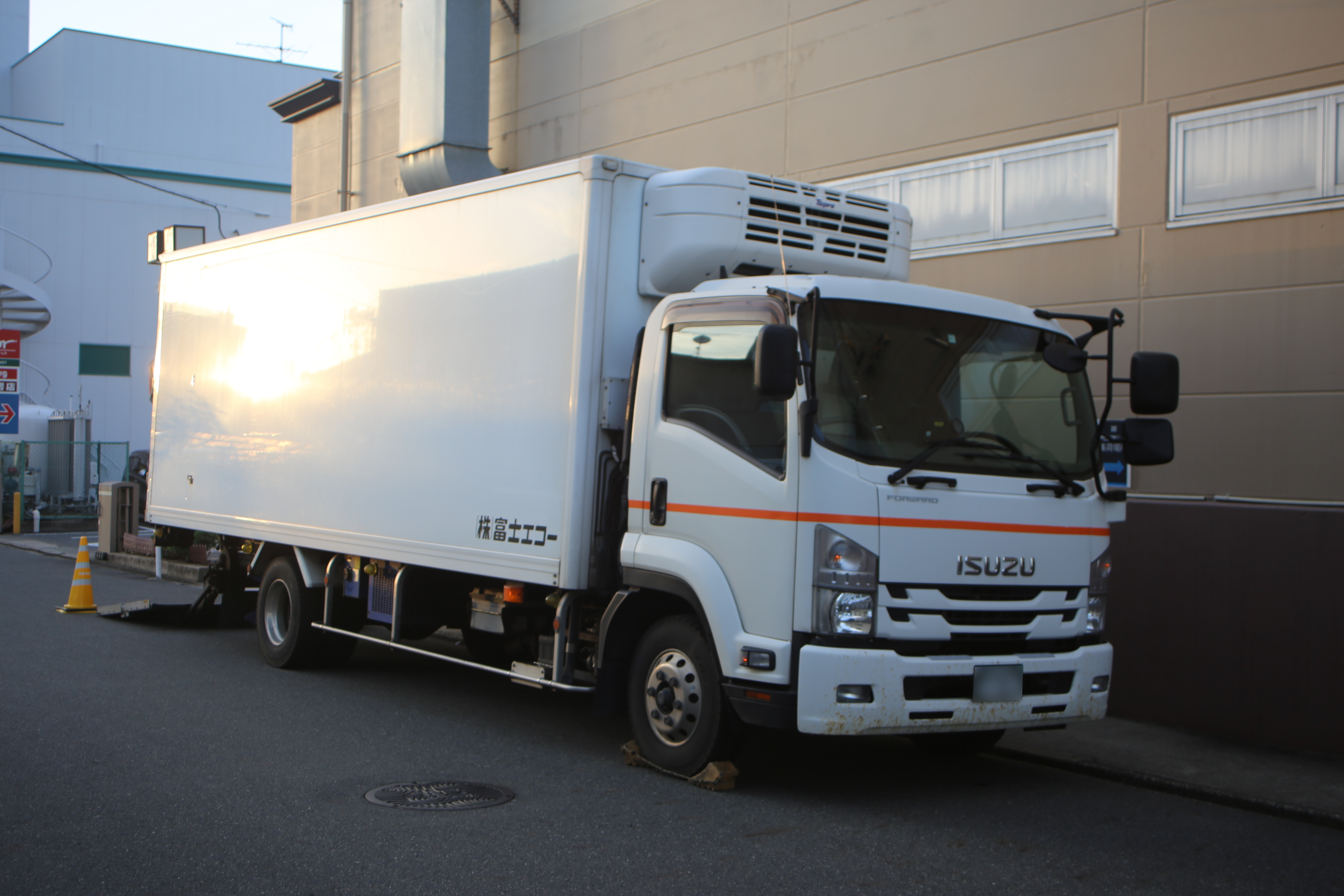
Isuzu Forward refrigerated van (first facelift)

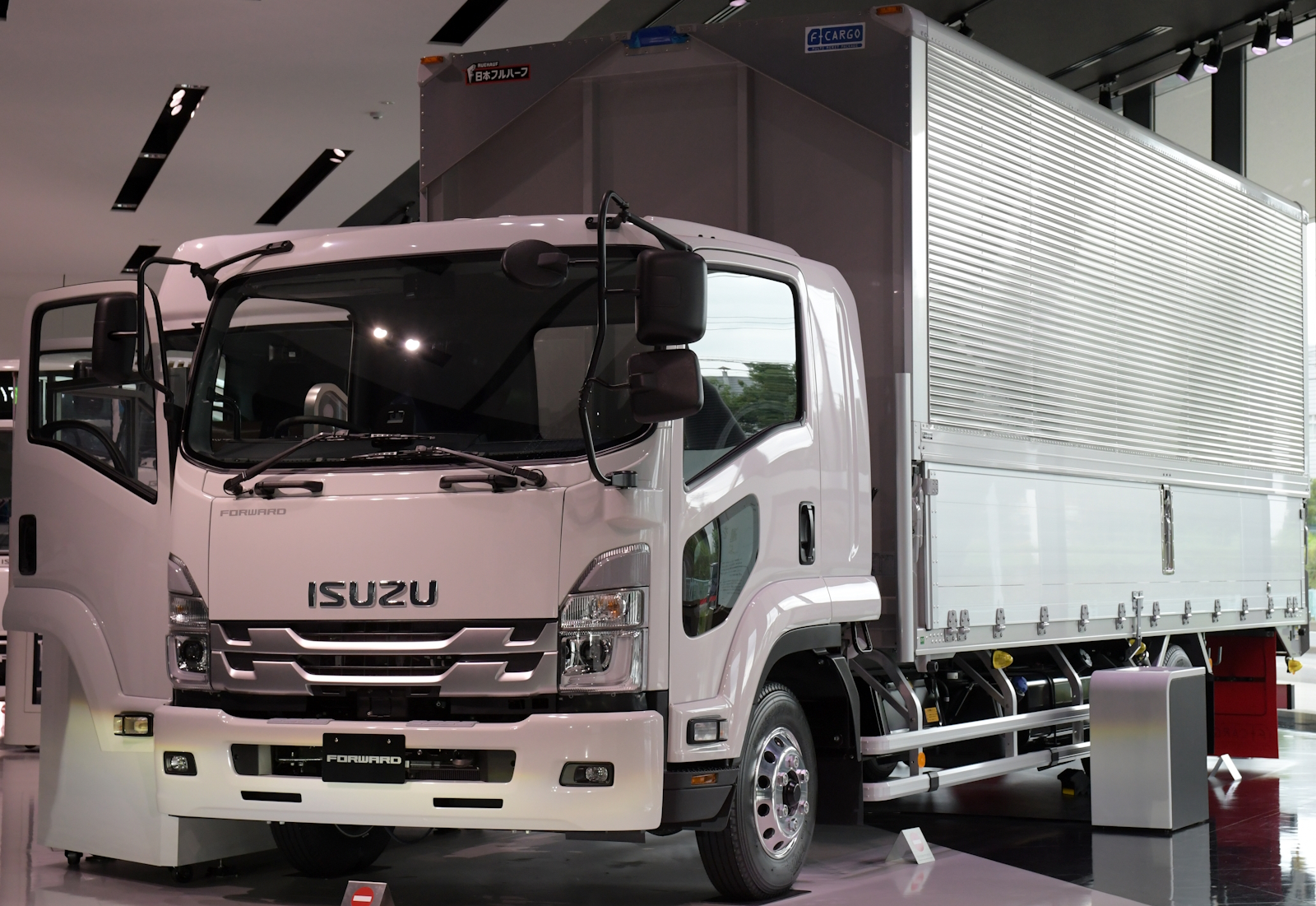
2021 Updated Isuzu Forward with custom chrome grill

Interior

The fifth generation Forward was launched in May 2007; all models are equipped with Isuzu 4H/6H engines. A new 6x6 variant was exhibited at the 43rd Tokyo Motor Show in 2013.

In North America, it was introduced in 2017 for the 2018 model year.

In Thailand, the 2022 model year saw the LED projector headlight and interior updates for some models, and they also introduced the FRR 210 Max Torque as well.

== Sixth generation (2023) ==
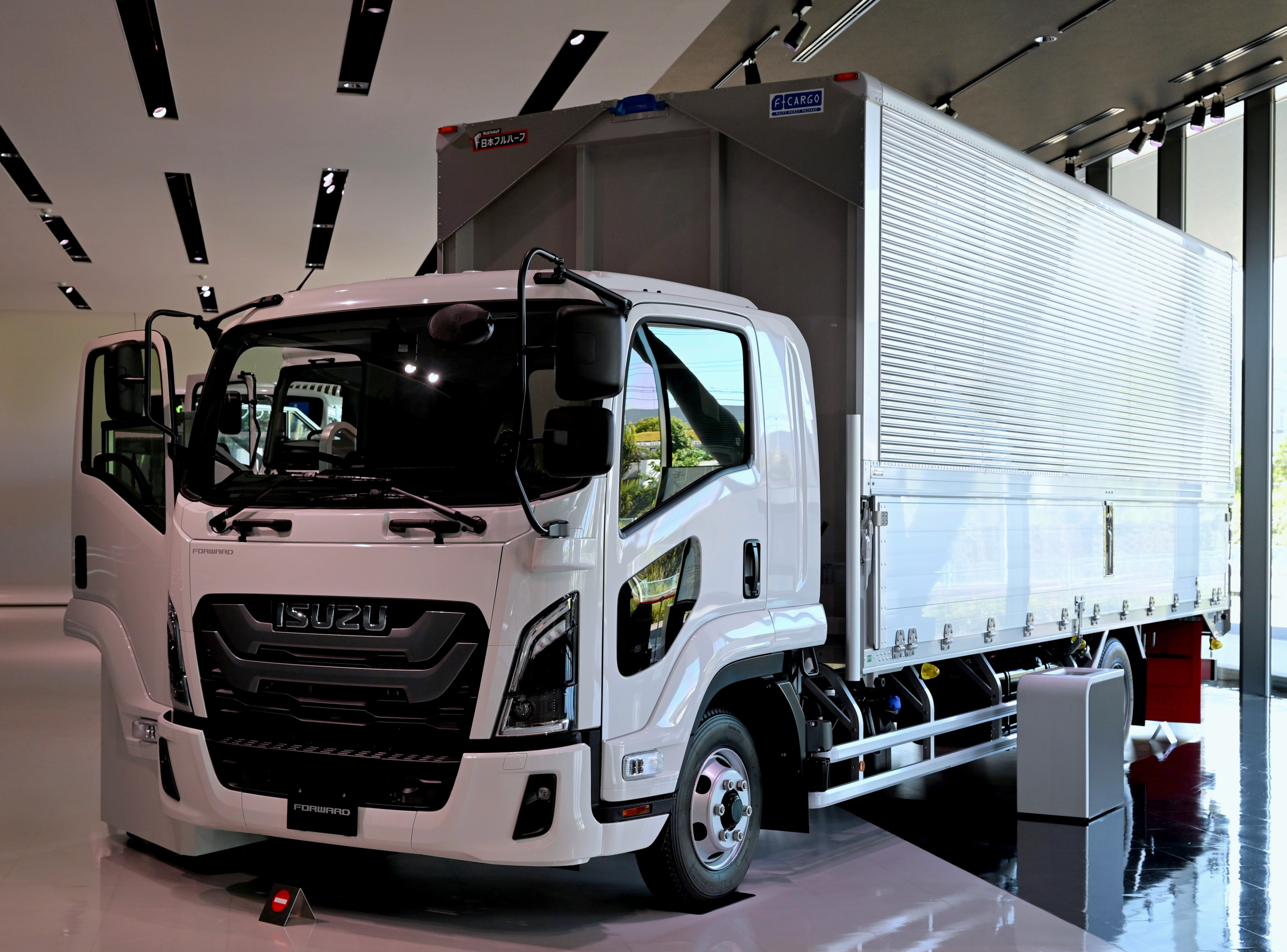
6th generation Forward with wing van

The sixth generation Forward was launched in March 2023 and went sale in August 2023. The 6th generation Forward also has powertrain updates to meet the upcoming fuel efficiency regulations.

It shares the same cab as the Elf but it has a different side fenders. It adopted the company's first common architecture strategy called I-MACS or Isuzu Modular Architecture and Component Standard that standardizes the key modules such as the engine, transmission, fuel tank, axles and safety features to allow flexibility and diverse needs worldwide.

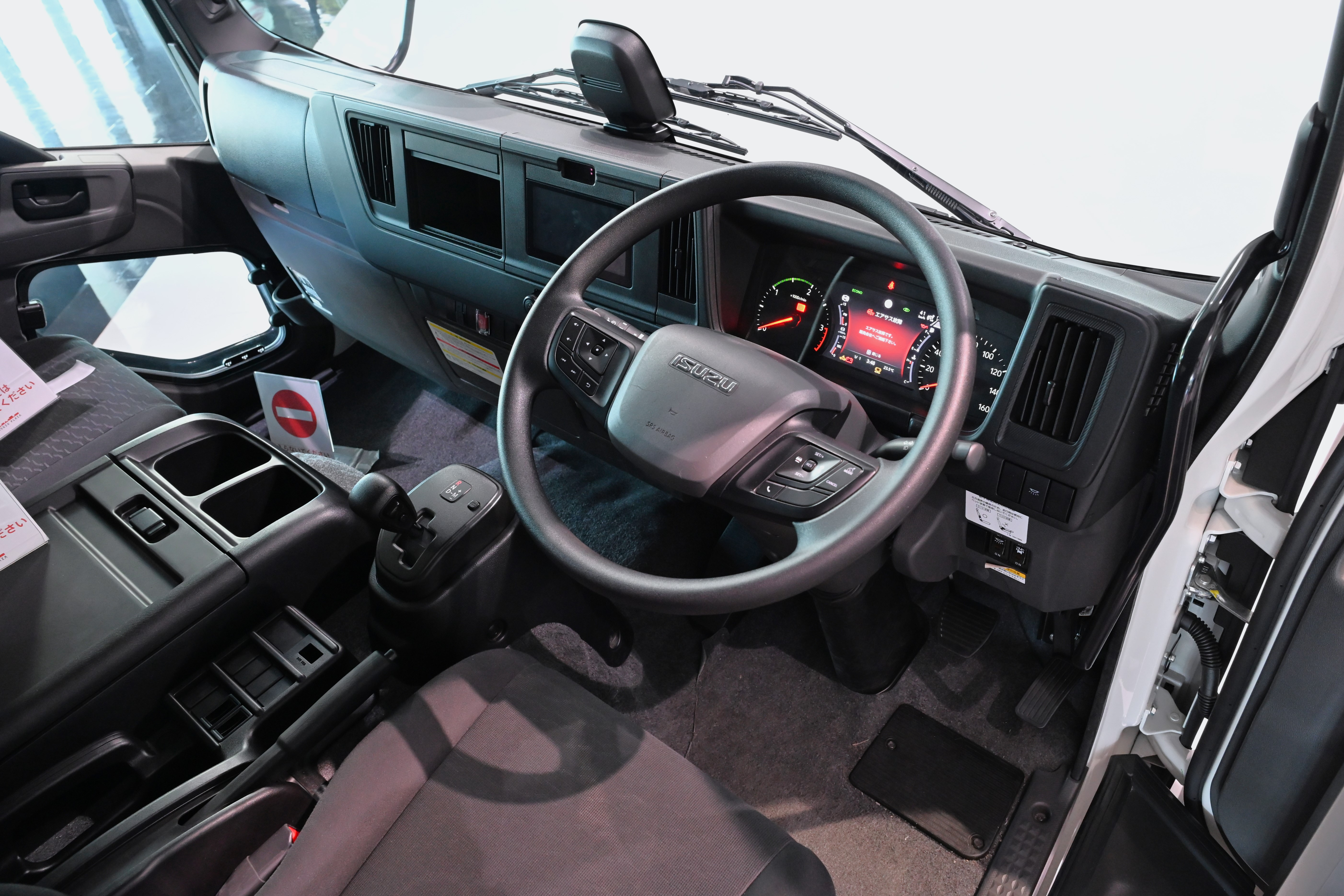
Interior

Interior

The new Forward features new 7 inch display similar to the Elf, a smaller steering wheel and upgraded seats with full recline.

Safety

Safety features were enhanced across four main packages:

BASIC: mandatory safety equipment (standard on smaller models)

STANDARD: adds adaptive headlights, speed sign recognition, and driver monitoring

ADVANCE: adds adaptive cruise control, emergency stop system (EDSS), and electronic parking brake

PREMIUM: offers lane-keep assist, enhanced EDSS, and blind spot monitoring

Engine

Engine options are the 4HK1 engine now uses DPD with Urea SCR emission treatment, the inline six options for the heavier version are the all new Cummins co-developed D6BA-TCN and D6BA-TCC producing 260 and 300 PS respectively, mated to either a 9 speed manual or isuzu's Smoother-Fx Automated manual transmission.

=== Safety ===
Euro NCAP test results Isuzu F-Series 4x2 Rigid (2026)
Test	Score
Overall:	2 /5 stars
Safe driving	67%
Crash avoidance	29%
Post crash	80%

== Forward Juston ==
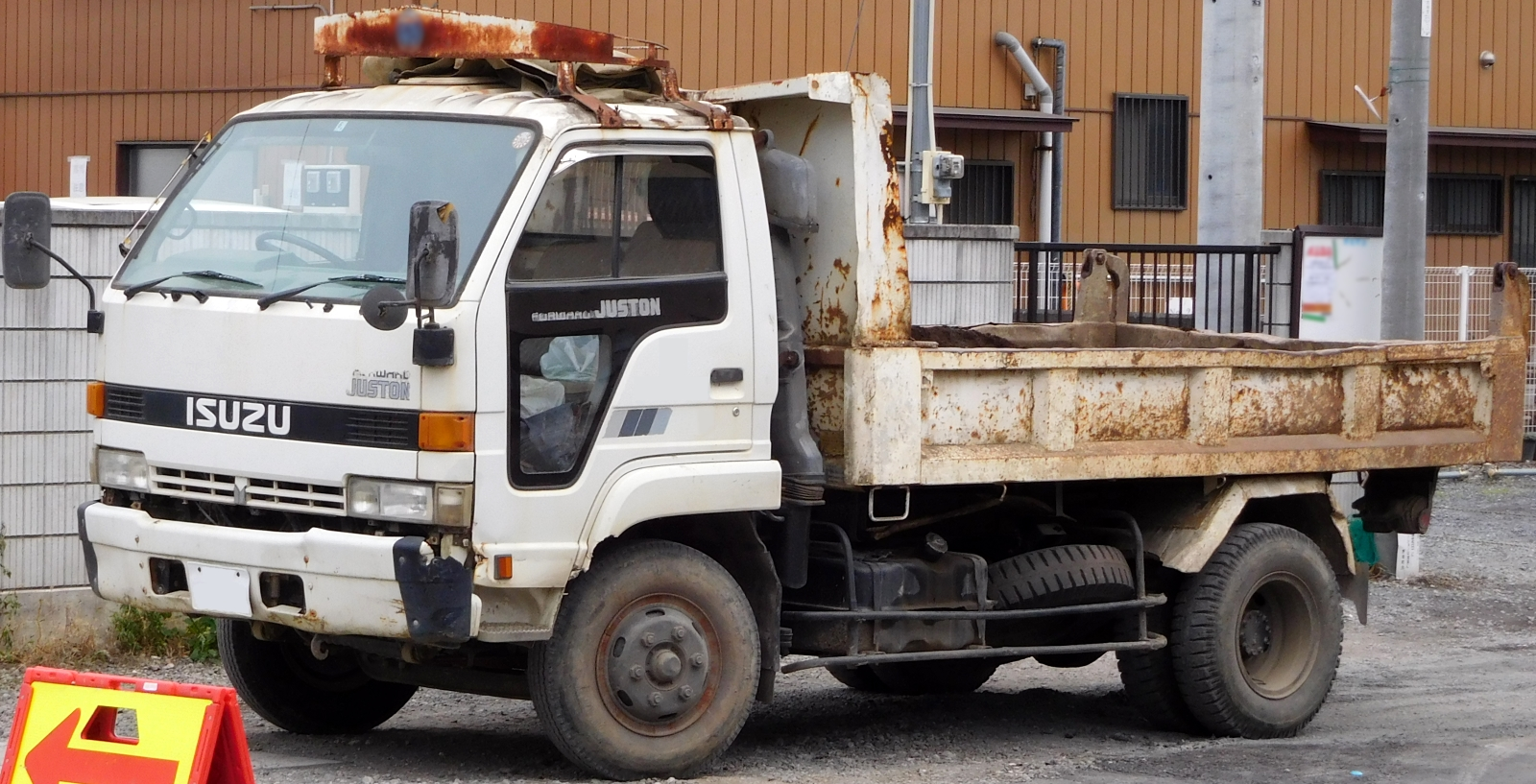
First generation Forward Juston

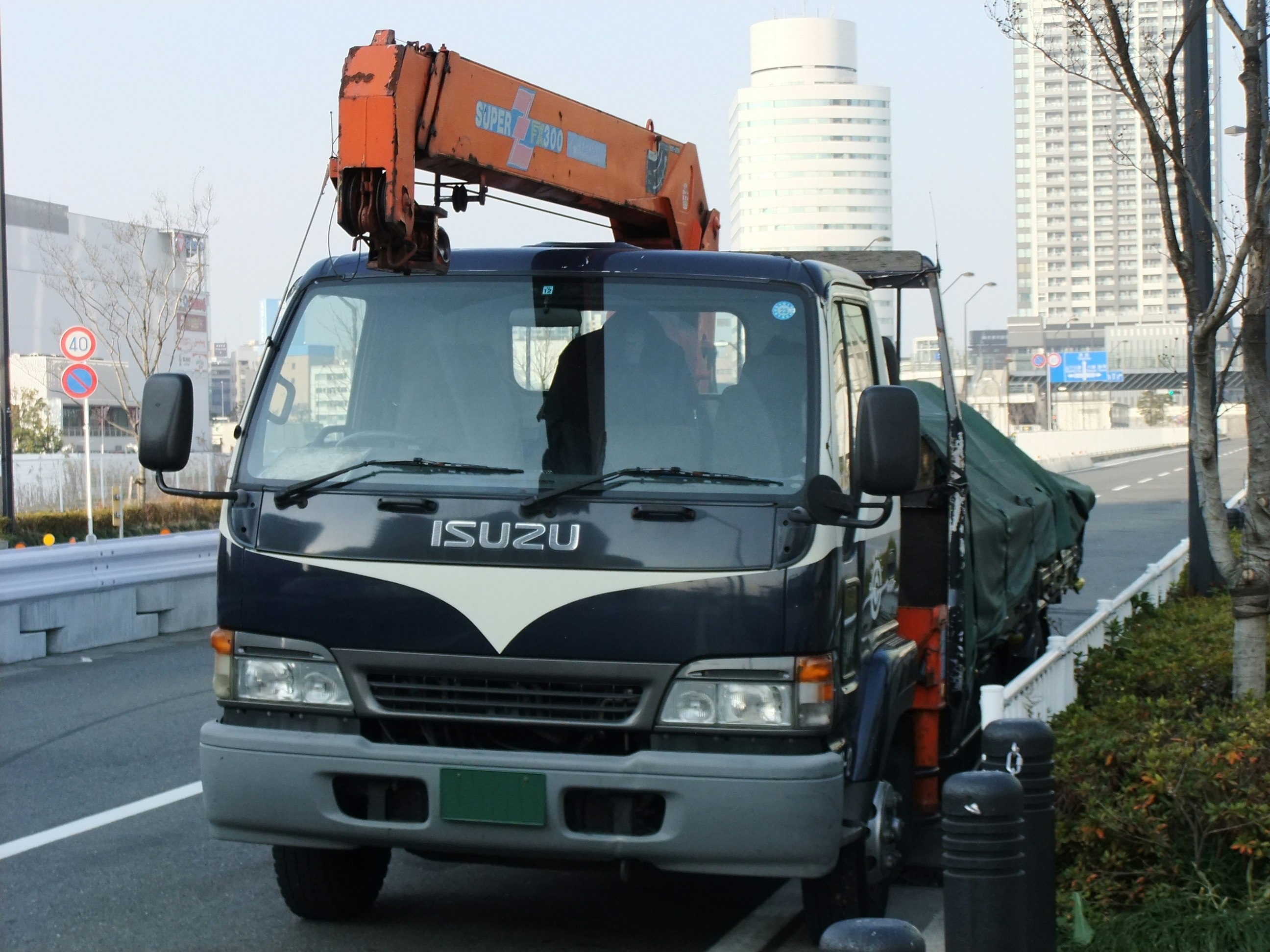
Second generation (Pre-facelift)

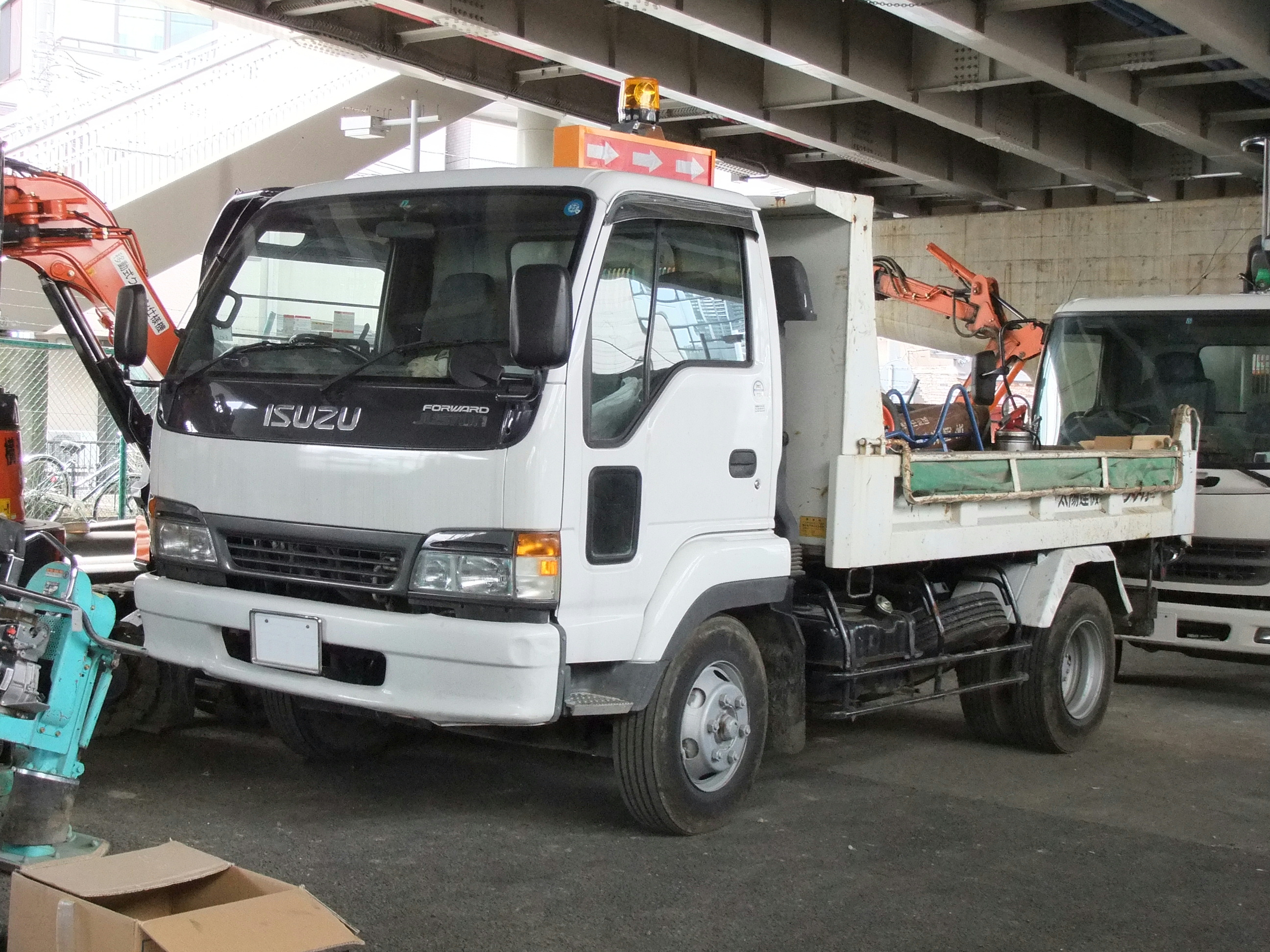
Second generation (Facelift)

The lighter duty version of the Forward was offered in 1986 as the replacement for the Forward S. It uses the cab from the Isuzu Elf and it has shorter length with less than 8 tons of GVW.

== Current lineup ==
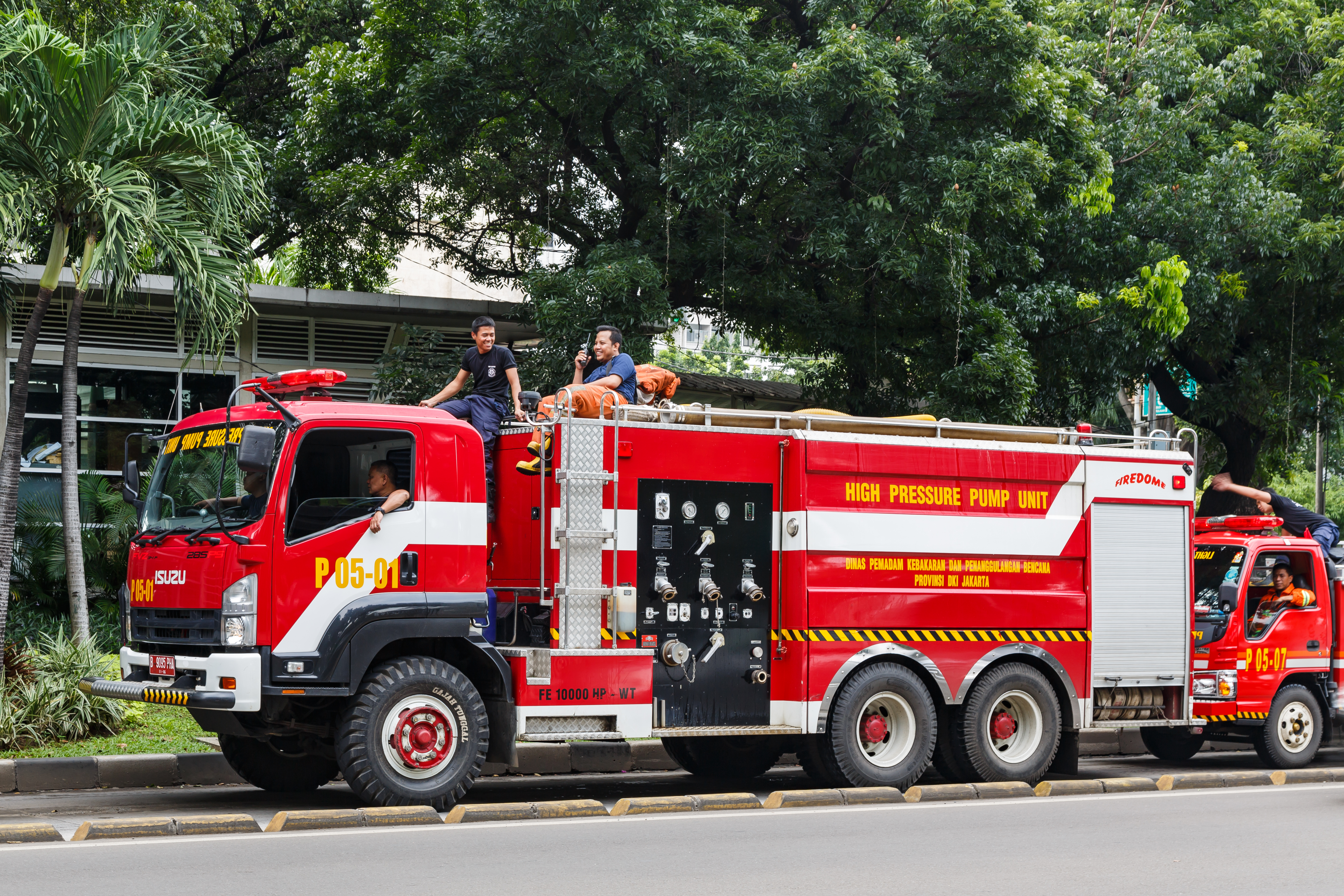
Isuzu FVZ 34P fire engine (Indonesia)

Japan/Worldwide

- FRR
- FSR
- FSA
- FTR
- FVR
- FVM
- FVZ
- FSS
- FTS
- GSR
- GVR

=== Australia ===
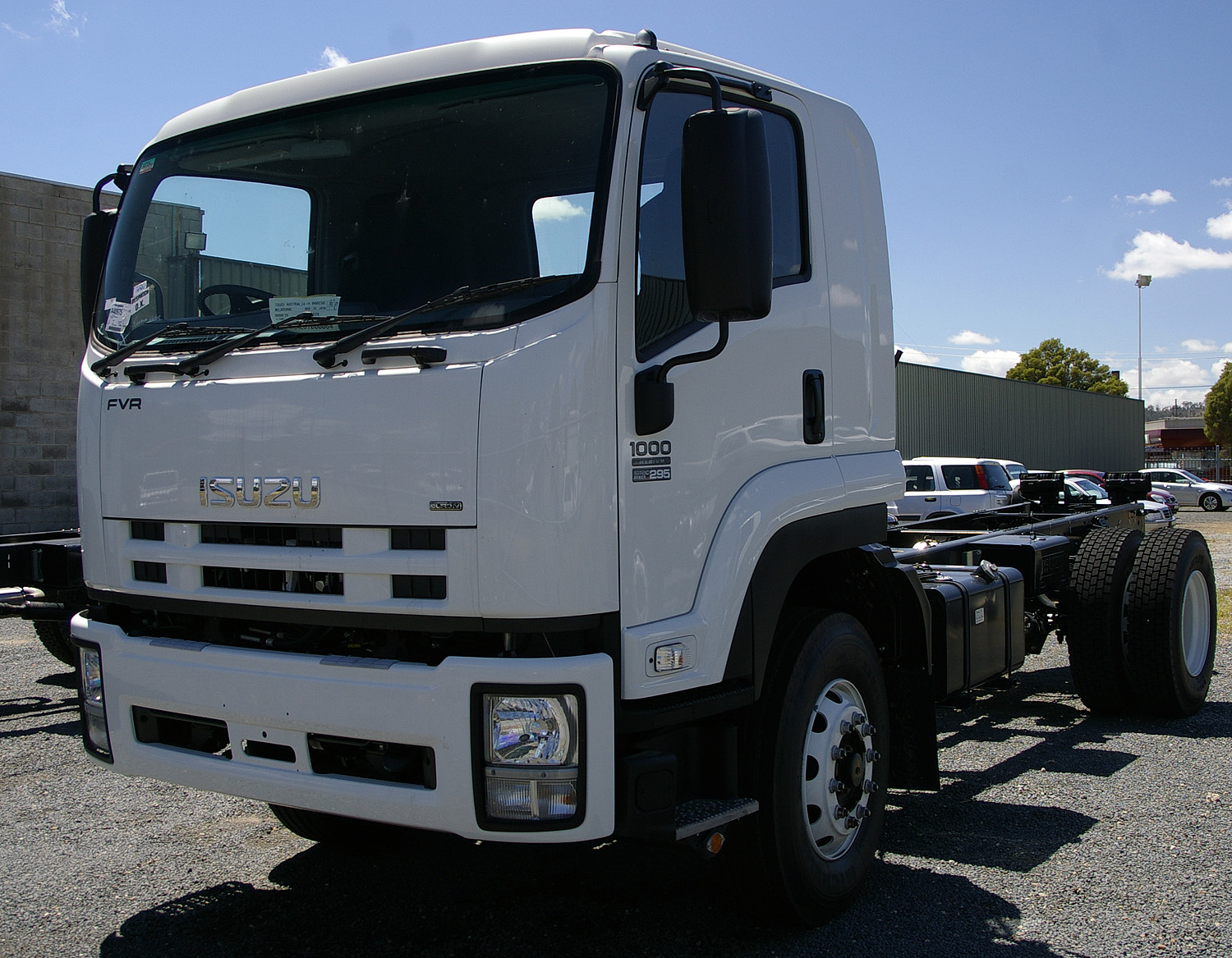
Isuzu FVR 1000 (Australia)

Isuzu is the market leader in Australia and makes models unique to that market. It includes Crew cabs of popular models with options like 4X4 and PTO. Australia also receives slightly larger versions codenamed FX-series.

- FRD
- FSR
- FSD
- FTR
- FVR
- FVD
- FVM
- FVL
- FVZ
- GVD
- FSS
- FTS
- FXR
- FXD
- FXZ
- FXY
- FXL
- GXD

=== North America ===
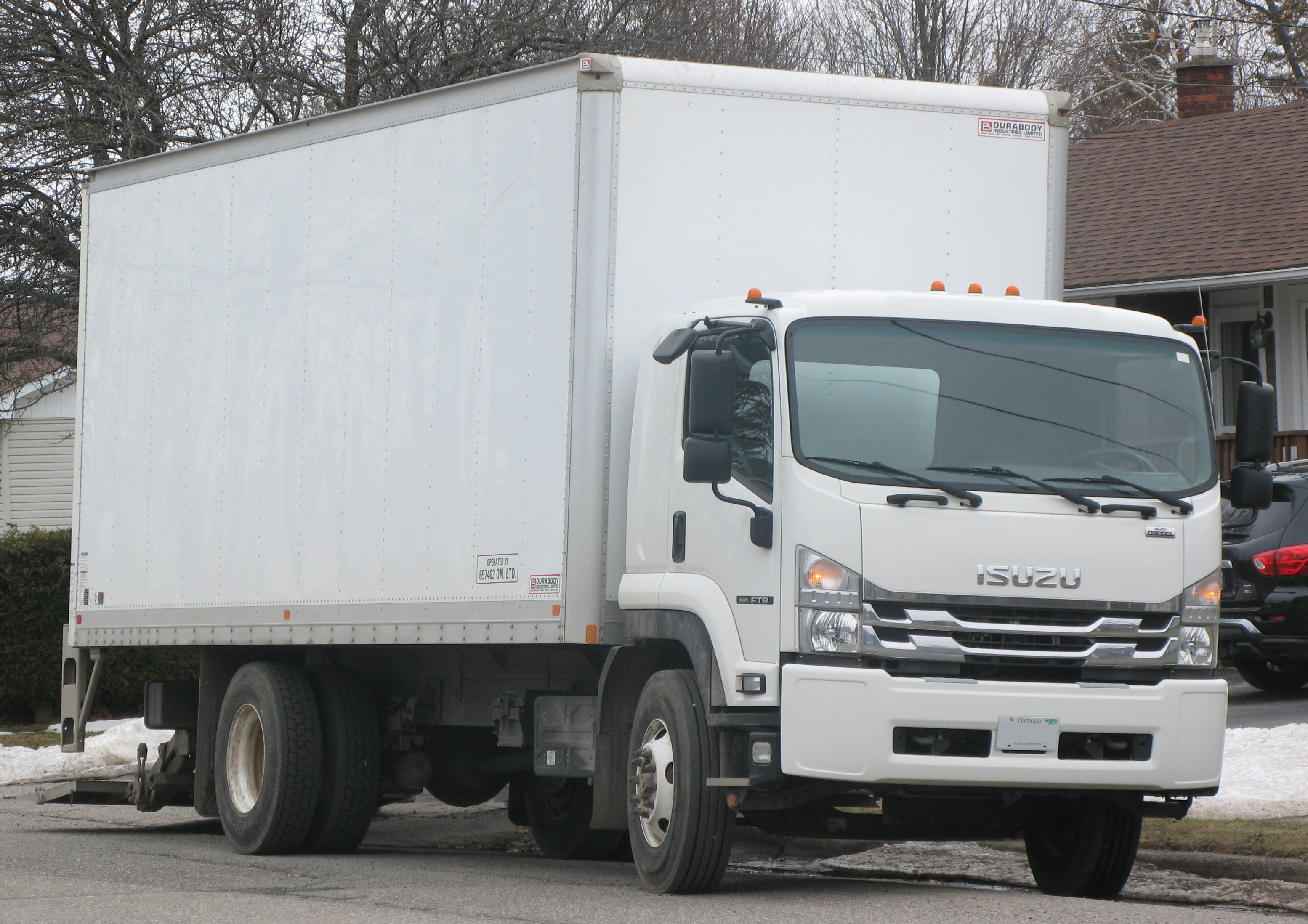
2018 Isuzu FTR in Ontario, Canada

The fifth generation class-6 FTR launched in the United States and Canada in 2017. It featured the Isuzu 5.2L 4HK1-TC engine developing 215hp and 520 lb-ft of torque paired to an Allison 2000 series 6-speed automatic transmission. Wheelbases range from 152 to 248 inches accommodating truck body lengths from 14 to 30. A Chevrolet-badged variant was launched as the LCF 6500 XD; "LCF" stood for "Low Cab Forward".

In 2022 the class-7 FVR was launched in addition to the FTR. Both the FTR and FVR now use the Cummins B6.7 engine featuring 260hp and 660 lb-ft of torque. The FTR is paired with an Allison 2550 RDS transmission with parking pawl, while the FVR features an Allison 2500 RDS without parking pawl. The same year Chevrolet launched its class-7 variant as the LCF 7500 XD.

The Isuzu FTR won "Medium Duty Truck of the Year" for 2018.

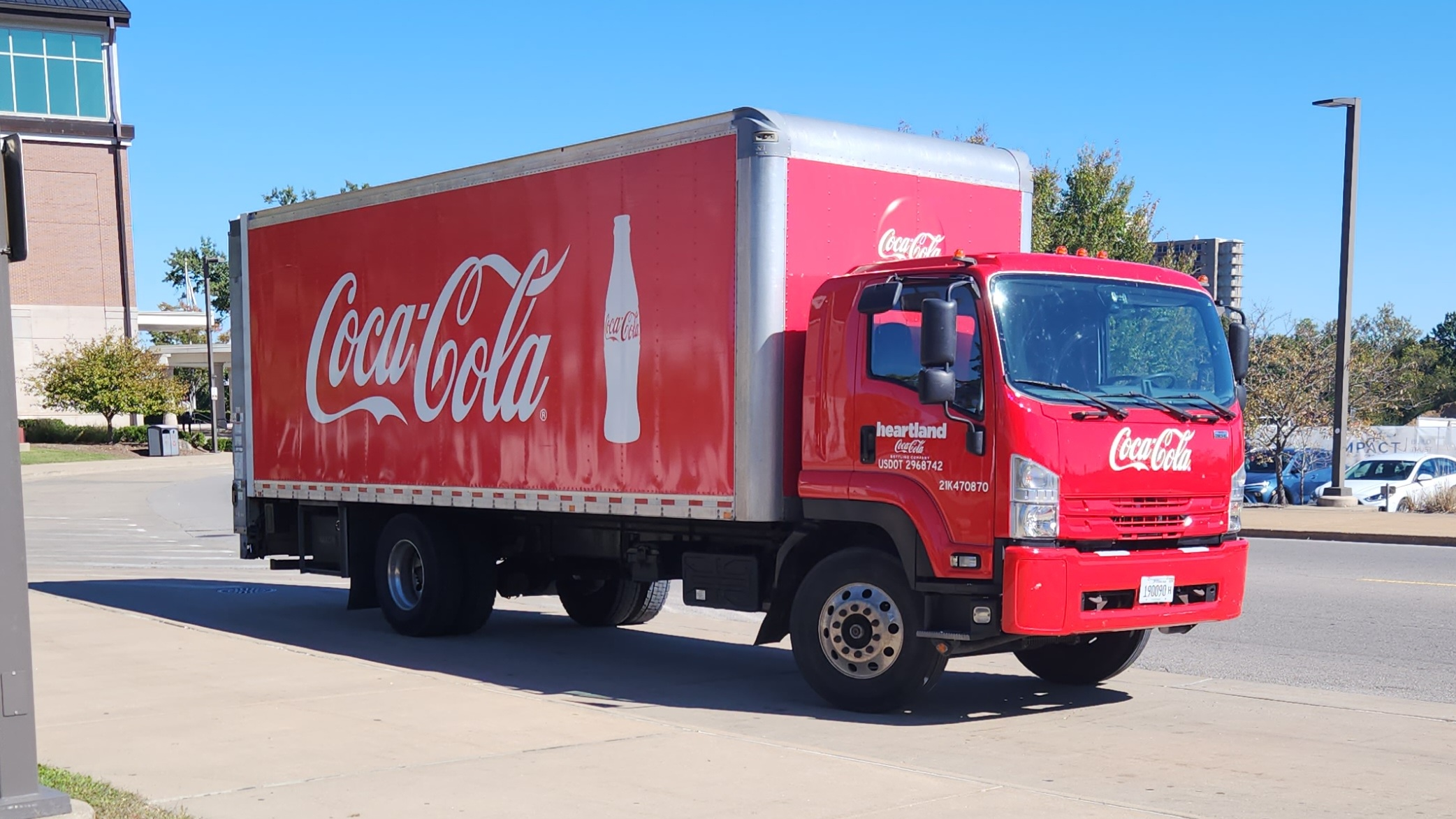
An Isuzu FTR seen in Carbondale, Illinois

== See also ==
- Isuzu
- Isuzu Giga
- Isuzu Elf/Chevrolet W-Series/GMC W-Series
