= Isuzu Vietnam =

Vietnam manufacturer of commercial vehicles and motor vehicle dealer

- Company type: Co. Ltd
- Founded: October 19, 1995; 29 years ago
- Headquarters: Ho Chi Minh City, Vietnam
- Key people: Kazuo Goda (General Director)
- Website: Official Website of Isuzu Vietnam Co., Ltd.

Isuzu Vietnam Co. (IVC) is a manufacturer of commercial vehicles and motor vehicle dealer based in Ho Chi Minh City, Vietnam. The company was founded on October 19, 1995, with a capital of US$15 million as a joint venture. Partners are the Japanese company Isuzu and Itochu Shoji, each with a share of 35%. From Vietnam, other partners are Saigon Automobile Mechanical Corporation at 20% and the Govap Import-Export Company with 10%.

The campus covers an area of 70,000 m², of which 28,666 m² built. Since the opening of the plant will be here a year from 3,000 to 5,000 cars for the local market built. Since May 2010, the company has exported trucks to neighboring Laos to cater to the growing demands. The local dealer, the Champa Lao Co., Ltd. wants to distribute nine NQR75L trucks monthly. The commercial contract has a value of 370,000 U.S. dollars and to the in-plant expansion plan ahead. Currently, 400 employees work at Isuzu Vietnam. Management of the plant is subject to the CEO Kenji Matsuoka.

Production at Isuzu Vietnam began in the summer of 1996, with the Isuzu Mu, the Isuzu Wizard and the Isuzu Bighorn. The following year came the models Isuzu Elf and Isuzu Forward. Production/assembly originally used CKD - kits. Only in 2002, the Isuzu D-Max began production, rather than just assembly.

Current models of the IVC include additions to the revised D-Max and the new generation of the forward series of Isuzu Heavy Duty. The Isuzu Giga is also offered.

== Current models ==
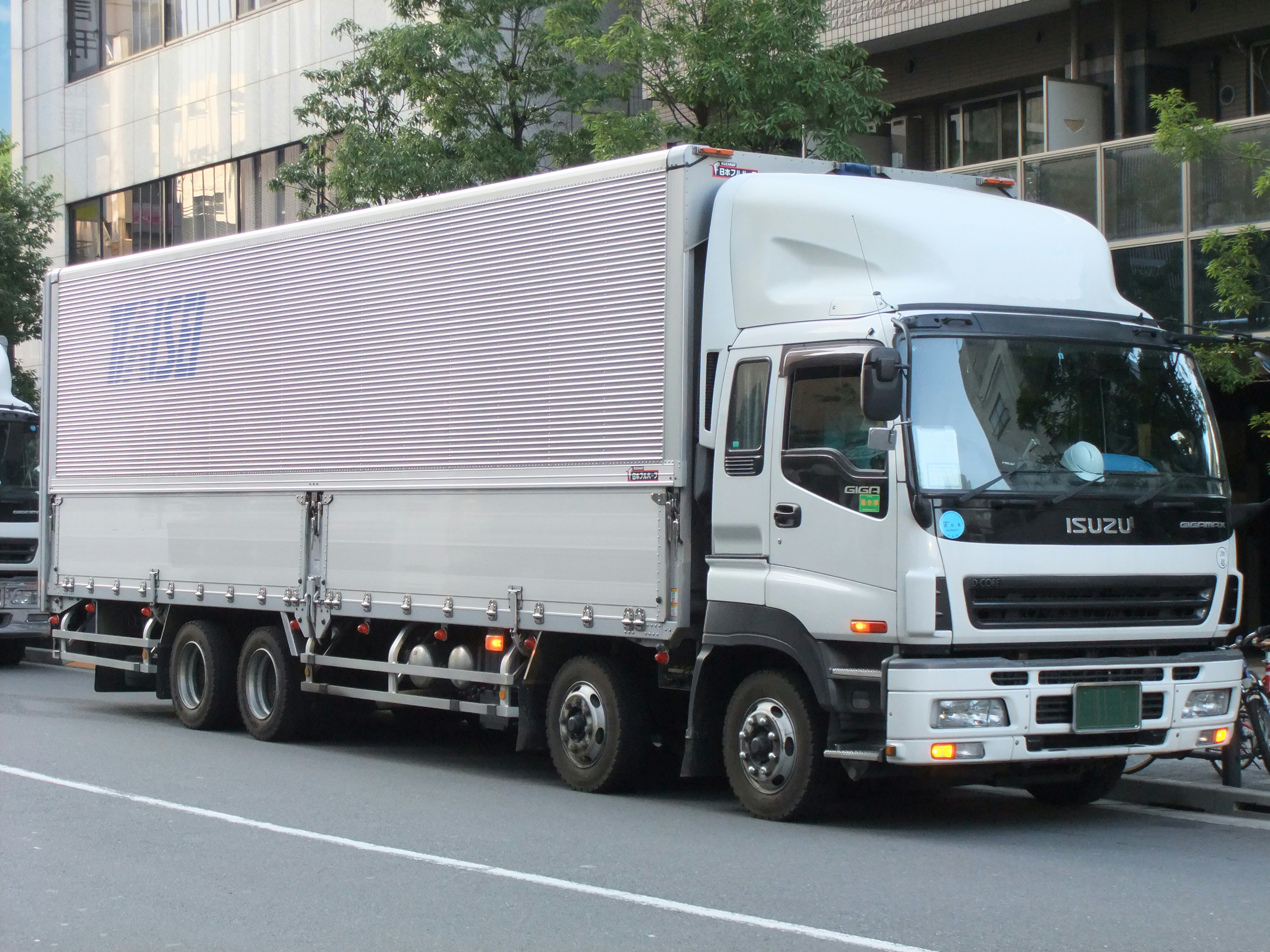
Isuzu Heavy Duty CYZ/EXR/EXZ
2007–present

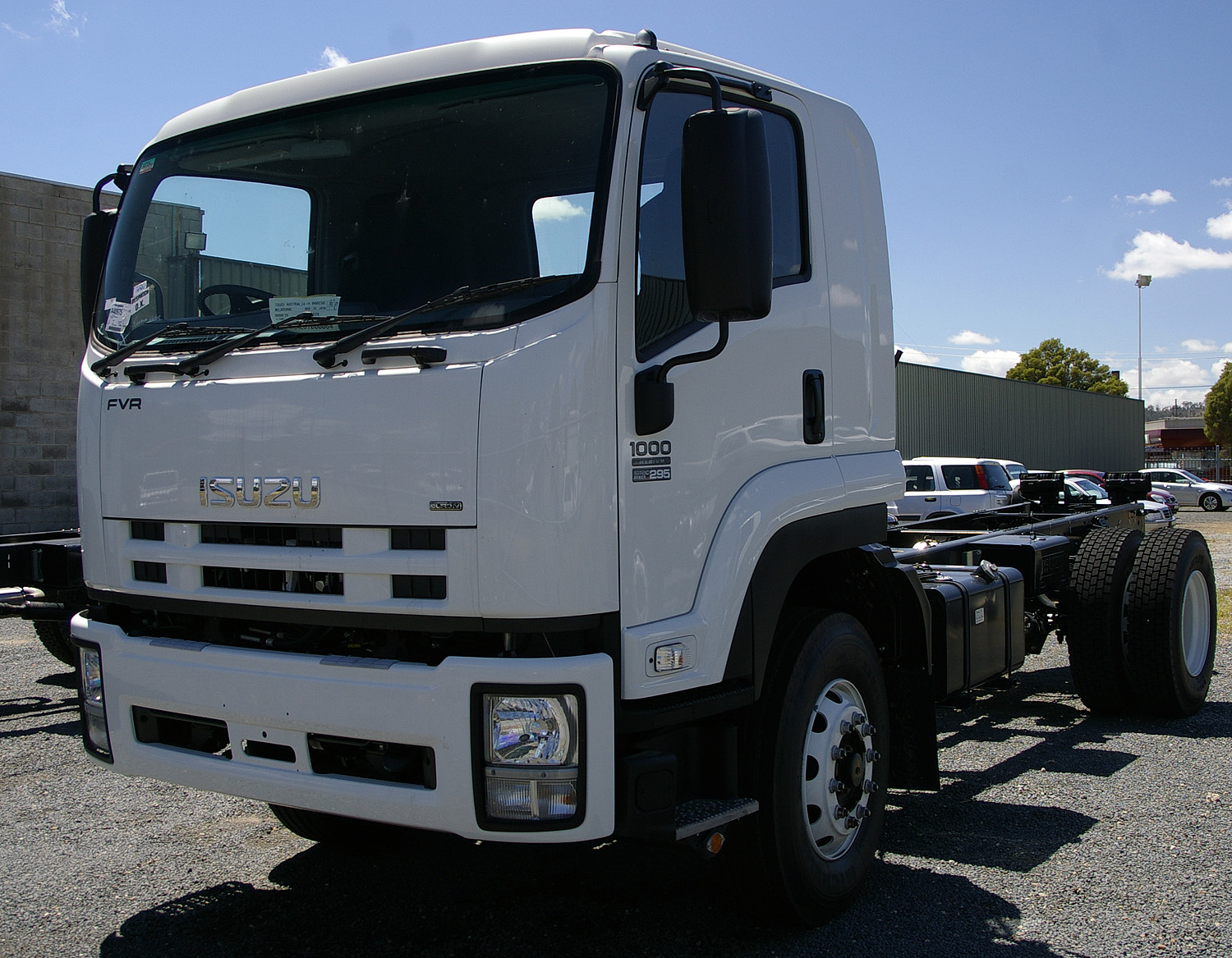
Isuzu Heavy Duty GVR/FVM/FVZ
2007–present

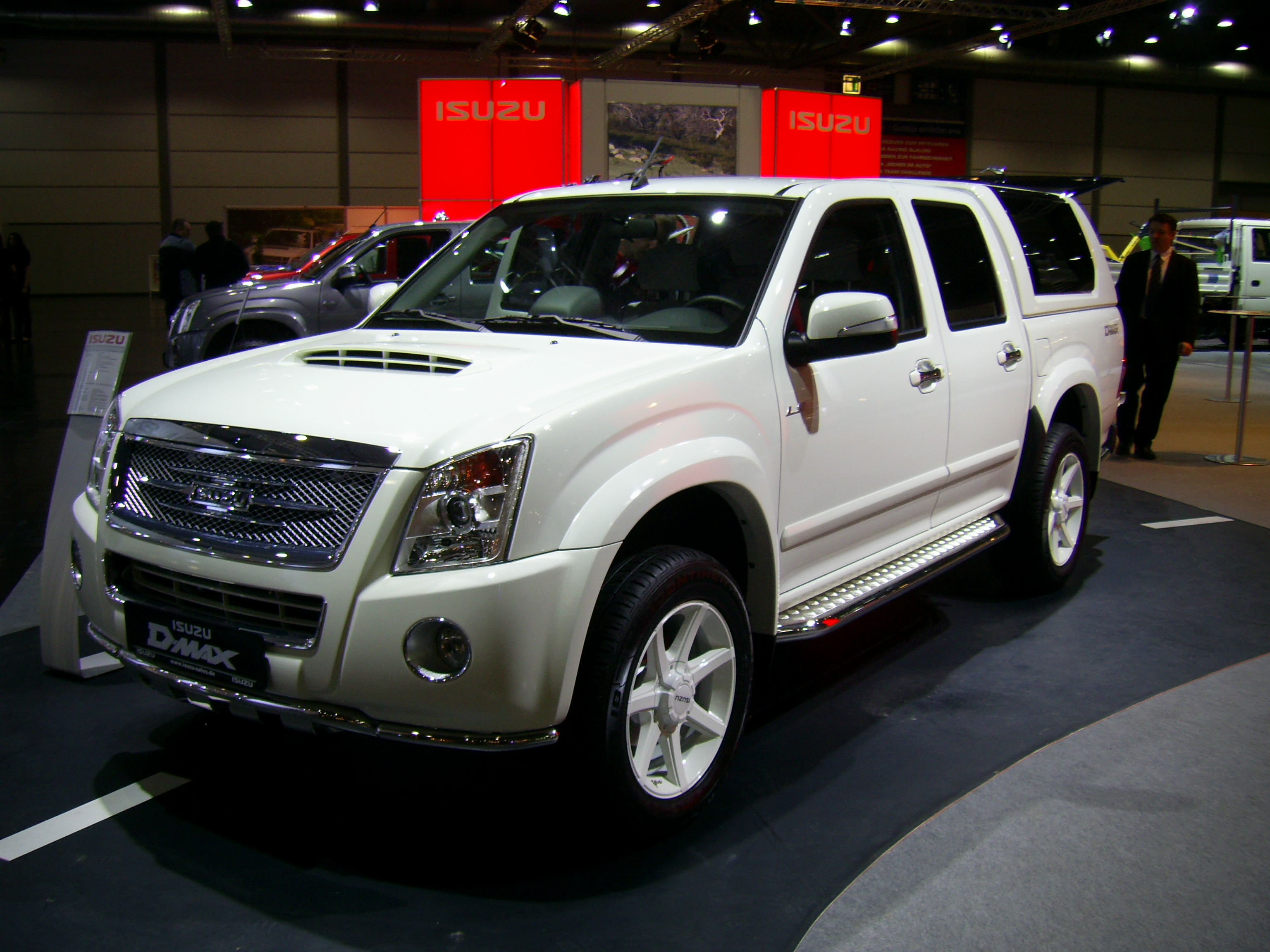
Isuzu D-Max
2008–present

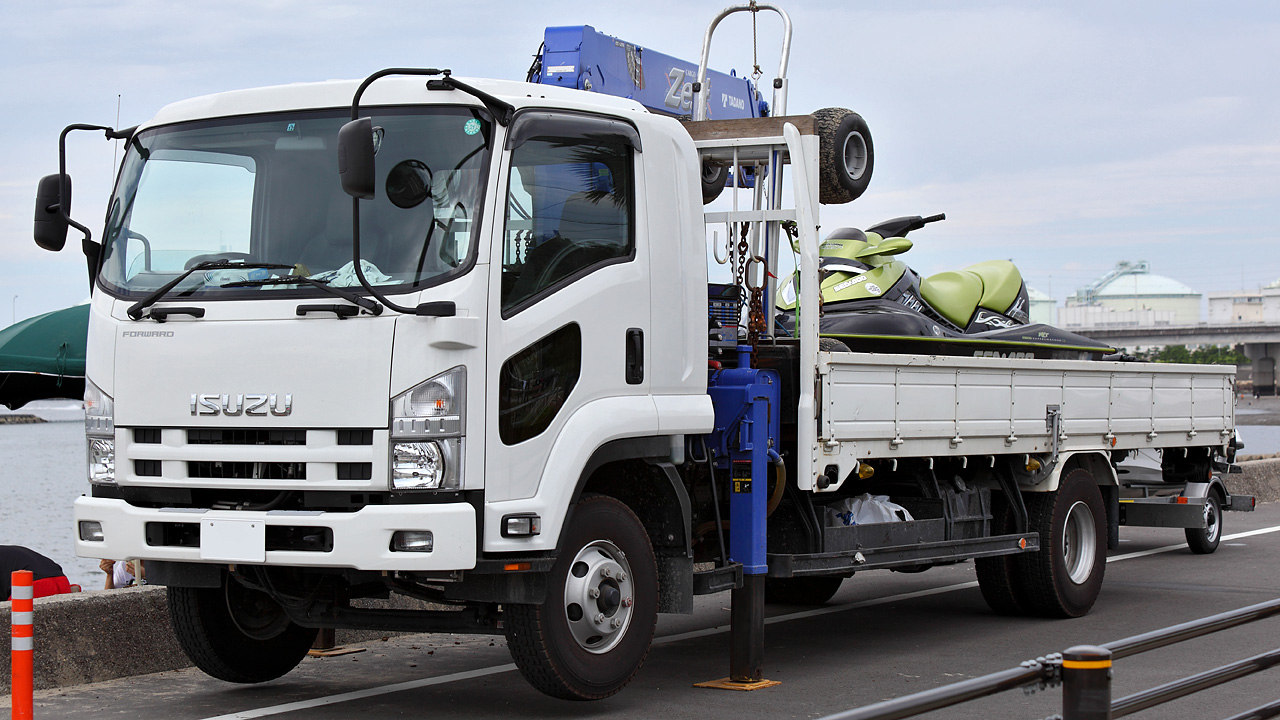
Isuzu Forward
2010–present

== Former models ==
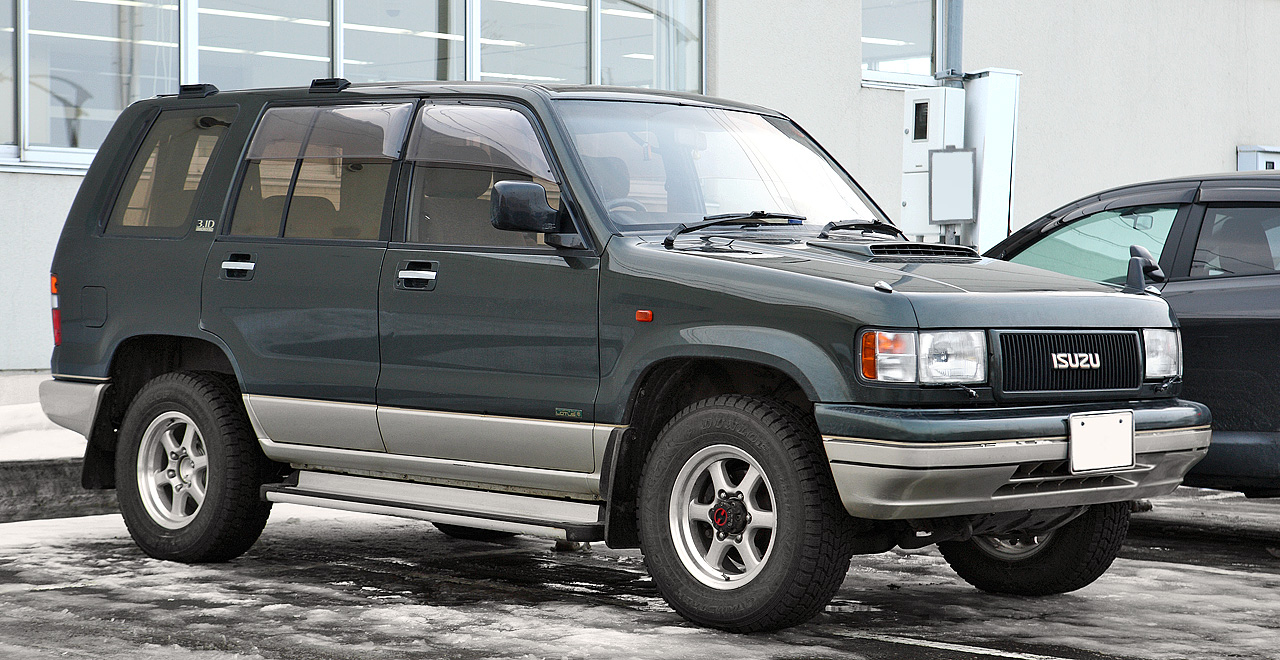
Isuzu Bighorn
1996 - 2005

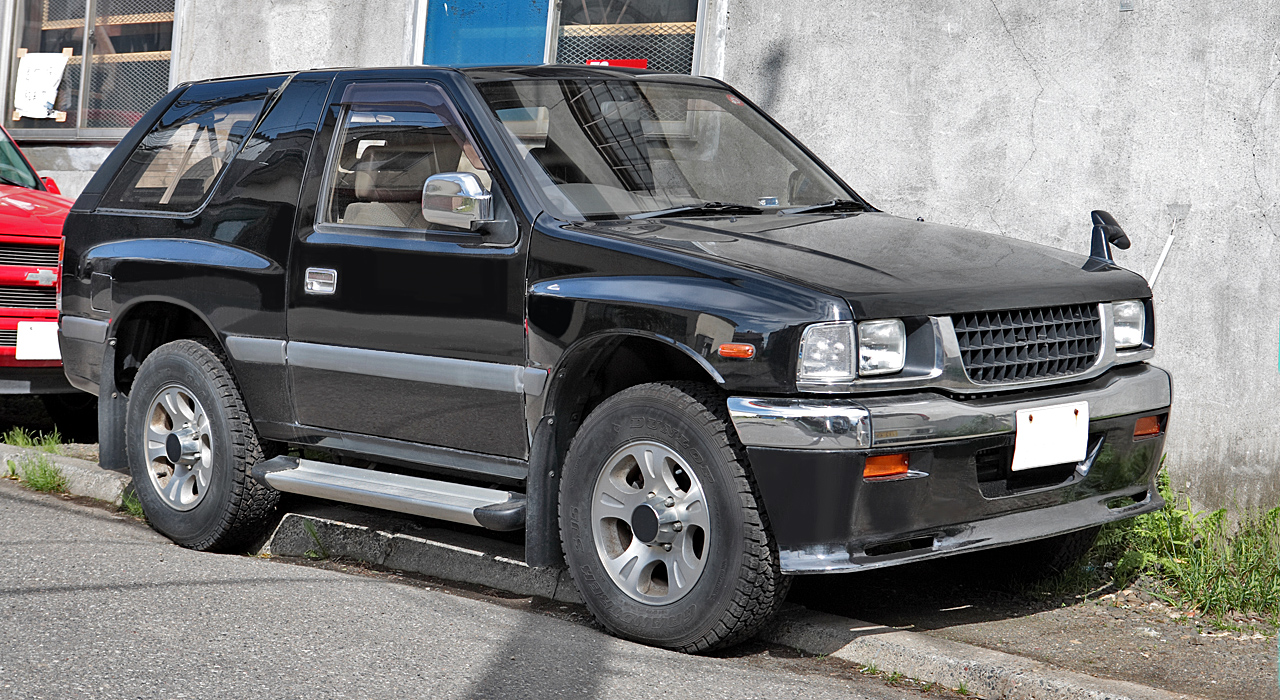
Isuzu Mu
1996 - 1998

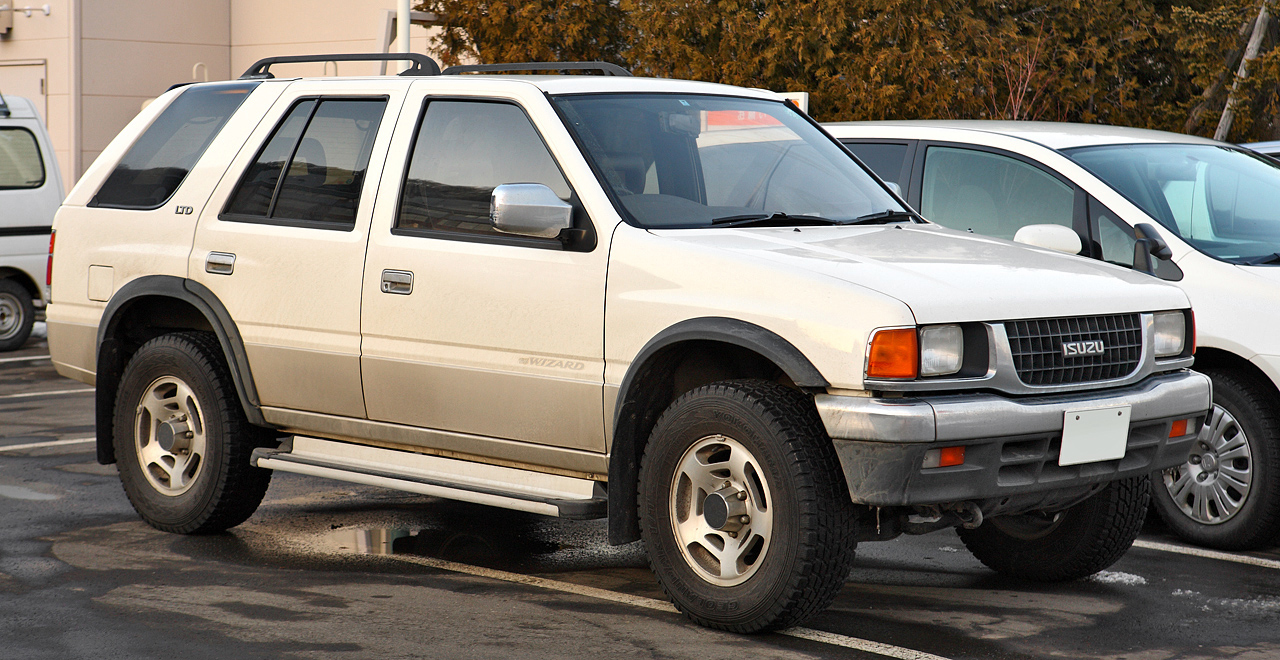
Isuzu Wizard
1996 - 1998

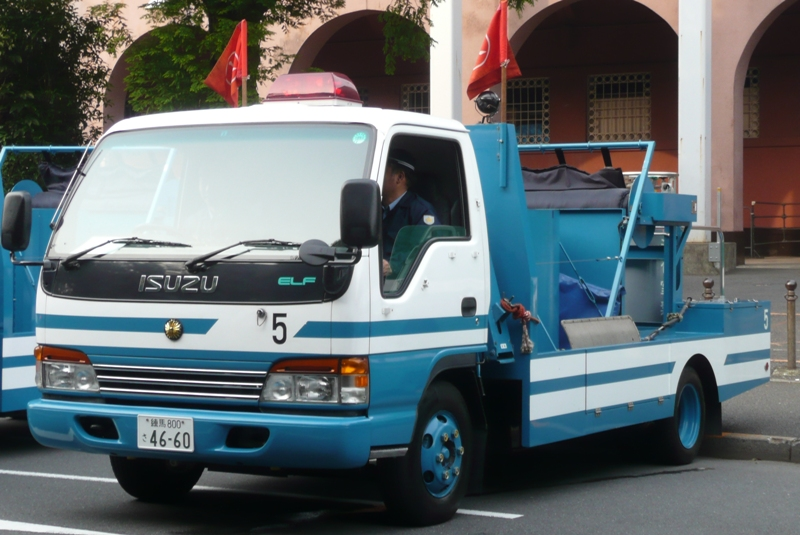
Isuzu Elf
1997 - 2003

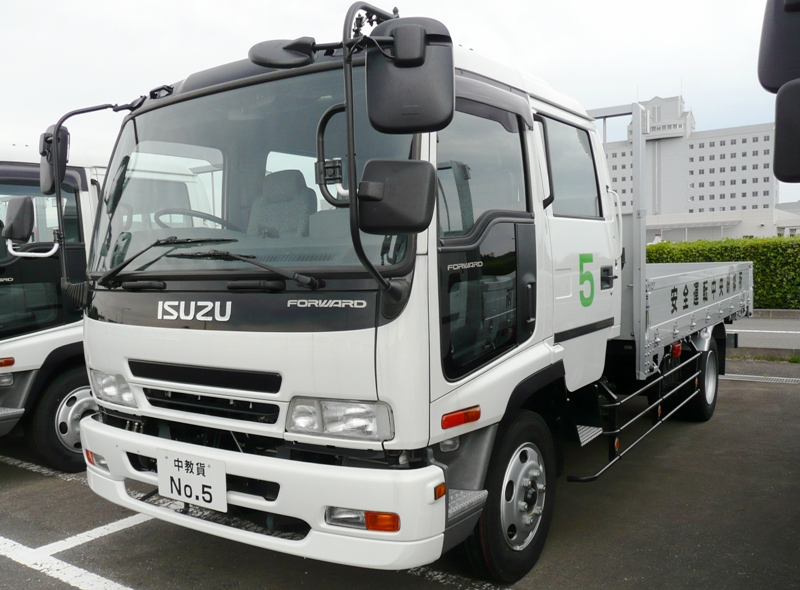
Isuzu Forward
1997 - 2010

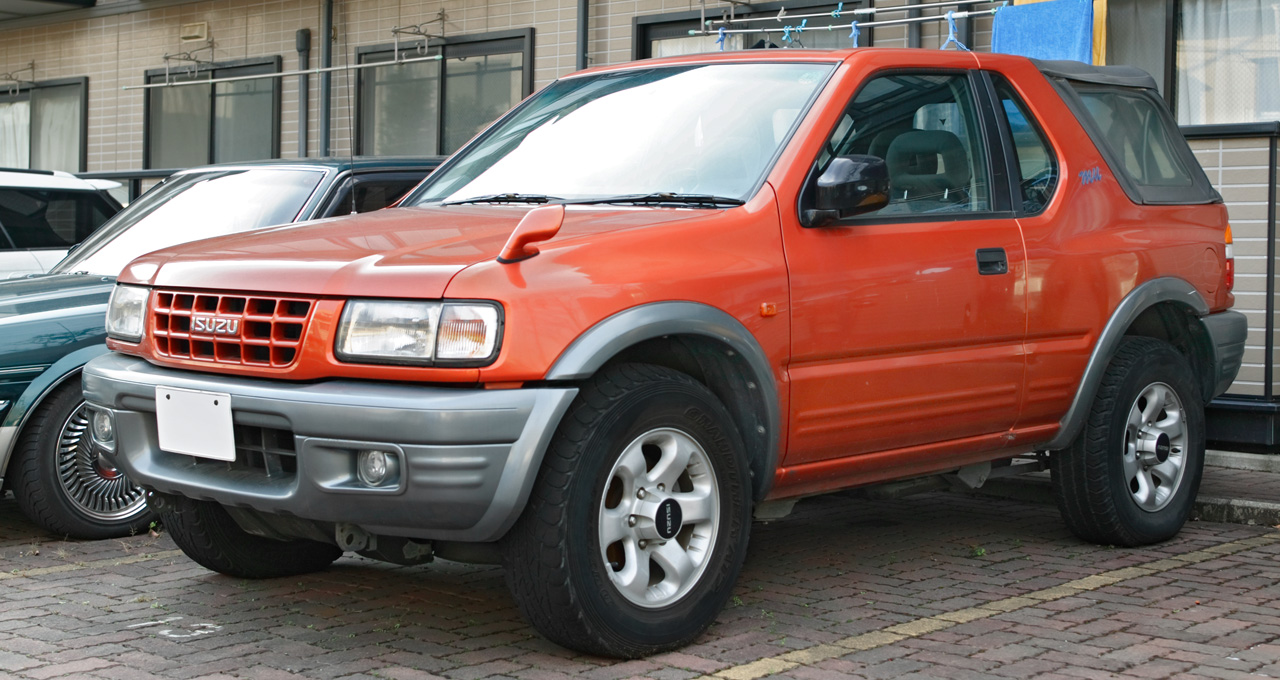
Isuzu Mu
1998 - 2004

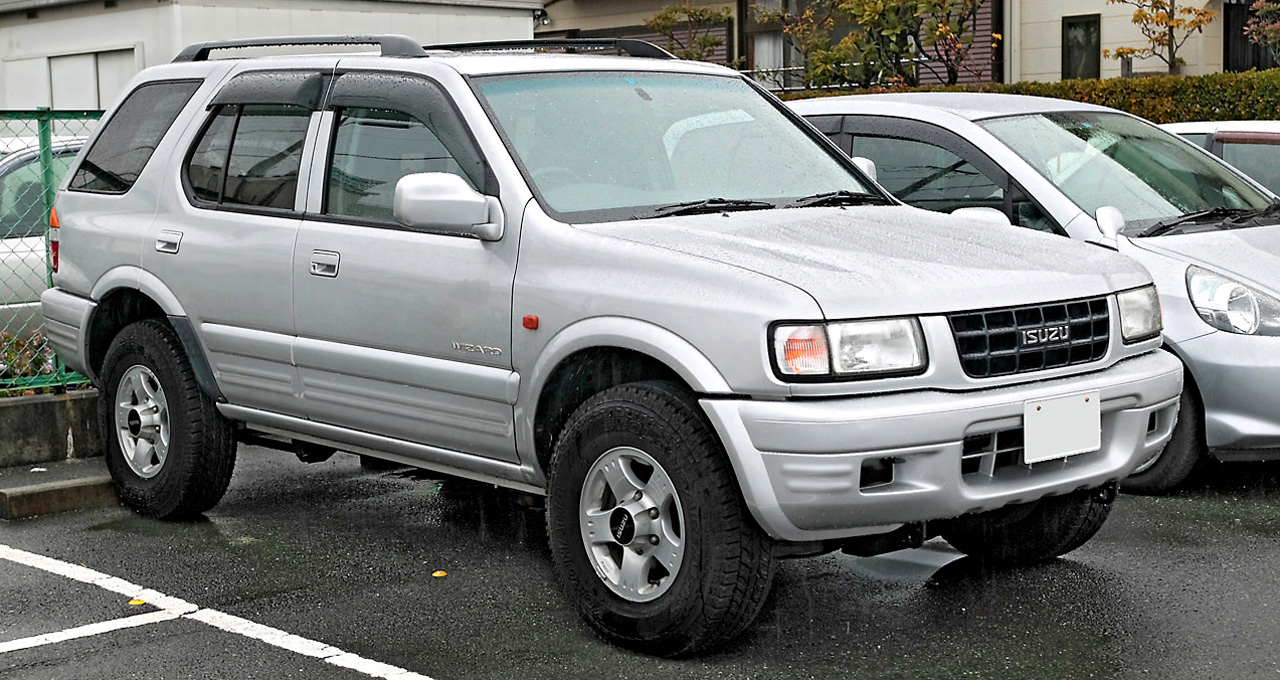
Isuzu Wizard
1998 - 2004

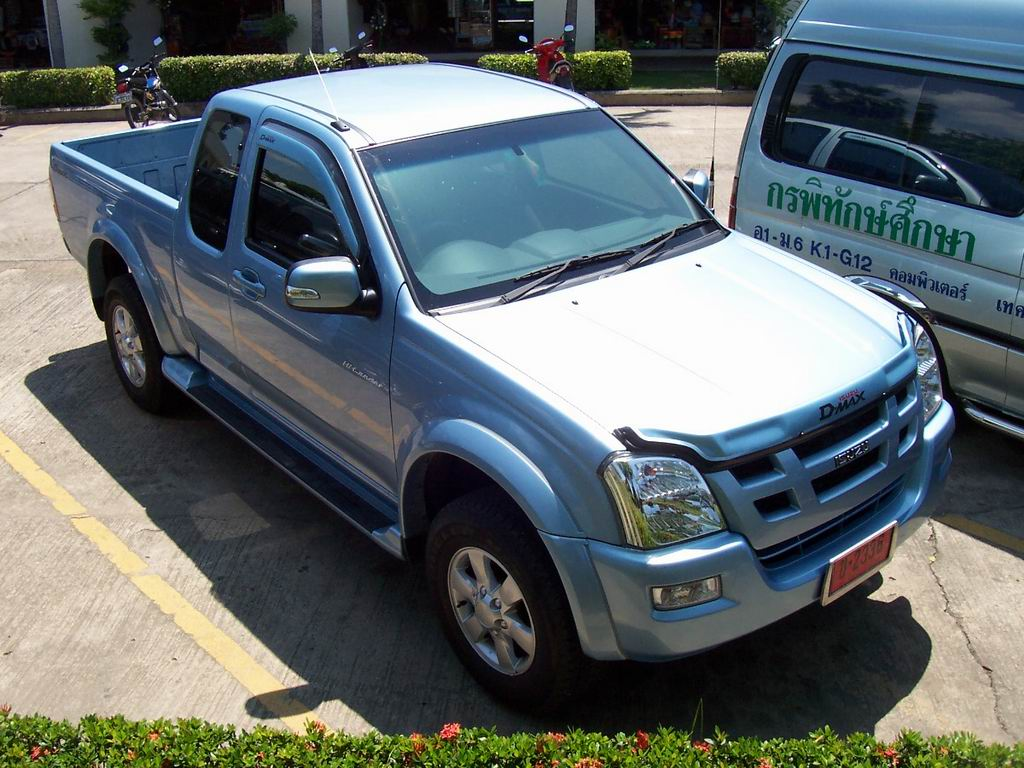
Isuzu D-Max
2002 - 2008

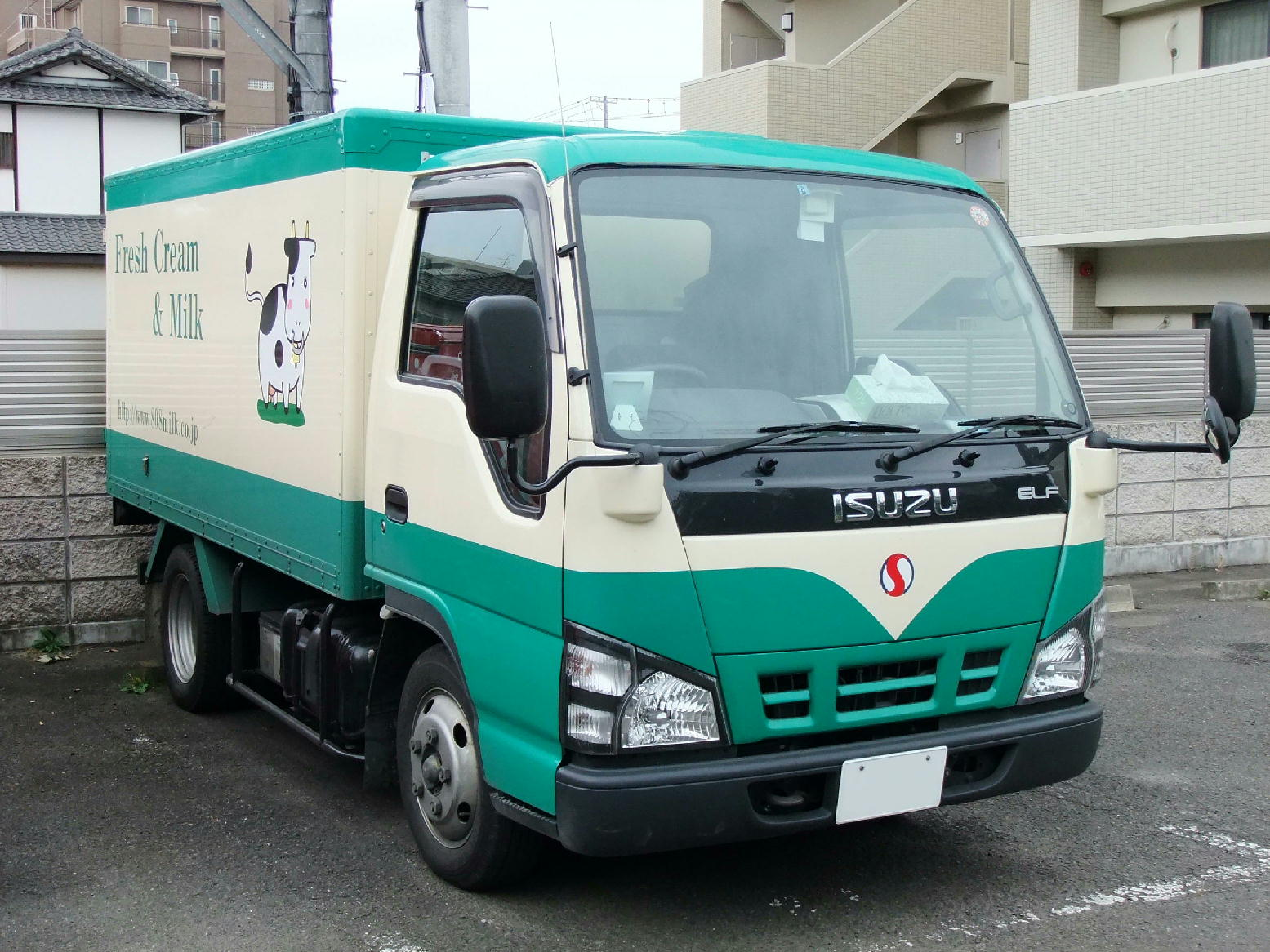
isuzu Elf
2003 - 2007

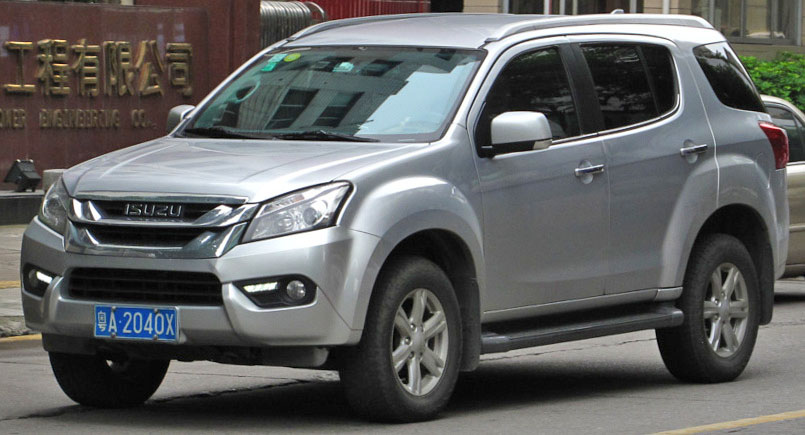
Isuzu Mu-X
2013 - present
