= Isuzu TX =

Truck manufactured by Isuzu

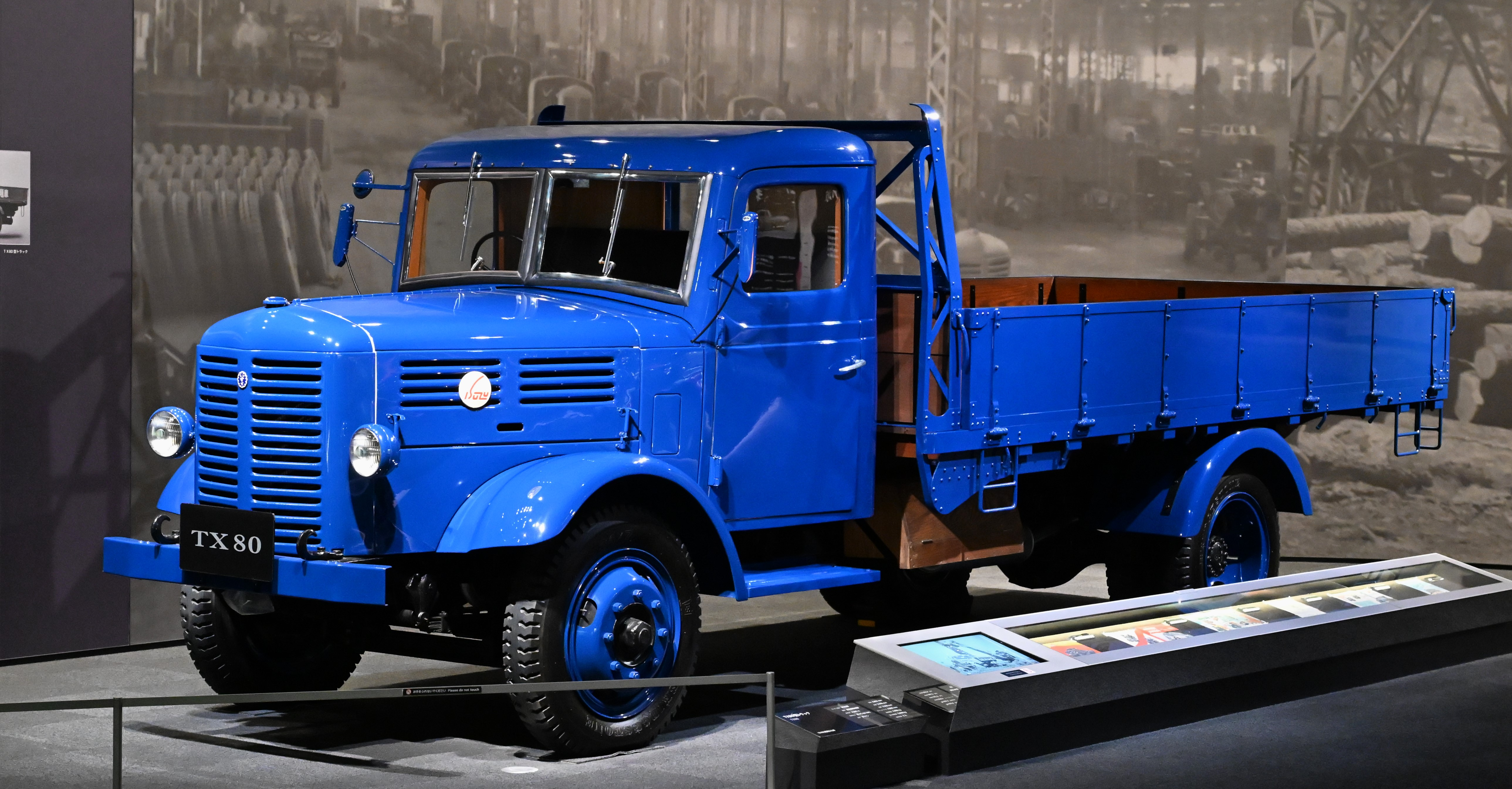
1948 Isuzu TX80 truck

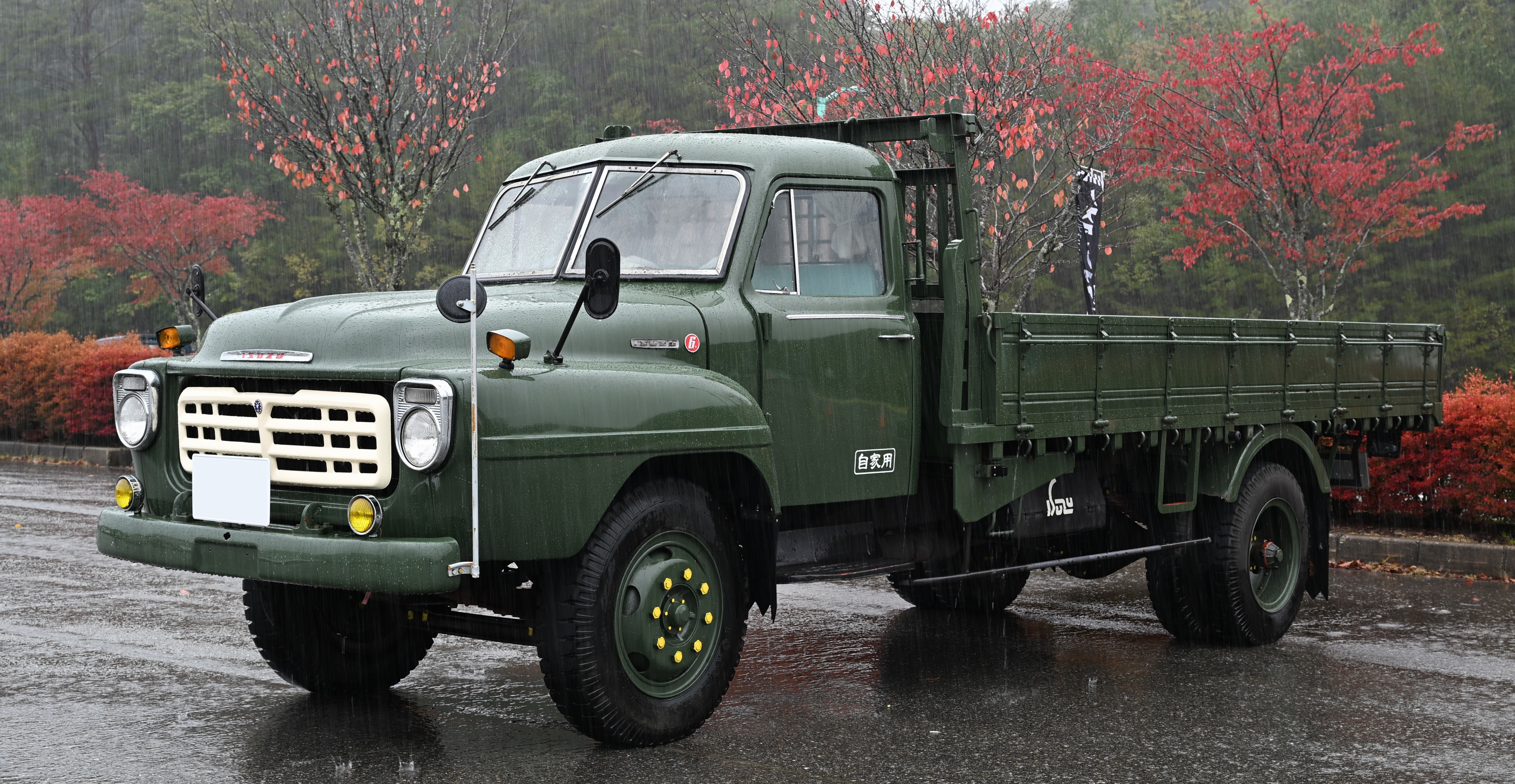
1962 Isuzu TX series

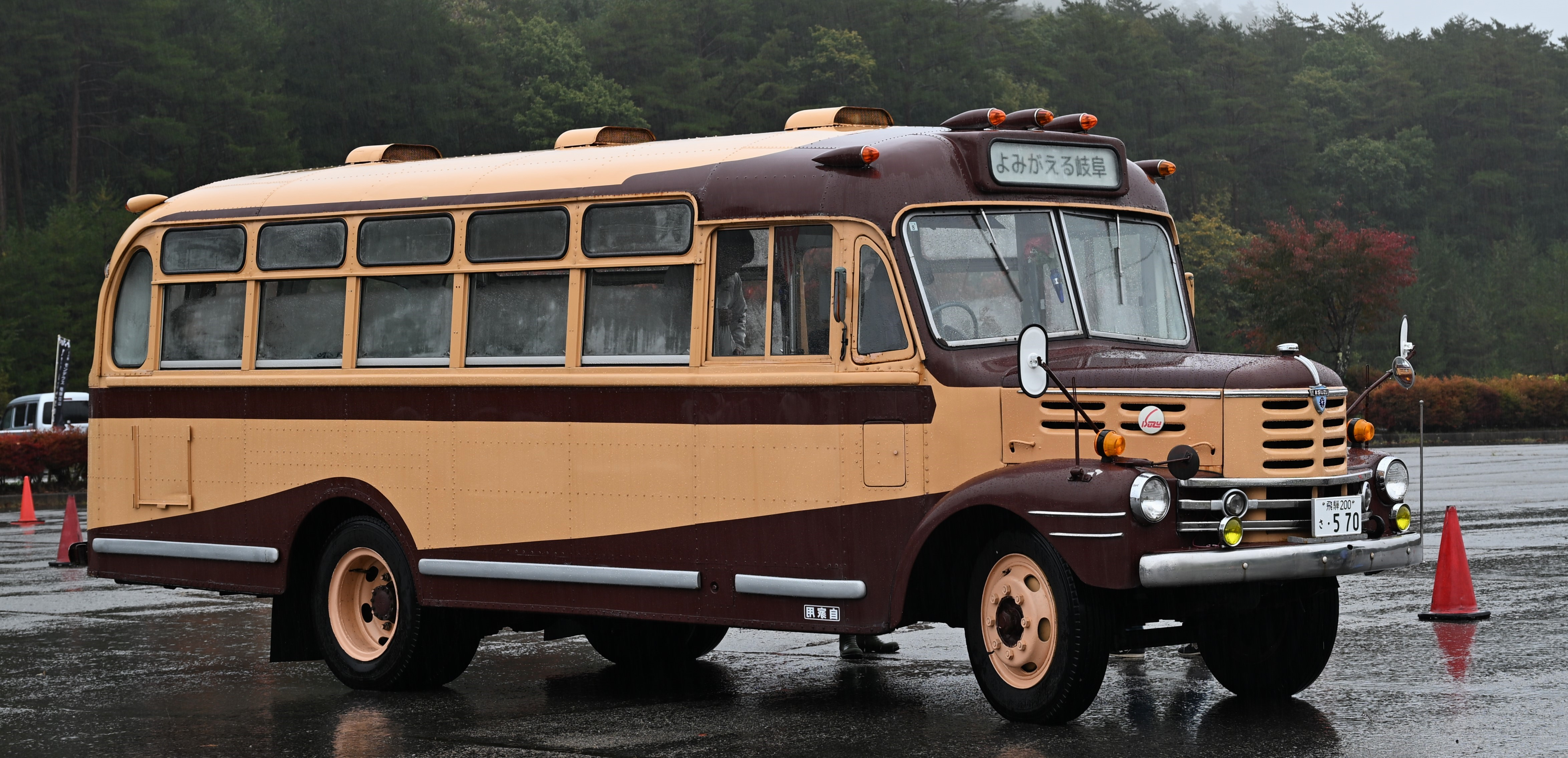
Isuzu BX bus

The Isuzu TX series truck was built from 1934 until the end of World War II; it then resumed production starting in 1946 and was built until 1979. TX trucks were powered either by gasoline or diesel engines. It was the company's first successful heavy duty truck used in various roles to include firetruck, tank truck, construction, dump truck, and cargo transport. It shared a chassis with the BX series bus, and evolved from the Isuzu Sumida bus that was produced starting in 1929. The TX series had several models based on engine size and payload requirements.

== History ==
The Japanese Military placed domestic truck production as vital to the defense of the country, after witnessing an influx of American products from GMC and Ford after the 1923 Great Kantō earthquake. Heavy duty vehicles manufactured by GMC were being imported by Japanese automotive importer Yanase Ltd., and Ford had built a manufacturing plant at Koyasu, Yokohama in 1925, while GM opened Osaka Assembly in 1927. In 1918, the Japanese Government passed the Military Vehicle Assistance Act, and after noticing an influx of imported trucks, Japanese manufacturers placed a high priority on domestically produced trucks, after noticing that 95% of all vehicles in Japan had been imported or locally manufactured by foreign built factories by 1930. During World War I, both Ford and GM devoted a large amount of their manufacturing capacity towards truck production to the war effort, and the Japanese military took notice.

The TX series was a development of earlier models, starting with the British built Wolseley CP 1.5-ton truck that used a 3.1-liter, four-cylinder gasoline engine producing 26 hp in 1924 that was manufactured in Japan under license by a predecessor of Isuzu, called Ishikawa Automotive Works Co. Ltd. Previously the company had previously built the Wolseley A9 passenger sedan, the first car manufactured in Japan in 1922. By 1927, Ishikawajima had learned enough to be able to cancel the tie-up with Wolseley, focusing on building trucks of their own design under the Sumida brand.

During WWII the Sumida M.2593 which was a modified version of the Wolseley Armoured Car and the Vickers Crossley Armoured Car that had been imported by the Imperial Japanese Navy for use in the invasion of China in 1931. These two vehicles were used as a basis for the later Sumida M.2593. In 1931, the Domestic Automobile Industry Establishment Investigation Committee was established and the three major manufacturers came together to contribute to a military sanctioned standard heavy duty truck. The Ministry of Railways under the direction of Hideo Shima designed the chassis, the exterior body and the interior driving position, Ishikawajima (Isuzu) designed the engine, DAT Automobile Manufacturing Inc. designed the transmission, and Tokyo Gas & Electrical Industry Co. Ltd. designed the axles and drive train.

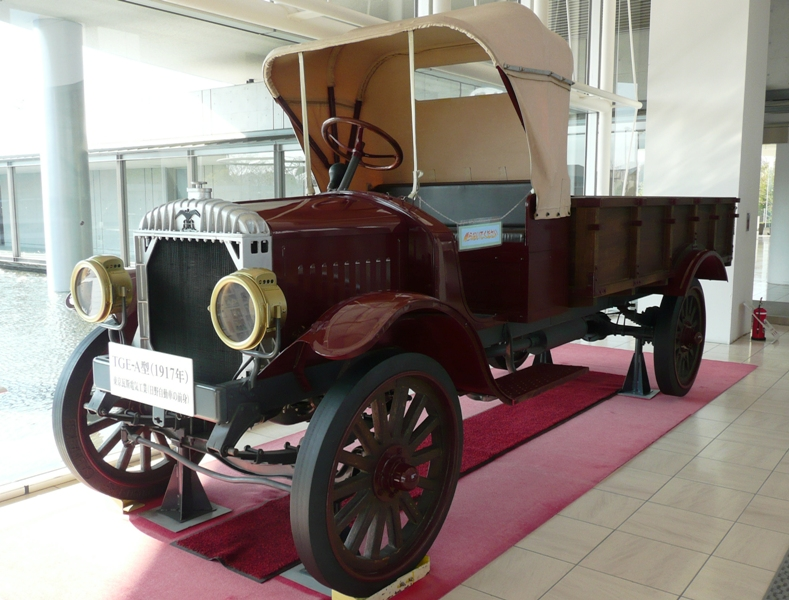
TGE-A truck

Similar efforts were also occurring at Tokyo Gas and Electric Industries, a predecessor of Hino with the Model TGE "A-Type" truck in 1917, and Nihon Diesel Industries, Ltd, a predecessor of Nissan Diesel had developed the LD1 truck in 1939, and there was also the Toyota G1.

== TX Series ==
The TX was offered in 1933 by Kyodo Domestic Automobile Co., Ltd. from the combined efforts of Automobile Industry Co., Ltd. and Tokyo Gas Electric Engineering Co., Ltd. in two load bearing platforms and engines offered, the TX35 and the TX40. It was shared with the Sumida Bus BX35/40/45. The TX35 had a 1.5 ton payload and the TX40 had a 2.0 ton payload and off-road capability. The engine was a flathead 6-cylinder 4.4L gasoline engine called the GA40. The transmission was a dry clutch with a 4 speed transmission. The dimensions were Overall length 6.64m / wheelbase 4m / overall width 2.19m / overall height 2.11m. The BX series bus was BX35 was 15-20 passengers, the BX40 was 20-30 and the BX45 was 25-35 passengers. In 1934, the first Japanese built military grade TU series was introduced with 3 axles and an overall length of 5.4m and a diesel engine installed, where it was known as the Type 97 along with the Type 94 tankette.

As production resumed after the war, it competed with the Toyota FA, Mitsubishi Fuso, and the Nissan Diesel. The early post-war models included the gasoline-powered TX80 and the diesel TX61. The 5-ton TX80 had a 4,390 cc (4.4 L) GD32 engine producing 90 PS (66 kW) at 2,800 rpm, while the diesel DA45 engine displaced 5,103 cc (5.1 L). The TX61 produces 85 PS (63 kW) and has a six-ton payload.

== See also ==
- Automotive industry in Japan
- List of military trucks
