= Isuzu 6H engine =

Isuzu 6H Engine
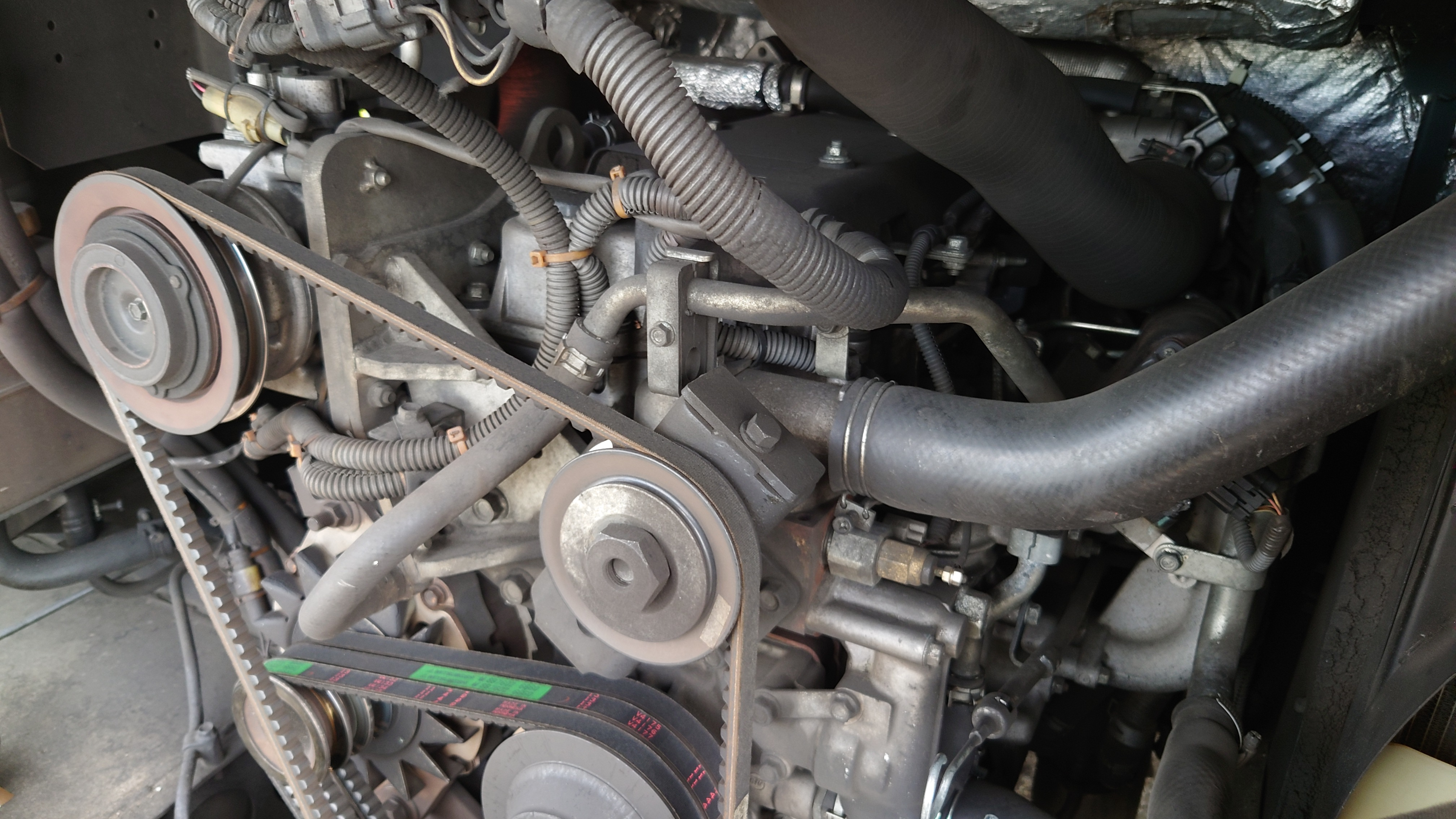
- Isuzu 6HK1-TCN

Overview
- Manufacturer: Isuzu and General Motors

Layout
- Configuration: Inline six-cylinder
- Displacement: 7.1–8.2 L; 434.9–502.0 cu in (7,127–8,226 cc)
- Cylinder bore: 115 mm (4.53 in)
- Piston stroke: 125 mm (4.92 in)
- Cylinder block material: Cast iron
- Cylinder head material: Cast iron
- Valvetrain: SOHC 4 valves × cyl.
- Compression ratio: 17.5:1, 17.0:1 for 300 hp (224 kW)

Combustion
- Turbocharger: With intercooler
- Fuel system: Injection pump (for 6HH1) High-pressure common-rail direct injection
- Fuel type: Diesel
- Cooling system: Water-cooled

Output
- Power output: 165–300 PS (121–221 kW)
- Torque output: 520–860 lb⋅ft (705–1,166 N⋅m)

The Isuzu 6H is a family of inline six-cylinder diesel engines installed in Isuzu medium-duty trucks, and also installed in GM medium-duty trucks as the Duramax LG4. It is mated to the Allison 2500, 3000, and 3500 series transmissions.

== Engine specifications ==
6HK1/Duramax LG4

- Displacement: 7.8 L; 475.4 cu in (7,790 cc)
- Bore and stroke: 115 mm × 125 mm (4.53 in × 4.92 in)
- Block: gray iron
- Cylinder head: cast iron
- Fuel cutoff: 2400 rpm
- Aspiration: Turbocharged and intercooled
- Valvetrain: SOHC 24-valve
- Compression: 17.5:1 (17.0:1 for 300 hp (224 kW))
- Injection: high-pressure common-rail direct injection
- Power/torque: 200–300 hp (200–300 PS; 150–220 kW), 520–860 lb⋅ft (72–119 kg⋅m)

6HH1

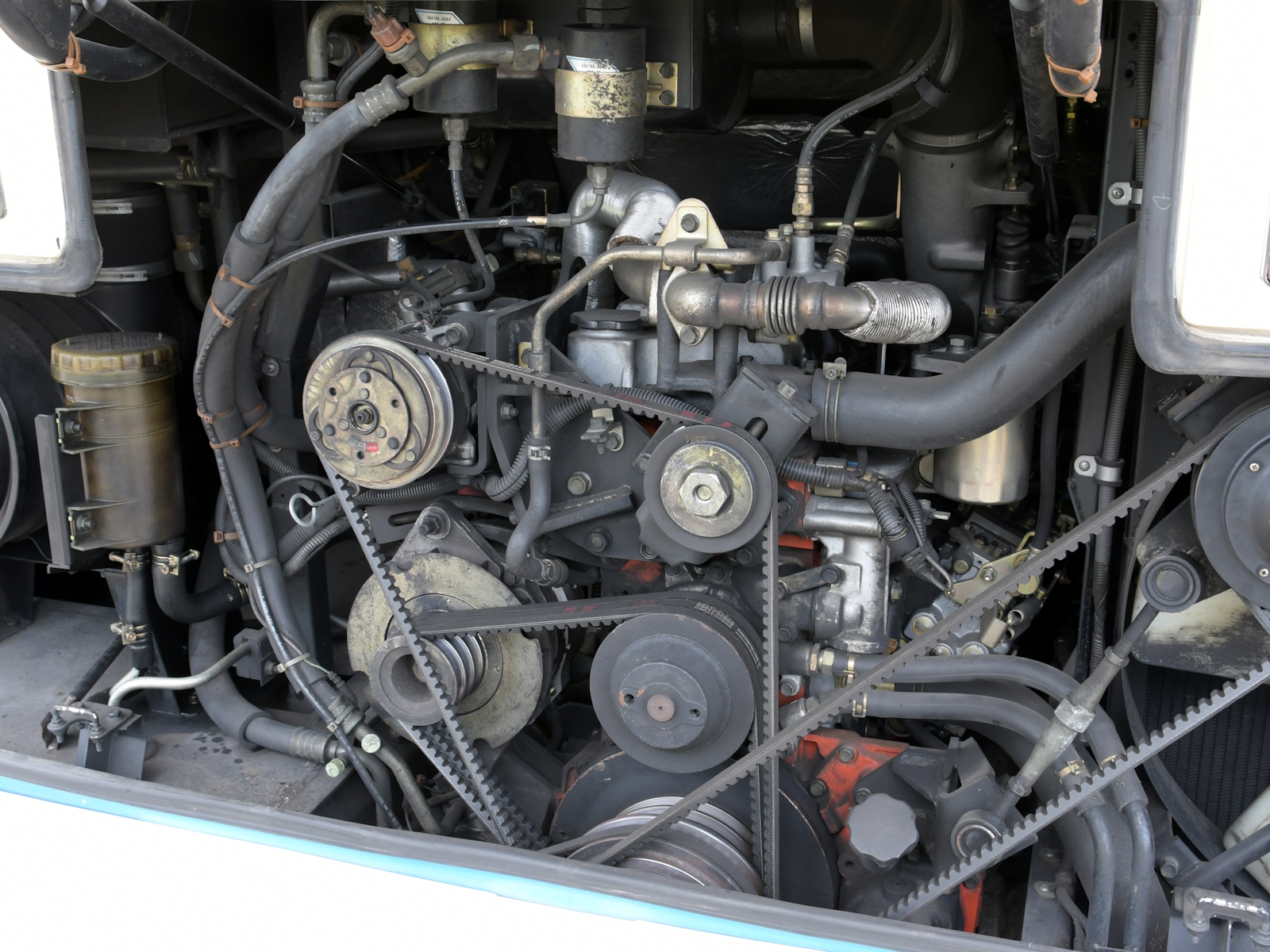
Isuzu 6HH1-S

- Displacement: 8.2 L; 502.0 cu in (8,226 cc)
- Bore and stroke: 115 mm × 132 mm (4.5 in × 5.2 in)
- Aspiration: Naturally aspirated
- Valvetrain: SOHC 24-valve
- Compression ratio: 18.5:1
- Injection: Reformed Bosch, inline injection pump with automatic timer, and all-speed mechanical governor
- Power/torque: 173–200 hp (175–203 PS; 129–149 kW), 340–370 lb⋅ft (47–51 kg⋅m)

6HE1

- Displacement: 7.1 L; 434.9 cu in (7,127 cc)
- Bore and stroke: 110 mm × 125 mm (4.3 in × 4.9 in)
- Aspiration: naturally aspirated or turbocharged
- Valvetrain: direct injection, SOHC 24-valve
- Compression ratio: 16.9:1
- Injection: direct injection
- Power/torque: 165–260 hp (167–264 PS; 123–194 kW), 330–560 lb⋅ft (46–77 kg⋅m)

== Engine variants ==
Model	Displacement	Output	Notes
6HE1-N	7.1 L; 434.9 cu in (7,127 cc)	175 PS (129 kW)	
6HE1-S	7.1 L; 434.9 cu in (7,127 cc)	195 PS (143 kW)	
6HE1-TCN	7.1 L; 434.9 cu in (7,127 cc)	220 PS (162 kW)	
6HE1-TCS	7.1 L; 434.9 cu in (7,127 cc)	250 PS (184 kW)	
6HH1-N	8.2 L; 502.0 cu in (8,226 cc)	175 PS (129 kW)	
6HH1-C	8.2 L; 502.0 cu in (8,226 cc)	185 PS (136 kW)	
6HH1-S	8.2 L; 502.0 cu in (8,226 cc)	210 PS (154 kW)	
6HL1-N	7.2 L; 437.3 cu in (7,166 cc)	180 PS (132 kW)	
6HL1-S	7.2 L; 437.3 cu in (7,166 cc)	205 PS (151 kW)	
6HK1-TCR	7.8 L; 475.4 cu in (7,790 cc)	205 PS (151 kW)	
6HK1-TCN	7.8 L; 475.4 cu in (7,790 cc)	240 PS (177 kW)	
6HK1-TCC	7.8 L; 475.4 cu in (7,790 cc)	260 PS (191 kW)	
6HK1-TCS	7.8 L; 475.4 cu in (7,790 cc)	280 PS (206 kW)	
6HK1-TCH	7.8 L; 475.4 cu in (7,790 cc)	300 PS (221 kW)	
Duramax LG4 7800	7.8 L; 475.4 cu in (7,790 cc)	275 PS (202 kW)	used in GMC medium-duty trucks

== Vehicles ==
- Isuzu F-Series
- Chevrolet T-Series
- Isuzu H-Series
