= UD Kuzer =

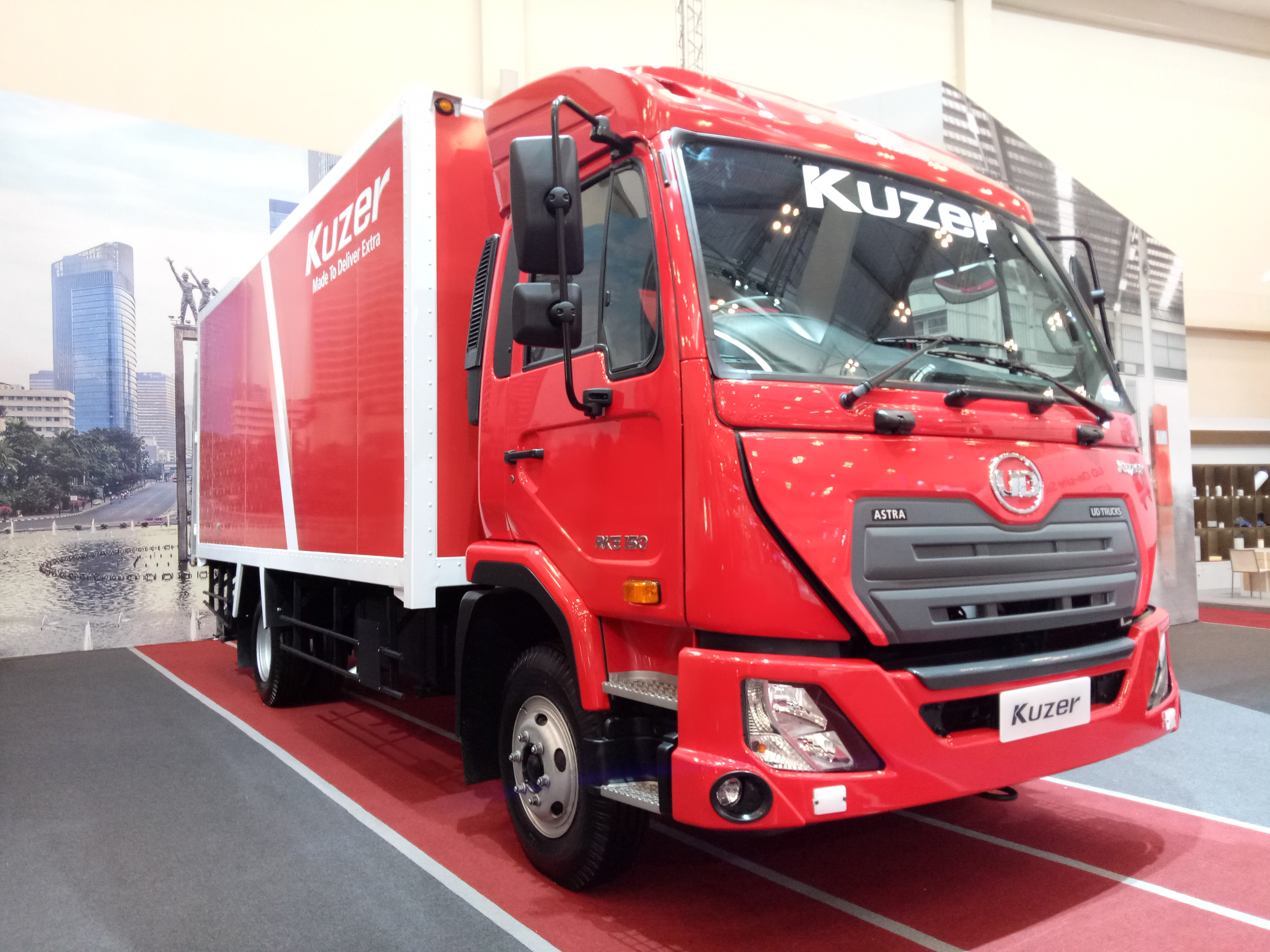

Overview
- Manufacturer: UD Trucks
- Also called: Eicher Pro 3008; Isuzu Elf (2025–present)
- Production: 2017–present

Body and chassis
- Class: Truck
- Body style: Truck
- Related: UD Croner, Nissan Diesel Condor

Powertrain
- Engine: GH4E (based on 3.8 litre Cummins ISF engine)
- Transmission: 6-speed manual

The UD Kuzer (kana:UD・クーザー) is a line of light commercial vehicles produced by UD Trucks with Volvo Group.

== About ==
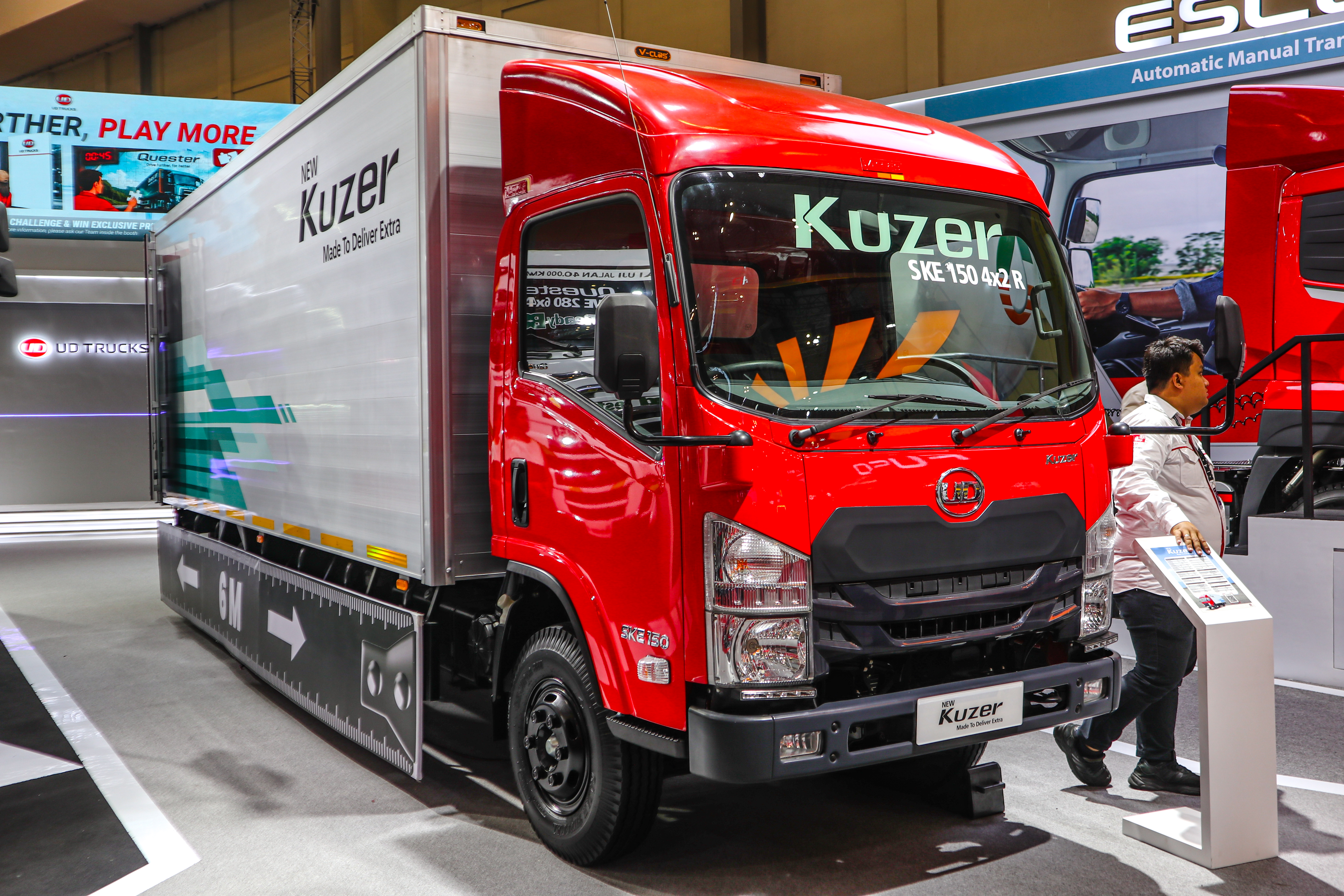
Kuzer SKE 150, based on the Isuzu Elf.

This model is not available in Japan and designed for outside of Japan markets only. Instead, Japan has the UD Kazet.

In 2017, the Kuzer was introduced in Indonesia. In India, it was sold as Eicher PRO 3008. The Eicher is mainly sold in African market, whereas the UD is mainly sold in Asian market.

The cabin is derived from third generation Nissan Diesel Condor Z (narrow cab version). The interior differs depending on where steering wheel is located (LHD or RHD).

== See also ==
- UD Trucks
- UD Kazet
- UD Croner
- UD Quester
- UD SLF
- UD BRT
