= Isuzu HICOM Malaysia =

- Industry: Automotive
- Founded: January 1994
- Headquarters: Pekan, Pahang, Malaysia

Isuzu HICOM Malaysia Sdn. Bhd. (IHM) is a Malaysian commercial vehicle manufacturer operating under a joint venture between the DRB-HICOM and Isuzu companies, based in Peramu Jaya Industrial Area in Pekan, Malaysia.

The company was established in January 1994 as HICOM Commercial Vehicle Sdn. Bhd. and later changes name in April 1996 as Malaysia Truck & Bus Sdn. Bhd. The company took the current name in June 2006 when Isuzu took over the majority of shares. It is based at Peramu Jaya Industrial Area in Pekan, Malaysia. The Chief Executive Officer is Keizo Yoshimura.

The site comprises an area of 14 hectares. 12,000 to 14,000 units are produced here every year.

The company launched HICOM Perkasa, a licensed version of the Isuzu Elf fifth generation in 1996. Its second product, Mercedes-Benz W211, was launched in January 2005. Production of Mitsubishi Fuso Canter for the local market began at the same time. Mercedes-Benz W203 and Mercedes-Benz Actros were added three months later. The last Mercedes-Benz licensed model to launch was the Mercedes-Benz W221 in July 2006. Production of Mercedes-Benz models was later moved to the HICOM Automotive Manufacturers (Malaysia). Isuzu trucks and Isuzu D-Max are the only ones produced here. The newest model is the Isuzu Heavy Duty, a licensed model of Isuzu Forward fourth generation.

== Current models ==
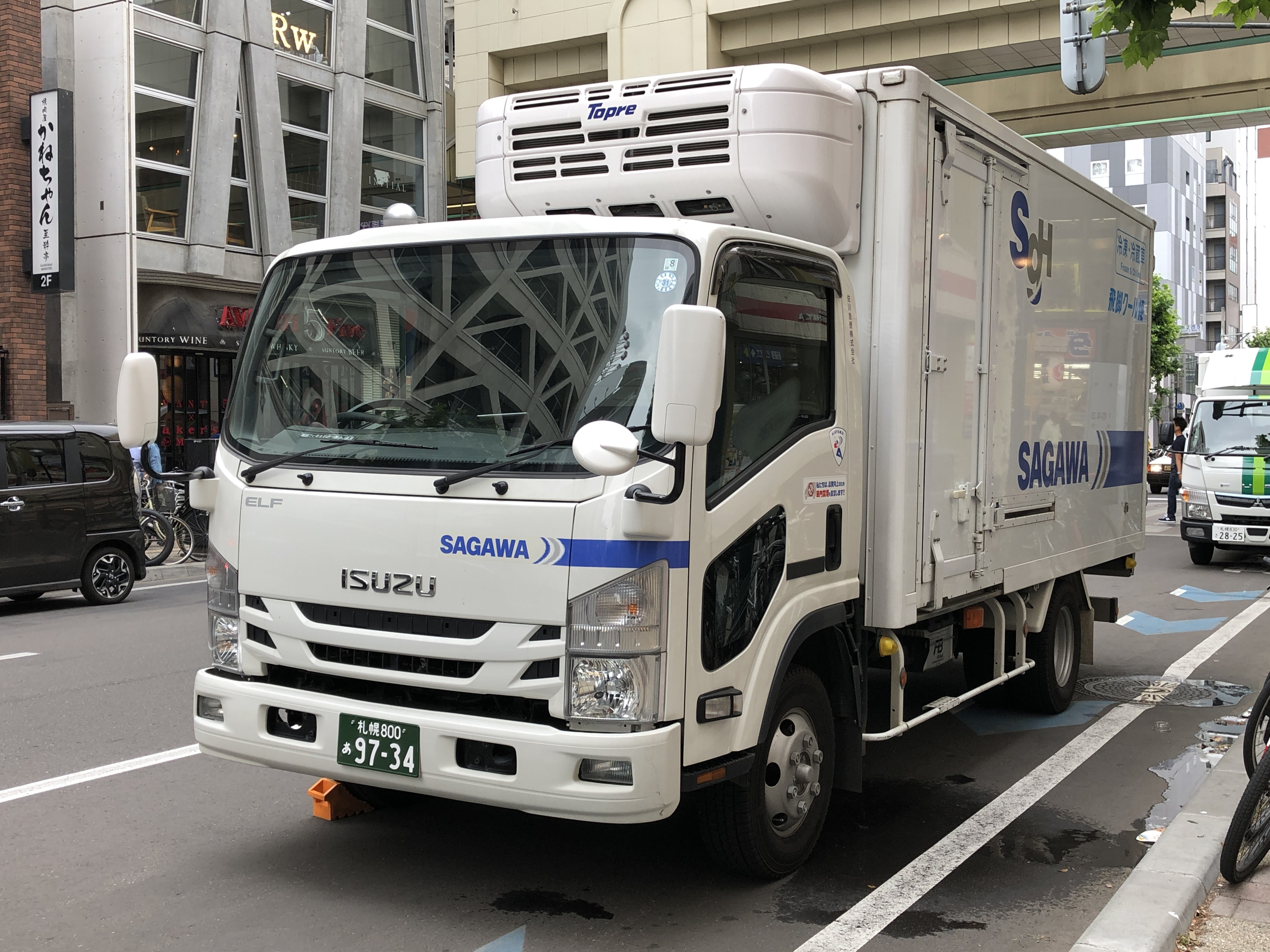
Isuzu Elf
7/1997-present

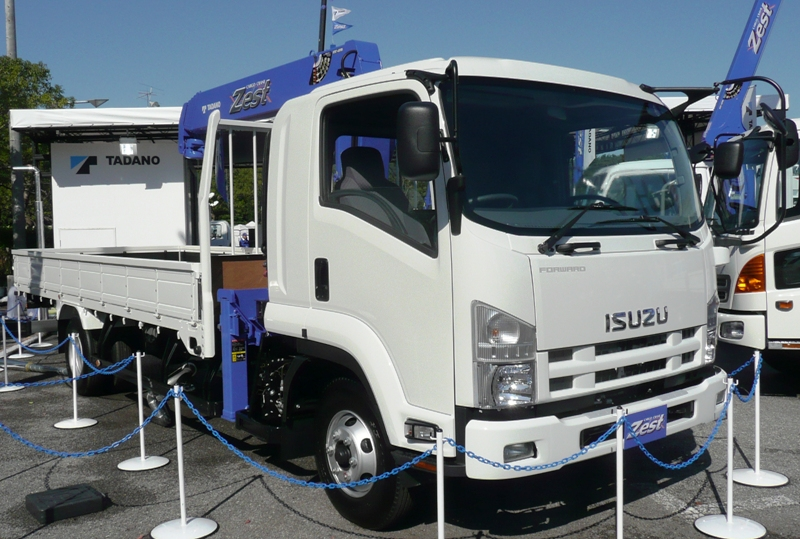
Isuzu Heavy Duty
10/2007-present

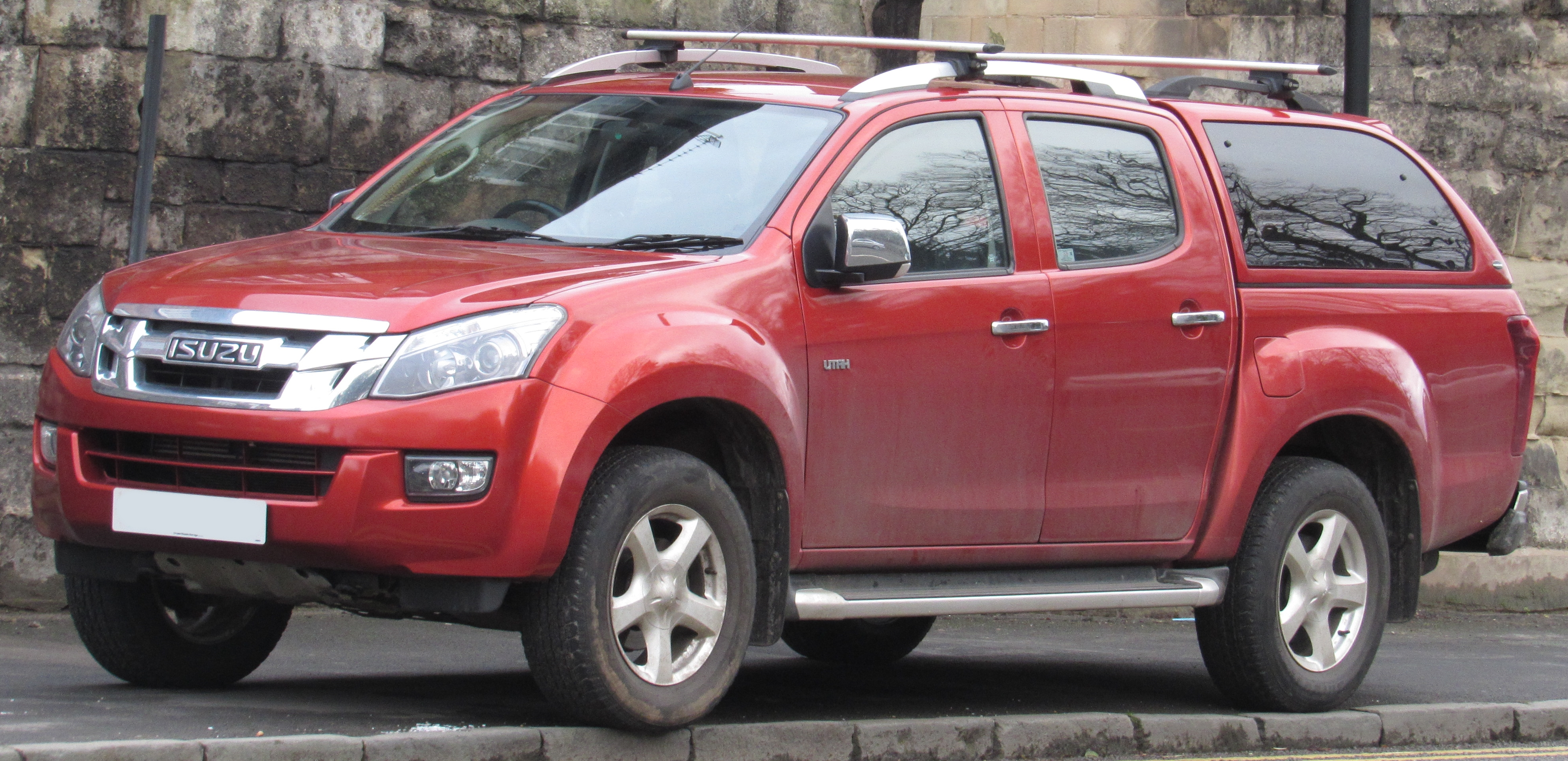
Isuzu D-Max
4/2009-present

== Former models ==
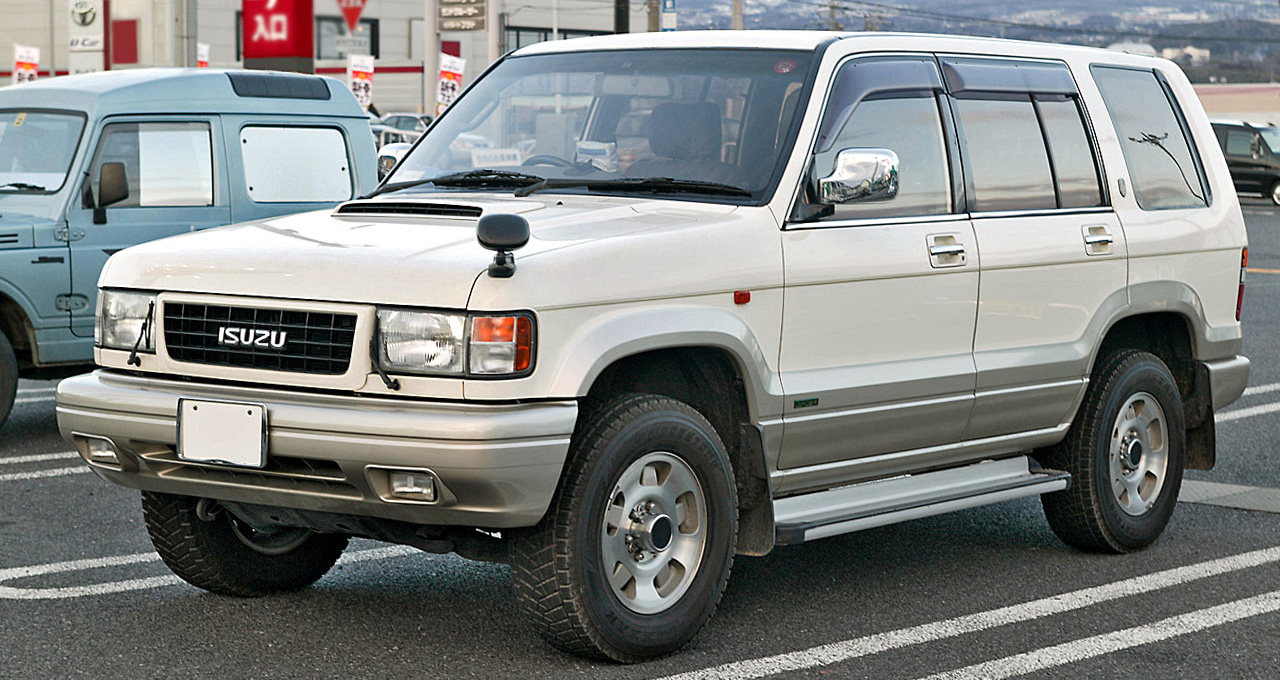
Isuzu Bighorn
1/1998 - 1/2005

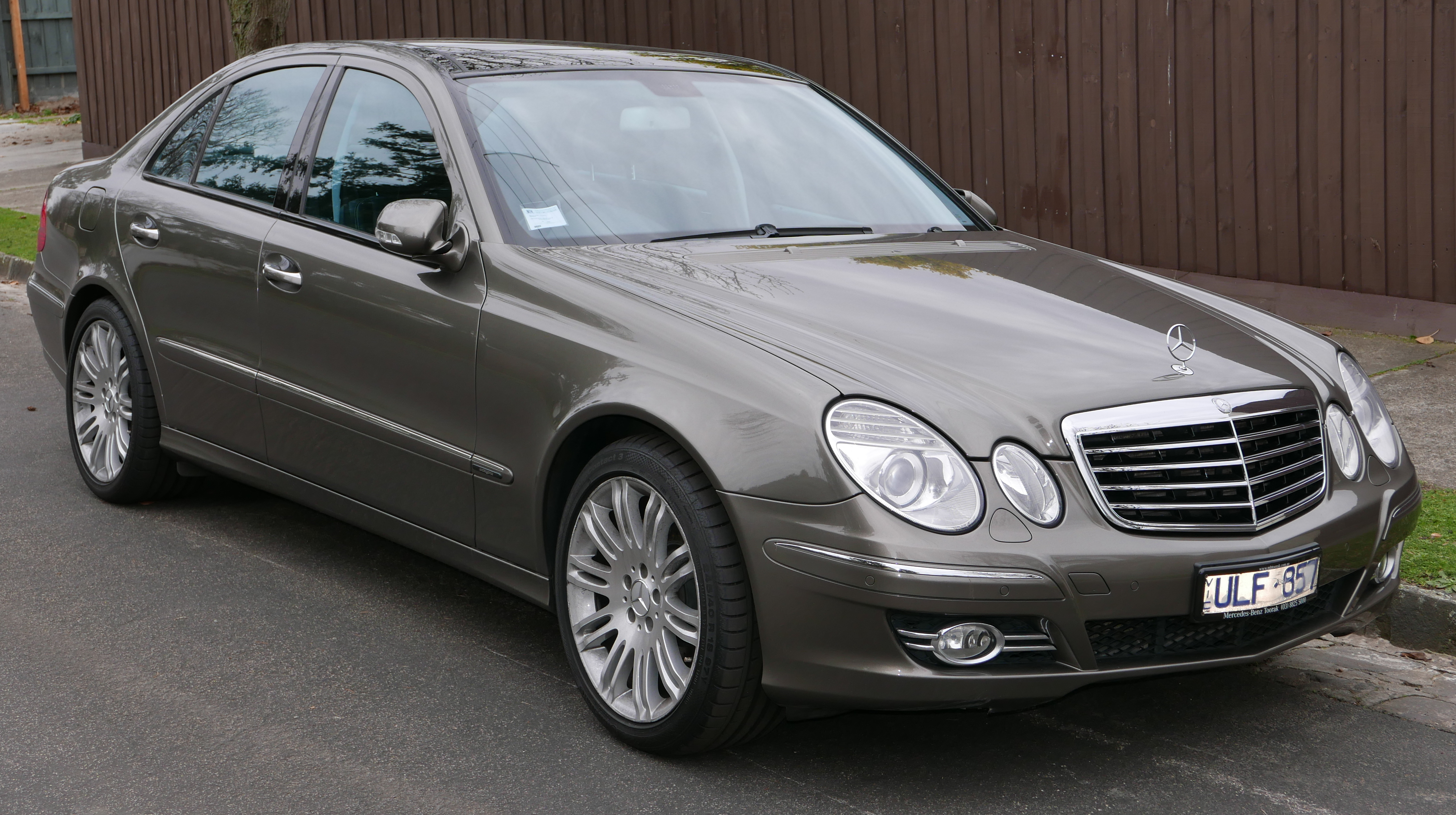
Mercedes-Benz E-Klasse
1/2005 - 10/2007

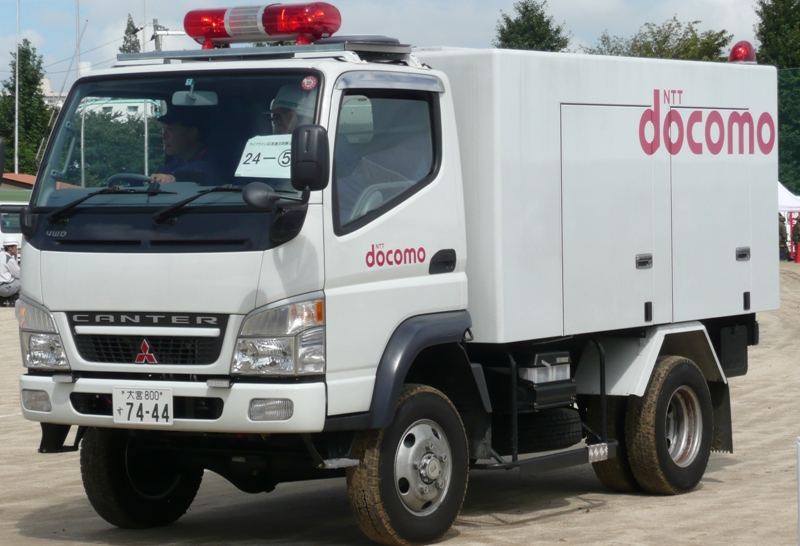
Mitsubishi Fuso Canter
1/2005 - 10/2007

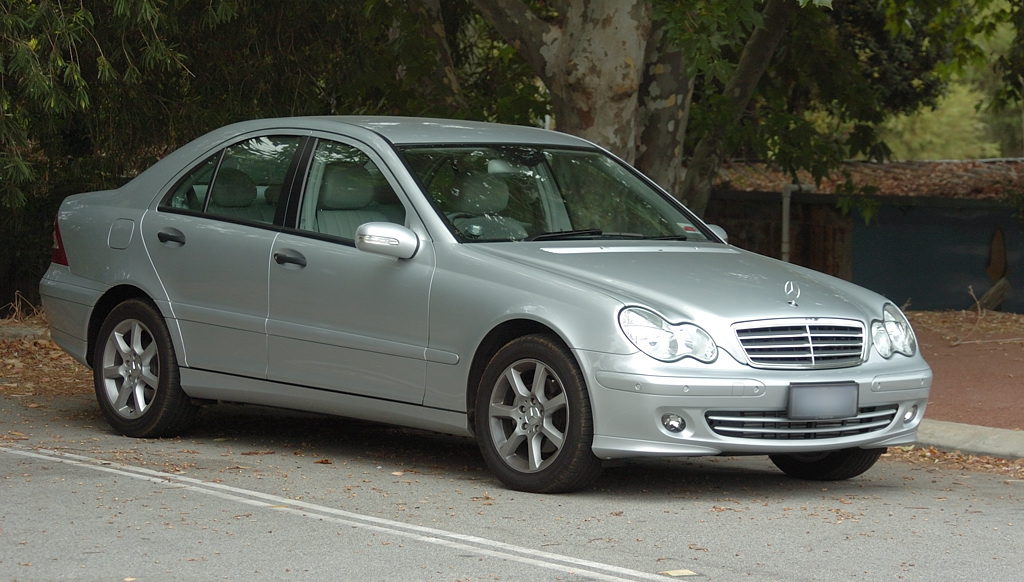
Mercedes-Benz C-Klasse
5/2005 - 10/2007

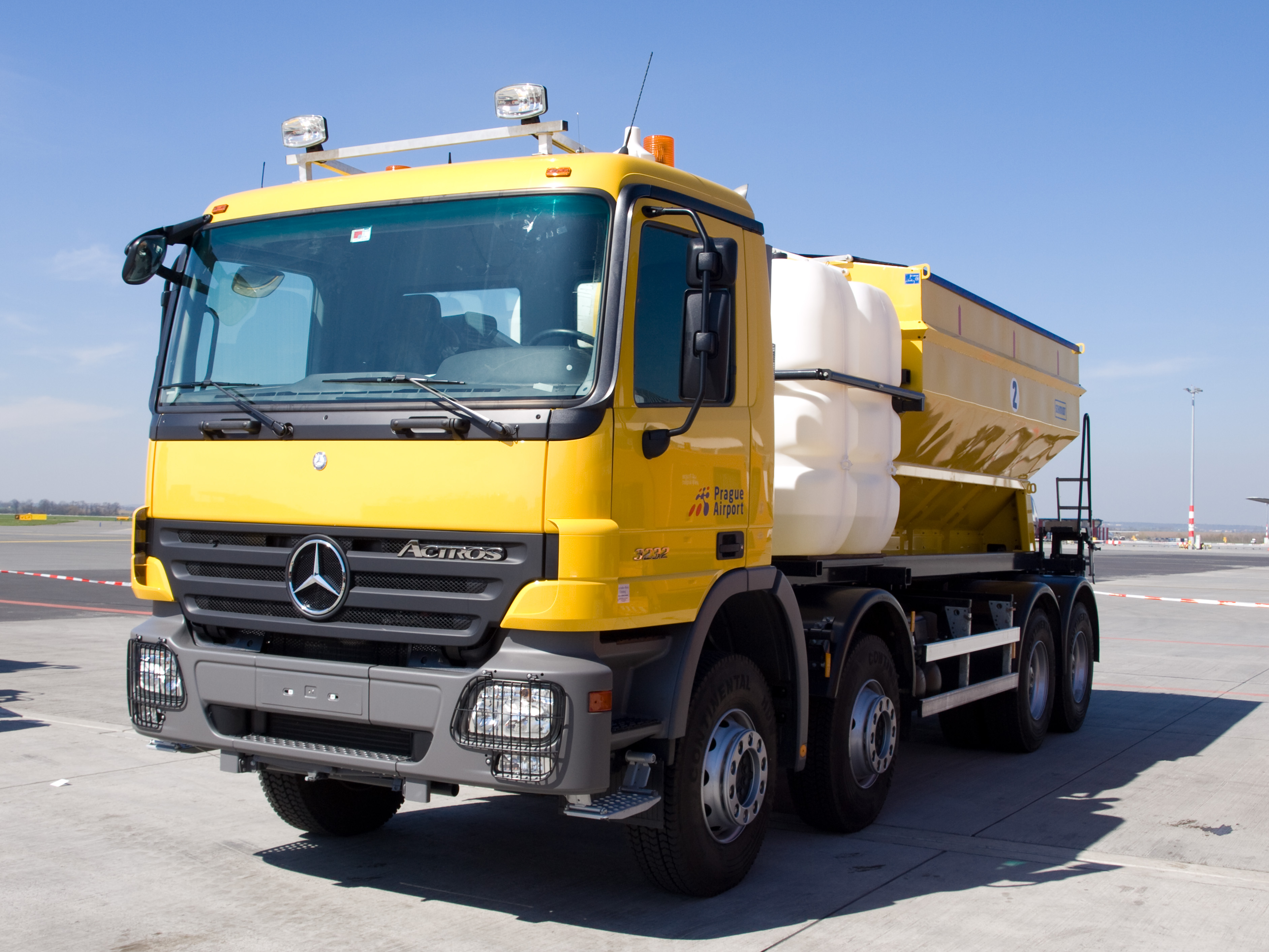
Mercedes-Benz Actros
5/2005 - 10/2007

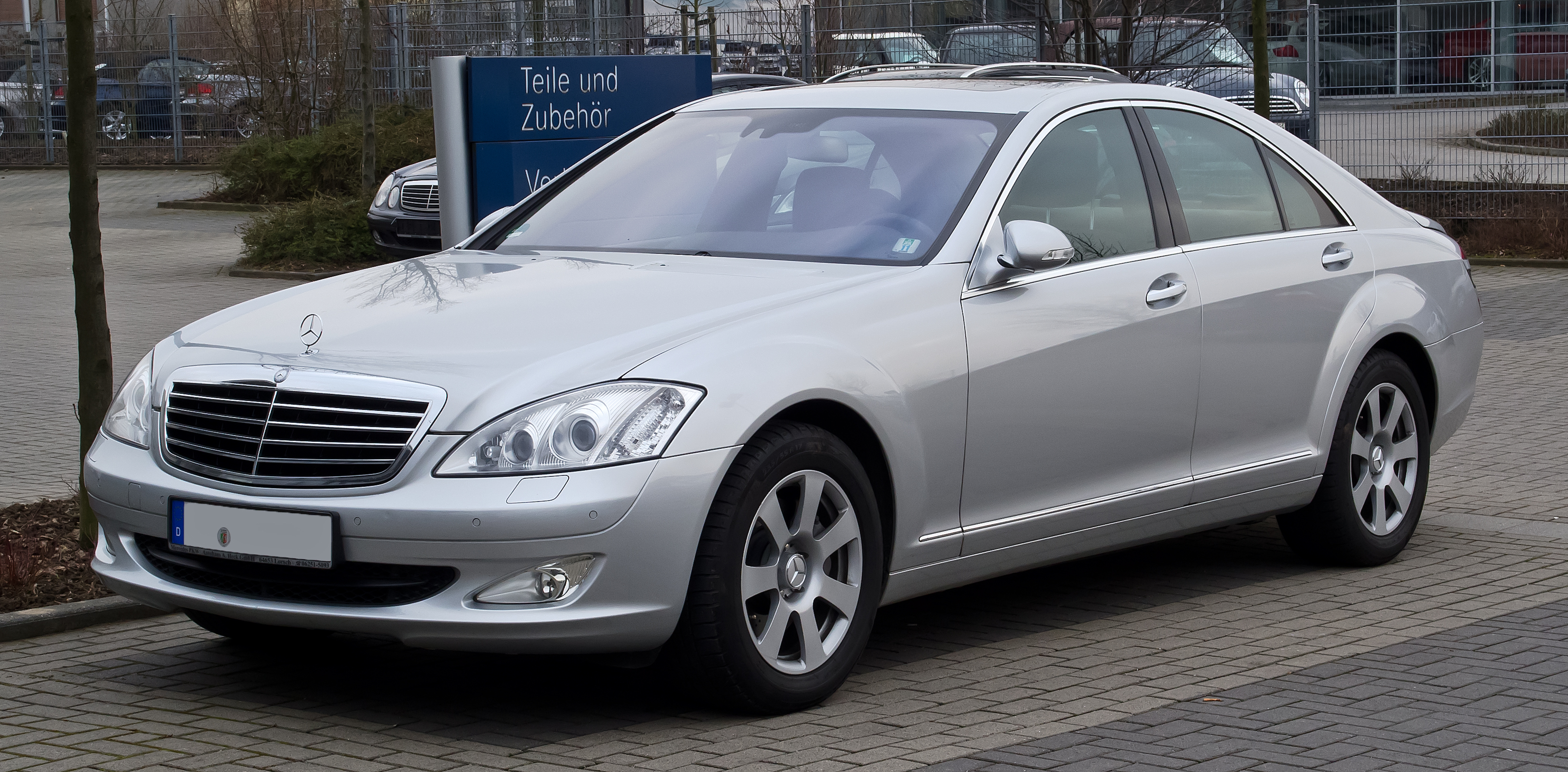
Mercedes-Benz S-Klasse
6/2006 - 10/2007
