= Isuzu Elf =

Medium duty truck

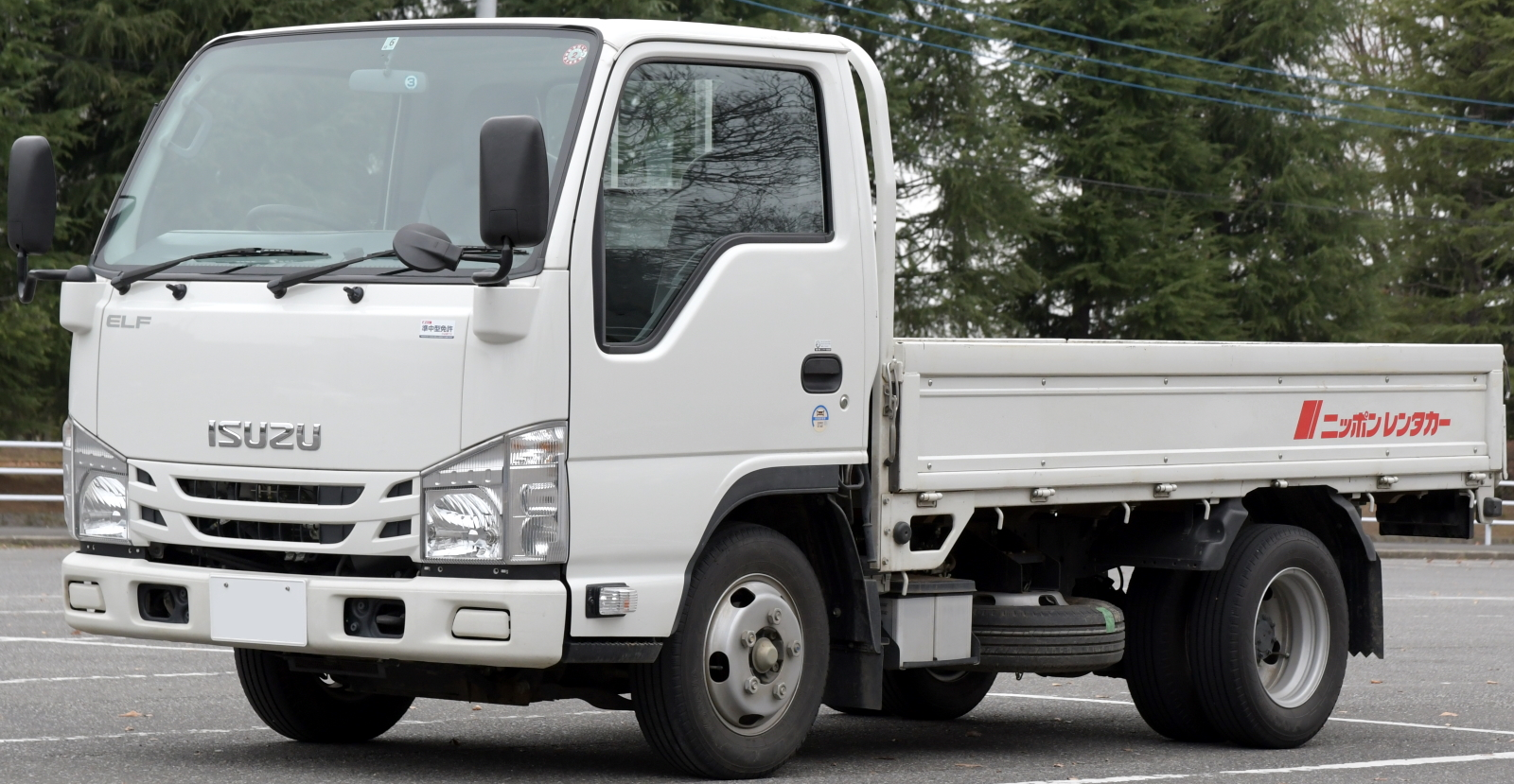

Overview
- Manufacturer: Isuzu
- Also called: Isuzu N-Series/Q-Series (China, Europe, North America, Southeast Asia) List of other names: Isuzu Grafter (United Kingdom); Isuzu Forward Juston (wide cab variant); Isuzu Reward (various markets); Bedford KA50; Bedford NKR; Chevrolet N-Series (Colombia, Egypt); Chevrolet Tiltmaster; Chevrolet W-Series; Chevrolet Low Cab Forward 3500–5500 (United States); Chevrolet 2.5t Cargo Truck (South Korea, 2nd Gen); Daewoo Elf II (South Korea, 3rd Gen); GMC Forward; GMC W-Series; GMK Elf (South Korea, 3rd Gen); Mazda Titan (5th/6th/7th Gen); Nissan Atlas (5th/6th/7th Gen); HICOM Perkasa (Malaysia, 5th Gen); Hino S-Series (North America, 6th Gen); Isuzu Yifang ES/EC (Jiangxi Isuzu, China); Qingling Elf; Saehan Elf (South Korea, 3rd Gen); UD Kazet (7th Gen); UD Kuzer (6th Gen)
- Production: 1959–present
- Assembly: Fujisawa, Kanagawa, Japan List of other assembly plants: Alabuğa, Russia (Sollers-Isuzu); Biñan, Laguna, Philippines (IPC); Bogotá, Colombia; Chongqing, China (Qingling; 1985–present); Fuzhou, China (Fujian Automotive Industry Corporation; FAIC); Guangzhou, China (Guangzhou Yangcheng Automobile; 2000–2008); Nanchang, China (Jiangxi Isuzu); Luton, England (Bedford Vehicles, IBC Vehicles after 1989); Cerea, Italy (MIDI Europe); Ho Chi Minh City, Vietnam (IVC); Istanbul, Turkey (Anadolu Isuzu); Karawang, Indonesia (Isuzu Astra Motor Indonesia); Janesville, Wisconsin, United States (1994–2009); Charlotte, Michigan, United States (2011–present); Pekan, Malaysia (IHM); Samut Prakarn, Thailand (Isuzu Motors Thailand); Taipei, Taiwan (TIM); Ulyanovsk, Russia (Sollers-Isuzu, since 2013); Vendas Novas, Portugal

Body and chassis
- Class: Medium-duty truck
- Body style: 2-door standard cab; 2-door crew cab; 4-door wide cab
- Layout: FMR layout

Powertrain
- Engine: Diesel: 1.9 L RZ4E-TC turbo I4; 5.2 L 4HK1-TC turbo I4; Gasoline: 6.6 L GM L8T V8; List of other/older engines: Diesel: 1.9 L C190 I4; 2.2 L C220 I4; 2.8 L 4BA1 I4; 3.6 L 4BB1 I4; 3.3 L 4BC1 I4; 3.3 L 4BC2 I4; 3.9 L 4BD1 I4; 3.6 L 4BE1 I4; 3.6 L 4BE1-T Turbo I4; 4.3 L 4BG1 I4; 2.5 L 4JA1 I4; 2.8 L 4JB1 I4; 3.0 L 4JH1-TC turbo I4; 3.0 L 4JJ1-TC turbo I4; 3.0 L 4JZ1-TC turbo I4; 4.7 L 4HE1 I4; 4.7 L 4HE1-T turbo I4; 4.3 L 4HF1 I4; 4.3 L 4HF1-T Turbo I4; 4.6 L 4HG1 I4; 4.6 L 4HG1-T turbo I4; 4.7 L 4HL1 I4; 4.7 L 4HL1-T turbo I4
- Transmission: 5-speed manual; 6-speed manual; 6-speed AMT

The Isuzu Elf (Japanese: いすゞ・エルフ, Hepburn: Isuzu Erufu) is a medium duty truck produced by Isuzu since 1959. Outside Japan it is known as N series and Q Series. The range was originally mainly available in Japan and other Asian countries. Australia was another important market for the Elf and N series – to the extent that it was manufactured there from the 1970s using many local components. Since the early 1980s, it has also been sold and built in the United States (under the Chevrolet and GMC brands as a W-Series), and also as the Isuzu N-Series. North America only receives the wide-cab version.

For the common Andean market (including Chile and Peru), the truck has been assembled in the GM-Colmotores assembling plant in Bogotá, Colombia since 1991, with annual quantities already of 20,000 up to 60,000 units. Local assembly has been increasing because of increasing demand in the Colombian and neighboring markets. It carries "Tecnología Isuzu" (with Isuzu Technology) lettering.

In Indonesia, Philippines, and several other countries, the Elf is not only used as a truck, but also converted into microbuses by local body makers. The lighter four-wheeled models are commonly used as an intercity Angkot or Jeepney (share taxis), as a school bus, or as an employee bus. Indonesian conversions typically use car-style hinged doors and usually resemble a high-roof van, while most conversions in Kenya, and newer ones in the Philippines often resemble a minibus, with a folding door on the side for passengers, and standing room.

== First generation ==
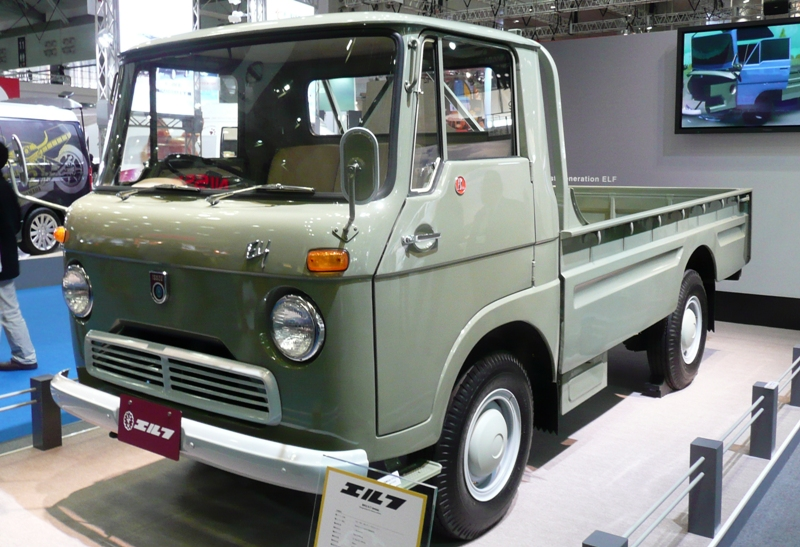
Isuzu Elf first generation (1959–1965 model)

The cab-over 2-tonne (4,400 lb) Elf (TL221) was originally introduced in August 1959. It was originally only available with the 1.5 L (1,491 cc) GL150 gasoline engine rated at 60 PS (44 kW). It had single headlights and rear-hinged doors. A longer wheelbase version, on 2,460 mm (97 in) versus the 2,180 mm (86 in) of the regular version, was also available. This carries the TL251 chassis code.

In March 1960, a 2.0-liter diesel engine rated at 52 PS (38 kW) was introduced (TL121/151), a first for the class in Japan – this was soon followed by diesel models from Isuzu's competitors. In 1962 the engines were updated, and were now rated at 72 and 55 PS (53 and 40 kW) respectively. The chassis codes were changed to TL321/351 for the diesel version, reflecting the installation of the all new DL201 engine. A little later on, the chassis codes were reorganized and were now TLG10/11 for the petrol models and TLD10/11 for the diesels. In 1964, the long wheelbase model became the standard version. In 1964, the diesel version was also upgraded to the larger 2.2-litre C220 engine rated at 62 PS (46 kW). In 1965, the Elf received a facelift, now having twin headlights.

Isuzu ended up offering a very wide variety of bodyworks for the first generation Elf. These include the original integrated bed, as well as a separate truckbed with dropsides. There was a double-cab version available, as well as special bodywork for dedicated purposes such as a soda truck, a dumper, and a tanker. There was also a "Route Van" model with a glazed rear compartment and seating either three or six passengers, as well as the "Elf Bus" which was available in two models from 1960. The Elf Light Bus has integrated bodywork with the long wheelbase and seats 21 passengers (chassis codes BL171/271 for the diesel/petrol) while the Elf Micro Bus fits into the very narrow slot between the Route Van and the Light Bus. The Micro Bus originally had the Route Van's bodywork but was more passenger-oriented (seating 12 or 15). It carried the TL121/151/21/251B chassis codes, and from 1961 it received its own rear bodywork with bigger glazing. The Elf Bus later became its own line, called the Isuzu Journey.

== Second generation ==
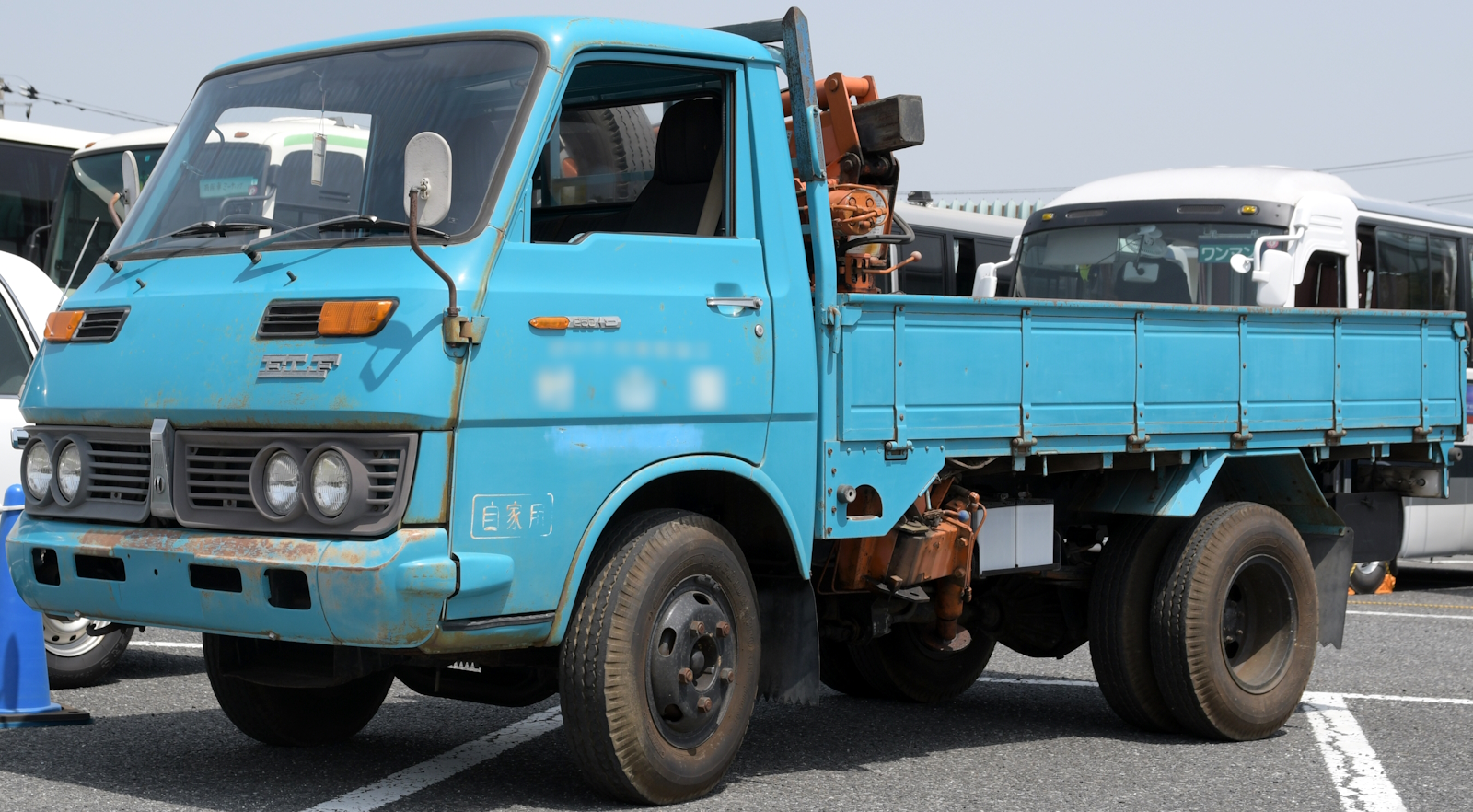
1967 Isuzu Elf 250

In August 1967, the all-new "Isuzu Light Elf" was added to the existing lineup; this lighter duty version was rated for a 1.25-tonne payload (2,800 lb). It had single round headlights and a KA-series chassis code; it came with the same 1,471 cc (1.5 L) G150 engine as fitted to period Isuzu Belletts, rated at 68 PS (50 kW). This was the first of the second generation Elfs to be introduced, heavier duty models soon followed and replaced the first generation variants.

In April 1968, the second generation Elf appeared (TL21/TLD21 series). A walk-through van ("Elf Hi-Roof") was also introduced, another first for Japan. In September 1969, the "Light Elf" was upgraded to 1.5-tonne (3,300 lb) and now offered a more powerful 1.6-liter engine (G161AB) rated at 75 PS (55 kW). In October 1970, this part of the range became the Elf 150 while the regular Elf (2-2.5 tonnes) became the Elf 250; the 250 was updated to a 2.4-litre diesel engine. This was combined with the introduction of the heavier duty, 3.5-tonne (7,700 lb) Elf 350. This re-shake of the lineup was then followed by the very modern Elf Mi-Pack in April 1972. The Mi-Pack was a front-wheel drive model with a flat and low loading floor, only 450 mm (17.7 in) off the ground. Because of its high price combined with customer reluctance to a front-wheel drive truck it was retired after only a few years on the market. Instead a low-floor model of the Elf 150 was added to the lineup in 1974, featuring small twinned rear tires.

The heavier duty Elf 350 was not immediately replaced but continued in production until the 1980 model year, when in February a 350 model of the third generation Elf was introduced ("350 Wide").

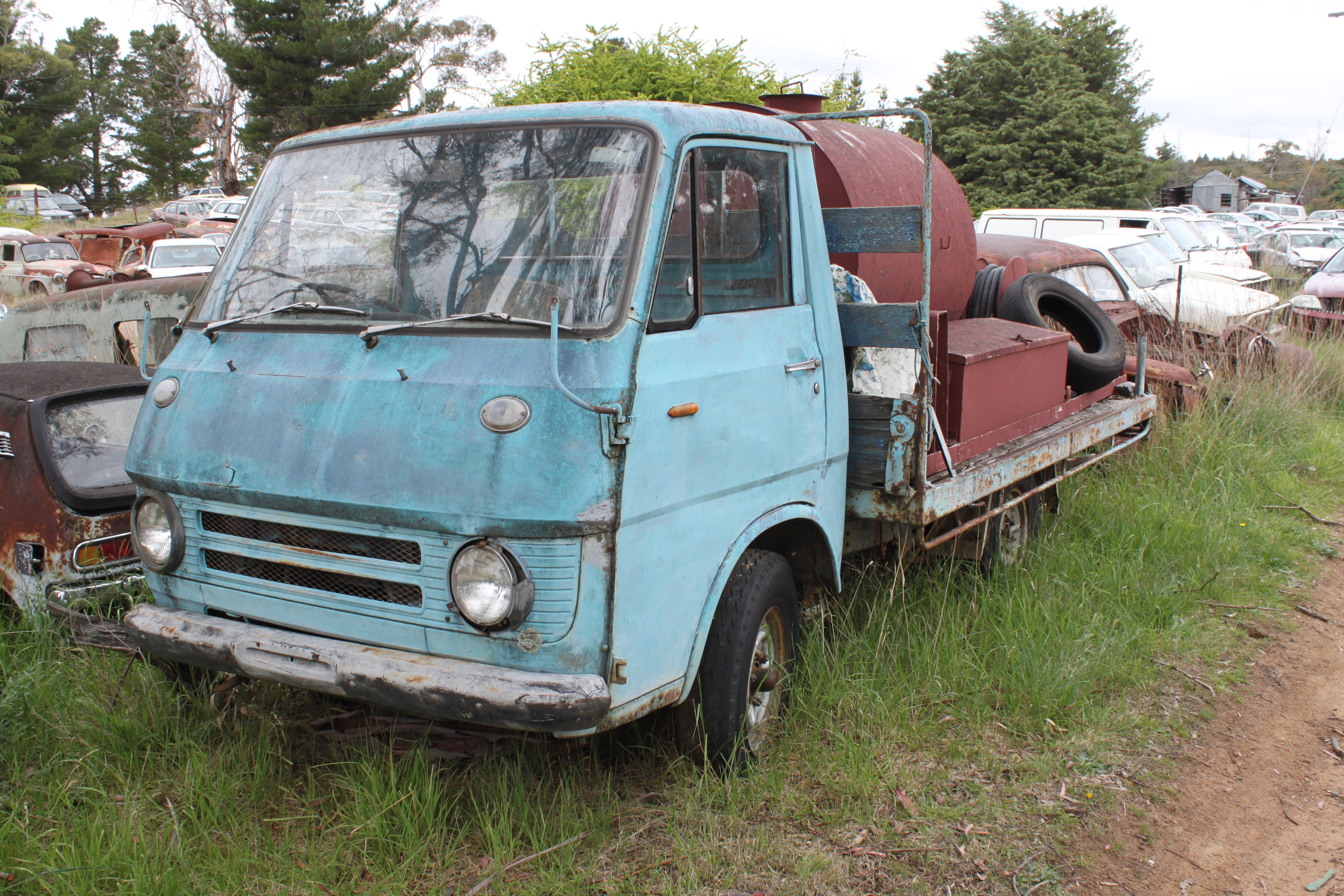
Isuzu Light Elf

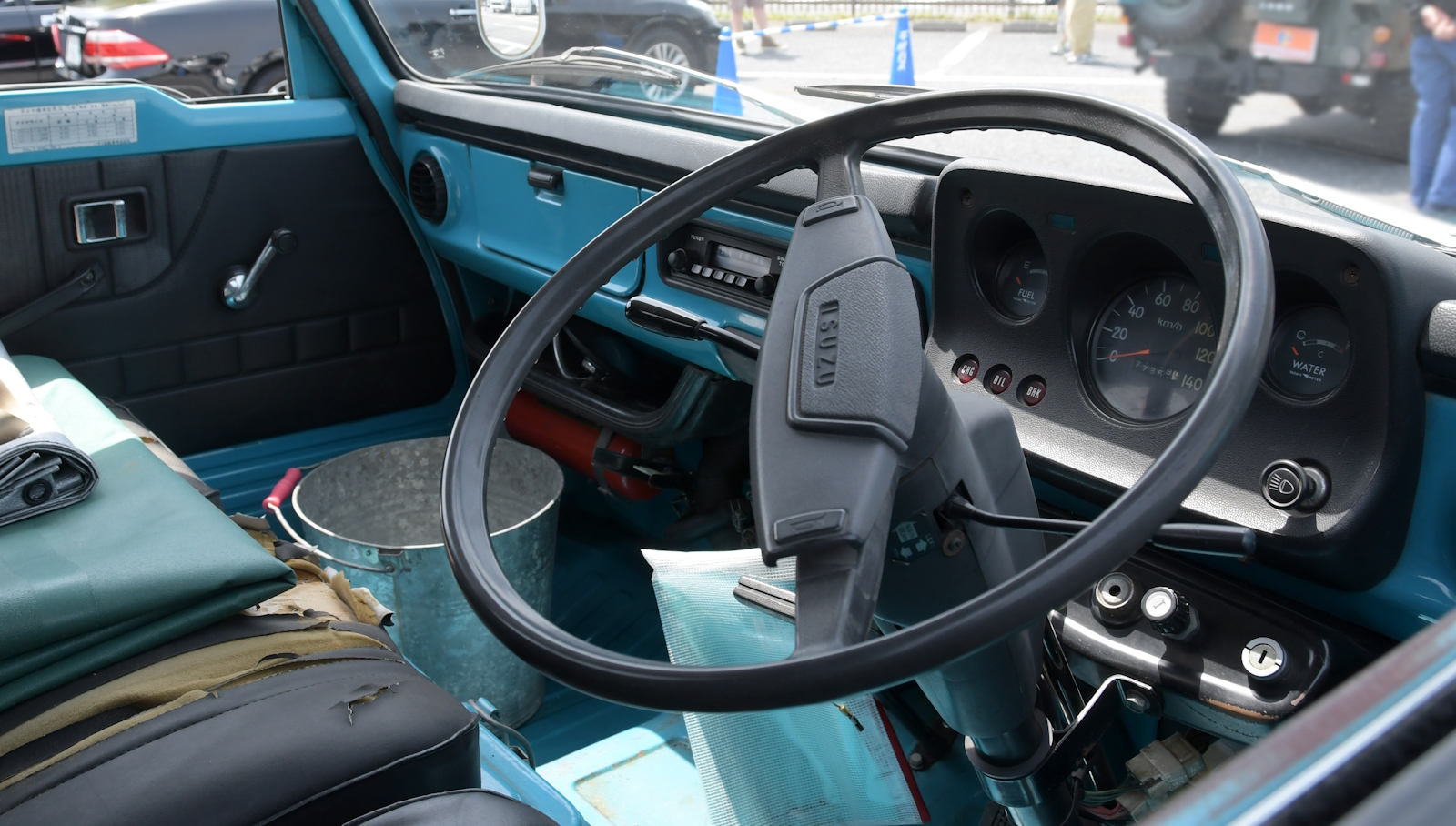
Elf 250 interior

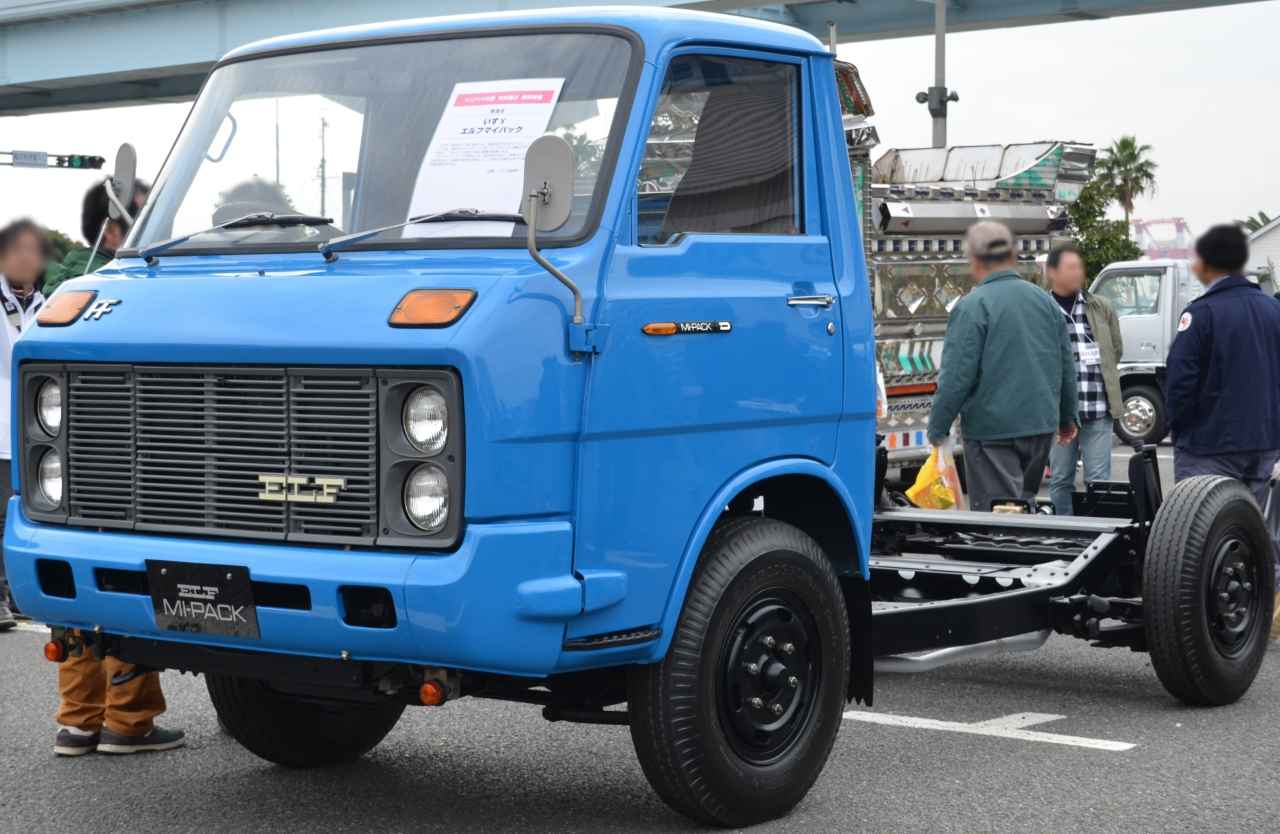
1972 Isuzu Elf MiPack

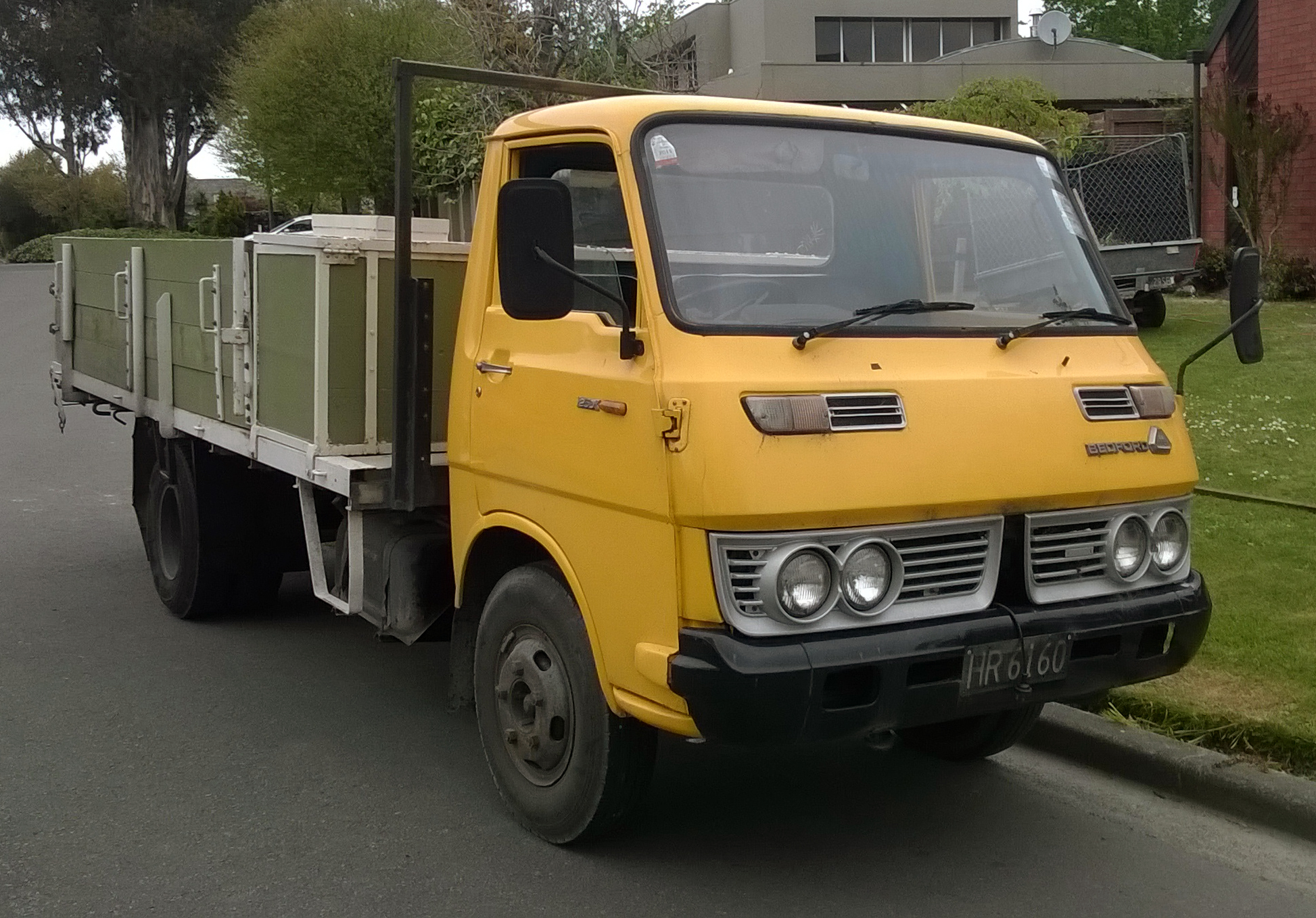
1974 Bedford-Isuzu KA50 Elf

== Third generation ==
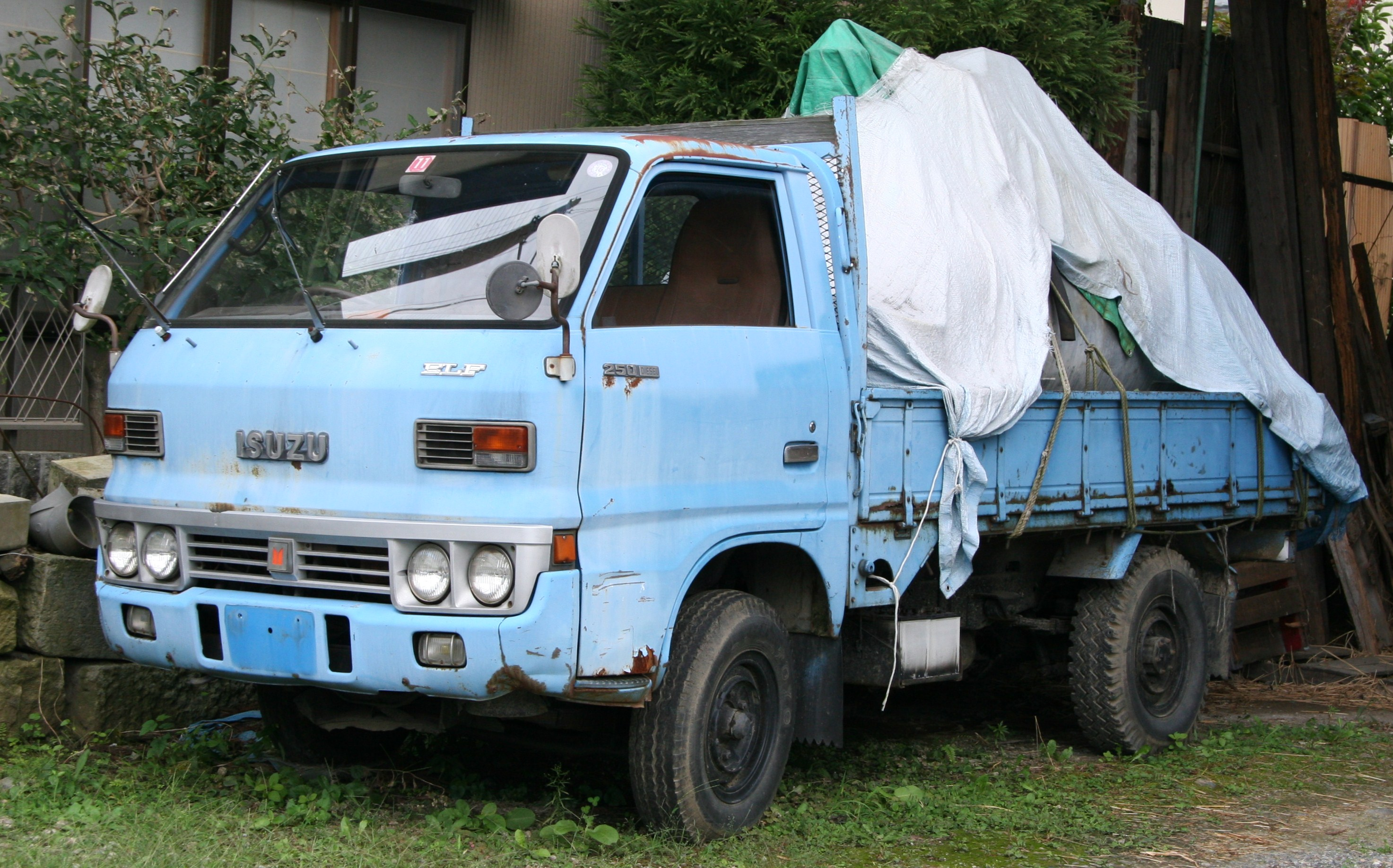
Isuzu Elf 250 (1975–1981)

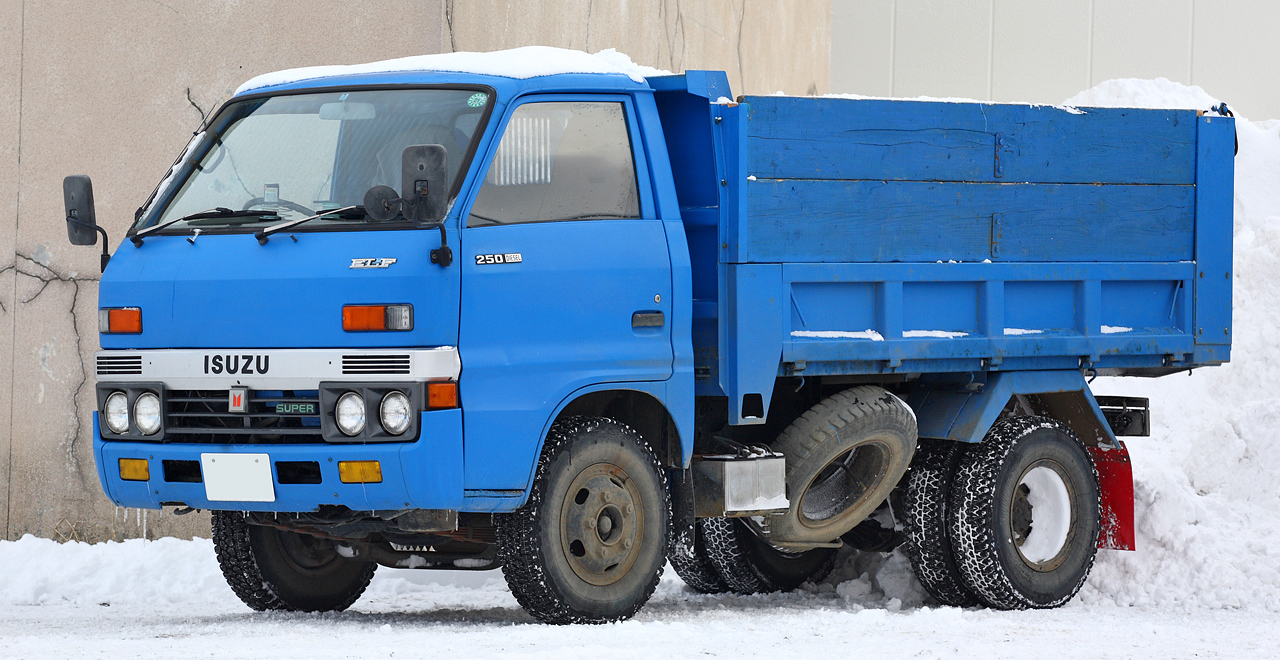
Third generation Elf 250 Super, second facelift (1981–1984)

The third generation Elf arrived in June 1975. Initial models were the Elf 150 and 250. It was nicknamed "Tora-san" after Kiyoshi Atsumi's (a famous Japanese actor) most beloved film character which supposedly looked similar. In January 1977, a 250 Low-Flat model was added, followed in 1978 by a facelift and an altered front grille. In 1979 a bigger 3.3-liter version of the 2-tonne (4,400 lb) Elf 250 was introduced, called the "Elf 250 Super". There was also an "Elf 150 Super" version, which has the larger, 2.4-liter C240 diesel engine which was usually installed in the Elf 250. In 1978, Isuzu also sold their millionth Elf. In January 1980, the Elf was updated to meet Japan's 1979 emissions standards, which was also when the design was changed to accommodate a tilting cab. The Elf 250 Wide and 350 Wide were added, with KT and KS chassis codes respectively, meaning that the second generation Elf 350 could finally be retired. The Elf Wide has a cabin width of 1,910 mm (75.2 in), rather than the 1,690 mm (66.5 in) cabin used in the TL and KA series Elfs.

In 1981, the Elf range underwent another facelift, with an updated dashboard as well. For the third generation Elf the diesel engines had been modernized for more ease of operation, while the world's then smallest direct injection diesel engine – the 3.3-liter 4BC2 – was also introduced. It arrived in 1982 and replaced the less powerful 4BC1 which had been introduced in 1979. In March 1983, the diesel engines were again modified, reflecting new Japanese emissions standards for commercial vehicles. While the third generation Elf was mostly replaced in 1984, the "Route Van" (three- or six-seater van version) continued in production until the early 1990s. With the same bodywork there was also a more habitable bus version available; this was marketed as the Isuzu Journey S and was based on the Elf 150 (KAD51ZB).

Chassis codes
code	engine		output			models
code	engine		PS	kW	rpm	models
KA41/51	G161, petrol I4	1,584 cc	84	62	5,200	Elf 150
KAD41/51	C190, diesel I4	1,951 cc	62	46	4,400	Elf 150, Journey S
KAD42/52, TLD23	C240, diesel I4	2,369 cc	74	54	3,800	Elf 150 Super, Elf 250
TLD24/34/44/54/64	4BA1, diesel I4	2,775 cc	85	63	4,000	Elf 250
TLD55	4BC1, diesel I4	3268 cc	95	70	3,500	Elf 250 Super
TLD26/36/46/56, KT16/26/36/46	4BC2, DI diesel I4	3268 cc	100	74	3,500	Elf 250 Super, Elf 250 Wide
KS	4BD1, diesel I4	3,856 cc	110	81	N/A	Elf 350 Wide

== Fourth generation ==
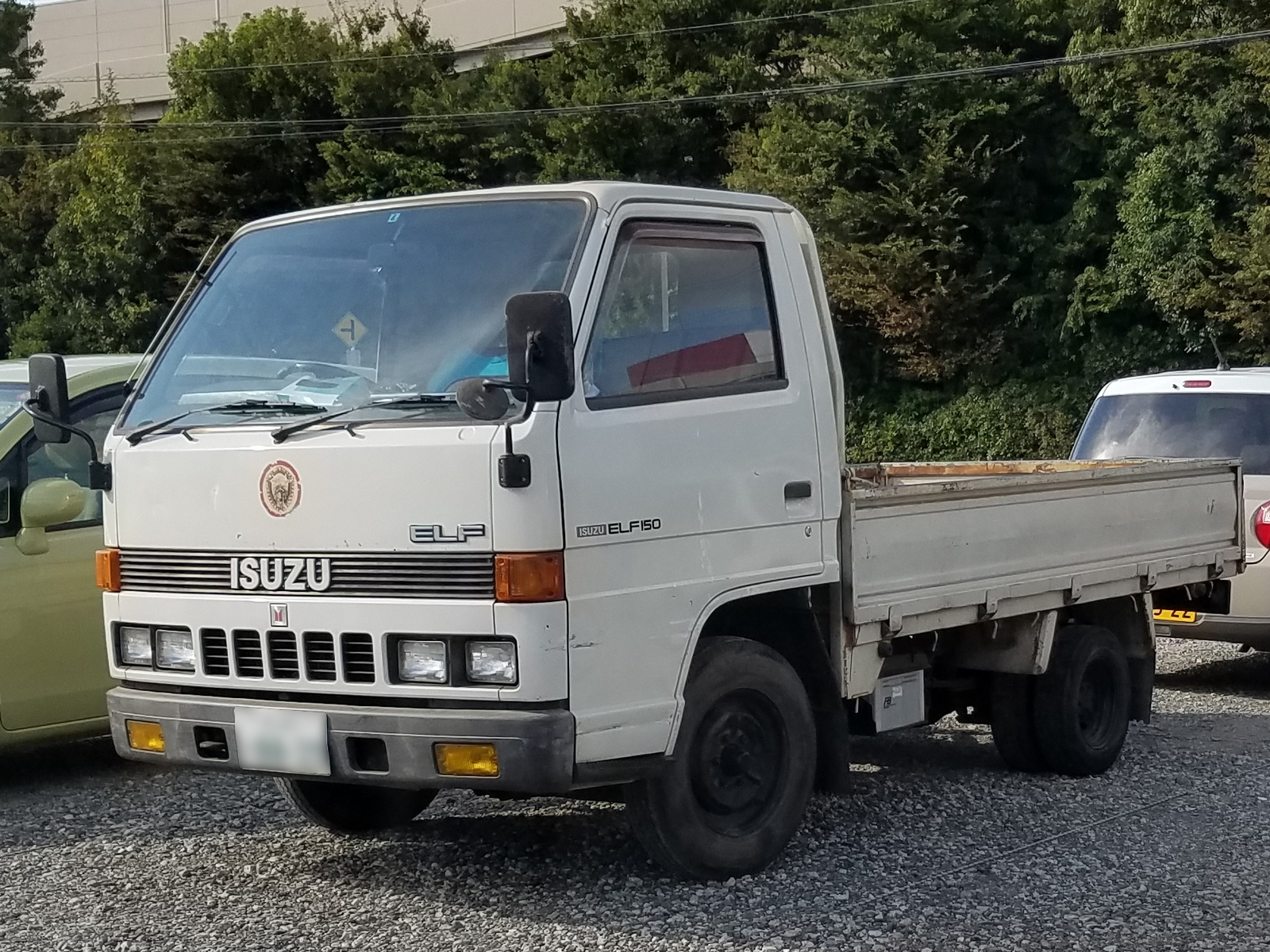
Isuzu Elf 150

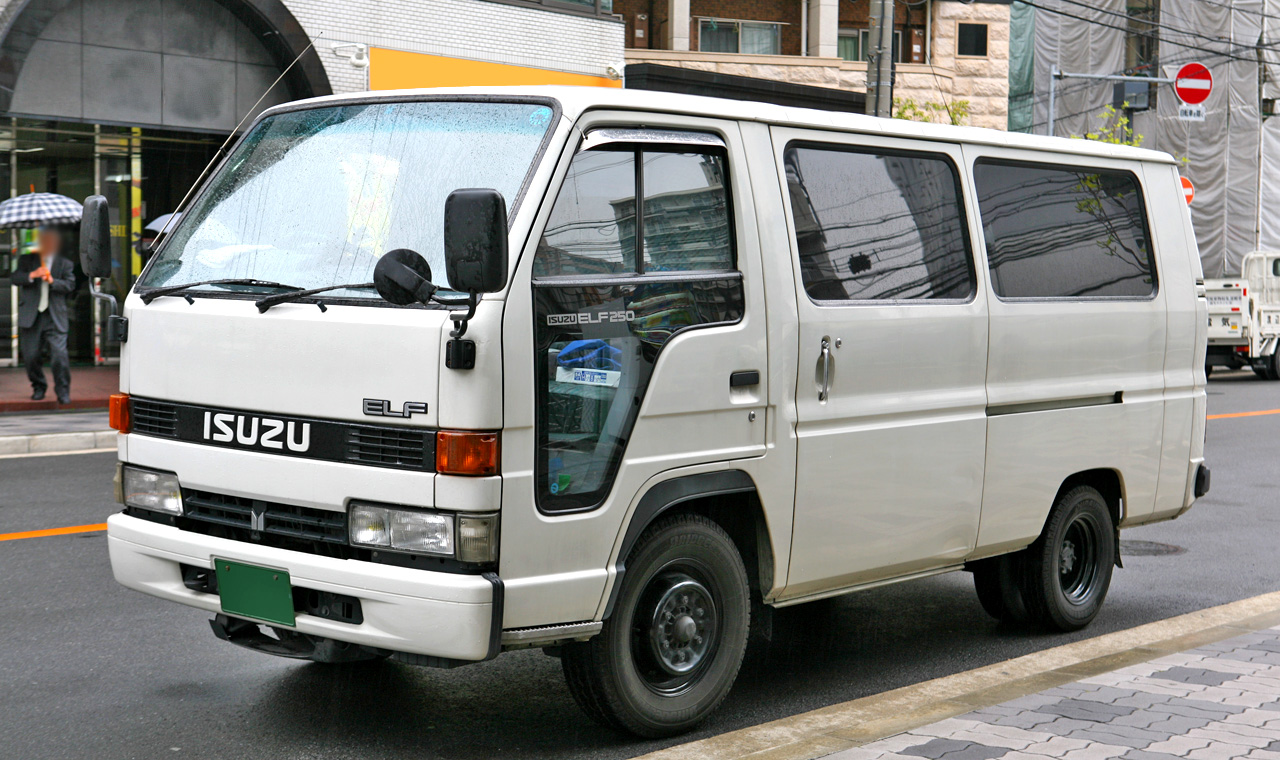

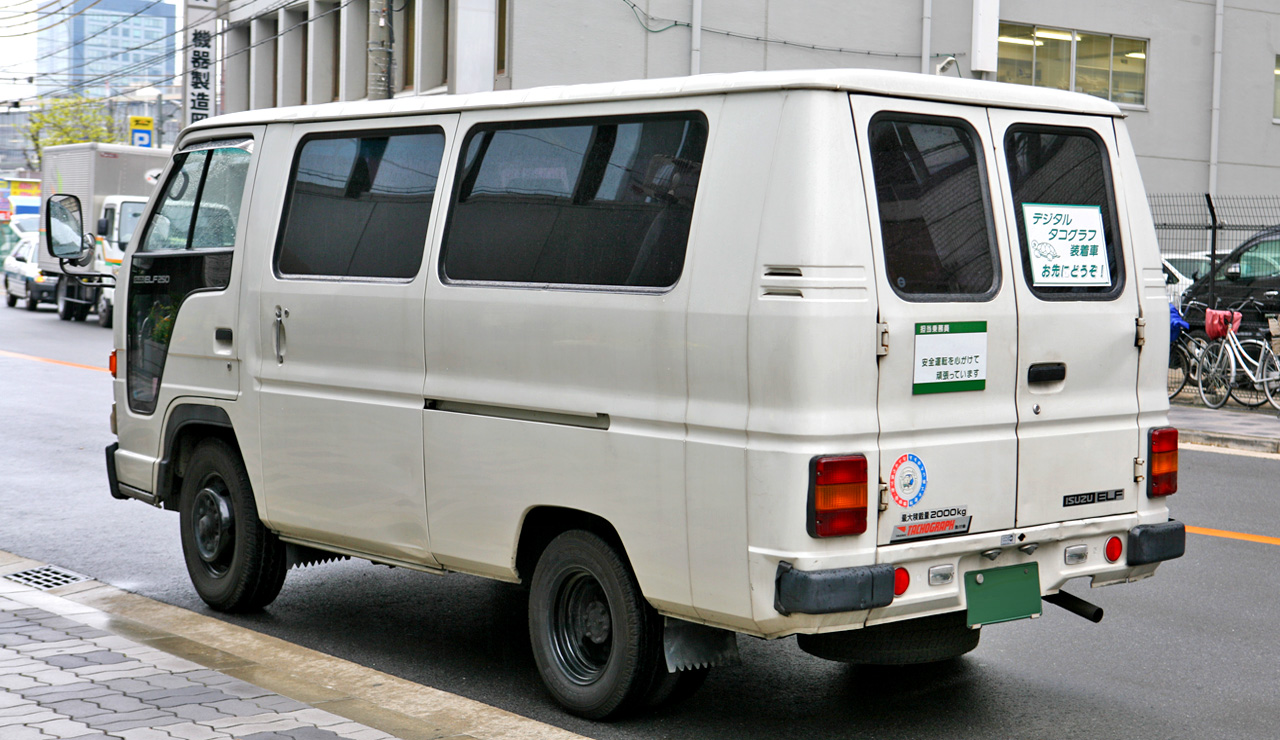
Post-facelift Isuzu Elf Route-van

The fourth generation Elf range appeared in July 1984. This generation of the Elf was exported widely across the world and manufactured in several different countries, including the United States. It was also the first model to use the long-running Isuzu N-series label. The fourth Elf/N series originally had twin rectangular headlamps and a grille with five separate segments (seven for the Wide Cab models). In February 1987, a facelifted version with a grille of only two larger segments appeared, at which time the engine lineup was also altered. This was followed by a second facelift in June 1990, after which the grille became a single, lower opening and the headlights were changed to more aerodynamic, single-piece units. This generation was the last to be-rebadged as a Bedford in Australian and European markets, some months after the discontinuation of the similar Bedford TK and TL trucks, with the Isuzu badge used from 1992, although UK variants were still assembled at the IBC (Isuzu Bedford Company) Vehicles plant.

In Japan this generation was only offered with direct injection diesel engines, introducing the new 2.5-liter 4JA1 family which replaced the long running C240 as the standard Elf engine. In September 1987 a four-wheel drive version of the Elf 250 was introduced; this was originally only available with the 110 PS (81 kW) 4BE1 engine. There was also a new 2.8-liter 87 PS (64 kW) 4JB1 family engine with dual mode transmission, and the 3.6-liter 4BE1 direct injection engine for the Elf 250 and Elf 350 NPR. In September 1987, the heavier Elf 350 Wide version was added to the range. Later, the long stroke 4BD1 direct injection engine with or without a turbocharger was added to the Elf 250. In December 1986, Isuzu added their interesting NAVi5 transmission, an electronically controlled five-speed manual which could also be shifted automatically, to make the truck easier to drive.

This model was also manufactured in China, by BLAC (Beijing Light Automobile Corporation) from 1984 until 2002. Later it was also built by YCACO, a subsidiary of Guangzhou. After a company reorganization it has been built by them as the Guangzhou Hino 300J (YC5040XXY) since 2008, with a redesigned front and various other improvements.

=== United States ===
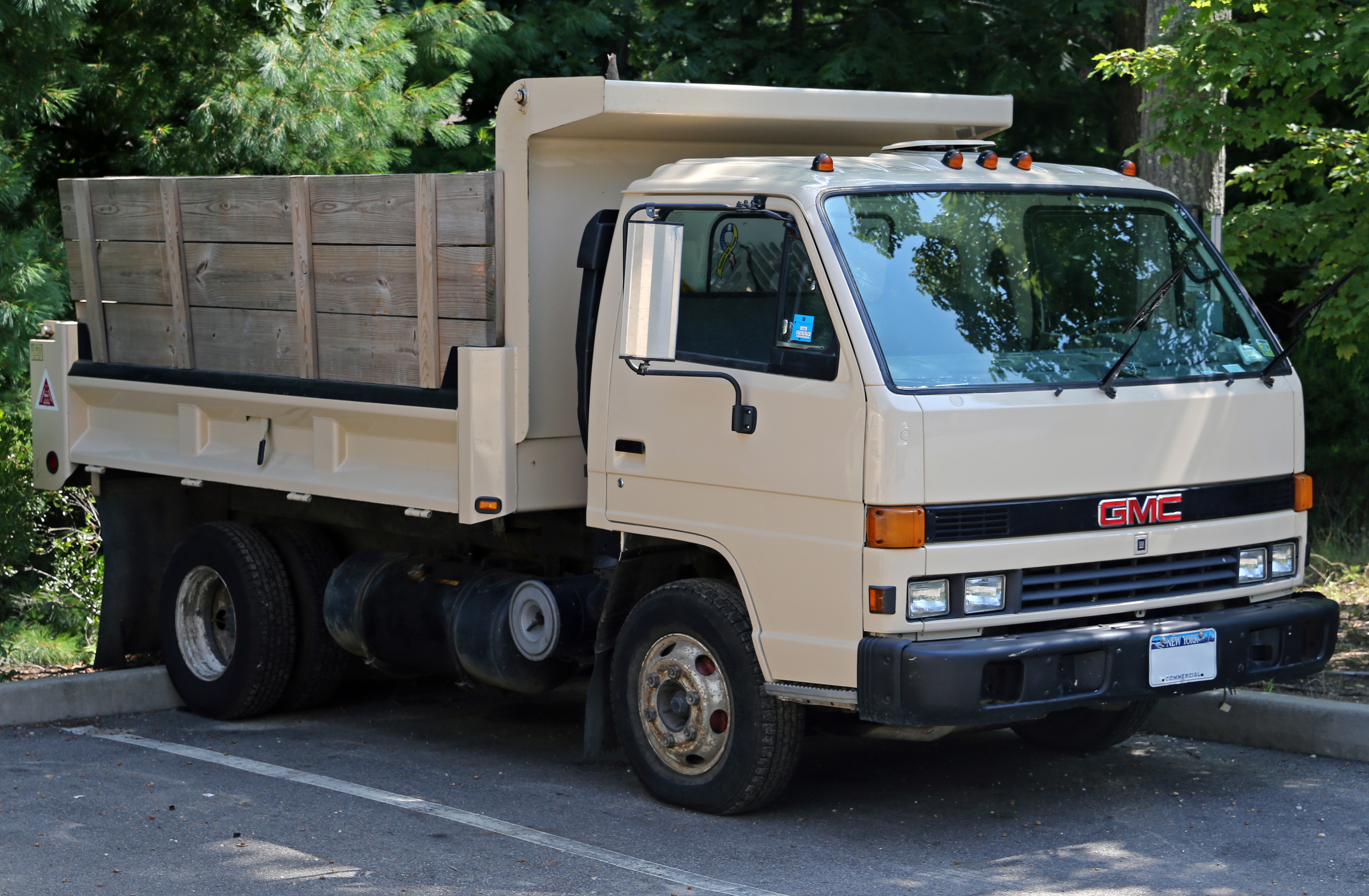
1993 GMC Forward, a rebadged Isuzu Elf

In the US, it was sold as the Chevrolet Tiltmaster and as the GMC Forward, which replaced their L series which had been introduced in 1960. These trucks arrived for the 1984 model year and had a 165 hp (123 kW) turbo-diesel straight-six engine. In 1986 a heavier duty 220 hp (164 kW) 8.4-litre diesel version of the Forward (W7) was added to the US market. The Forward and the Tiltmaster were offered as Class 3 or Class 5 trucks, with 13,250 or 16,000 lb (6,010 or 7,260 kg) GVWR respectively. The smaller Tiltmaster/Forward W4 has a 126 hp (94 kW) diesel inline-four engine while the heavier W6 received a 154 hp (115 kW) six-cylinder diesel. These models were also sold as the Isuzu NPR/NRR respectively, with Isuzu adding the "Flatlow" model with low-profile 15-inch rear tires for a lower frame height.

While US sales of the Chevrolet-badged Spectrum passenger cars always exceeded those of Isuzu's own corresponding model, the Chevrolet/GMC-badged trucks sold slower than their Isuzu counterparts. In 1986, for instance, 507 W4 Tiltmasters and 1,292 W4 Forwards were sold, as against 4,954 equivalent NPRs (2,267 GM-badged W7s were also sold; Isuzu did not market a version of this truck). In 1986, Isuzu and General Motors also combined their systems for importing and distributing these trucks rather than importing them separately.

In 2009 both the Chevrolet Kodiak and the Isuzu H-Series trucks were discontinued, with the W-Series taking their place.

== Fifth generation ==
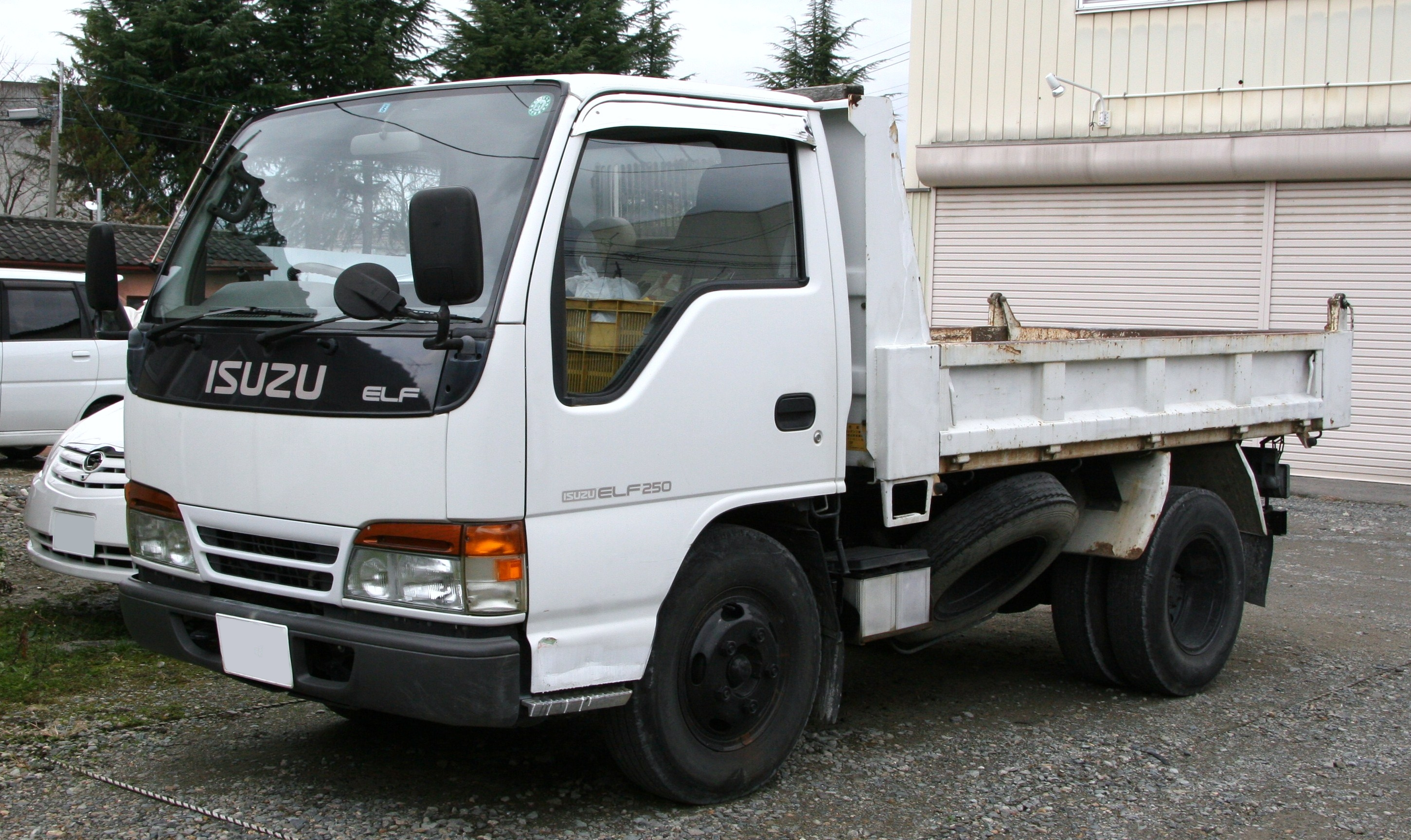
Elf 250, pre-facelift model

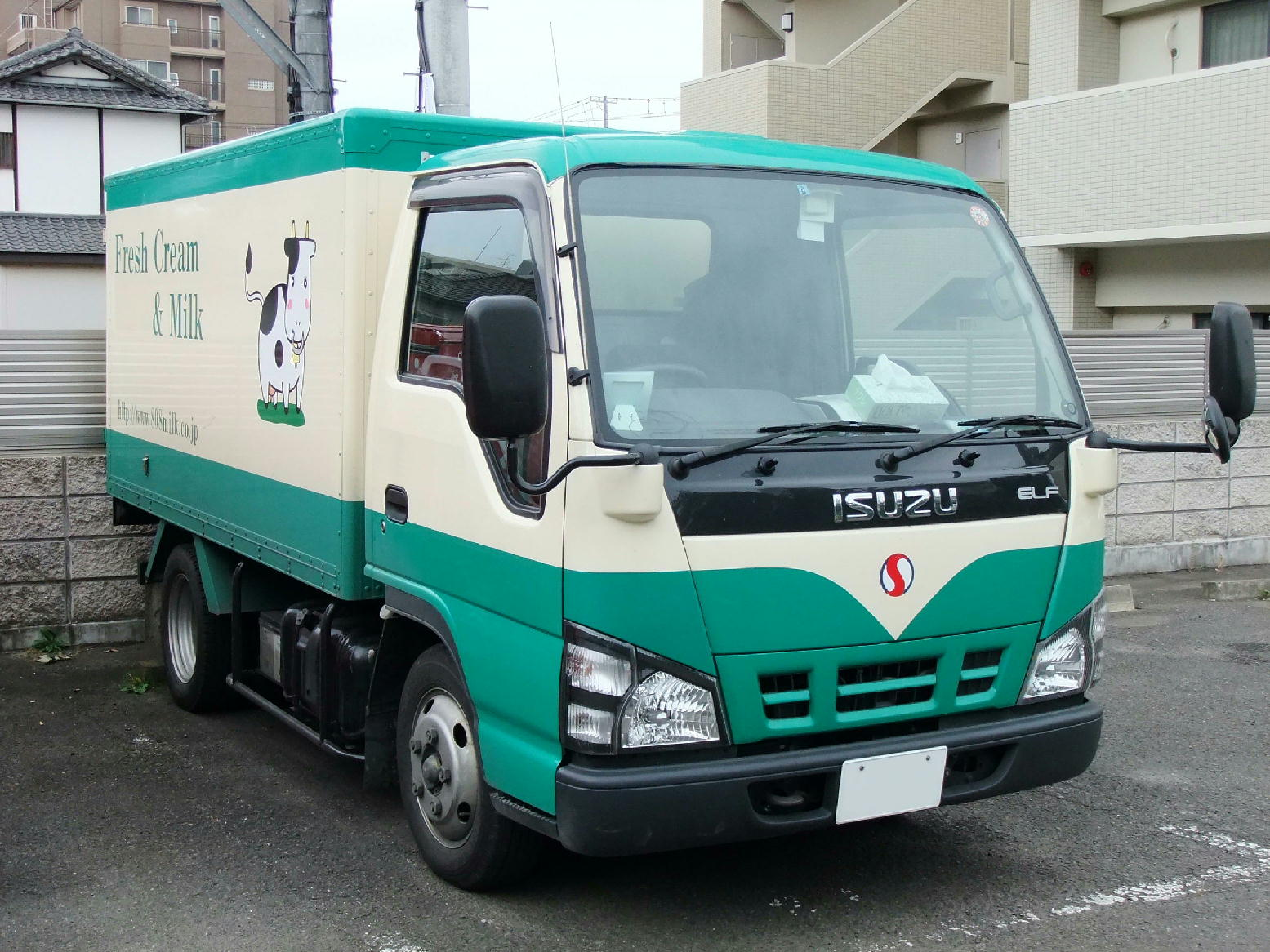
Post-facelift Isuzu Elf

The fifth generation Isuzu Elf appeared in July 1993, with more sculpted headlights. The 2.8 4JB1 and 4JB1T are standard on both Elf 150 10 ft/14 ft and Elf 250 along with 3.6 4BE1. The non-turbo 4JB1 featured a new VE Rotary injection pump which increase power to 90 PS. In May 1995 it received a minor change, including upgraded, cleaner diesel engines. The H-series 4.0-liter 4HE1 and 4.3-liter 4HF1. The 16 ft chassis with an H-series engine was standard while the 14 ft version was optional and is still in production. An OEM deal with Nissan led to the Elf also being badged as a Nissan Atlas H41/ H42 and a Nissan Diesel Condor 20/30/35 beginning at this time, followed by the Nissan Atlas Max from 1996 until 2000. The Atlas Max was based on the new, lighter-duty Elf 100 (June 1995) which was available with a 2.0-liter petrol, or a 2.5 or 2.7-liter diesel engine.

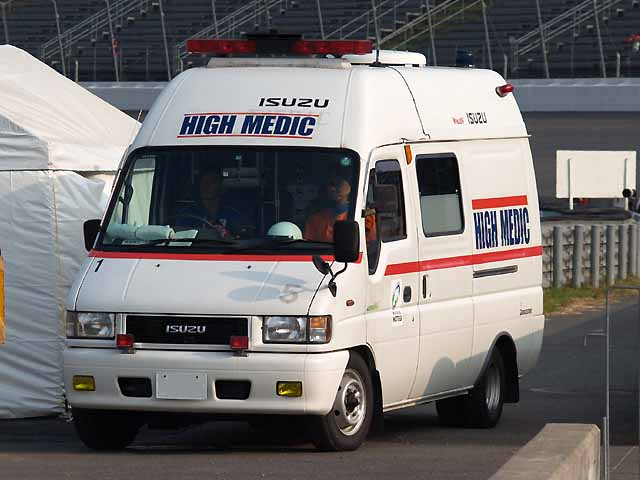
Isuzu ELF UT, ambulance variant

The bonneted version (walk through van) of Isuzu ELF also exists as Isuzu ELF UT. It was sold only in Japan. It only came with 3.1-liter 4JG2 and 4.3-liter 4HF1 engines, and available only in rear-wheel drive. Production of Isuzu ELF UT began in 1996 and ended in 2001. The ELF UT was also rebadged as Nissan Atlas Max. The successor of Isuzu ELF UT was the Isuzu Begin, which was based on the Isuzu Rodeo frame. Isuzu Begins were produced from 2001 to 2004.

In the United States, the Elf maintained the four rectangular halogen headlights from the 4th generation through 2005. 2006 and early year 2007 models had trapezoidal headlights. The Elf was marketed as the Isuzu NPR and Chevrolet/GMC W series, each available with either the 4BD2T 3.9-liter turbo-diesel engine until 1998, the 4HE1 4.8-liter turbo-diesel engine from 1998 to 2004, the 4HK1 5.2-liter turbo-diesel engine from 2005. It then became available with GM's 5.7-liter L31 Vortec or GM's 6.0-liter LQ4 Vortec engine with 4L80-E automatic transmission. The 5.7-liter engine was rated at 275 to 325 hp (205 to 242 kW) at 4,600 rpm and 330 to 350 lb⋅ft (447 to 475 N⋅m) of torque at 2,800 rpm. The 6.0-liter engine was rated at 300 to 325 hp (224 to 242 kW) at 4,400 rpm and 358 to 370 lb⋅ft (485 to 502 N⋅m) of torque at 2,800 rpm.

In May 2004, subsequent to a few minor changes, the Elf underwent a major facelift with new and larger trapezoidal headlamps. Another OEM deal was forged at this time and the Elf was now also marketed as the Mazda Titan in parallel.

In Malaysia, this truck is manufactured by Heavy Industries Corporation of Malaysia (Isuzu HICOM Malaysia) under the name of HICOM Perkasa, but carrying the Isuzu N-Series Commando badge. It was introduced in 1996 and discontinued in 2011, 15 years after its inception.

== Sixth generation ==
The sixth generation Elf/N series was introduced in December 2006 (High Cab and Wide Cab) and February 2007 (Regular Cab). By the time the full range was available, the fifth generation Elf was retired. This was also assembled in Colombia (alongside the heavier F series), where it was sold as the Chevrolet NKR, NPR, or NQR. The sixth generation model was also rebadged as the Nissan Atlas H43 in Japan.

The engines are the all new, 3-litre 4JJ1 engine making 150 PS (110 kW) in the NJR and NPR models while the NQR uses the 5.2-litre 4HK1 engine.

The headlight-turnsignal cluster is now configured in the shape of the Isuzu "twin bar" logo, which was used from 1974 to 1991. In North America, GM sold the Isuzu N series as the Chevrolet and GMC W-Series until 2009. In 2016, it reintroduced the model as the Low Cab Forward (LCF) series, named simply the Chevrolet 3500, 4500, or 5500, and available with the same gasoline or diesel engines.

The sixth generation was introduced in Malaysia in 2014. It is sold as the Isuzu Grafter in the United Kingdom and some other European markets.

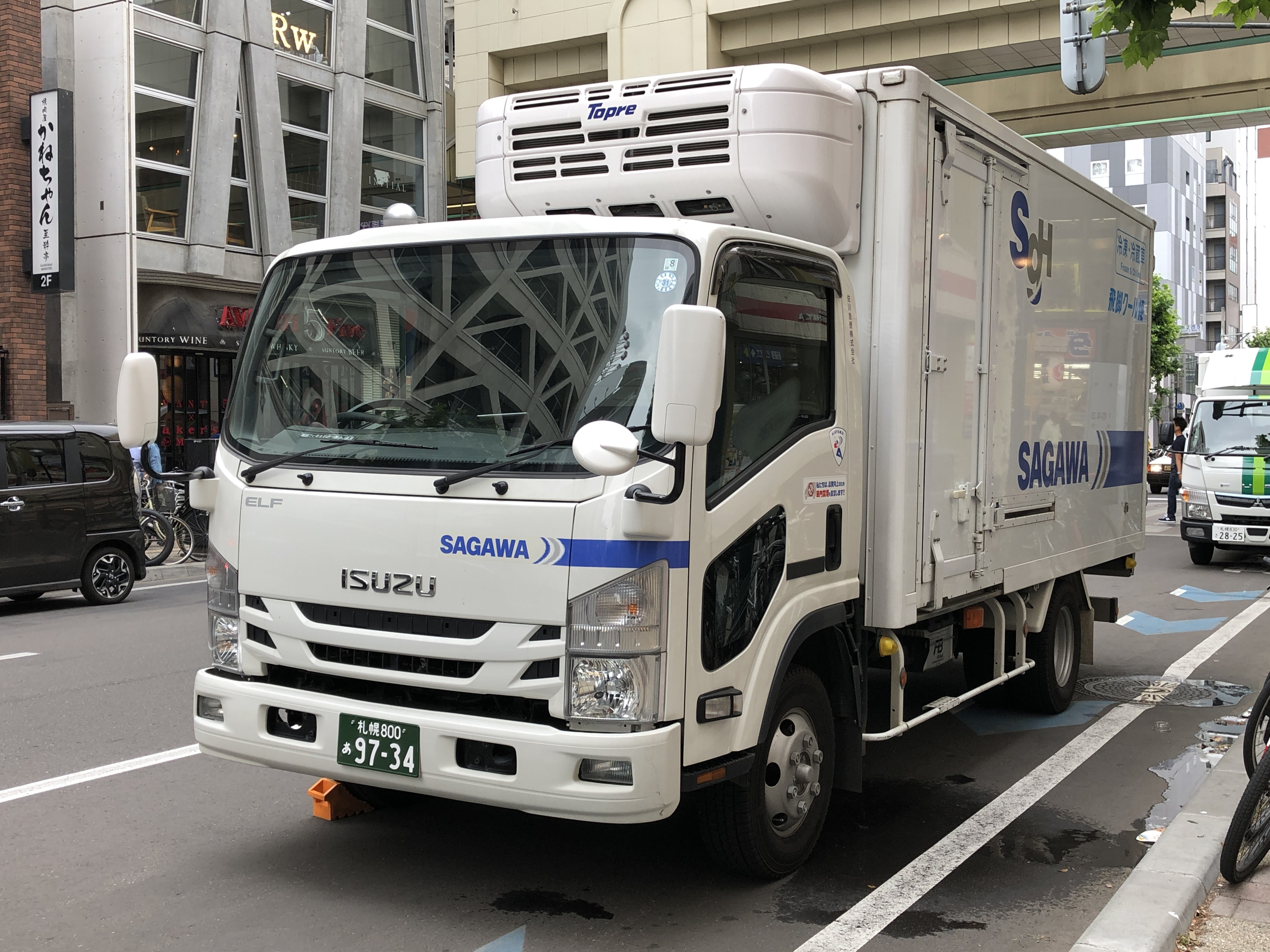
Isuzu Elf Delivery Truck

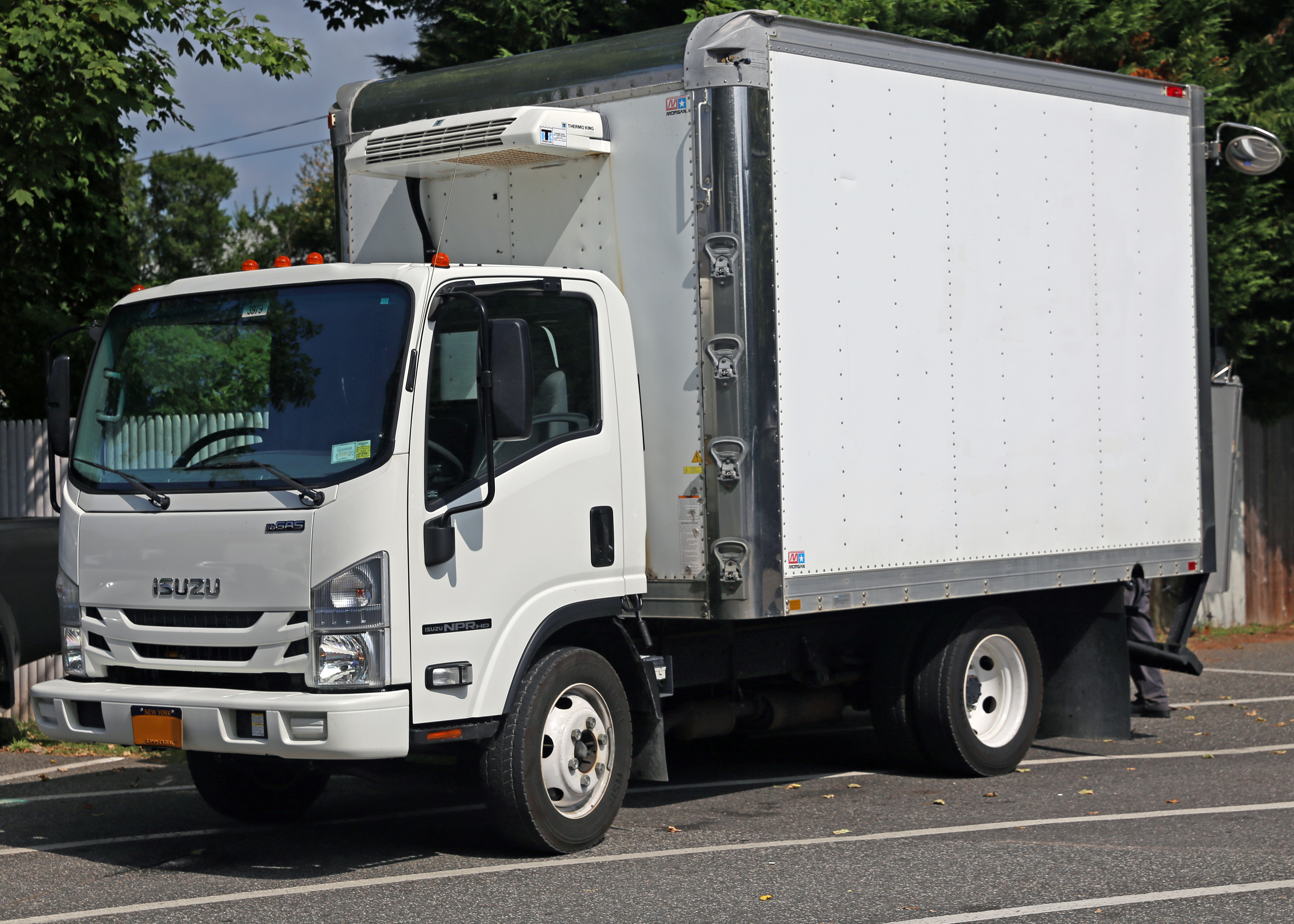
Isuzu NPR (US)

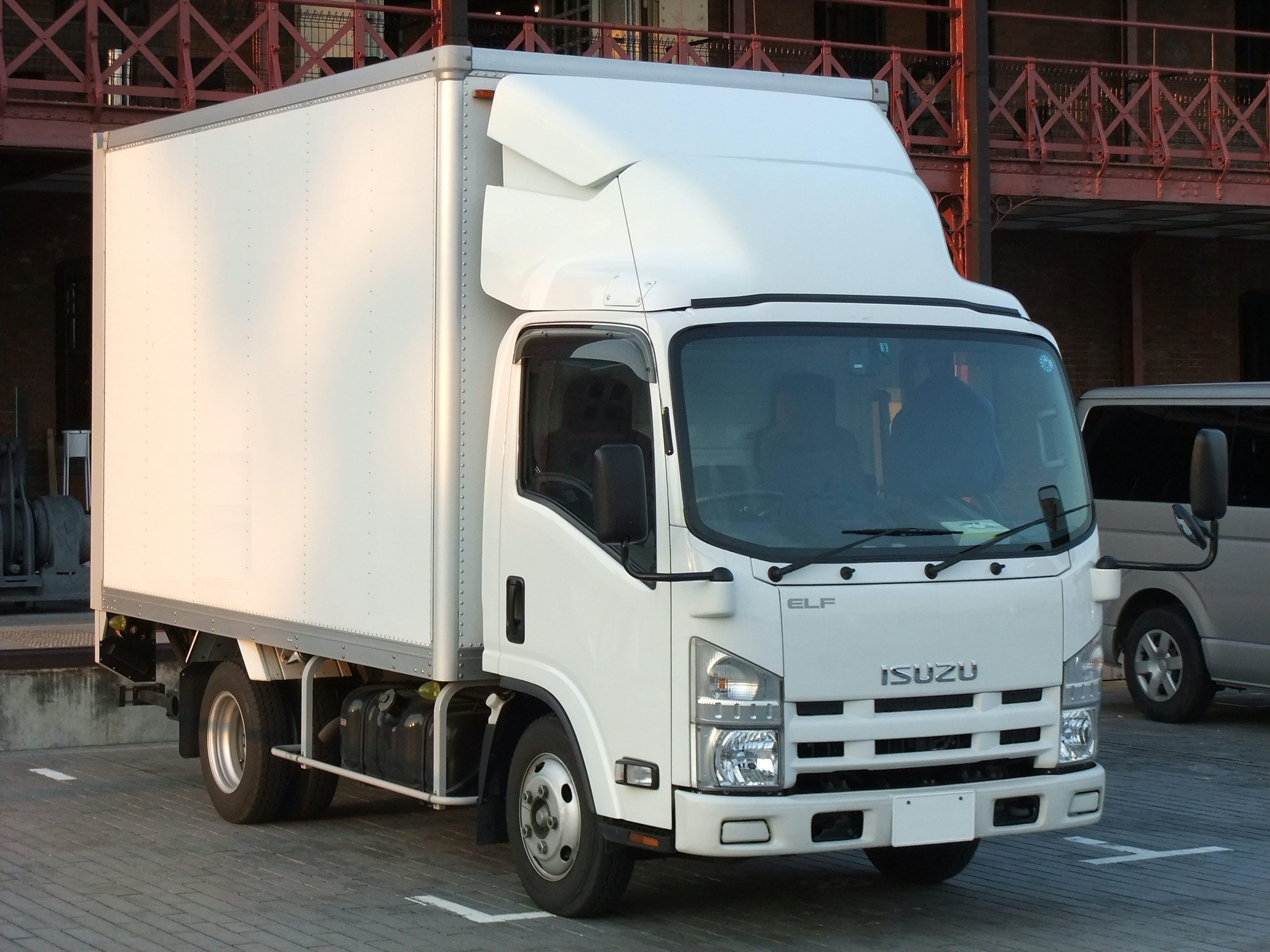
Isuzu Elf Hi-cab box truck

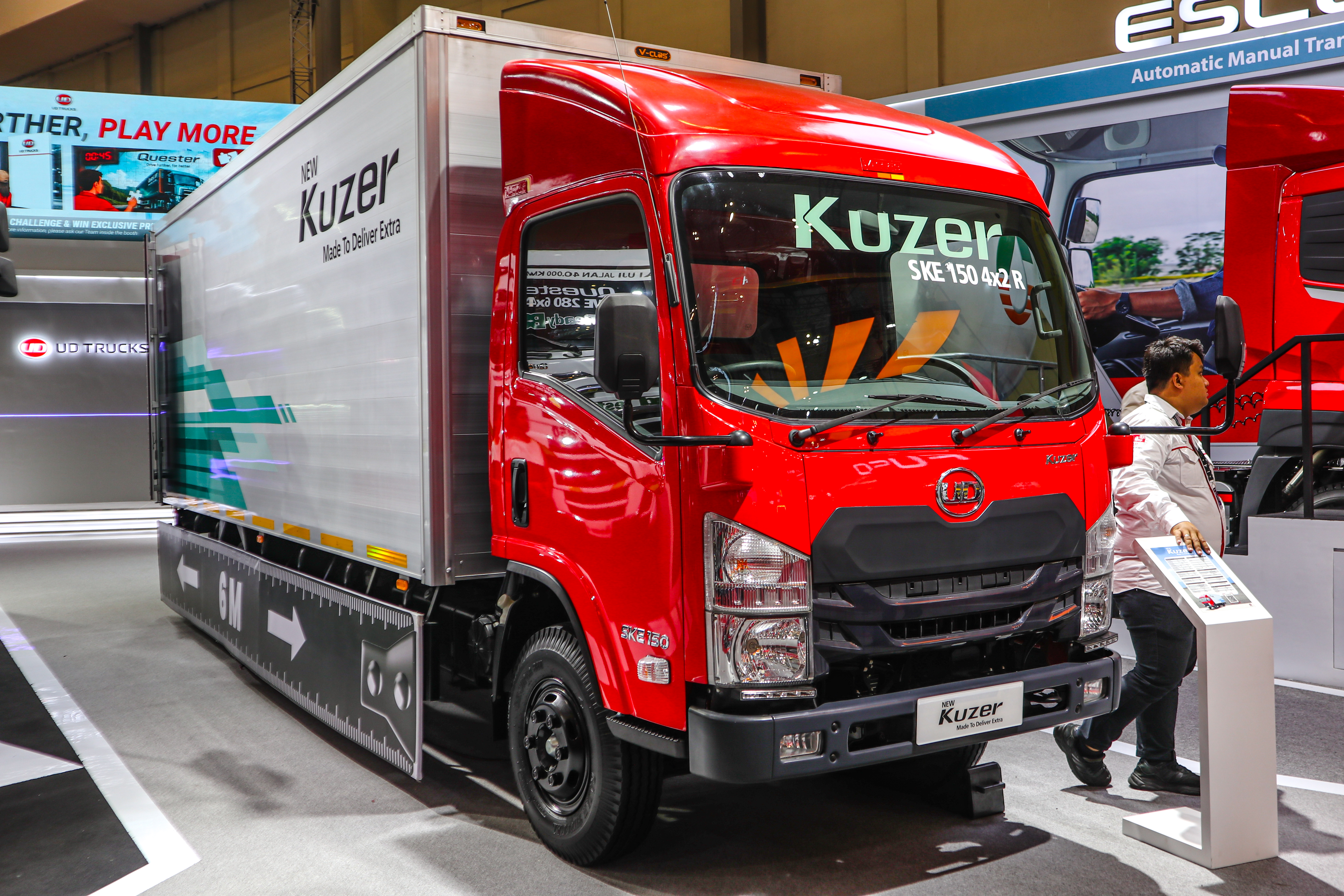
UD Kuzer SKE 150

== Seventh generation ==
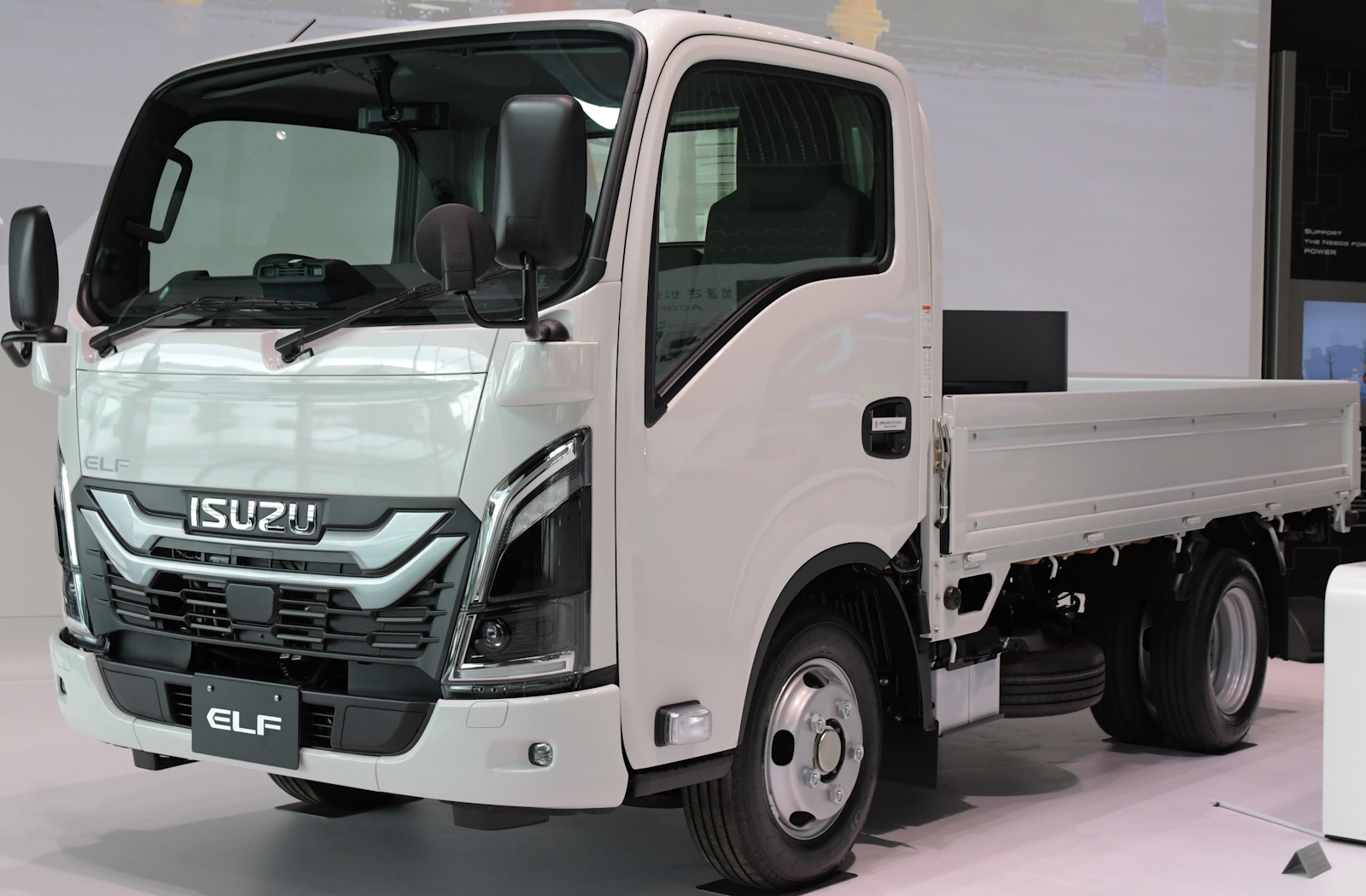
Isuzu Elf

The seventh generation Elf/N series was presented on March 7, 2023 in Japan, now with an EV version available.

In July 2024, a new 1.5-tonne version was presented, called the Elf Mio. This lighter duty model is powered by a 1.9-liter turbodiesel engine and measures under 4.7 m (185.0 in) long and 1.7 m (66.9 in) wide, meaning that it qualifies as a compact vehicle. Thus, it can be driven on a regular license, and the automatic may be driven by people who have not passed the manual transmission driving test in Japan. The arrival of the seventh generation Elf also marked the introduction of a rebadged sister model from UD Trucks, named Kazet.

== Light duty version (Elf 100) ==
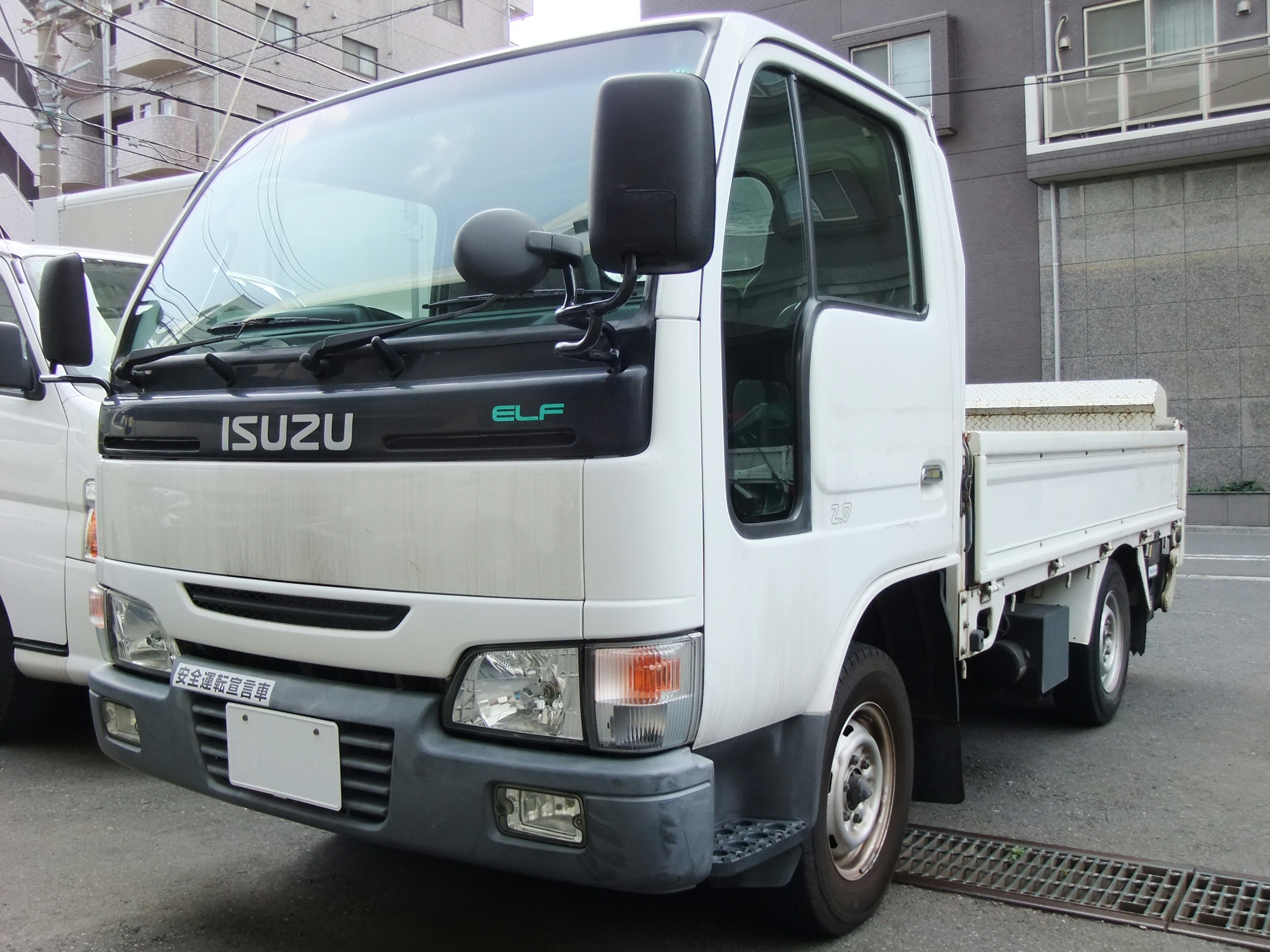
Isuzu Elf 100 based on the second generation Nissan Atlas

The Elf 100 was introduced in mid-1995. Unlike the regular Elf, It is a OEM-supplied by Nissan. It was the direct successor to the Isuzu Fargo Truck, which was discontinued in that year.

In July 2007, the second generation Elf 100 was launched in 2007. There is no difference with the F24 Atlas other than Isuzu's emblem.

Sales of the Elf 100 were discontinued in early 2021. The Elf Mio, released in 2024, is its direct successor.

== Nomenclature ==
The branding is Elf in its home market of Japan and some others including Mexico and Indonesia.

In most markets however, it is known as the N-Series.

The second letter denotes weight rating,

H, L, K = regular cab. M = high cab. P, Q, R = wide cab.

The third letter denotes drivetrain layout;

R = rear-wheel drive. S = four-wheel drive.

The Elf is sold as an Elf in some markets aside from the domestic Japanese, such as Mexico and Indonesia, but in most export markets it is called the Isuzu N series and Q Series.

== See also ==
- Isuzu Forward
- Isuzu Giga
- List of Isuzu engines
- List of low cab forward trucks
- Wienermobile
- Wrightspeed
- Chevrolet Silverado

== Works cited ==
- Ishikawa, Kenji (1 May 2012), トラックメーカーアーカイブ: いすゞ自動車のすべて [Truck Manufacturer Archive: Everything Isuzu], Camion (in Japanese), Tokyo, Japan: Geibun Mooks, ISBN 978-4-86396-183-8
