= Hino Rainbow =

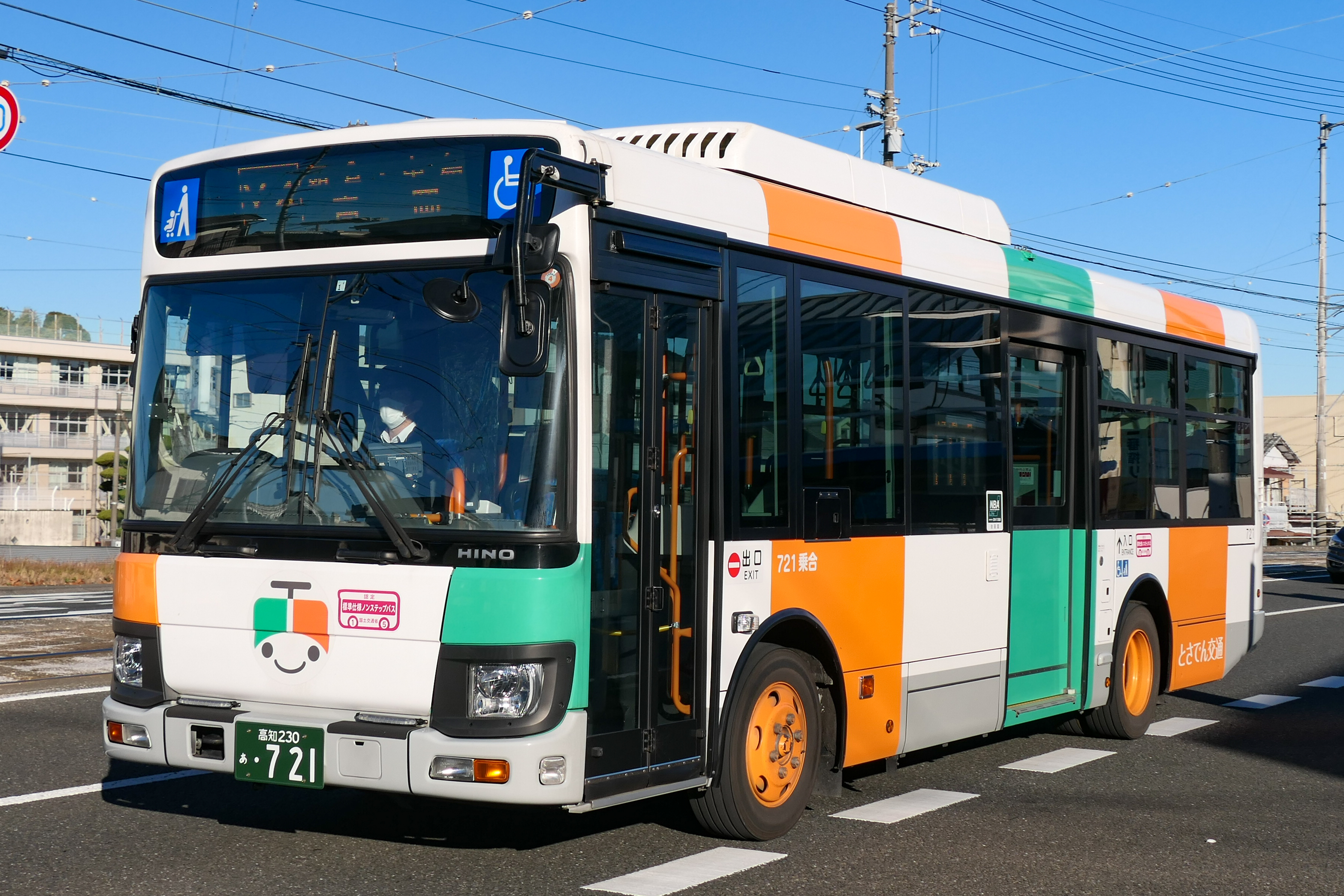

Overview
- Manufacturer: J-Bus
- Also called: Isuzu Erga Mio
- Production: 1970–present

Body and chassis
- Class: Complete bus Bus chassis
- Body style: Single-decker bus Single-decker coach
- Doors: 1 door or 2 doors
- Floor type: Step-entrance; Low floor Low entry
- Related: Isuzu Erga-J; Isuzu Erga Mio; Isuzu Gala Mio

Powertrain
- Transmission: 5-speed manual 6-speed manual 3-speed automatic (7M/7W/RB/AB); 5-speed automatic (RJ/RR/HR/II)

Dimensions
- Length: 7.0 to 10.5 metres
- Width: 2.0 to 2.5 metres
- Height: 3.0 metres

Chronology
- Predecessor: Hino RL
- Successor: Hino Liesse; Hino Melpha (Tourist coach)

The Hino Rainbow (kana:日野・レインボー) is a medium-duty single-decker bus marketed by the Japanese manufacturer Hino since 1980. The range can be built as either a complete bus or a bus chassis. It was also available for the city bus for the midibus and the tourist coach for the minibus. Asia Motors (now Kia Motors) released as a badge engineered version in South Korea called the Cosmos. It is built by J-Bus.

== RL (1970–1980) ==
- RL100 (1970)
- RL300/320 (1975)
- K-RL301/321 (1980)
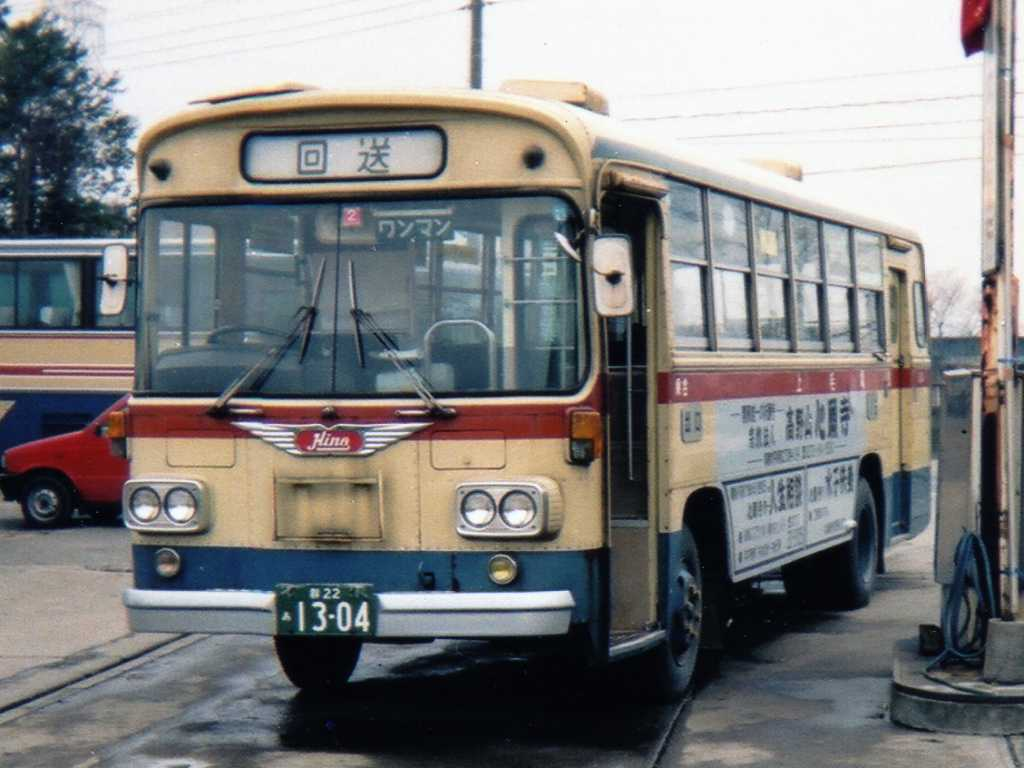
K-RL321

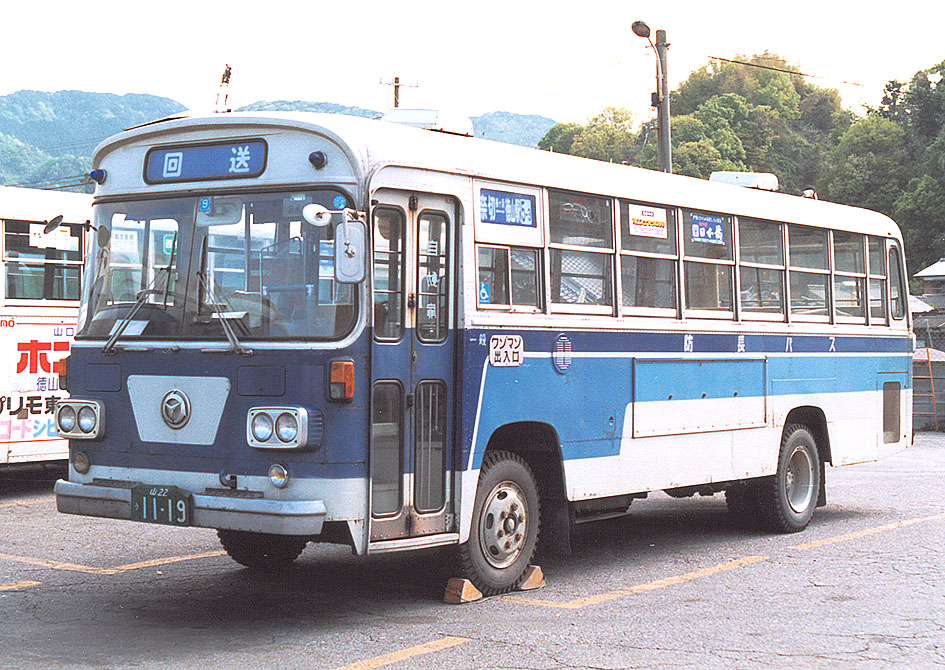
RL320

== Rainbow RJ/RR (1980–2004) ==
- First generation (1980–1988)
  - K-RJ/RR170/172/192 (1980)
  - P-RJ/RR170/172/192 (1984)
- Second generation (1988–2004)
  - P-RJ/RR170/172/192 (1988)
  - U-RR2HGAA (1990)
  - U-RJ/RR3H (1990)
  - KC-RJ/RR1J (1995)
  - KK-RJ/RR1J (1999)
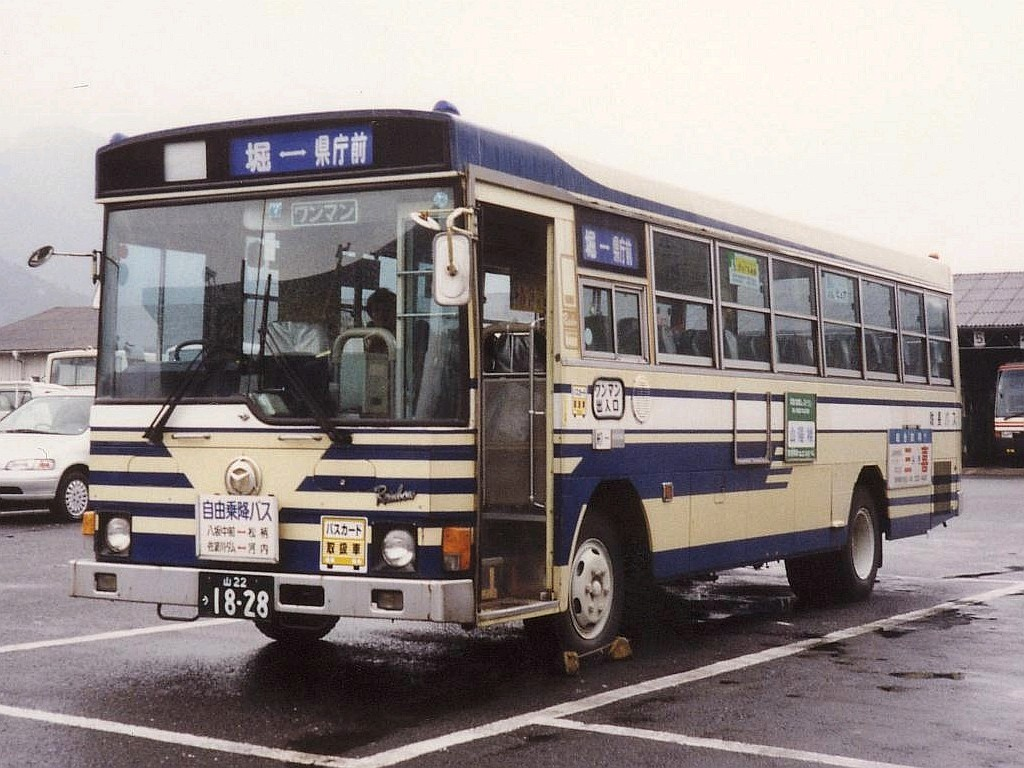
Rainbow RJ (1st) K-RJ172BA

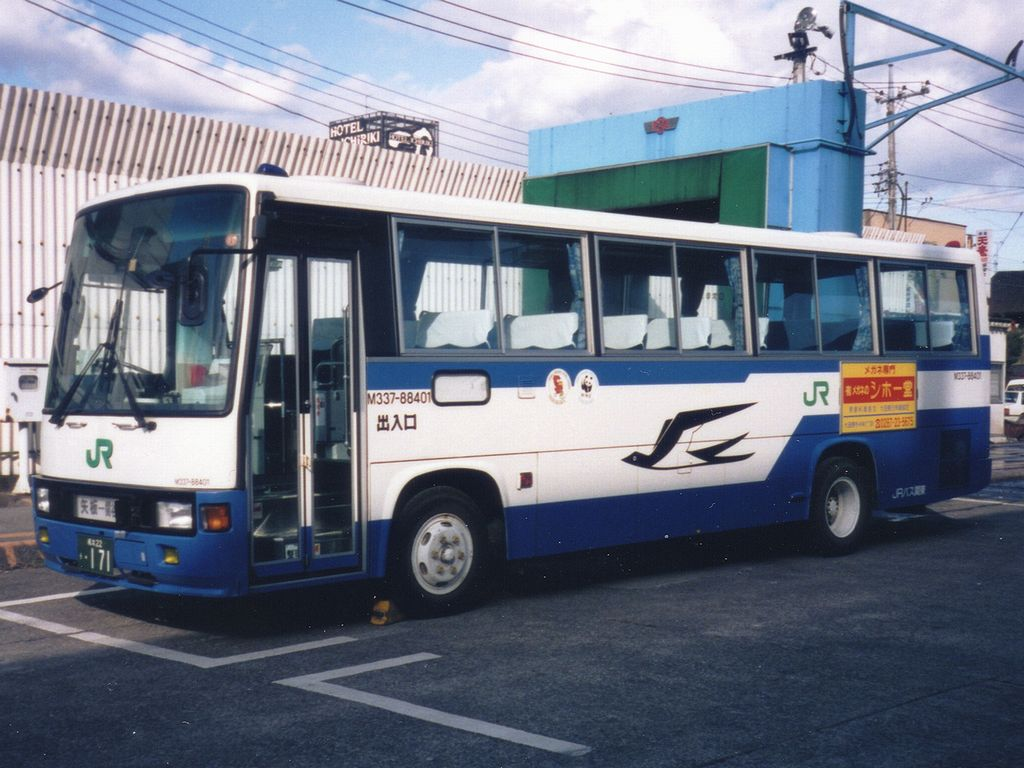
Rainbow RR (2nd) P-RR192CA

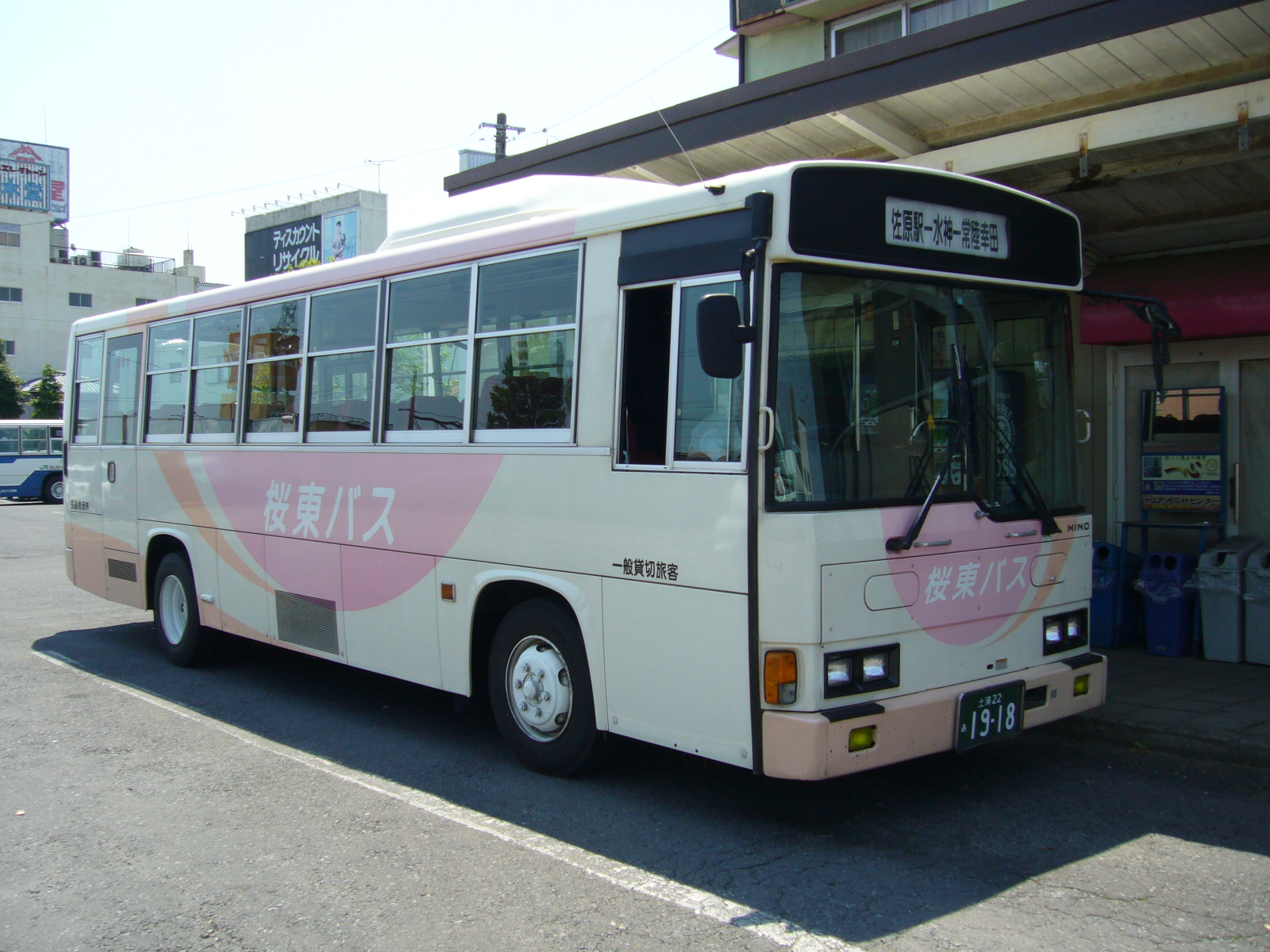
Rainbow RJ (2nd) KC-RJ1JJAA

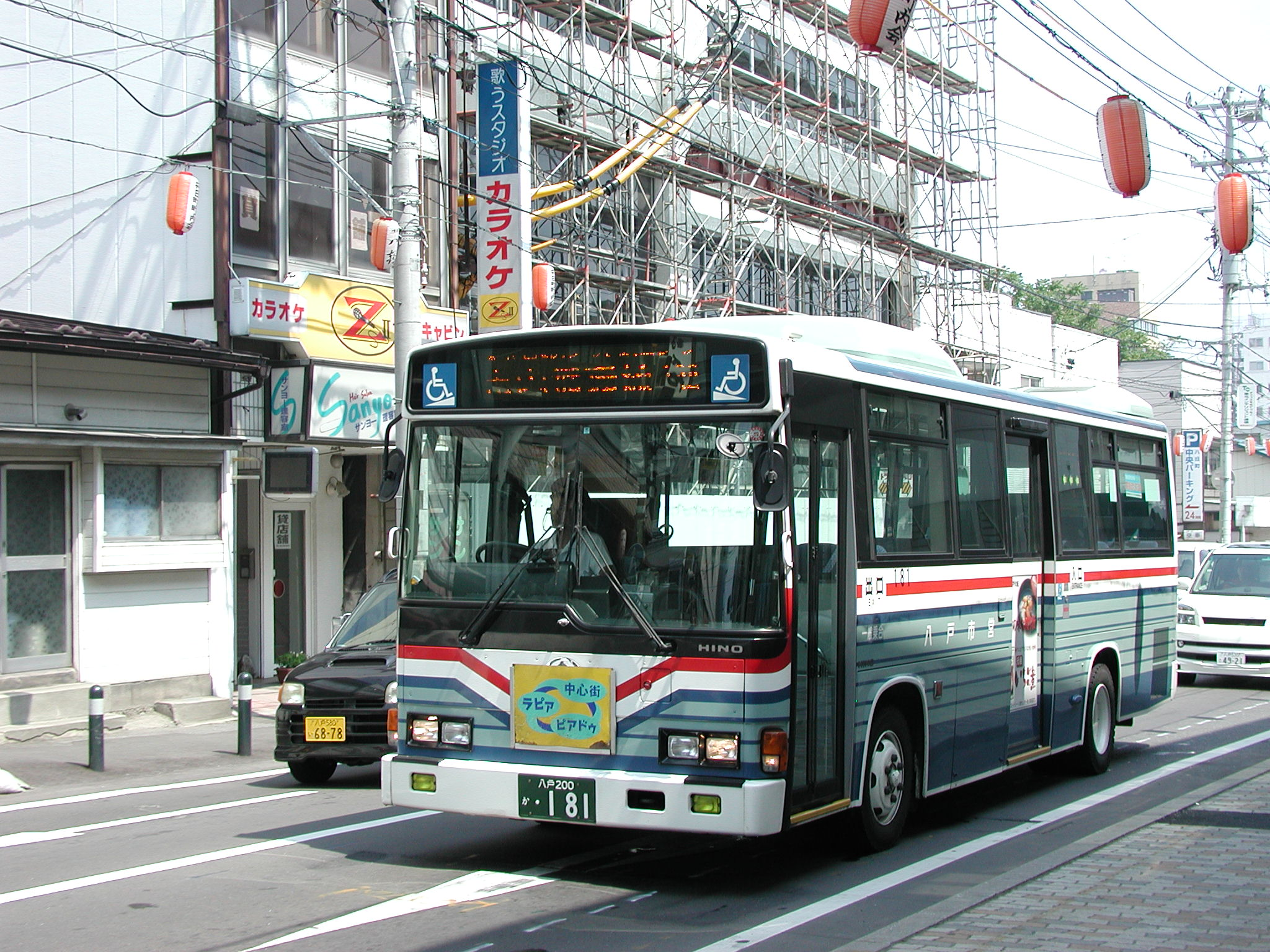
Rainbow RJ (2nd) KK-RJ1JJHK

== Rainbow AM (1976–1983) ==
- AM100 (1976)
- K-AM101 (1980)
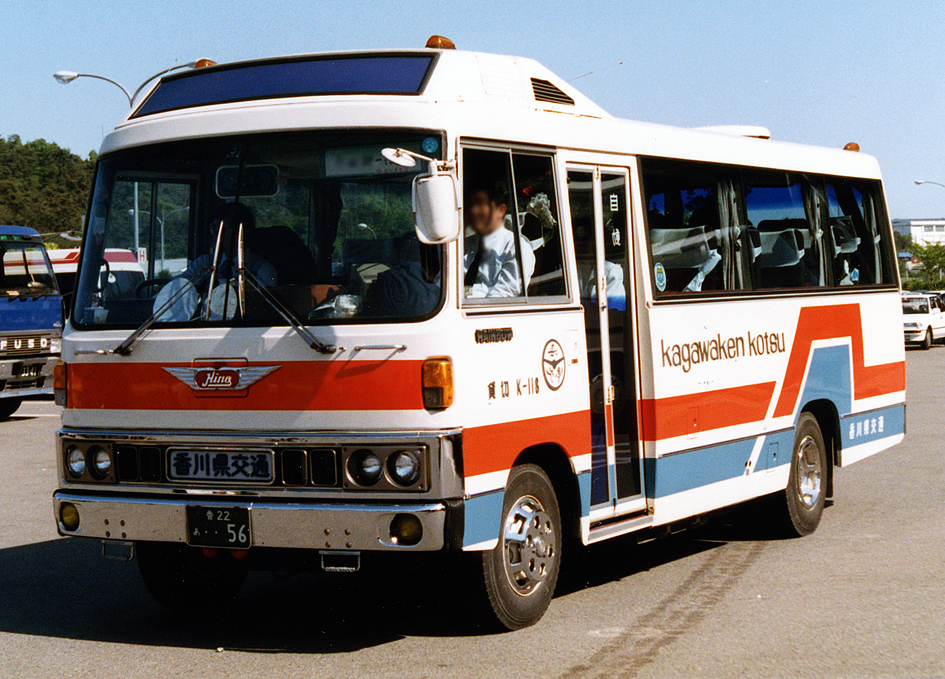
Rainbow AM K-AM101

== Rainbow AC (1983–1988) ==
- P-AC140 (1983)
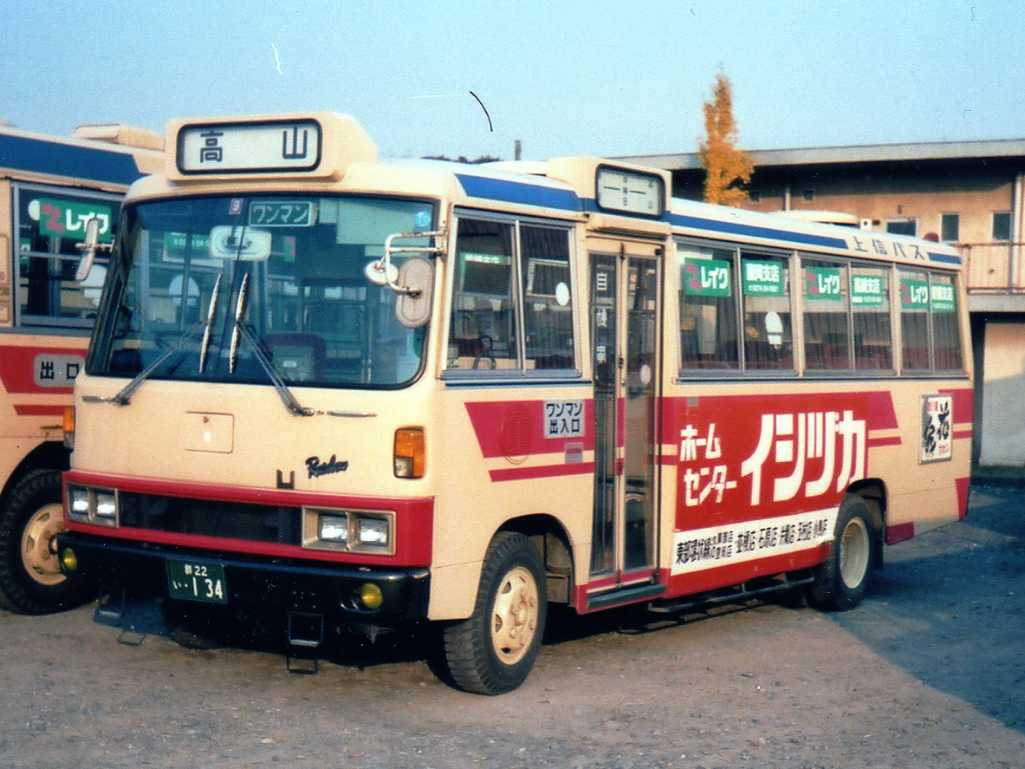
Rainbow AC P-AC140AA

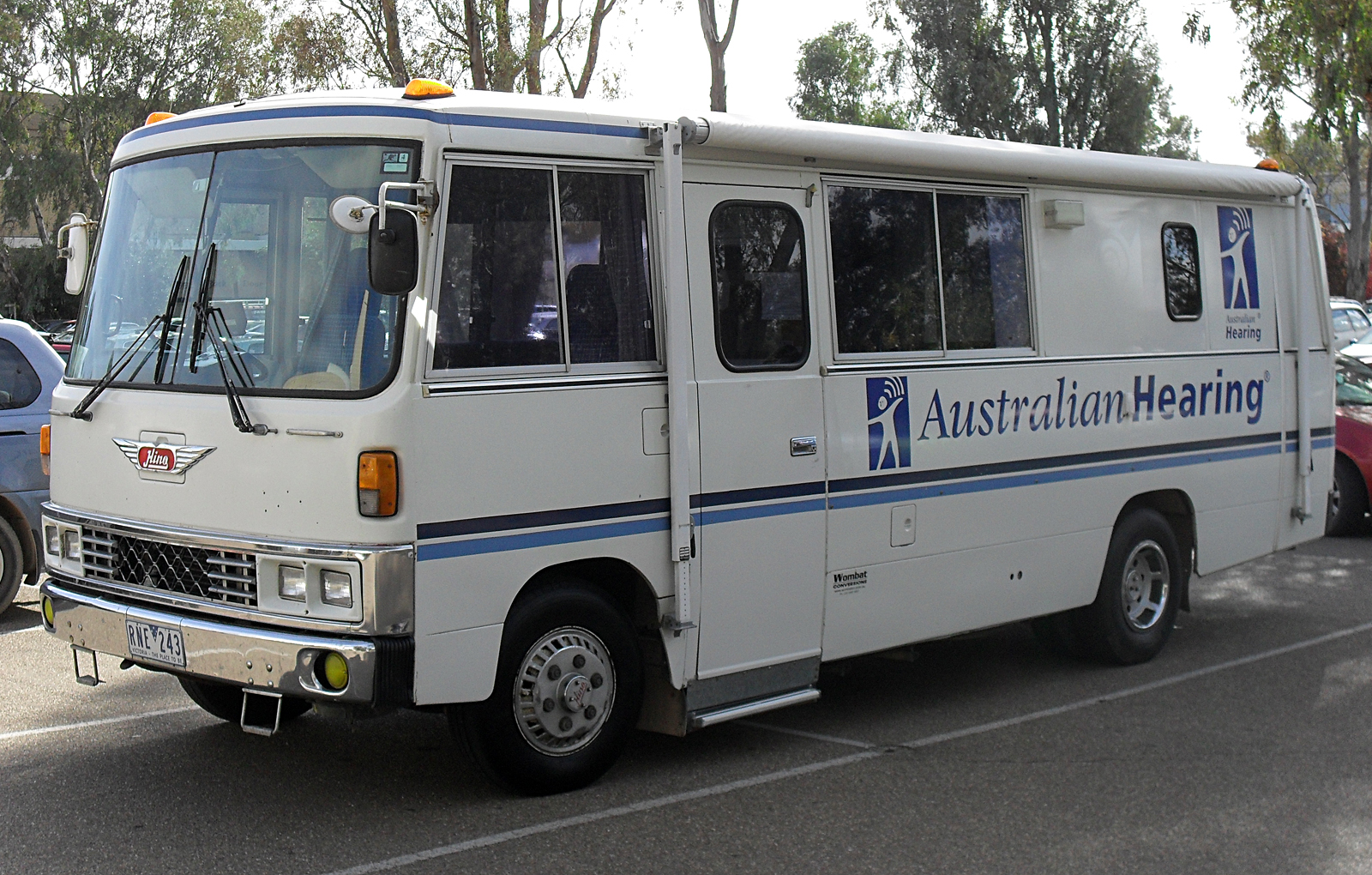
Rainbow AC

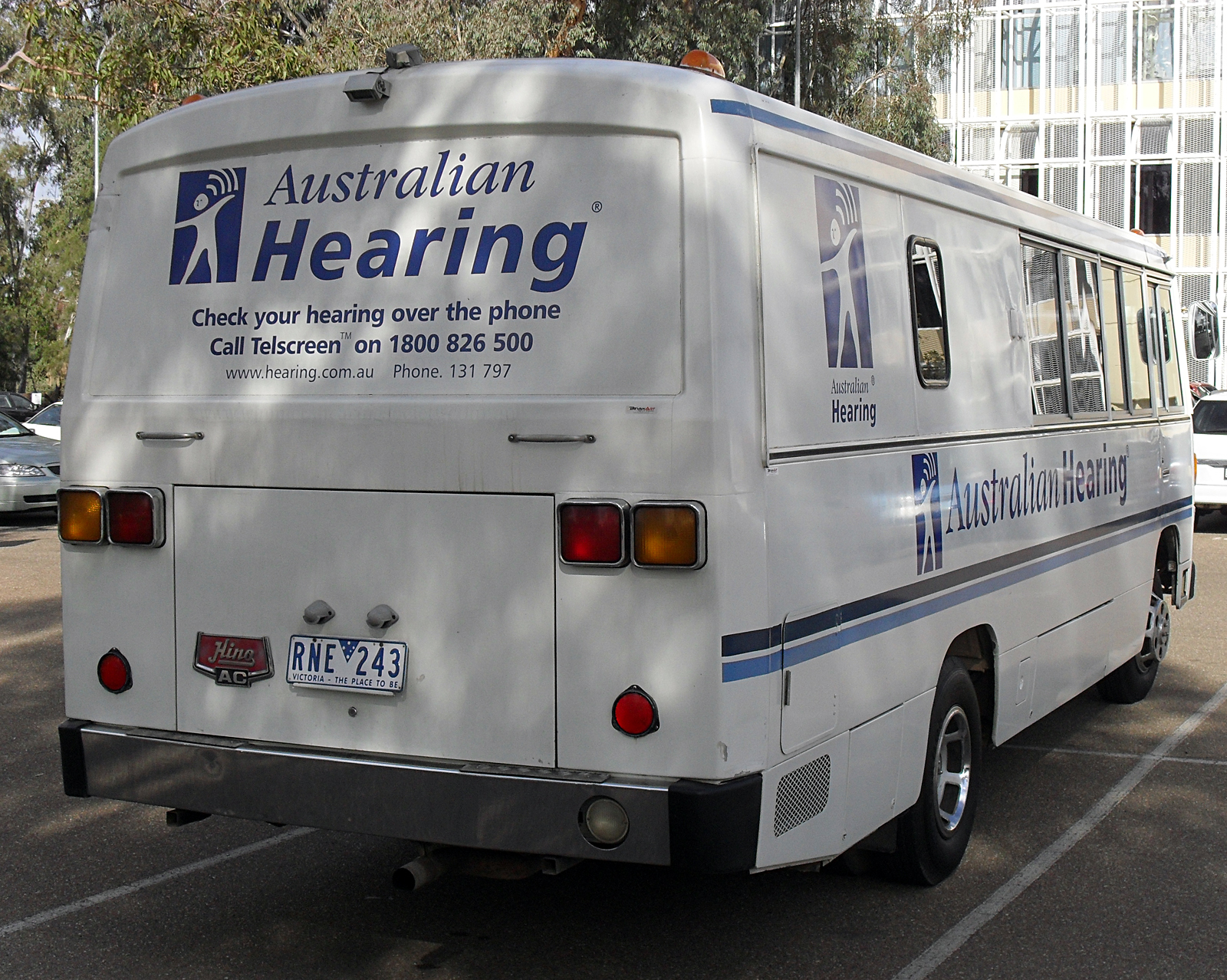
Rainbow AC

== Rainbow RB/AB (1985–1995) ==
The Rainbow RB (rear engine)/AB (front engine) was a minibus that was built as the tourist coach.

- P-RB145/AB115 (1985)
- U-RB1W/AB2W (1990)
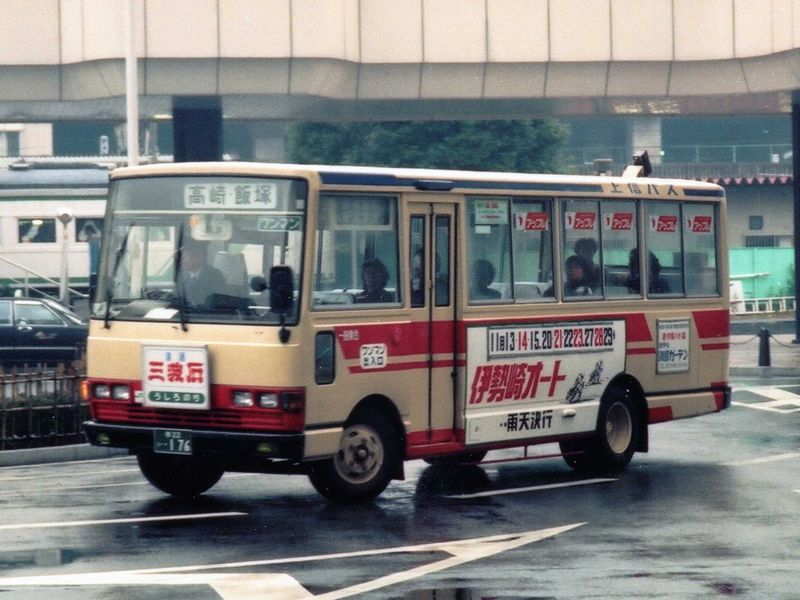
Rainbow RB P-RB115AA

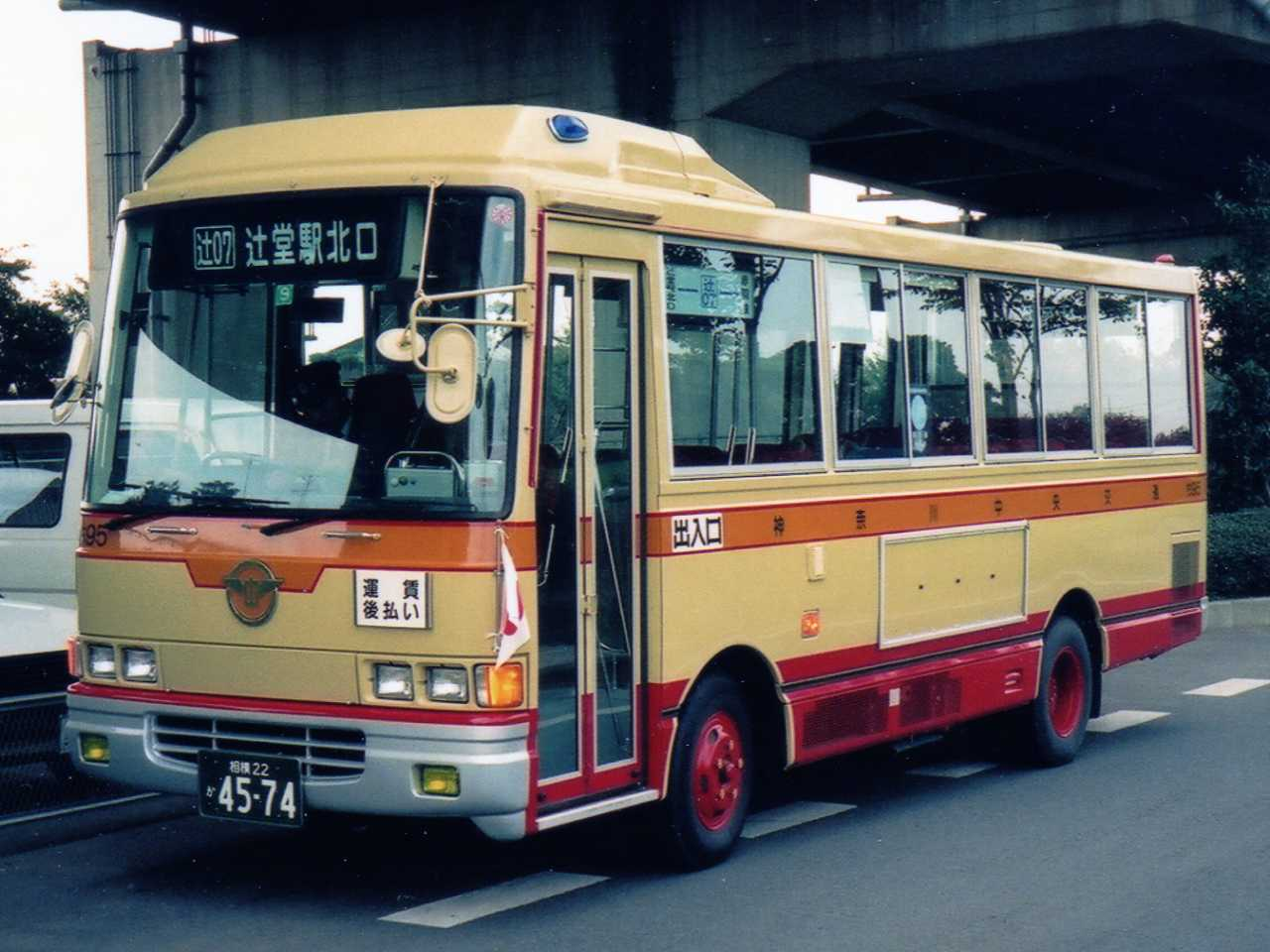
Rainbow RB U-RB1WEAA

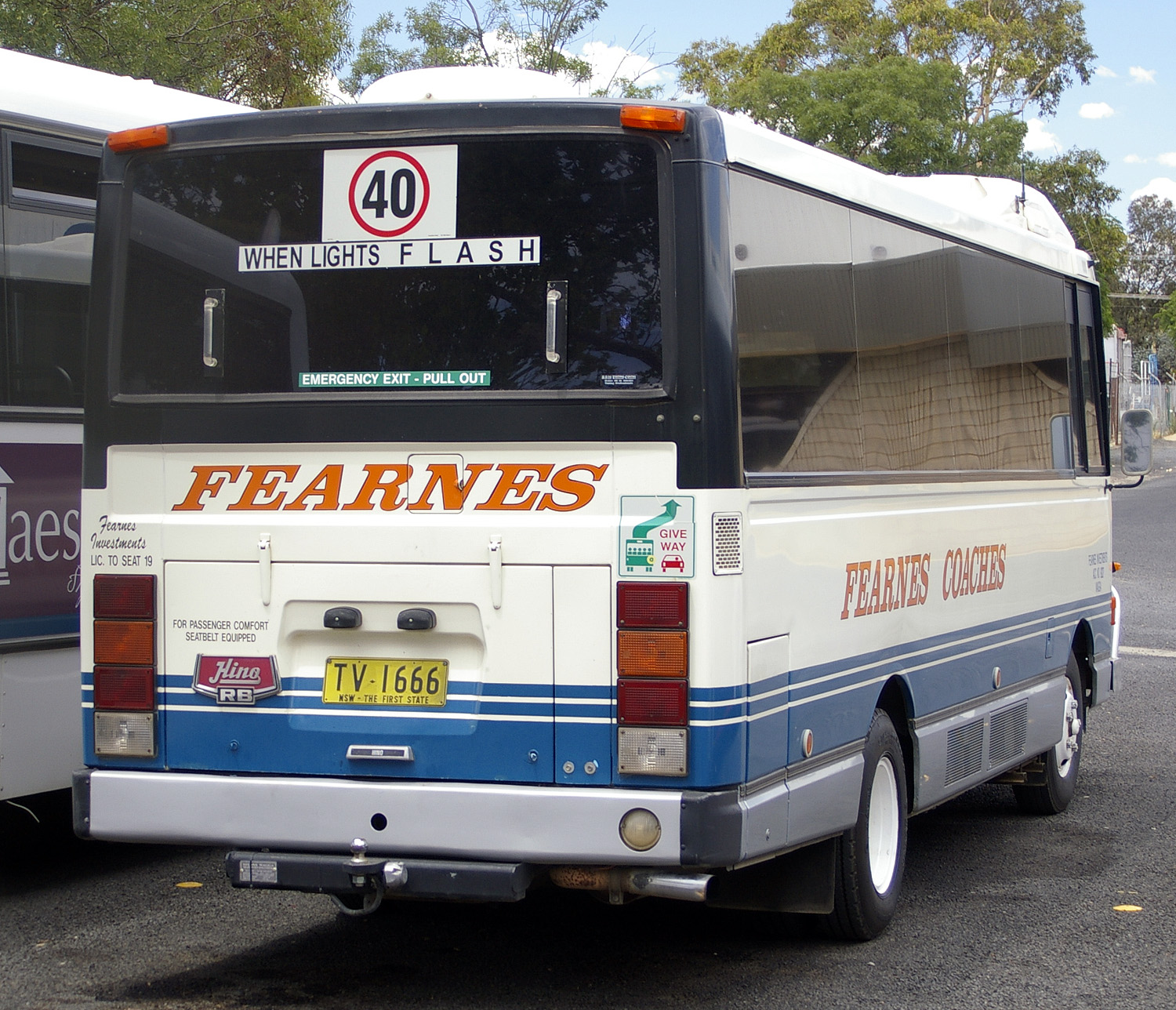
Rainbow RB used by Fearnes Coaches.

== Rainbow 7M(CH)/7W(RH) (1987–1998) ==
- P-CH/RH160 (1987)
- U-CH/RH3 (1990)
- KC-CH/RH1 (1995)
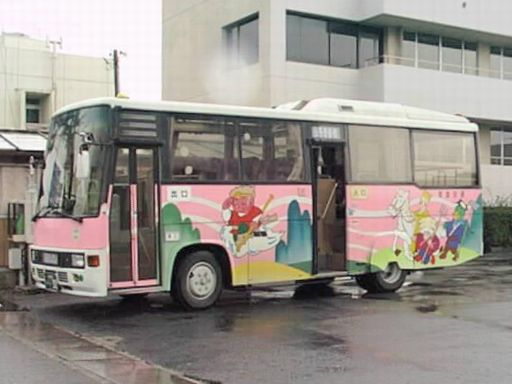
Rainbow 7M P-CH160AA (modified)

== Rainbow HR (1999–2010) ==
The Rainbow HR was a rebadged Isuzu Erga-J and a non-step (low-entry) city bus. The HR1J engine is J08C 220ps 6-cylinder 8-litre diesel engine. The HR7J engines J07E 225ps 5-cylinder 7-litre diesel engine with a turbocharger and intercooler.

- KK-HR1J (1999) - 7m/9m
- KL-HR1J (2000) - 10.5m
- PB-HR7J (2004) - 9m
- PK-HR7J (2004) - 10.5m
- BDG-HR7J (2007) - 10.5m
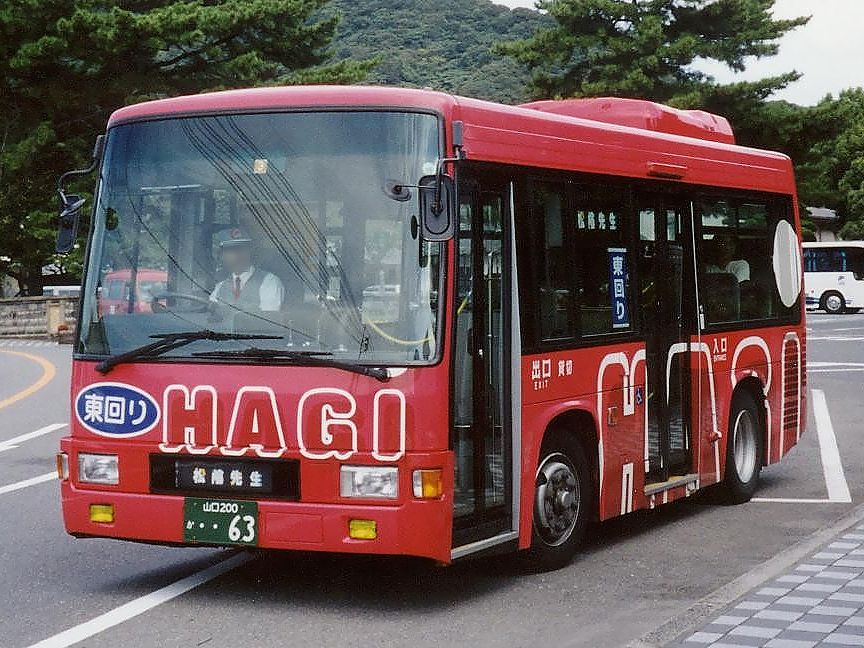
Rainbow HR 7m KK-HR1JEEE

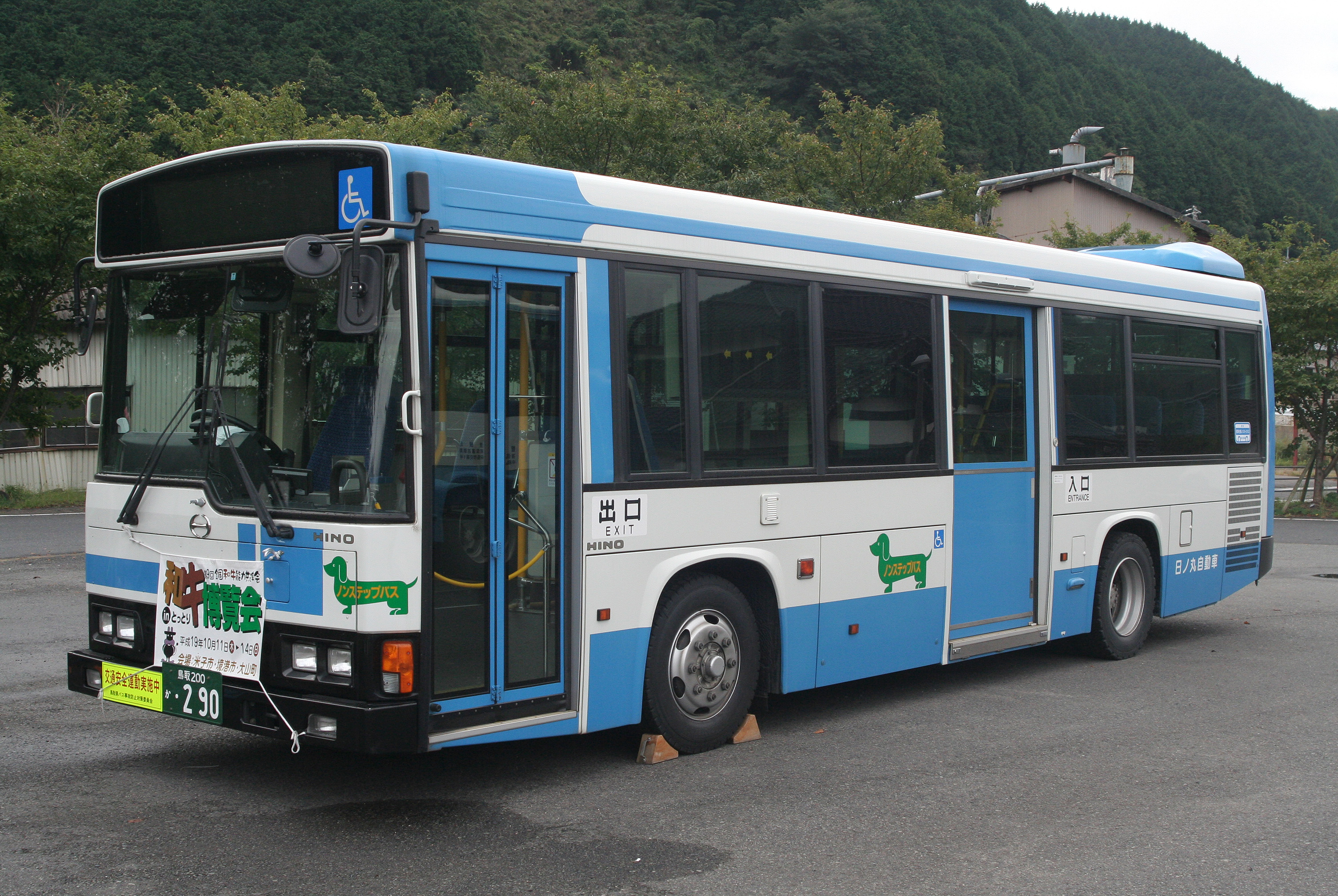
Rainbow HR 9m PB-HR7JHAE

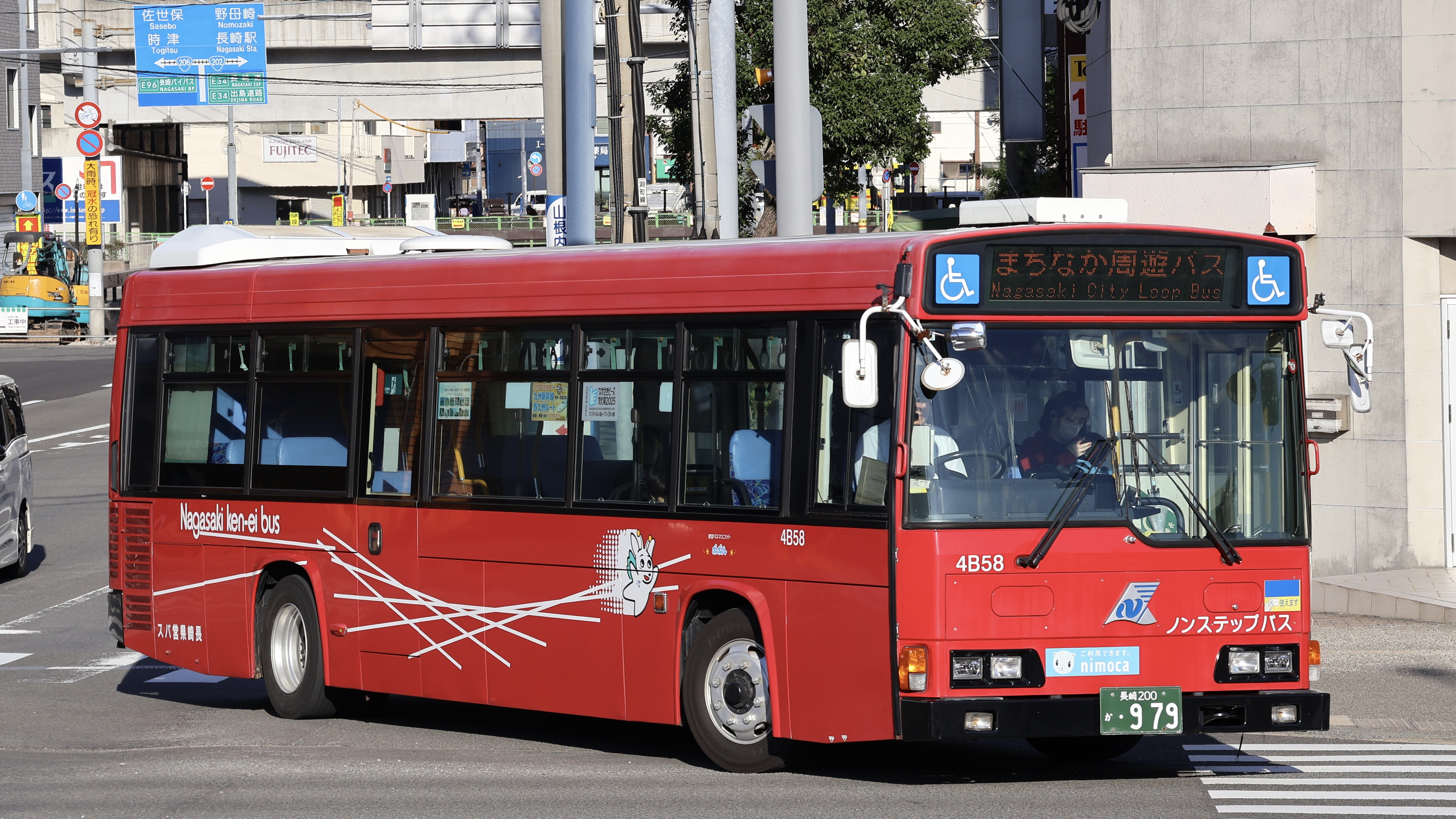
Rainbow HR 10.5m KL-HR1JNEE

== Rainbow II (2004–2016) ==
The Rainbow II is a rebadged Isuzu Erga Mio. It is most common available in non-step (low-floor) city buses and they have a rounded roof dome (more rounded than the Rainbow HR) with a double-curvature windscreen and a separately mounted destination blind.

- PA-KR234J1 (2004)
- PDG-KR234J2 (2007)
- SDG-KR290J1 (2011)
- SKG-KR290J1 (2012)
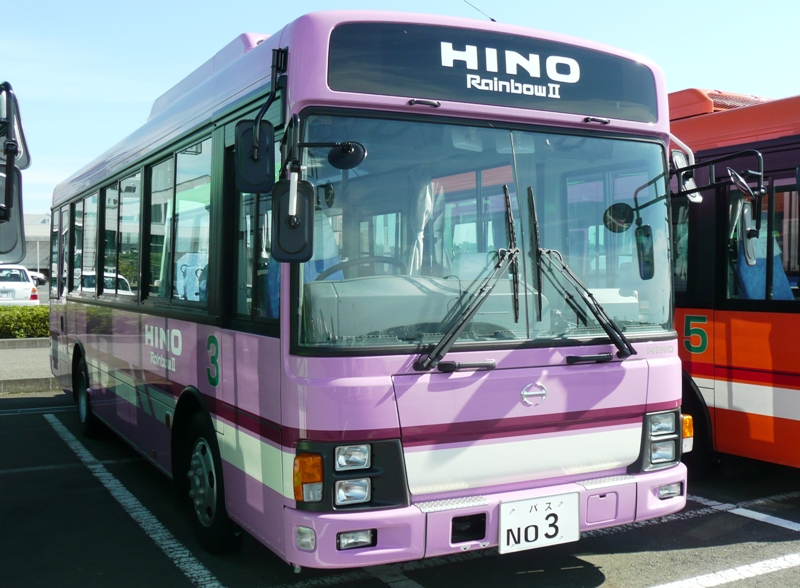
Rainbow II (Instruction car)

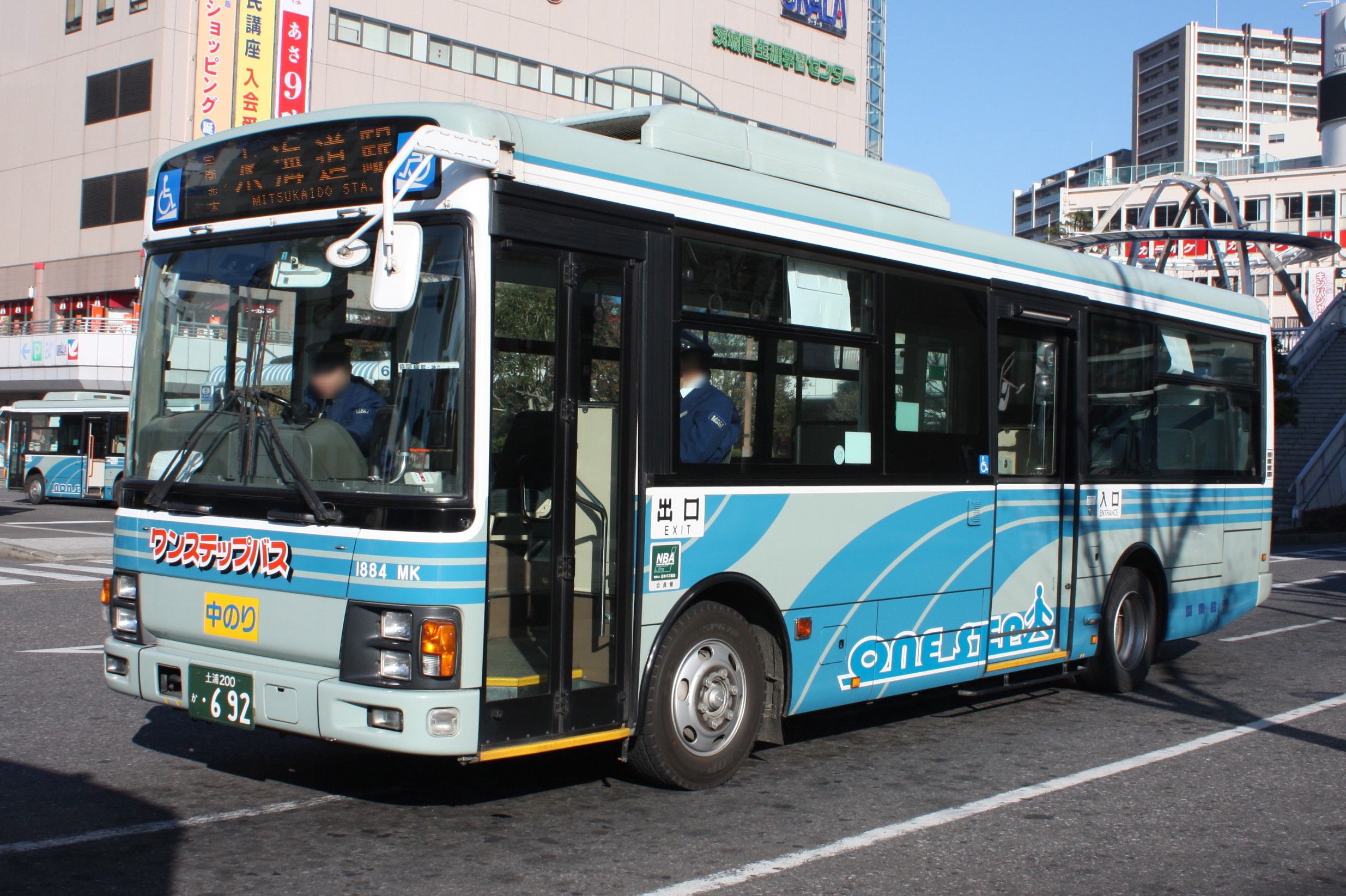
Rainbow II One Step PA-KR234J1

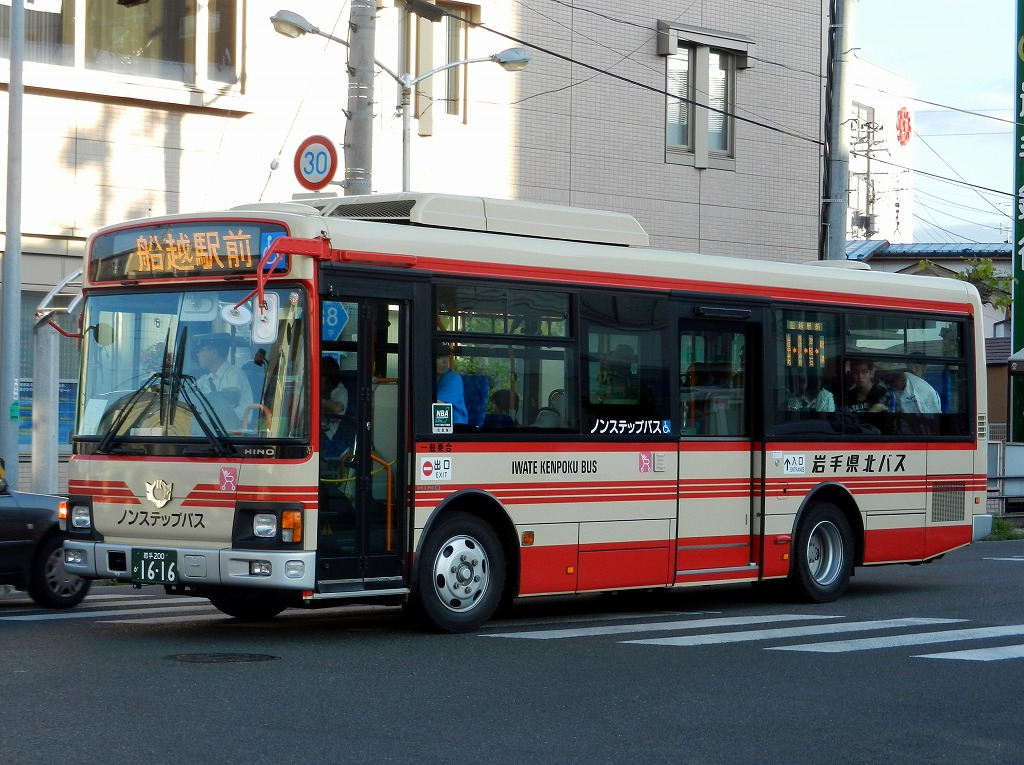
Rainbow II Non Step PDG-KR234J2

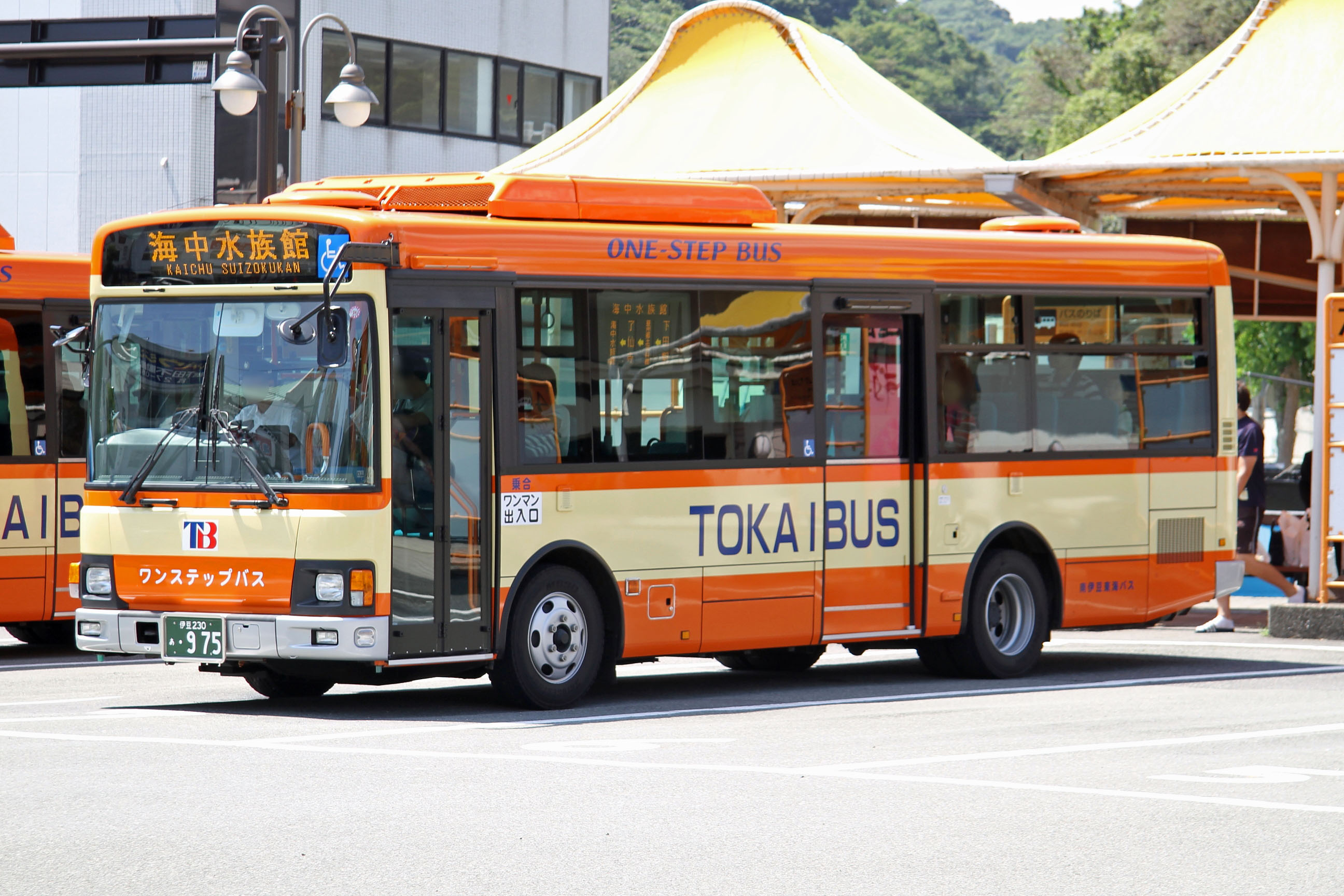
Rainbow II One Step SDG-KR290J1

== Rainbow (2016–present) ==
The Rainbow is a rebadged Isuzu Erga Mio. It is completely similar to the Rainbow II, with a rounded roof dome (similar to the Rainbow II), a double-curvature windscreen with a separately mounted destination blind.

- SKG-KR290J2 (2016)
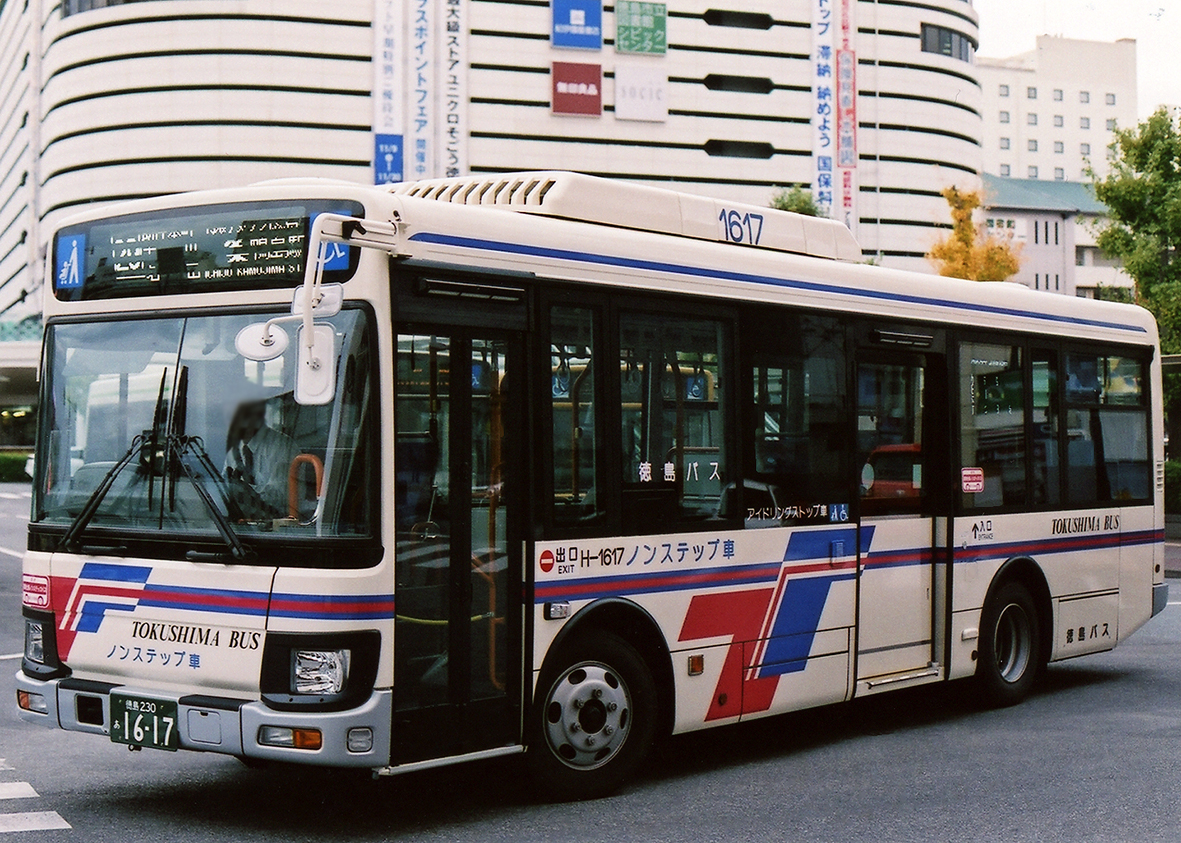
Rainbow Non Step SKG-KR290J2
