= Isuzu Erga Mio =

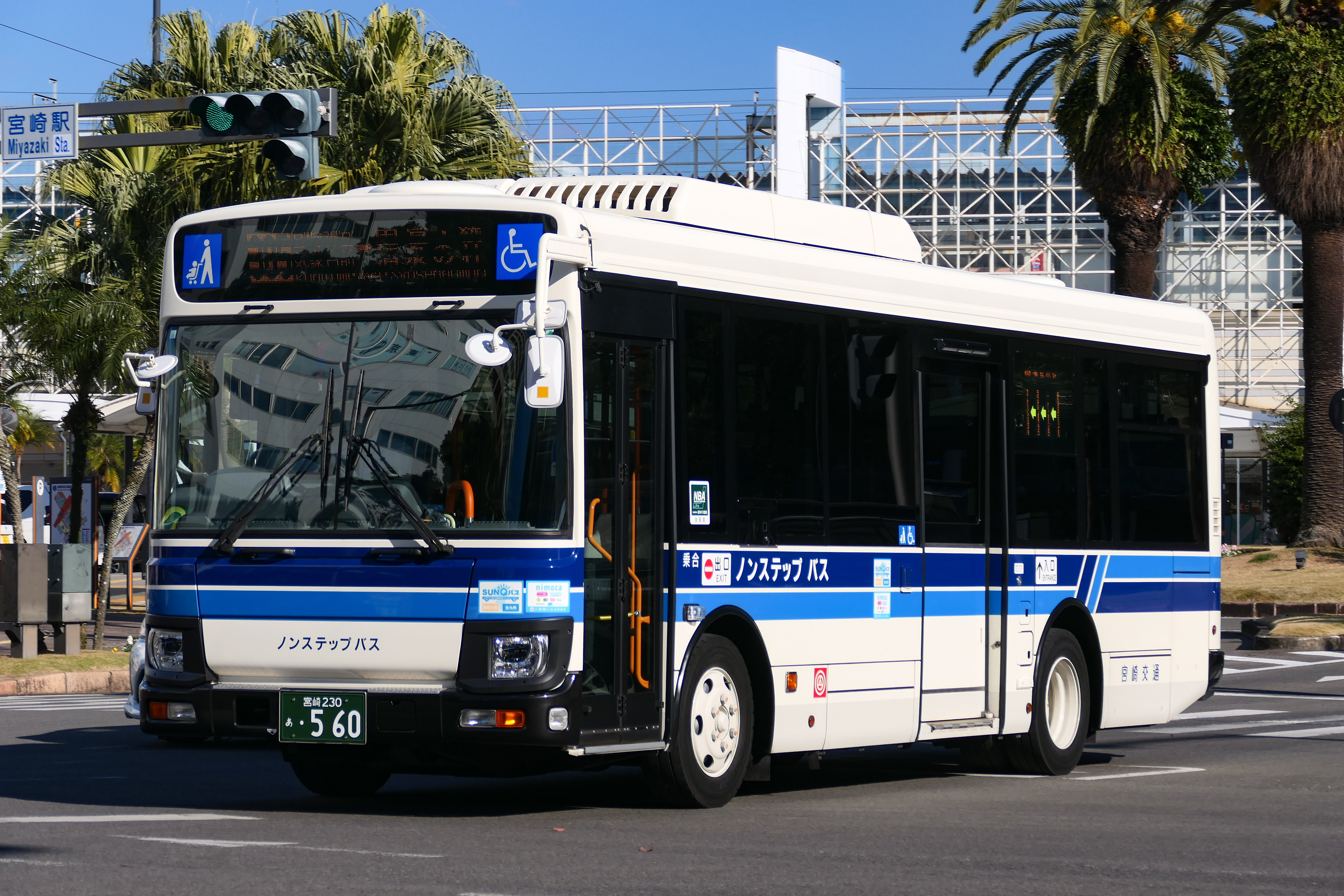

Overview
- Manufacturer: J-Bus
- Also called: Hino Rainbow II
- Production: 1999-present

Body and chassis
- Class: Midibus
- Body style: Single-decker bus
- Doors: 2
- Floor type: Step entrance (2 steps or 1 step); Low entry

Powertrain
- Engine: 4HK1, 6HA1, 6HK1, 6HF1, 6HH1
- Transmission: Isuzu 5MT (1999-2004)/6MT (2004-2016), Isuzu 6AMT (2016-), OD 5AT (1999-2011) Allison 6AT (2011-)

Dimensions
- Wheelbase: 3.4meter, 3.75meter, 4.4meter
- Length: 7.0m to 9.0m
- Width: 2.3m
- Height: 3.0m

Chronology
- Predecessor: Isuzu Journey-K

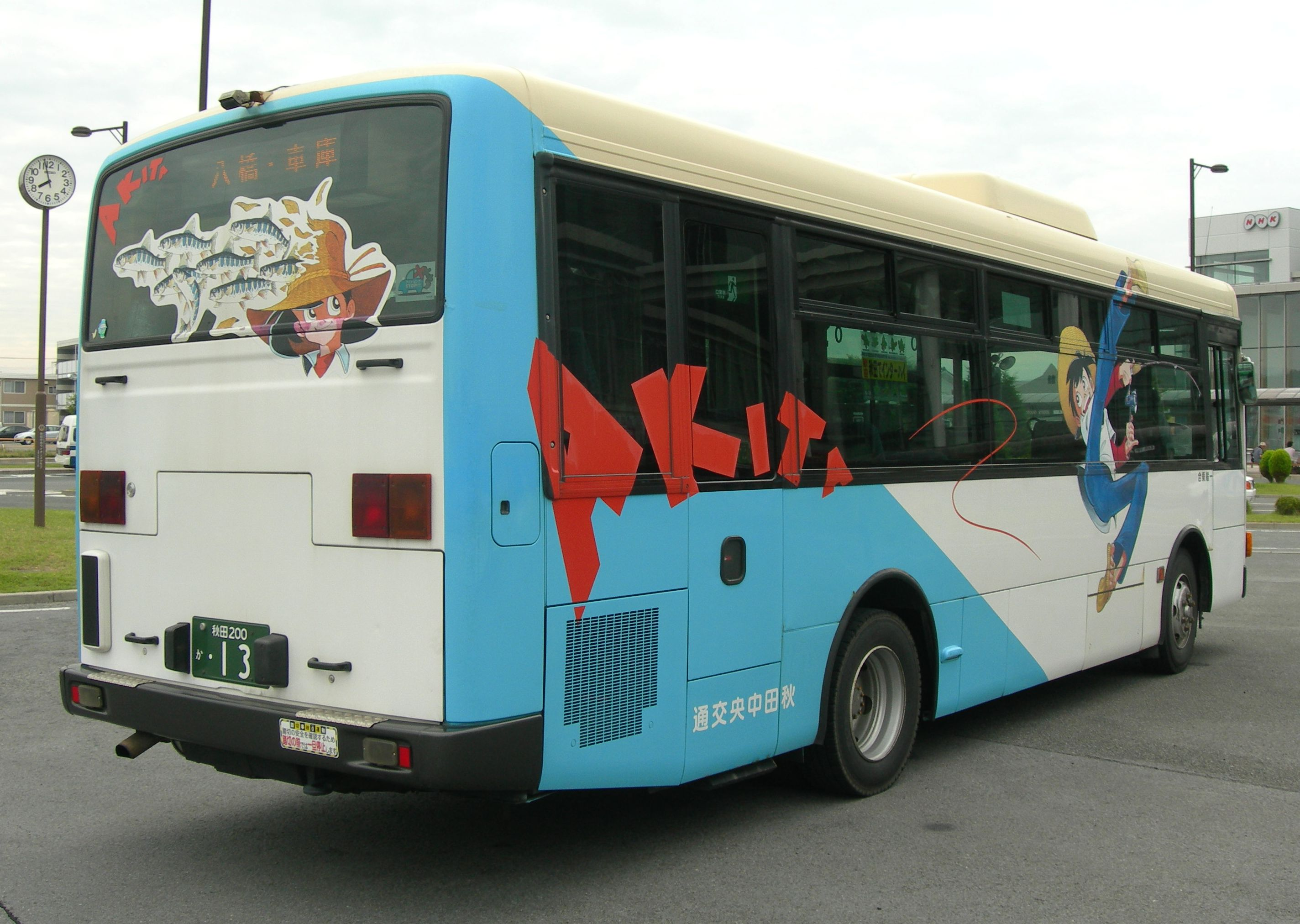
Erga Mio rear

The Isuzu Erga Mio (kana:いすゞ・エルガミオ) is a medium-duty single-decker bus produced by Isuzu through the J-Bus joint venture. It is the second medium duty bus under the Mio name, after the Gala Mio intercity coach. It is built by J-Bus from Japan either as an integral bus or a bus chassis.

== Models ==
On June 23, 1999, the Journey K (LR) underwent a full model change to comply with Japan's long-term regulations (the 1998 exhaust emission regulations) and was released.

The ERGA mio is a medium-sized route bus manufactured by J-Bus and sold by Isuzu Motors. Although development is being carried out by Isuzu Motors, due to the integration of the bus manufacturing businesses of Isuzu Motors and Hino Motors, it is now an integrated model with Hino Rainbow.

The origin of the name Erga Mio is as follows. Elga means "towards" in Latin, and was named with the image of a route bus that has begun to run towards a new era. Mio indicates that it is slightly smaller than other products.

Type/ Year/ Length/ Engine

- KK-LR233E1 (1999) 6.99m 6HH1
- KK-LR233F1 (1999) 8.14m 6HH1/ 6HA1 as CNG conversion
- KK-LR233J1 (1999) 8.99m 6HH1/ 6HA1 as CNG conversion
- PA-LR234J1 (2004) 8.99m 6HK1/ 6HA1 as CNG conversion
- PDG-LR234J2 (2007) 8.99m 6HK1/ 6HK1 as CNG conversion
- SDG-LR290J1 (2011) 8.99m 4HK1
- SKG-LR290J1 (2012) 8.99m 4HK1
- SKG-LR290J2 (2016) 8.99m 4HK1
- 2KG-LR290J3 (2017) 8.99m 4HK1
- 2KG-LR290J4 (2019) 8.99m 4HK1
- 2KG-LR290J5 (2022) 8.99m 4HK1

== Model lineup ==
- One Step 6.99m/8.14m/8.99m
- Two Step 8.99m
- Non Step 8.99m
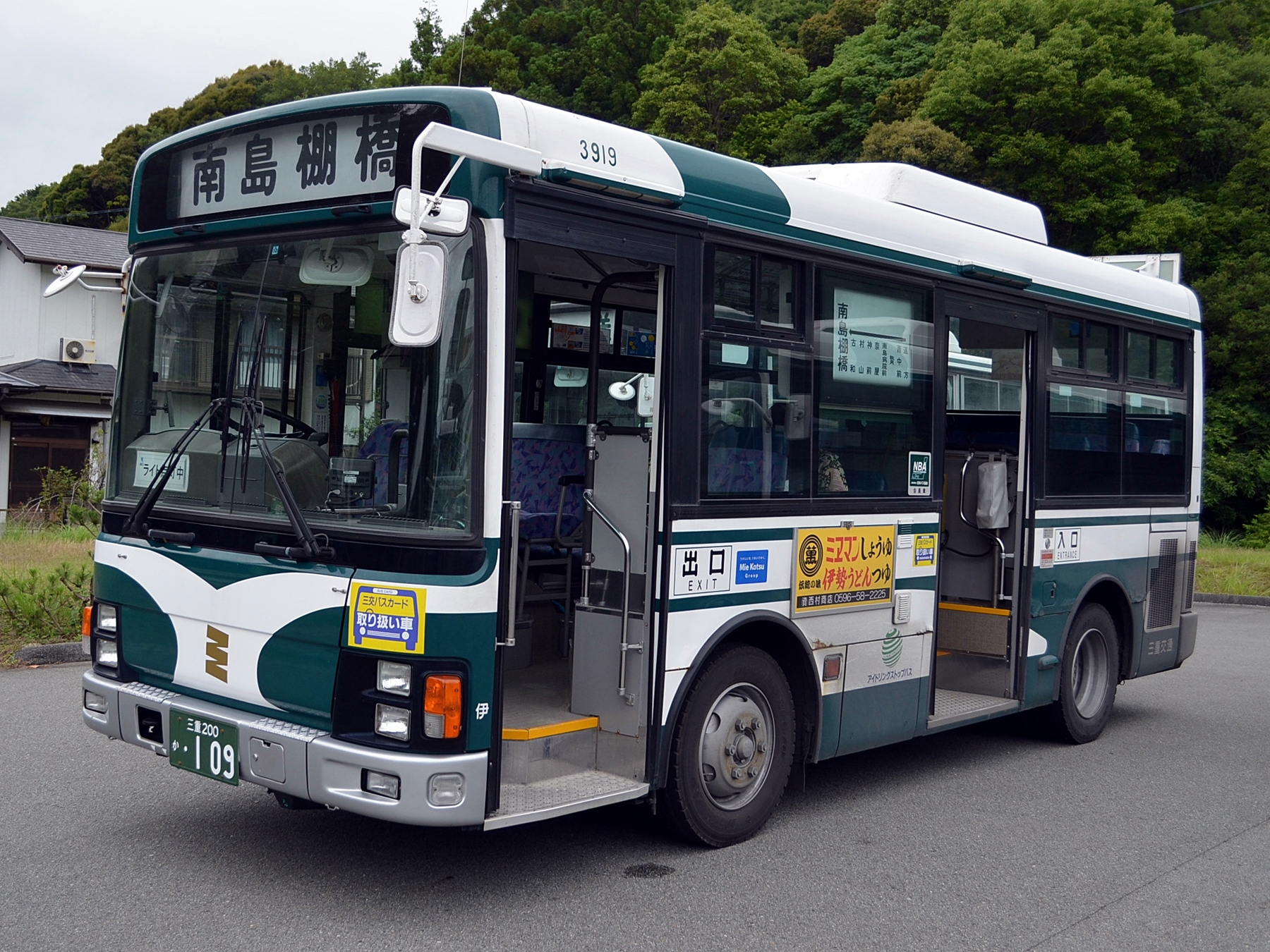
Erga Mio KK-LR233E1

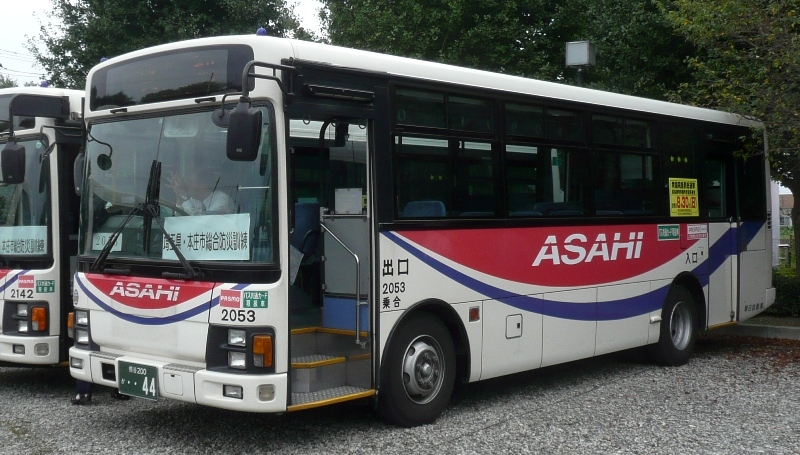
Erga Mio KK-LR233J1

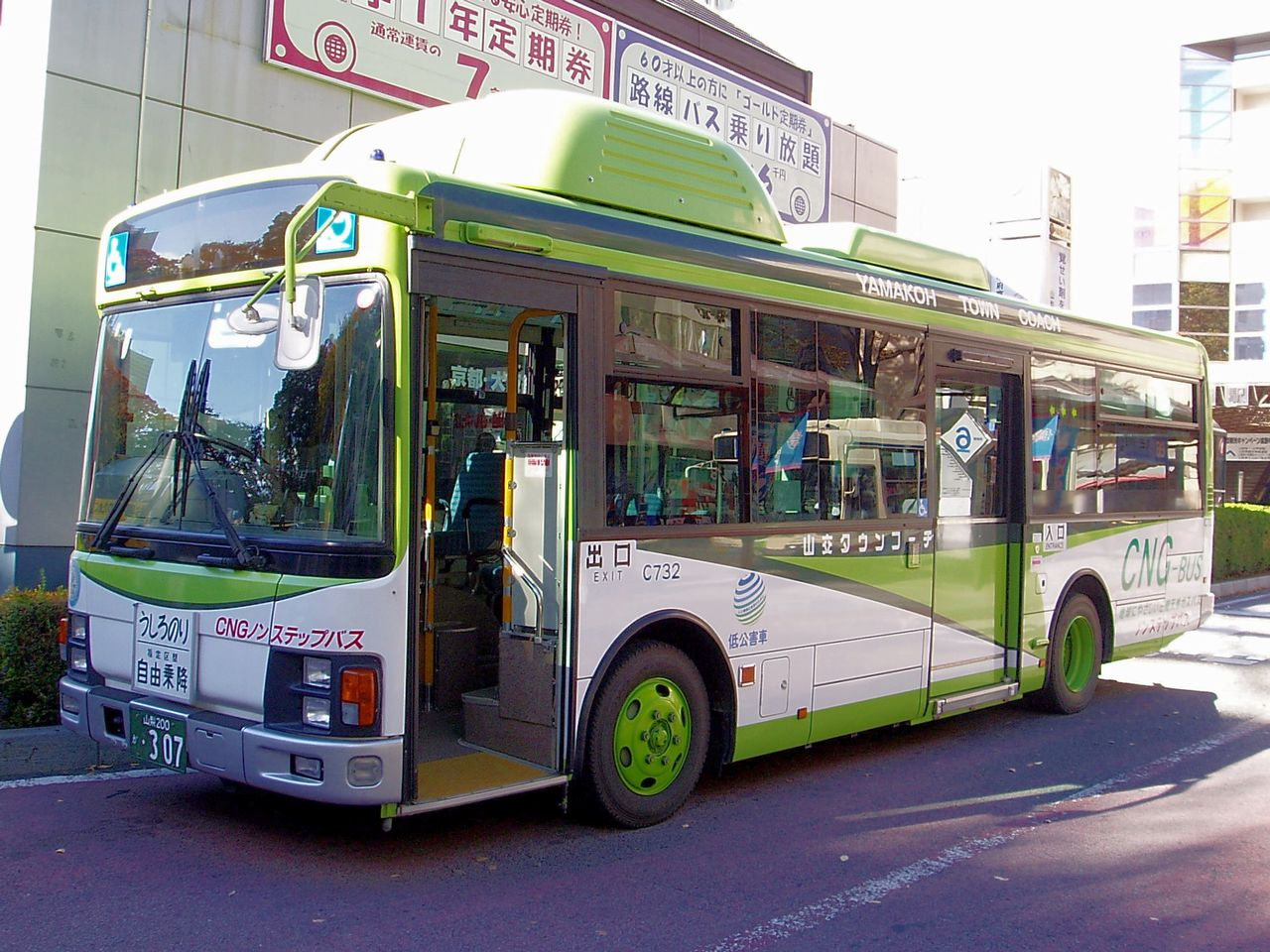
Erga Mio PDG-LR234J2 CNG

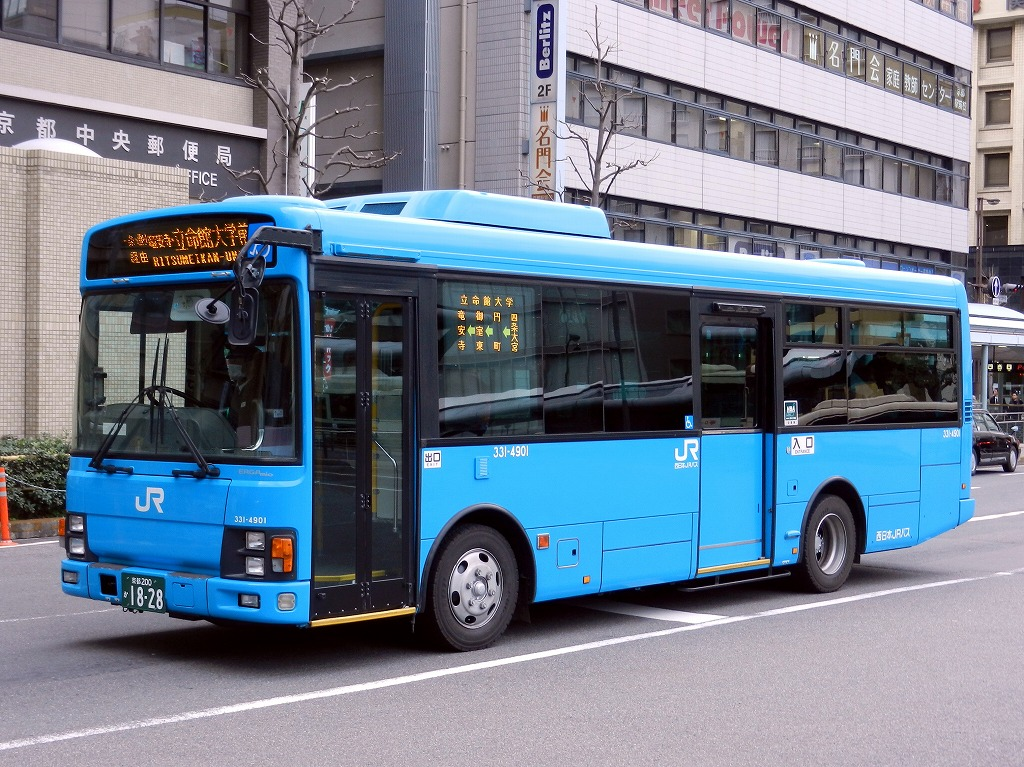
Erga Mio PA-LR234J1

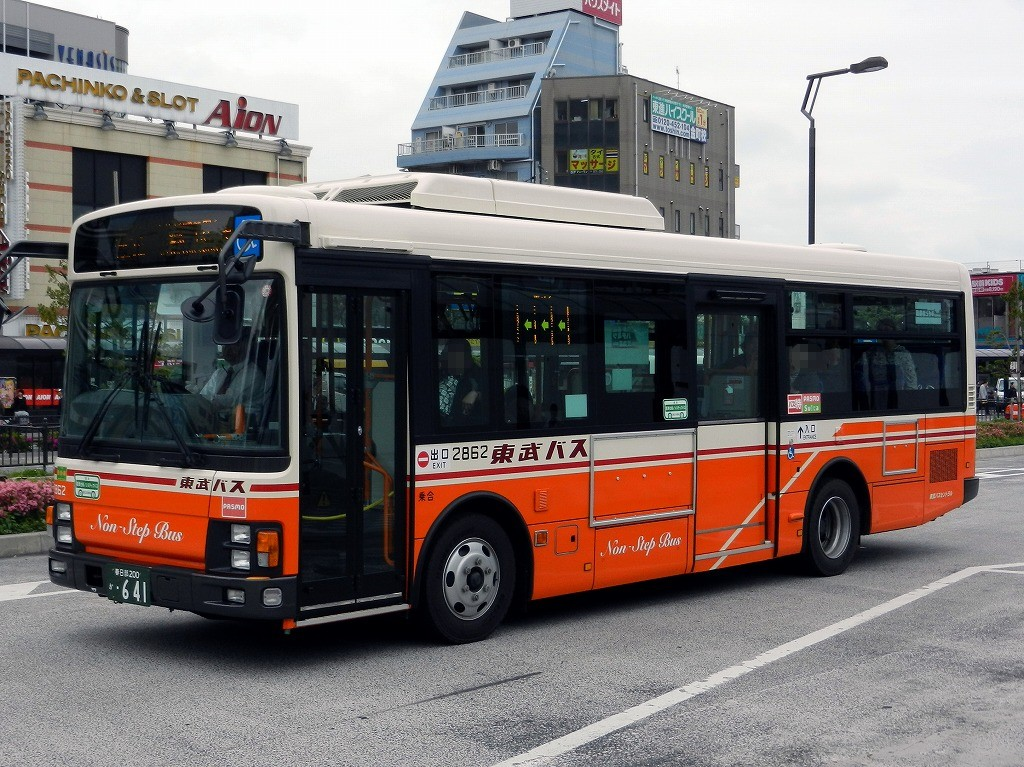
Erga Mio SDG-LR290J1

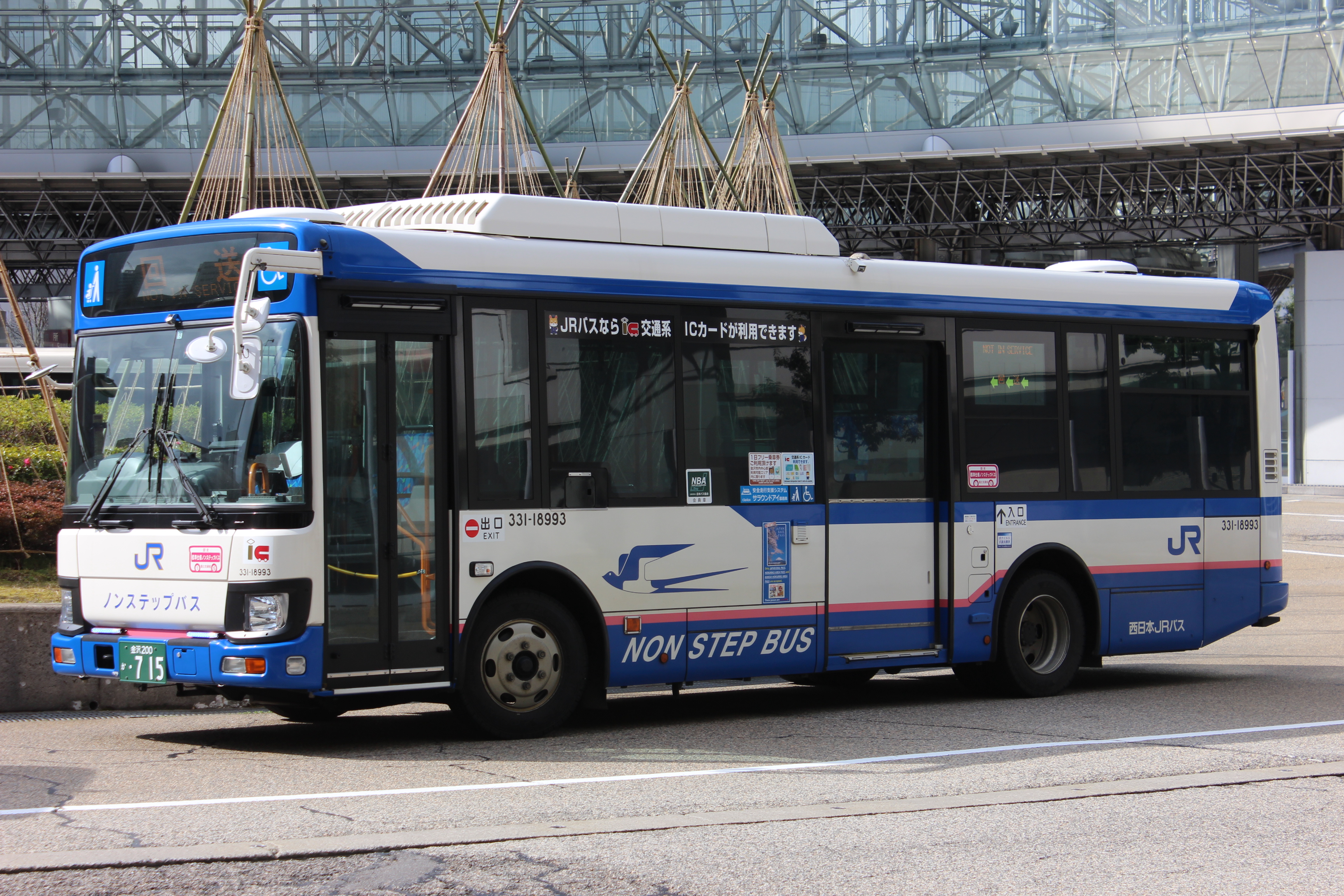
Erga Mio 2KG-LR290J3

== See also ==
- List of buses
