= Hino Melpha =

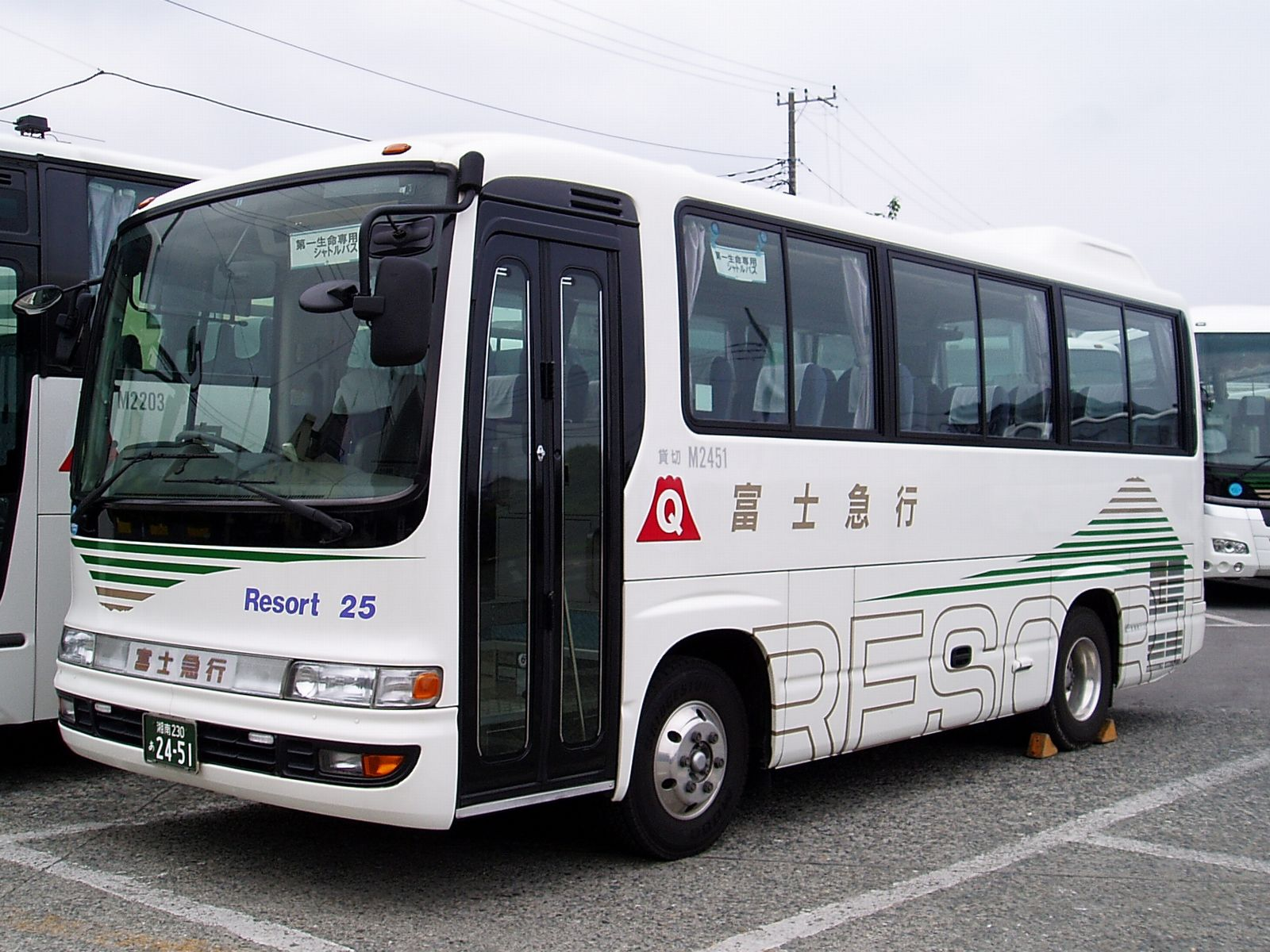

Overview
- Manufacturer: Hino
- Production: 1998–present

Body and chassis
- Class: Buses
- Body style: Bus
- Related: Isuzu Gala Mio

Powertrain
- Engine: J07E
- Transmission: Hino (manual), Aisin (automatic)

Chronology
- Predecessor: Hino Rainbow 7M/7W/RR

The Hino Melpha (kana:日野・メルファ) is a medium-duty bus built by Hino Motors through the J-Bus joint-venture. The range has been primarily available as tourist coach since 1998.

== Models ==
- Melpha 7 7 m (23 ft) (1998–2004)
  - KK-CH1JFEA
- Melpha 9 9 m (30 ft) (1999–2004)
  - KK-RR1JJFA
- Melpha 9 m (2004–present)
  - PB-RR7JJAA (2004)
  - BDG-RR7JJBA (2007)
  - SDG-RR7JJCA (2011)
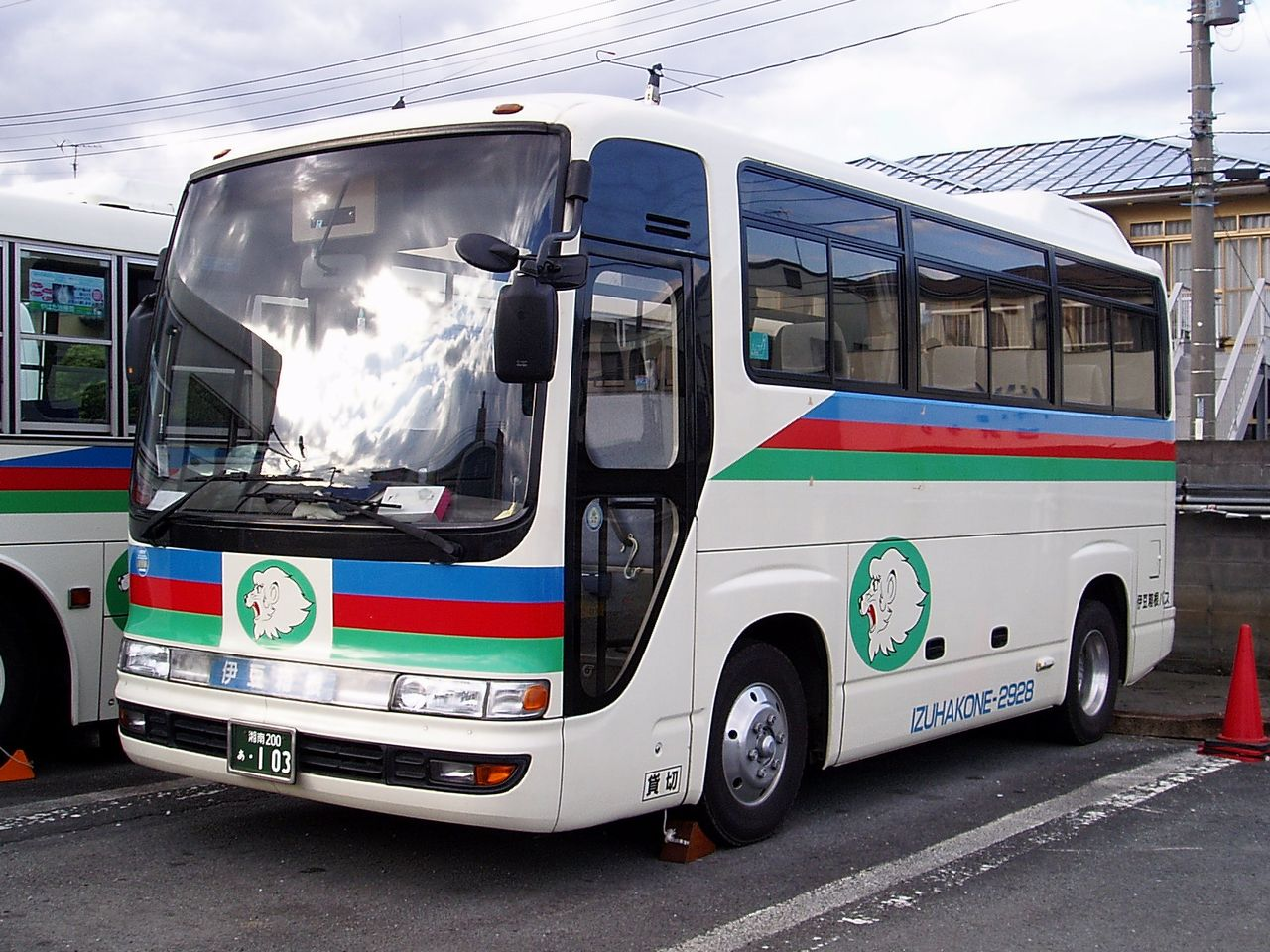
Melpha KK-CH1JFEA

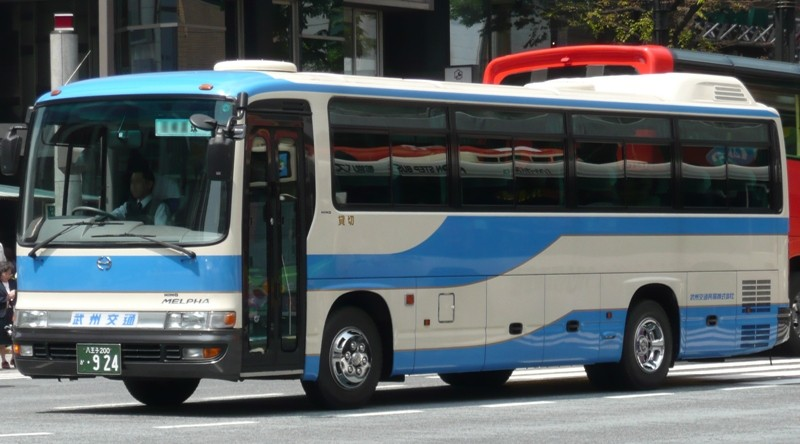
Melpha PB-RR7JJAA

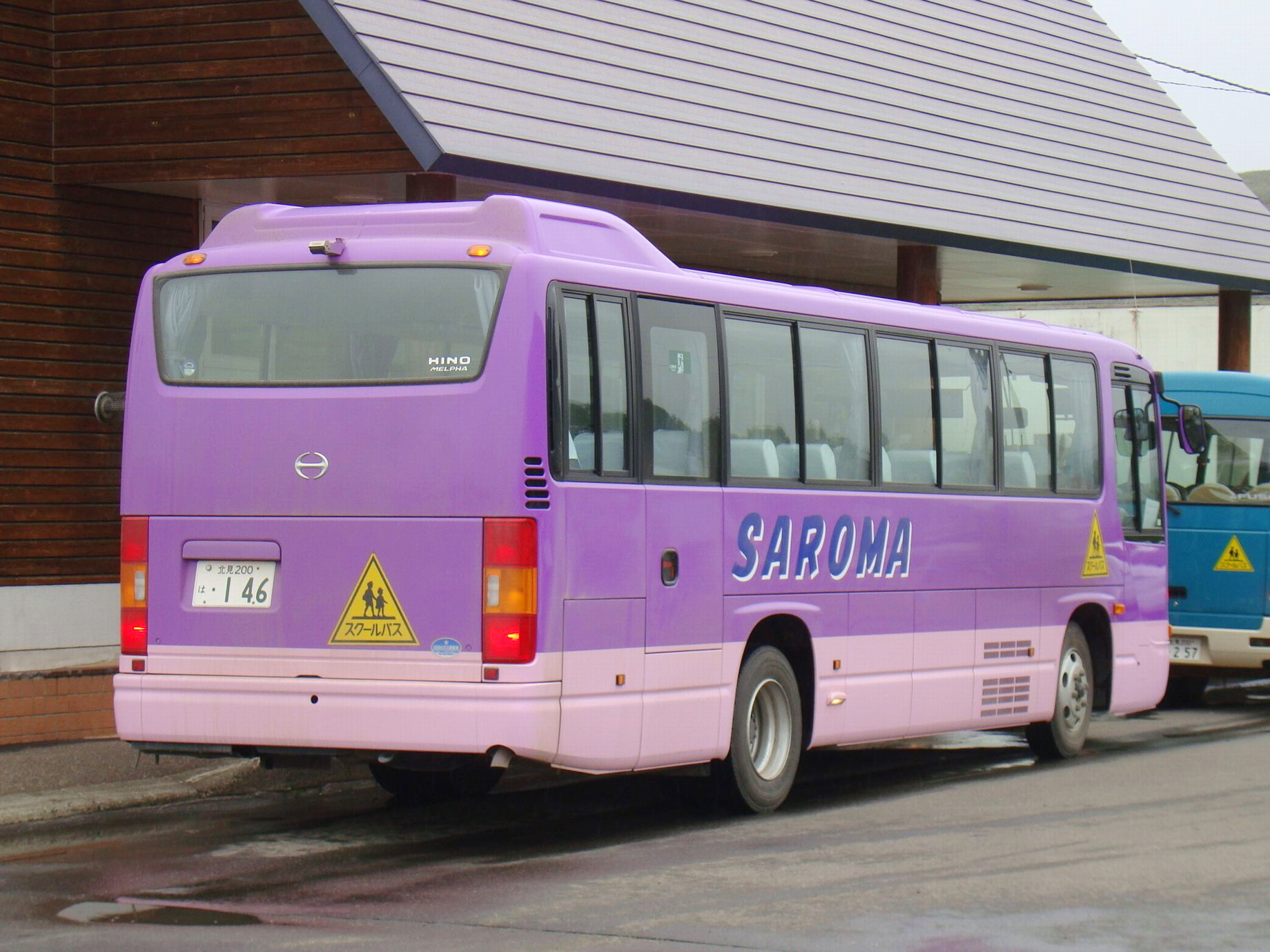
Hino Melpha rear

== See also ==
- List of buses
