= Isuzu Journey-K =

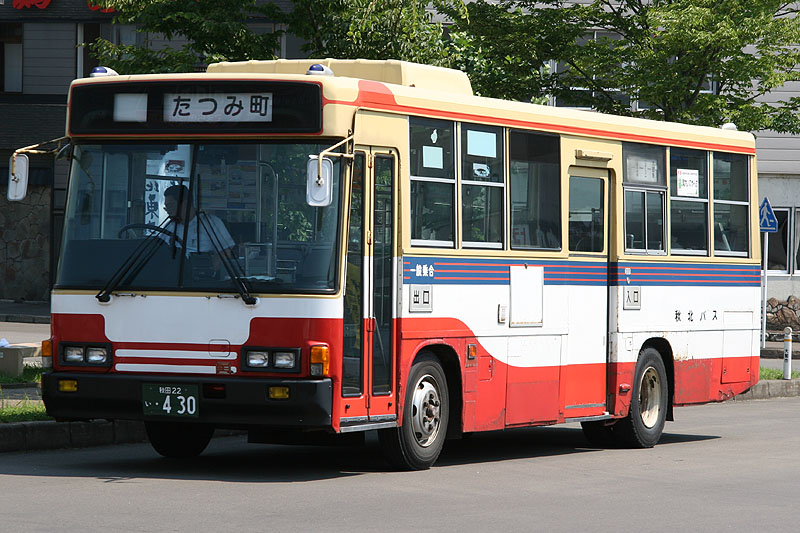

Overview
- Manufacturer: Isuzu
- Production: 1984–1999

Body and chassis
- Class: Complete bus Bus chassis
- Body style: Single-deck public bus Single-deck intercity bus
- Doors: 1 or 2
- Floor type: Step entrance (2 steps or 1 step); Low entry

Powertrain
- Transmission: 5-speed manual 5-speed automatic

Dimensions
- Wheelbase: 3.75 metres, 4.3 metres
- Length: 8.2 metres to 8.9 metres
- Width: 2.3 metres
- Height: 3.0 metres

Chronology
- Predecessor: Isuzu CCM/CDM
- Successor: Isuzu Erga Mio

The Isuzu Erga Journey-K (kana:いすゞ・ジャーニーK) was a midibus built by Isuzu of Japan from 1984 to 1999. The range was primarily available as a public bus and an intercity bus either as an integral bus or a bus chassis.

It was offered as Two Step (known as step entrance) or One Step (known as low entry) in lengths 9m only. In 1999, public bus and intercity bus variants of Journey-K were superseded by Isuzu Erga Mio and Isuzu Gala Mio, respectively.

== Isuzu medium-duty buses ==
- BK30 (1972)
- CCM370/410 (1976)
- K-CCM370/410 (1980)
- K-CDM370/410 (1982)

The CCM370 has Isuzu's 5.8 liter 6BD1 diesel engine with 160 PS (118 kW).

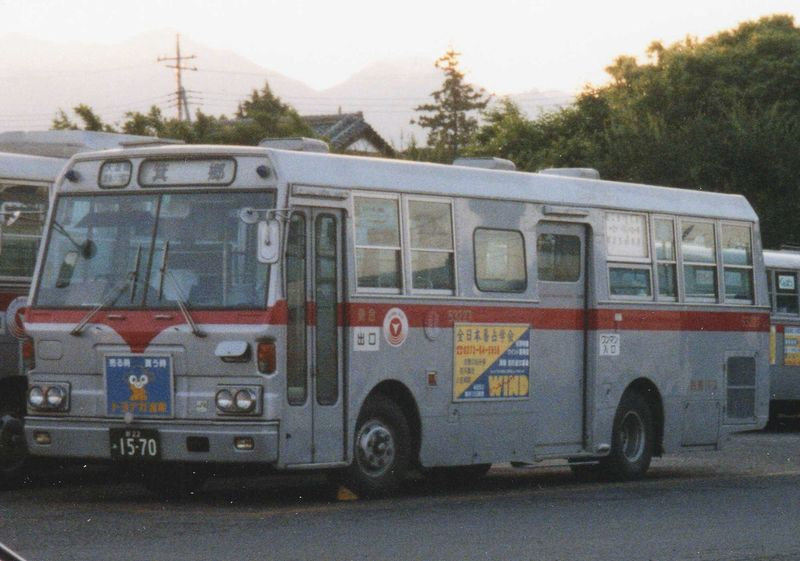
K-CCM370

== Models ==
- P-LR212/311/312 (1984)
- U-LR312/332 (1990)
- KC-LR233/333 (1995)
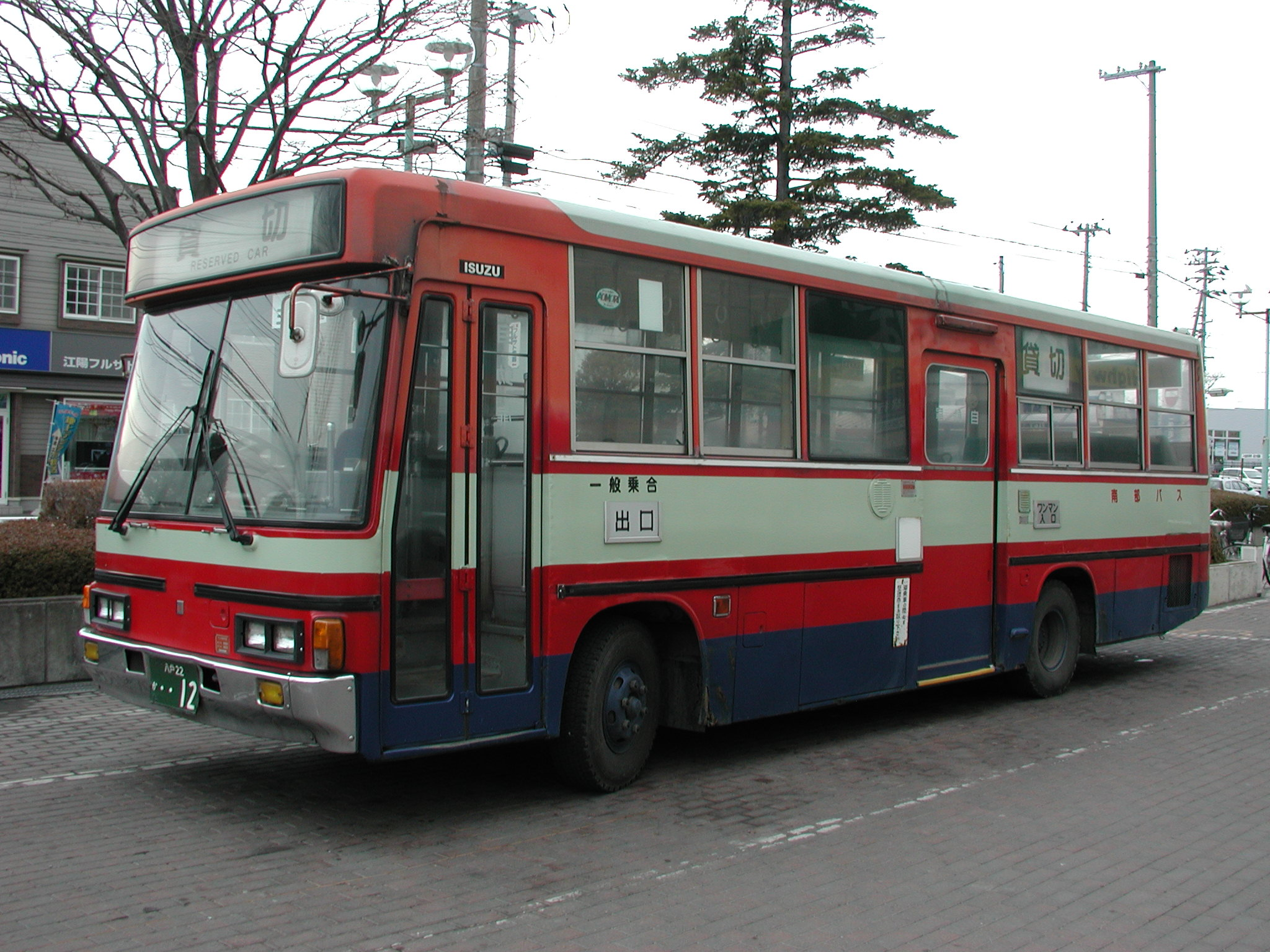
Journey-K P-LR312J

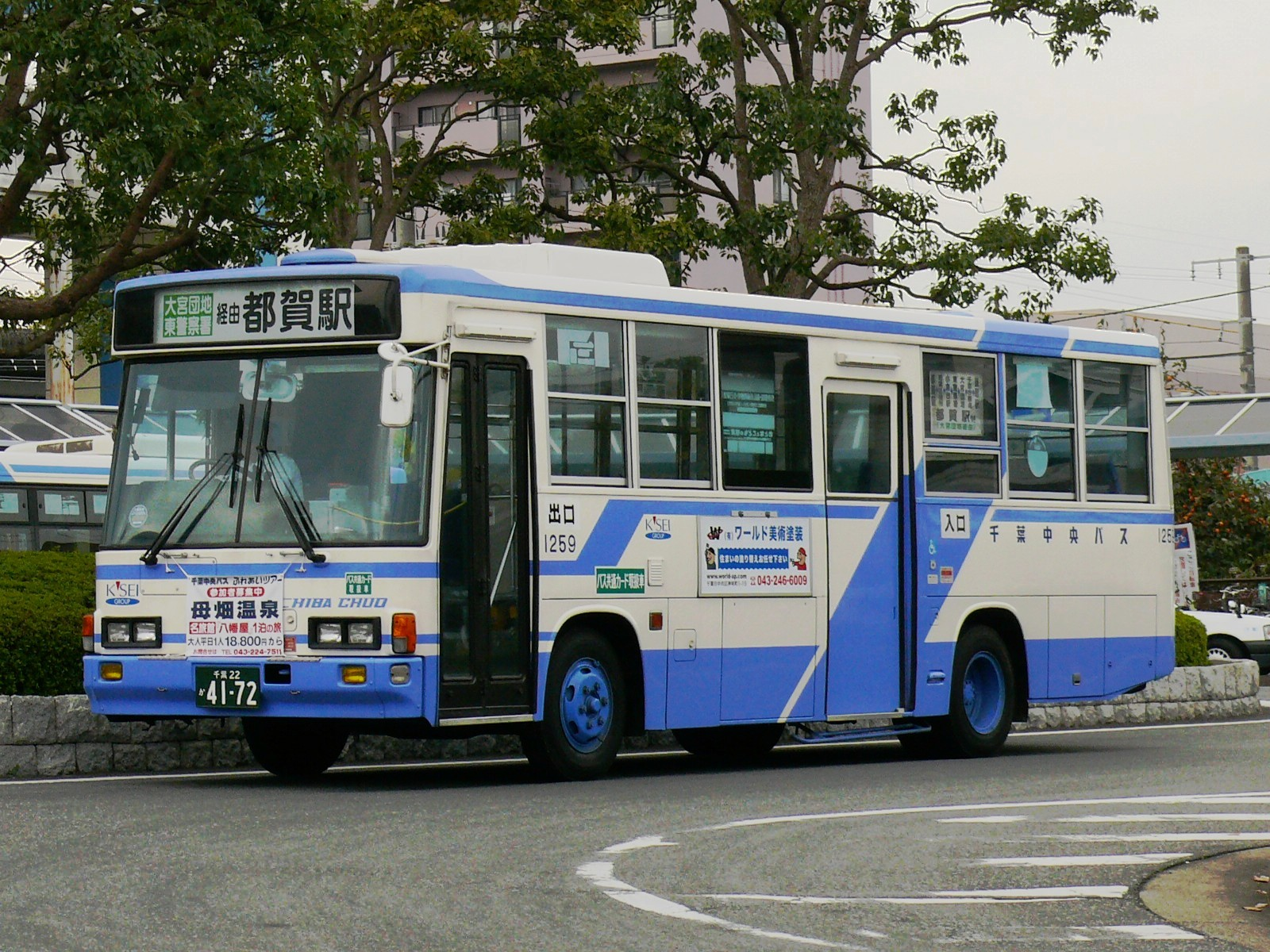
Journey-K KC-LR333J

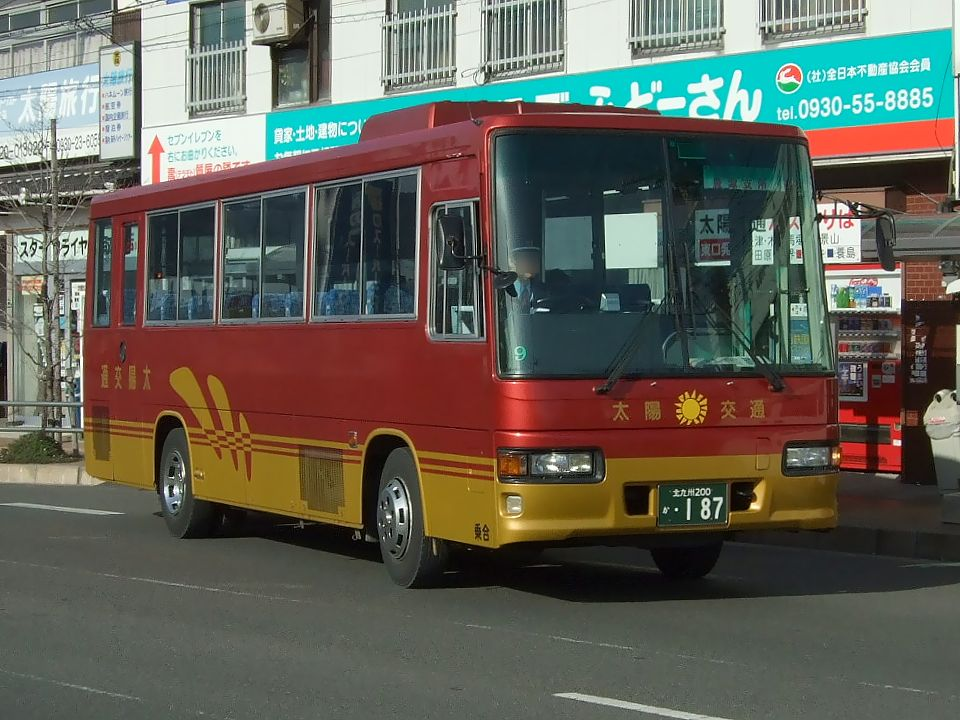
Journey-K (tourist coach) KC-LR233J

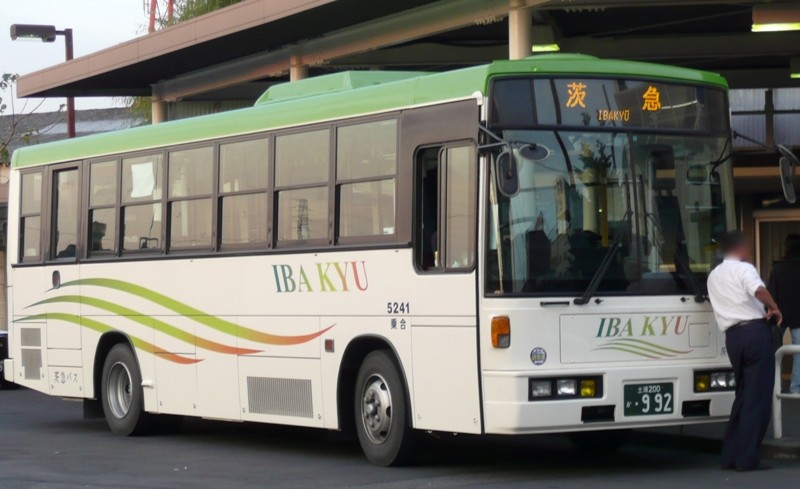
Journey-K (FHI 8E body) KC-LR333J

== Model lineup ==
- One Step 9m
- Two Step 9m

== See also ==
- List of buses
