= J-Bus =

Japanese bus and coach manufacturer

J-Bus Ltd.
- Native name: ジェイ・バス株式会社
- Romanized name: Jei-basu Kabushiki-gaisha
- Company type: Joint venture
- Industry: Automotive
- Predecessors: Hino Auto Body Industries Co., Ltd.; Isuzu Bus Manufacturing Co., Ltd.
- Founded: 1 October 2002; 23 years ago
- Headquarters: Komatsu, Ishikawa, Japan
- Key people: Tetsuro Ishikawa (President)
- Products: Buses, coaches, parts
- Revenue: ▼¥32,489 million (FY2021)
- Operating income: ▲ -¥530 million (FY2021)
- Net income: ▲ -¥104 million (FY2021)
- Total assets: ▲¥23,948 million (FY2021)
- Total equity: ▼¥10,632 million (FY2021)
- Owners: Hino (50%); Isuzu (50%)
- Number of employees: 1,541 (March 2022)
- Website: www.jbus.co.jp
- Footnotes / references Fiscal Year 2021 (FY2021) is from 1 April 2021 to 31 March 2022. References

J-Bus is a Japanese manufacturer of buses and coaches established in 2002 as a joint venture between Isuzu and Hino. The venture was formed by merging the previous bus and coach operations of both manufacturers and started operations in 2004.

== History ==
In January 2002, Hino and Isuzu said they had agreed to merge their bus/coach development and manufactuting operations. These were the subsidiaries Hino Auto Body Industries Co., Ltd. (a plant in Komatsu, Ishikawa) from Hino and Isuzu Bus Manufacturing Co., Ltd. (Utsunomiya) from Isuzu. In October 2002, the J-Bus joint venture was established, and the companies started the business integration process. The integration was completed in 2004.

In 2017, J-Bus announced the first articulated bus developed in Japan. Isuzu engineers were in charge of the body and chassis and Hino's of the engine and hybrid system. The bus was introduced by 2020. By 2018, J-Bus' Komatsu plant started to assemble the fuel cell bus Toyota Sora for Toyota. In February 2022, Hino and Isuzu said they planned to start assembling large electric transit buses at J-Bus by 2024.

== Facilities ==
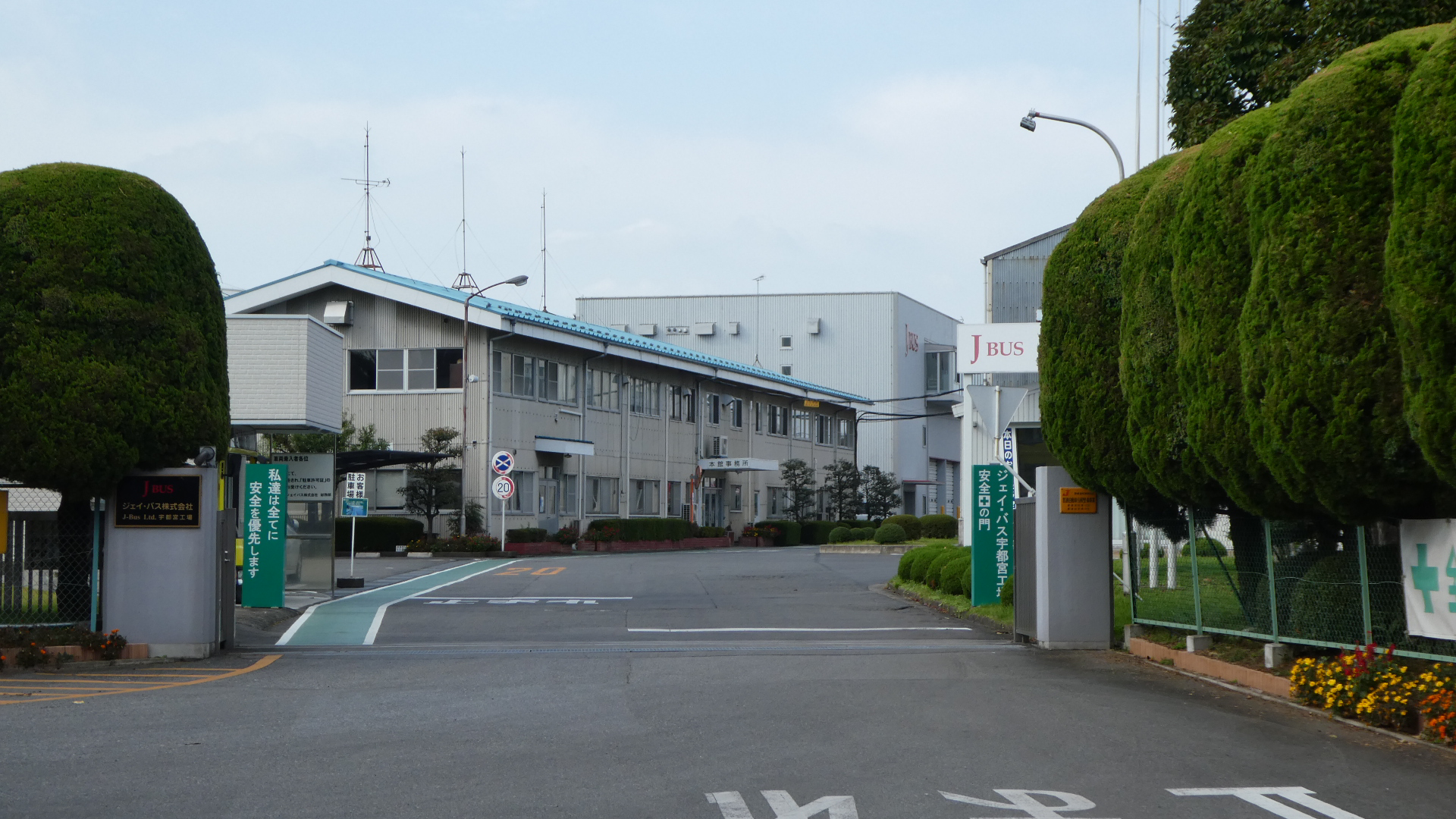
Utsunomiya facilities

J-Bus has two assembly plants: Komatsu and Utsunomiya.

The Komatsu plant mostly produces coaches and houses the venture headquarters. It has administrative, engineering, design, and production facilities. The plant complex buildings cover 72,379 m^{2} (779,080 sq ft). The Utsunomiya plant produces transit buses and covers 49,879 m^{2} (536,890 sq ft).

== Products ==
As of June 2023, J-Bus assembles various coach and transit bus models.

=== Komatsu plant ===
- Hino Selega / Isuzu Gala (high deck coach, short and long version)
- Hino Melpha / Isuzu Gala Mio (short range coach)
- Hino Poncho (small bus)
- Toyota Sora (fuel cell transit bus)

=== Utsunomiya plant ===
- Isuzu Erga / Hino Blue Ribbon (large size, internal combustion engined and hybrid transit bus)
- Isuzu Erga Duo / Hino Blue Ribbon (large size, hybrid articulated bus)
- Isuzu Erga Mio / Hino Rainbow (medium size transit bus)
