= Isuzu Gala Mio =

Japanese midicoach bus

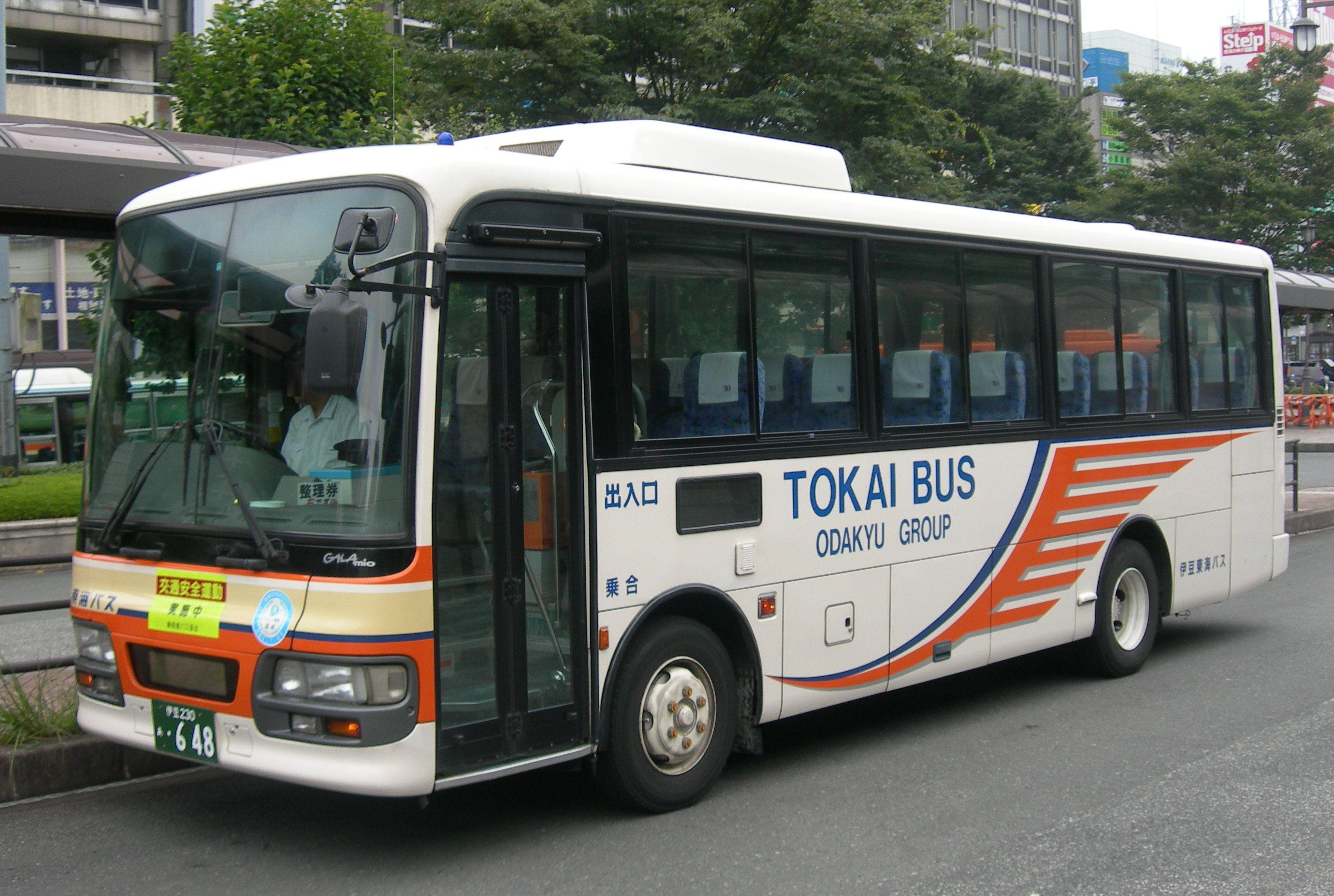

Overview
- Manufacturer: Isuzu
- Production: 1999–present

Body and chassis
- Class: Integral bus
- Body style: Single-decker intercity bus
- Doors: 1 door
- Floor type: Step entrance
- Related: Hino Melpha

Powertrain
- Transmission: 6-speed manual 5-speed automatic

Chronology
- Predecessor: Isuzu Journey-K

The Isuzu Gala Mio (kana:いすゞ・ガーラミオ) is a midicoach produced by Isuzu through the J-Bus joint venture. It is also available as the intercity coach only.

== First generation (1999-2004) ==
- KK-LR233E1/J1 (1999)

== Second generation (2004-present) ==
The second generation Gala Mio is a rebadged Hino Melpha.

- PB-RR7JJAJ (2004)
- BDG-RR7JJBJ (2007)
- SDG-RR7JJCJ (2011)
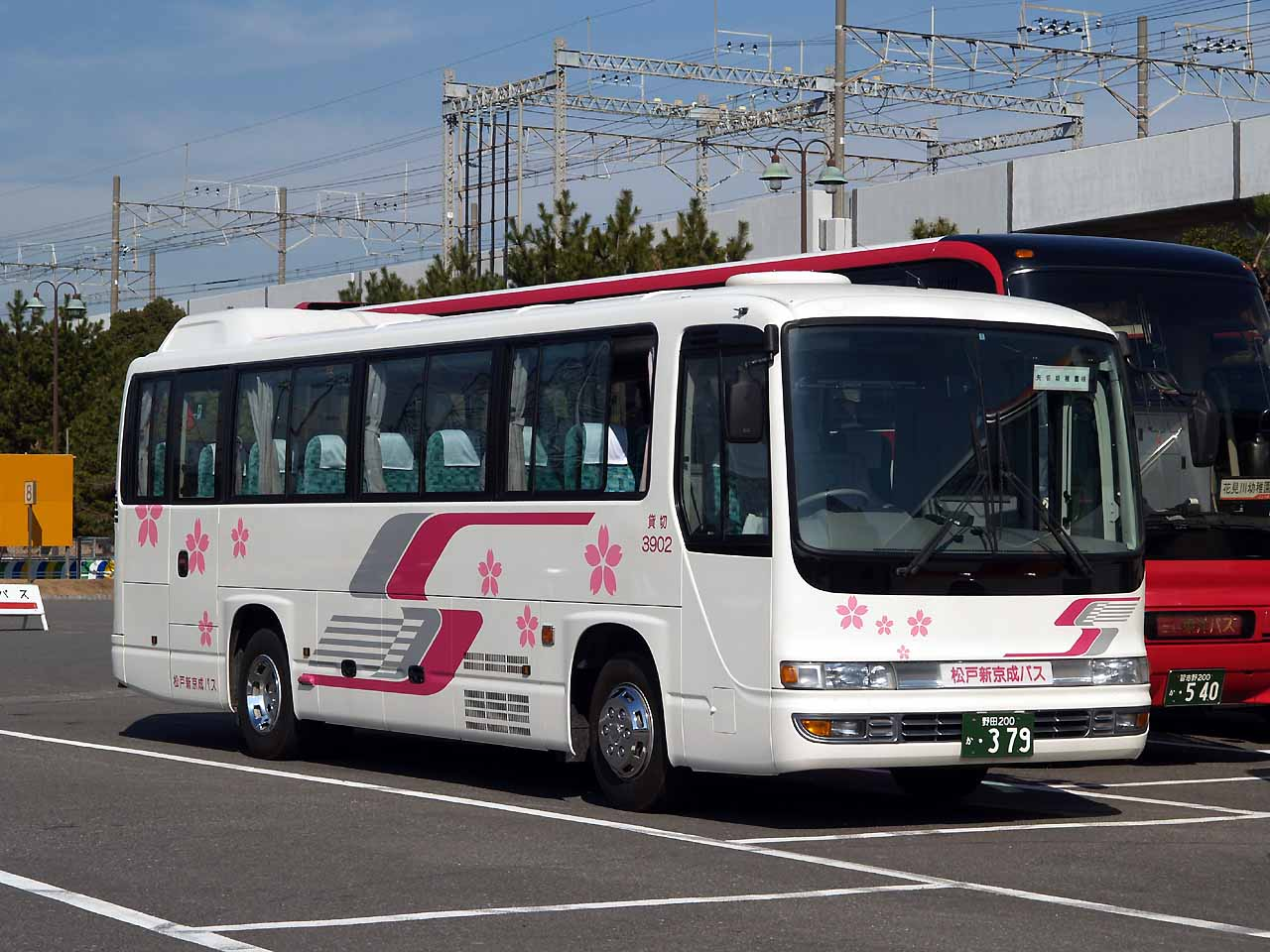
Gala Mio (2nd generation)

== Model lineup ==
- M-I
- M-II
- M-III

== See also ==
- List of buses
