= Hino TH-series =

Hino TH and derivatives
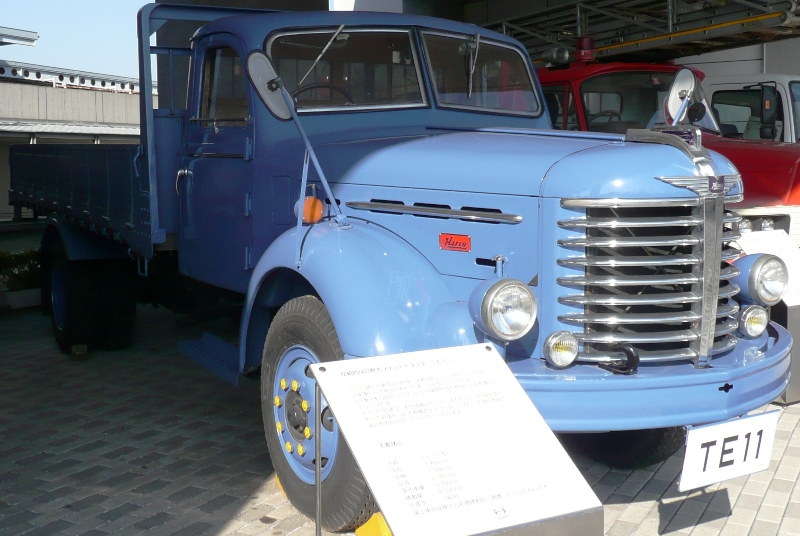
- 1961–1965 Hino TE11

Overview
- Manufacturer: Hino Motors; Kuozui Motors
- Also called: Hino TA, TE, HD
- Production: May 1950–1968
- Assembly: Japan: Tokyo; Burma: Tonbo, Pandaung Township (MADI)

Body and chassis
- Class: Truck
- Related: Hino BH10 bus

Powertrain
- Engine: 7-8 L Hino DS diesel I6

In May 1950 the heavy-duty Hino TH10 truck was introduced, equipped with the all-new 7-liter DS10 diesel engine. An eight-tonner, this was considerably larger than existing Japanese trucks which had rarely been built for more than 6 tonnes (13,200 lb) payload. The model became a common sight in Japan and in Southeast Asia, its main export market, before being retired in 1968 in favor of the more modern cab over trucks which succeeded it. The Hino TE and derivatives was the first truck to be manufactured in Myanmar, where it was built until the turn of the millennium.

== History ==
The TH10 had a 4,800 mm (190 in) wheelbase and a 110 PS (81 kW) DS10 diesel inline-six. Around the time of introduction, the BH10 bus was introduced, with the same chassis and nose. In 1954 the TH11 appeared, followed by the 125 PS TH12 in 1955. This engine was called the DS12. In 1956 the TH13 arrived. In 1960 power went up to 155 PS for the TH16. By June 1961 the trucks had become the TH17, with an eight-liter engine with 160 PS (118 kW) (DS50).

In June 1956 the TA10 appeared, a model with a shorter wheelbase for increased maneuverability and with a slightly lower, 7.5 tonnes (16,500 lb) payload. It has the 150 PS (110 kW) DS30 engine. This was upgraded to the TA12 in July 1958, followed by the 155 PS (114 kW) TA13 in August 1960. The TA14 appeared in July 1961; its specifications are similar to those of the contemporary TH16.

In August 1959 the shorter and lighter TE10 was presented, with a 6.5 tonnes (14,300 lb) payload and a 4,200 mm (170 in) wheelbase. In 1961 the TE11 was introduced, with a slightly more powerful DS70 engine. In September 1958 the cab over TC model was introduced; this shared a lot of parts with the TH range but had a 10 tonnes (22,000 lb) payload.

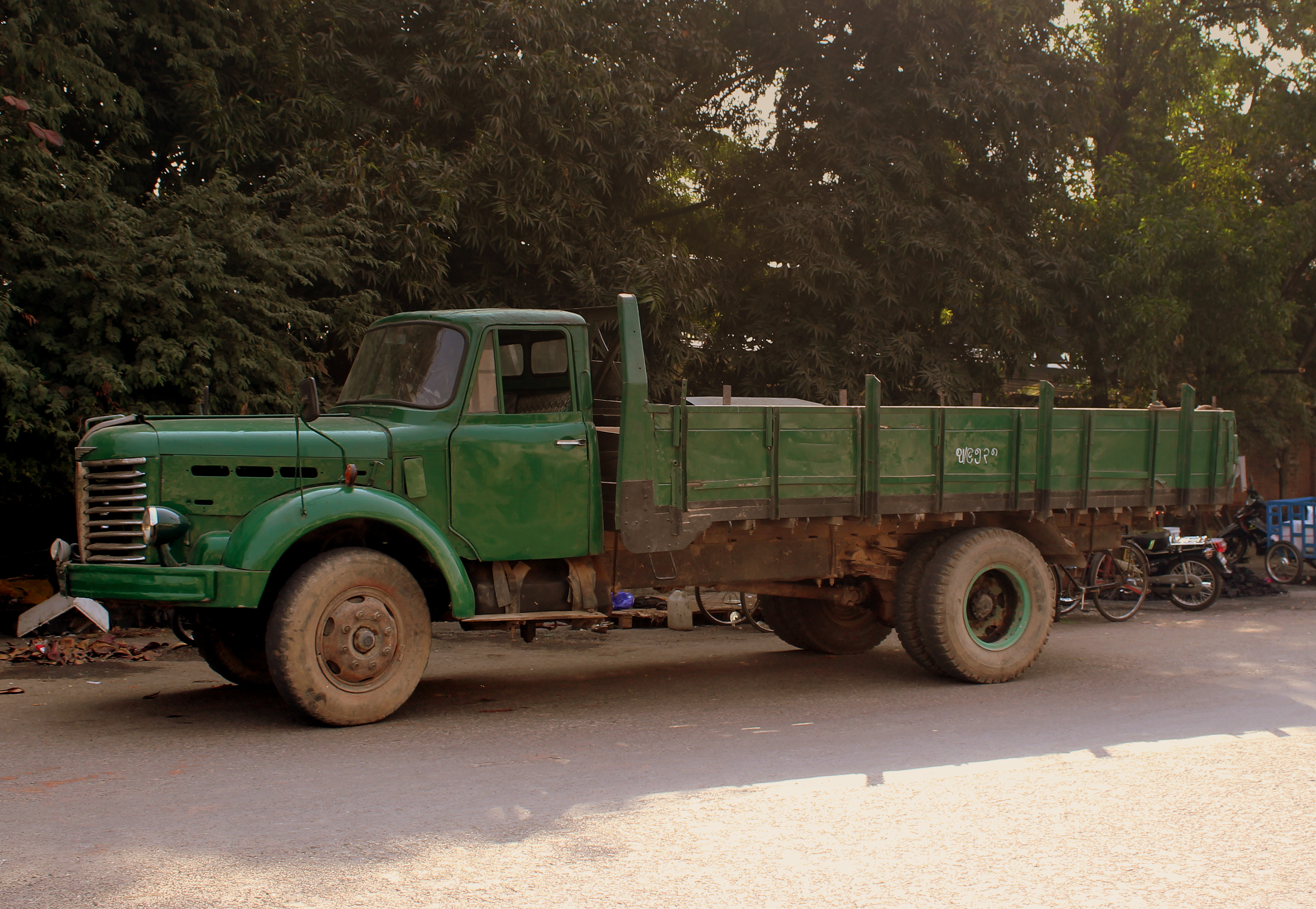
1964–1968 Hino TA14 in Myanmar, with the curved windshield

In 1964 or 1965 the split flat windshield was changed to a still divided but curved unit without a pillar in the center. At the same time, the doors were changed to a taller, more square design with a ventilation window.

=== Export models ===
There was also the HD tractor unit, a model which was only sold in export markets. Hino trucks began to be imported to Japan in 1954, while the Hino TE (and versions thereof, including the Hino BM bus) entered production in Myanmar in 1965. This was part of Japanese war reparations to then-Burma. Manufacture was carried out by MADI (Myanmar Automobile and Diesel Engine Industries) in the "No 2 Automobile Industry" plant in the small town of Tonbo, at Kwinhla Station, Pandaung Township, Bago Division (just north of Yangon), where MADI also assembled the Mazda Pathfinder and the DS-70 engine for the trucks.

== Z-series ==
There were also heavy duty four-wheel drive (ZH) and six-wheel drive (ZC) trucks developed, mainly for the Japan Self-Defense Forces but also available for sale to private customers as well as other government agencies. The first was the 6×6 ZC, in 1952, the four-wheel drive ZH appeared in 1959. Around the time of the ZH's introduction, the Z-series also switched from semaphore indicators to turn signals, subsequent to a change in the laws. These have the same cabin as the TH-series, but with a square grille and a more utilitarian appearance. The Z-series was discontinued in 1975, when the cab over HH/HE model replaced it.
