= Hino Motors =

Japanese vehicle manufacturing company

Hino Motors, Ltd
- Hino Motors' logo, used since 2026

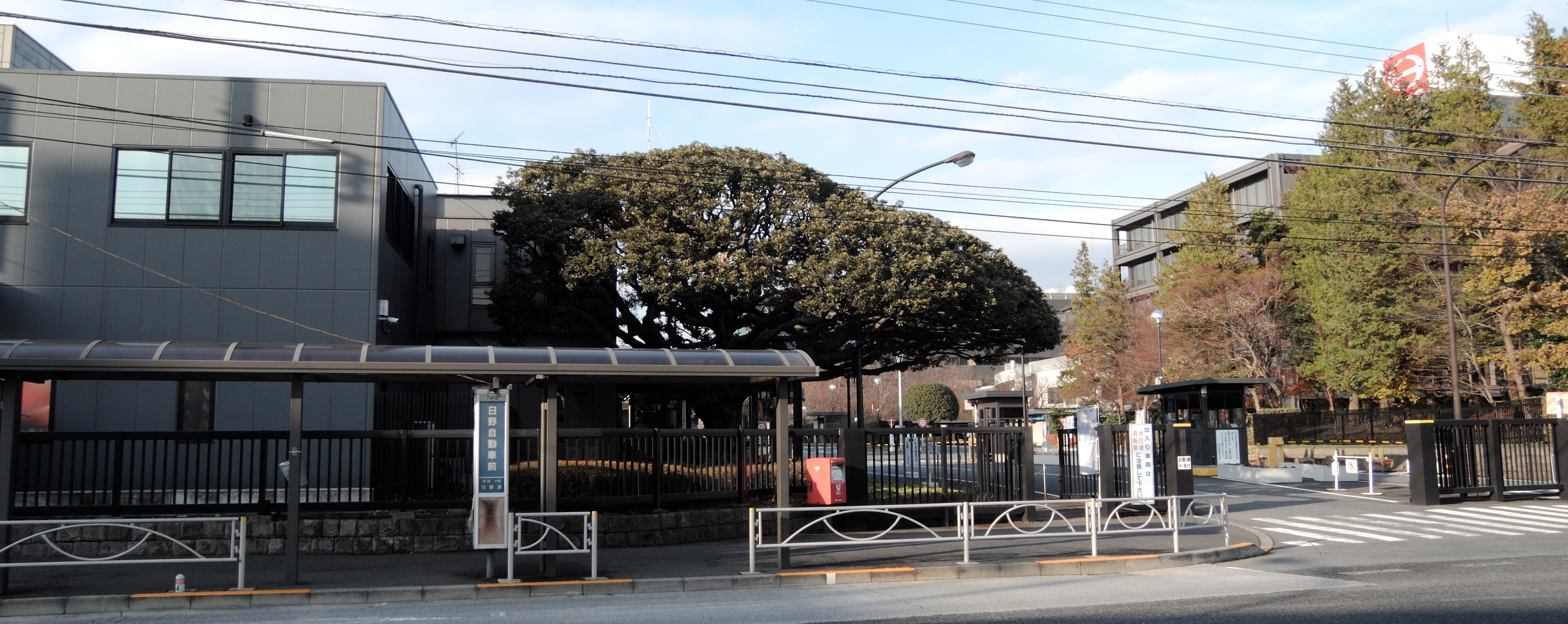
- Hino Motors headquarters in Hino, Japan
- Native name: 日野自動車株式会社
- Romanized name: Hino Jidōsha Kabushiki-gaisha
- Formerly: Hino Heavy Industry Co., Ltd.; Hino Industry Co., Ltd; Hino Diesel Industry Co. Ltd.
- Type: Subsidiary (K.K)
- Traded as: TYO: 7205
- Industry: Automotive
- Predecessor: Diesel Motor Industry Co., Ltd.
- Founded: 1 May 1942; 84 years ago
- Headquarters: Hino, Tokyo, Japan
- Area served: Worldwide
- Key people: Satyakam Arya (President & CEO)
- Products: Trucks and buses
- Production output: ▲175,096 vehicles (2022)
- Revenue: ▲¥1,507,336 million (FY2023)
- Operating income: ▼¥17,406 million (FY2023)
- Net income: ▼ −¥117,664 million (FY2023)
- Total assets: ▲¥1,361,735 million (FY2023)
- Total equity: ▼¥433,409 million (FY2023)
- Number of employees: 34,231 (March 2023, consolidated)
- Parent: Archion
- Website: www.hino-global.com
- Footnotes: Fiscal Year (FY) is 1 April of the prior year to 31 March of the named year.; References

Hino Motors, Ltd. commonly known as Hino, is a Japanese manufacturer of commercial vehicles and diesel engines. Its principal activity is the production, marketing and sale of Hino commercial vehicles (including those Trucks, Busses, and other commercial vehicles) and diesel engines headquartered in Hino, Tokyo. The company's predecessor, Tokyo Gas Industry, was established in 1910. It was later established as a corporate spin-off in 1942 under the name Hino Heavy Industry.

Hino began producing passenger cars in 1953, although this production was limited to the 1950s and 1960s. In 1991, the company released the world's first commercially available hybrid transit bus. The company formed a business alliance with Toyota Motor in 1966 and officially became a subsidiary of Toyota in 2001, operating as one of the 16 major companies of the Toyota Group. In 2026, Hino merged with Fuso and became a subsidiary of Archion, a newly established holding company.

== History ==
=== Predecessors ===
Hino's predecessors trace back to the founding of Tokyo Gas Industry Company in 1910. In 1910, Chiyoda Gas Company was established and competed fiercely against incumbent Tokyo Gas Company for supplying natural gas to users. Tokyo Gas Industry was a parts supplier for Chiyoda Gas but it was defeated and merged into Tokyo Gas in 1912. Having lost its largest client, Tokyo Gas Industry Co. broadened its product line including electronic parts, and renamed itself as Tokyo Gas and Electric Industry (東京瓦斯電気工業), TG&E, and was often abbreviated as Gasuden. It produced its first motor vehicle in 1917, the Model TGE "A-Type" truck. In 1937, TG&E merged its automobile division with that of Automobile Industry Co., Ltd. and Kyodo Kokusan K.K., to form Tokyo Automobile Industry Co., Ltd., with TG&E as a shareholder. Four years later, the company changed its name to Diesel Motor Industry Co., Ltd., which would eventually become Isuzu.

=== Foundation of Hino and Post-World War II history ===
In 1942, a new company called Hino Heavy Industry Co., Ltd. was spun out from Diesel Motor Industry Co., Ltd. During World War II, Hino manufactured Type 1 Ho-Ha half-track and Type 1 Ho-Ki armored personnel carrier for the Imperial Japanese Army. Following treaties signed at the end of World War II, the company had to stop producing large diesel engines for marine applications, so the company dropped the "Heavy" from its name and formally concentrated on the heavy-duty trailer-truck, buses and diesel engines markets, as Hino Industry Co., Ltd. The company took its name from the location of its headquarters in Hino city (日野市, Hino-shi) within Tokyo prefecture.

In 1948, the company spun itself into two entities, Hino Diesel Industry Co., Ltd and Hino Diesel Sales. In 1950 the heavy-duty TH10 was introduced, equipped with an all-new 7-liter DS10 diesel engine. An eight-tonner, this was considerably larger than existing Japanese trucks which had rarely been built for more than 6,000 kg (13,230 lb) payload. In 1952, the company introduced the B10/30 (Blue Ribbon) on a European style forward control cabin, a first for Japanese manufacturers. In 1953, it rolled off the ZG heavy truck which became the most sold dump truck in Japan. That year, Hino entered the private car market, by manufacturing Renaults under licence, and in 1961 it started building its own Contessa 900 sedan with an 893cc rear-mounted engine, and a pickup truck called the Hino Briska with the Contessa engine slightly enlarged and installed in the front with rear wheel drive. The Italian stylist Giovanni Michelotti redesigned the Contessa line in 1964 with a 1300 cc rear-mounted engine. Fed by two SU type carburettors, this developed 60 hp (44 kW) in the sedan 70 hp (51 kW) in the coupé version.

In 1959, the company adopted the Hino Motors, Ltd. name.

In 1963, the Hamura factory began operations.

Hino Trucks have also been assembled in Norway (1977–85), Portugal and Canada.

=== Amalgamation with Toyota ===
Hino was in financial difficulties in the 1960s. In October 1966, following some pressure for industry consolidation from the Japanese government, Hino and Toyota signed a partnership agreement (through the Mitsui Bank) by which the former became an affiliate of the latter and focused itself on truck and bus production alongside vehicle assembly under contract. In April 1967, Hino began assembling light vehicles for Toyota, after an influx of employees from the latter to the former. The Hino Briska pickup was rebadged as the Toyota Briska and, in March 1968, the model was used to develop the Toyota HiLux which had more stock parts from Toyota. Hino also assembled the Publica van and sedan. Both companies started to collaborate in purchasing as well as research and development. Hino officially stopped assembling passenger cars in 1969, although continued assembling light vehicles for Toyota (as the Publica van and the HiAce). Up until the 1990s, Hino assembled the HiLux.

In the 1960s, Hino launched new medium and heavy duty trucks (TC300, KF). In March 1964, the company launched the medium duty KM series truck, later named the Ranger.

In the 1970s, Hino introduced the so-called "red" diesel engines with a focus on fuel efficiency and incorporating MAN technology. The company began to increase exports as it had an efficiency advantage compared to most foreign rivals at the time. By the end of the 1970s, export sales surpassed domestic ones. In 1977, Hino launched its first long range coach. In 1981, the company introduced the Profia, the first truck of a new series with improved aerodynamics, engines and cabin.

In the late 1970s, Hino started to form partnerships with other manufacturers besides Toyota. In 1978, it established a technical assistance agreement with Asia Motors. That same year, it established a partnership with the Chinese car manufacturer FAW by providing technical assistance on medium trucks to it, mostly for improving FAW's outdated Jiefanghao range (based on the 1940s ZIS-150). In 1986, it started to license its engines to Ashok Leyland.

Starting in the 1990s, Hino returned to financial difficulties. The company introduced new heavy vehicles (trucks and coaches) and expanded its Asian business to try improving its profitability. Toyota also helped its affiliate by giving it assembly contracts (Toyota Tercel/Corsa, Toyota T100). In March 1997, Toyota increased its Hino stake (at the time 11.4%) to 16.4% and to 20.1% by the end of the year. Toyota also moved all its production and development activities for light trucks to Hino.

In June 1998, Toyota said it planned to take control of Hino. By March 2001, it had acquired a 36.6% Hino stake. Later that year, Hino became a subsidiary of Toyota after the latter increased its ownership to a 50.1% majority stake.

In 2002, Hino and Isuzu merged their bus/coach production and development facilities in Japan into a joint venture called J-Bus. In March of that year, Hino and Scania AB signed a partnership deal by which the former was to take charge of the Japanese sales of the latter. The deal also included the possibility of further technical and commercial collaboration. In December 2006, Scania started to sell Hino trucks in South Korea. In June 2011, Scania left the deal after it opened its own Japanese sales operation.

In 2012, Hino started to move medium and heavy truck production in Japan from its obsolete, cramped Hino plant to a new one in Koga, Ibaraki, which initially produced complete knock-down kits for export. The move was completed in September 2017, as part of a consolidation of the Japanese operations into three main plants: Koga would produce medium and heavy trucks; Nitta (Ota, Gunma), which had already been manufacturing engines for light and medium vehicles and opened a new plant for large ones completed in December 2016 to replace the Hino plant, engines and transmissions; Hamura, lighter trucks and contract assembly for Toyota.

In 2018, Hino and Volkswagen Truck & Bus (later renamed Traton) announced a wide-ranging strategic partnership for activities including procurement, technologies and logistics. In November 2019, they established a procurement joint venture called Hino and Traton Global Procurement, with 51% of it owned by Traton and 49% by Hino. By 2023, the partnership was terminated.

In March 2021, Hino, its parent Toyota, and Isuzu announced the creation of a strategic partnership between the three companies. Toyota acquired a 4.6% stake in Isuzu while the latter plans to acquire Toyota shares for an equivalent value. The three companies said they would form a new joint venture by April called Commercial Japan Partnership Technologies Corporation with the aim of developing fuel cell and electric light trucks. Toyota would own an 80% stake in the venture while Hino and Isuzu would own 10% each. In August 2022, after Toyota published the findings of a self-commissioned investigation highlighting that Hino Motors falsified emissions data on some engines going back to at least October 2003, Toyota and Isuzu "expelled" Hino from their partnership. The Hino stake would be given to Toyota.

In May 2023, Hino and its parent Toyota signed a memorandum of understanding with Mitsubishi Fuso and its parent Daimler Truck for a plan of merging Hino and Mitsubishi Fuso into a publicly traded holding company with equal investment from both Toyota and Daimler Truck.

In June 2025, a definitive agreement was reached with an as yet unnamed holding company to list on the Tokyo Stock Exchange with Daimler Truck and Toyota each to own 25% of the holding company. In October 2025, the new name for the holding company was announced as Archion.

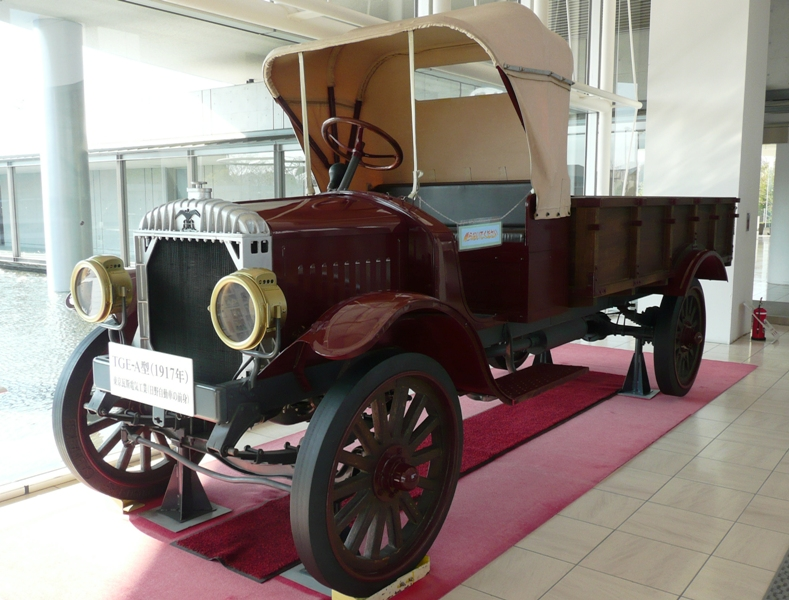
1917 TGE-A

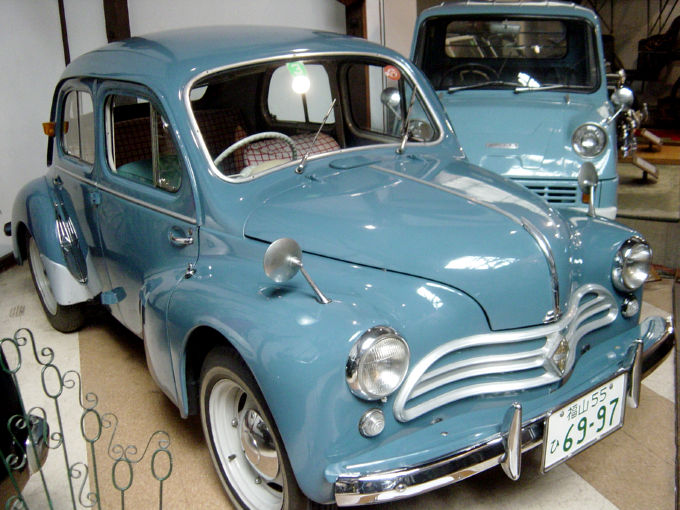
Hino Renault 4CV

Hino Contessa 1300

=== Canada ===
Hino has been marketing trucks in Canada since the 1970s. Hino Motors Canada Ltd., is the exclusive distributor of Hino products in Canada, and is part of the Toyota Group of Companies, with head office and Parts Distribution Centre in Mississauga, Ontario. In May 2006, Hino Canada opened a new 12,300 m^{2} (132,000 sq ft) assembly plant in Woodstock, Ontario, employing at first 45 (grown since to more than 70) and with an annual capacity of 2,400 trucks. It began assembly of Class 4 and 5 trucks in 2006 and continued to do so until 2010. Since then, it has been building only class 6, 7 and 8 trucks.

=== Colombia ===
Hino Motors Manufacturing Colombia (HMMC) is a partnership between the Mitsui group and the Colombia manager for the Hino brand, PRACO-Didacol S.A. The partnership assembles medium and heavy trucks, destined mainly to the export market for the Andinean and Central American countries. The factory was opened on 9 October 2007 in Cota, a municipality near the capital city of Bogotá. From this facility, the FCJ and Hino Dutro (300, 500 and 900 series) trucks are assembled. The Mitsui-Keiretsu is the principal shareholder and owner of this factory. The plant produced the 1000th unit in July 2009. The 20,000th truck was finished on 14 May 2014.

=== India ===
Hino and Ashok Leyland have had a cooperative agreement for engine production in India since 1986. In 2017, a new agreement was made between them to manufacture Hino's advance diesel engines in India and Hino will procure parts from the local market through Ashok Leyland's Network.

=== Indonesia ===
PT. Hino Motors Manufacturing Indonesia (HMMI) is strategic production base for ASEAN region. HMMI is in partnership between the Hino Motors, Ltd and PT. Indomobil Sukses Internasional, Tbk. The partnership assembles medium, heavy duty trucks, mainly for ASEAN market. The factory was opened in April 2003, evolving from PT. Hino Indonesia Manufacturing which was opened in October 1982. The factory is located on Purwakarta, West Java. Its sister company PT. Hino Motors Sales Indonesia (HMSI) is formed April 2003. Currently there are 41 dealerships and more than 100 branches, around the archipelago.

=== Ireland ===
Hino Trucks have been assembled in The Republic of Ireland since 1968 by J Harris on the Naas/Nangor Roads, Dublin.

=== Israel ===
Hino Motors signed a 10-year assembly agreement with Kaiser-Illin Industries of Haifa, Israel, in 1963. Assembly of the Contessa 900 started in 1964. Later, Briska 900 and 1300 and the Contessa 1300 sedan were assembled in Haifa as well. The Contessa was even used as a police car in Israel. During the years 1964–1965, Israel was Hino's second most important market for its Contessas. Israel exports amounted to ~10% of total Contessa production. After it was purchased by Toyota, the contract was terminated and the last Israeli Contessas rolled off the assembly line in March 1968. In total, over 8,000 Hino Contessa and Briska were assembled in Israel.

=== Mexico ===
In mid 2008, Hino Motors was said to be building a new truck assembly facility in Guanajuato, Mexico, serving international deliveries. The facility was reportedly built in an 80:20 partnership with Japanese trading firm Mitsui, opening in 2009 and with a production capacity for 1,200 of the Hino 500 series trucks per year.

=== Pakistan ===
Hinopak Motors was formed in 1985 by a diverse group of sponsors. These included Hino Motors, Toyota Tsusho, Al-Futtaim Group and PACO. In 1998, Hino Motors, and Toyota Tsusho Corporation obtained majority shareholding in the company after disinvestments by the other two founding sponsors.

Hinopak Motors manufactures and markets diesel trucks and buses in Pakistan. Hinopak Motors has gained 70% market share making it the largest manufacturer in medium and heavy-duty truck and bus industry in Pakistan. Hinopak Motors Head Office is located in S.I.T.E Industrial Area, Karachi, Sindh, Pakistan.

=== Philippines ===
In 1975, Hino has entered the Philippine market, and creating Pilipinas Hino, Inc. It was originally established for the manufacturing of buses and, later, trucks. In the 1970s, Hino had initially shipped vehicles to the country from Japan, before the creation of PHI.

In 2015, Pilipinas Hino, Inc. changed its name to Hino Motors Philippines Corporation.

=== Russia ===
In 2017, Hino Motors announced that it was going to open its first factory in Russia. The factory will begin producing trucks in 2019 and will have the capacity to produce 3,000 yearly.

=== Thailand ===
Thai Hino Industry Co., Ltd. was established in 1964, with an assembly plant in Samrong. A second plant was established in Bang Phli in 1982. In 1999 the sales arm (Thai Hino Motor Sales Ltd.) and the manufacturing arm were merged, becoming Hino Motors (Thailand) Ltd. The company was split again in 2003, becoming Hino Motors Manufacturing (Thailand) Ltd. and Hino Motors Sales (Thailand) Ltd. A third plant was opened the following year, at Amatanakorn industrial park in Bang Pakong District (a vehicle assembly plant).

- Hino 300 Innovator light duty trucks for small business
- Hino 500 Dominator medium duty trucks for Agriculture business
- Hino 500 Victor heavy duty trucks for transportation business
- Hino 700 Splendor heavy duty trucks for international transportation business

=== United States ===
In the United States, Hino has operated since 1984. Hino Motors Manufacturing U.S.A., Inc. assembles medium-duty trucks at its Williamstown, West Virginia, plant. They opened a second plant in Mineral Wells, West Virginia in late 2018. Its manufacturing facilities in Ontario, California, and Marion, Arkansas, produce axles, knuckles, and suspension components for Toyota's Tacoma, Tundra, and Sequoia models. Hino's Parts Distribution Center in Mira Loma, California, supplies Latin American and Caribbean distributors with genuine Hino service parts. The 18,000 m^{2} (194,000 sq ft) assembly plant in Williamstown, West Virginia, assembles Class 6-7 Hino trucks at an annual capacity of 10,000 units. The plant was opened in November 2007 and employs about 200.

The plant in Long Beach, California, where Hino's US-based medium duty truck production had begun in 2004, was closed in 2007 and its production was transferred to the West Virginia facility. Production in West Virginia began with Class 4-7 trucks but the Class 4-5 products were dropped after 2010 model year and the plant now focuses on Class 6-7 products. Opened in 2016, Hino operates a distribution center in Gahanna Ohio.

Hino partnered with SEA Electric to provide Hino electric trucks using the SEA-Drive powertrain. The trucks are scheduled to become available in 2024 in the United States. SEA Electric has been installing its electric powertrains in medium and heavy-duty trucks and buses since 2017.

Hino's US headquarters are currently located in Novi, Michigan.

=== Vietnam ===
In Vietnam, Hino Motors Vietnam Joint Venture Company is a truck manufacturer established in June 1996 on the basis of a joint venture between Hino Motors Corporation of Japan, Vietnam Automobile Industry Corporation and Sumitomo Corporation of Japan. The company's head office is located in HoangLiet Ward, Hoang Mai District, Hanoi.

== Facilities ==
=== Japan ===
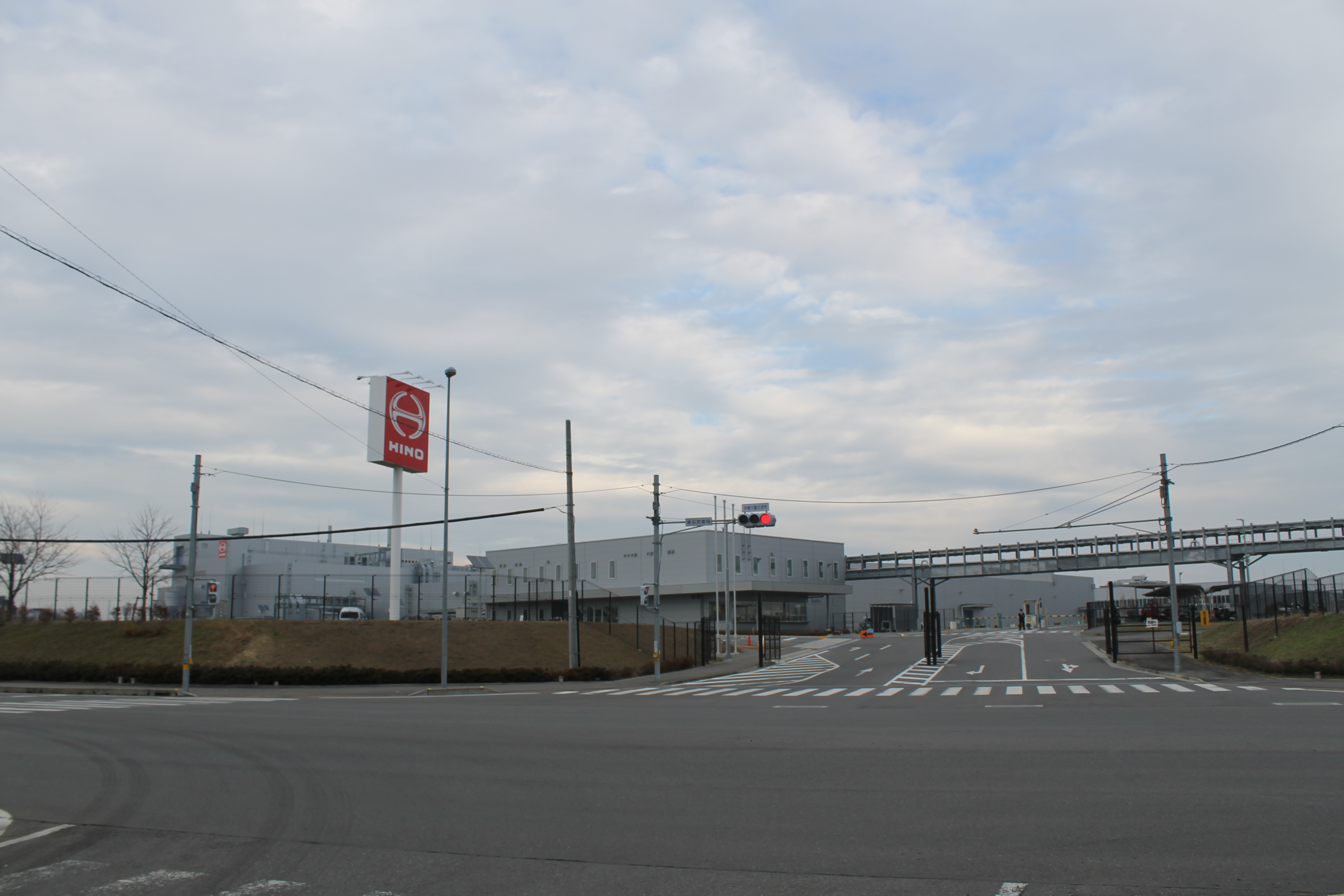
Koga plant, pictured in December 2018

Hino has four plants in Japan: Hino, Hamura, Nitta and Koga.

The Hino plant operates since the establishment of the company. Until 2016, it produced medium and heavy trucks and large diesel engines. In the 2016–2017 period, it was completely replaced by the Nitta and Koga plants for those, keeping since then only some activities related to vehicle parts. Hino plans to completely shut down the Hino plant by 2025. The plant site is about 300,000 m^{2} (3,200,000 ft^{2}). In December 2022, Hino said it wanted to sell one third of that land.

The Koga plant became fully operational in 2017, after gradually starting operations of its different production lines. The plant produces parts, axles, frames as well as medium and heavy trucks both as knock-down kits and as fully assembled units. The plant site is about 660,000 m^{2} (7,100,000 ft^{2}). The built area of the Koga plant is divided into five operations: knock down plant (26,000 m^{2}, 280,000 ft^{2}), axle plant (13,000 m^{2}, 140,000 ft^{2}), frame plant (12,000 m^{2}, 130,000 ft^{2}), cab plant (22,000 m^{2}, 240,000 ft^{2}) and vehicle assembly plant (61,000 m^{2}, 660,000 ft^{2}).

The Nitta plant was established in 1980. It produces axles, engines and transmissions. Up until late 2016, it only assembled small and medium engines while the large ones were by the Hino plant. By late 2016, the plant opened its own large engine assembly division, replacing the Hino one. The plant site is 390,000 m^{2} (4,200,000 ft^{2}). The plant itself covers 28,000 m^{2} (300,000 ft^{2}).

The Hamura plant started operations in 1963. It produces axles, light trucks and light vehicle contract assembly for Toyota. The plant site is 770,000 m^{2} (8,300,000 ft^{2}).

Hino has two test facilities within Japan (in Ibaraki, Osaka and Memuro, Hokkaido), various warehousing facilities (in Ōme, Tokyo, Sapporo and Koga), a museum and training facility (Hachiōji), a vehicle distribution facility (Hidaka, Saitama) and a technical center for clients (Hamura). The company owns about 24 dealerships in the country.

Apart from its directly controlled operations, Hino has various support subsidiaries in Japan. Trantechs, Ltd. is a truck bodywork manufacturer wholly owned by Hino, established in 2002 as a corporate spin off, part of the merging process of Hino's Hino Auto Body Industries (a company producing truck bodyworks and buses) into J-Bus for bus production. In December 2021, Trantechs opened a 15,600 m^{2} (170,000 ft^{2}) bodywork plant within the Koga plant complex. The subsidiary also owns a bodywork plant in Hakusan, Ishikawa where it has its headquarters. Hino has various parts producing subsidiaries which supply Hino itself and other clients: Takebe Tekkosho Co., Ltd. (plants in Atsugi and Thailand), Sohshin Co., Ltd. (Iruma and Tokigawa, Saitama), Fukushima Steel Works Co., Ltd. (Fukushima and Sagamihara), Rikken Forge Co., Ltd. (Maebashi and Isesaki), Meiyu Kiko Co., Ltd. (Nirasaki, Yamanashi), Yoshizawa Ironworks Co., Ltd. (Kōshū, Yamanashi) and Serio Co., Ltd. (Komatsu, Ishikawa). Other subsidiaries are Hino Global Logistics, Ltd. (logistics); NEXT Logistics Japan, Ltd. (logistics); Nissha Butsuryu Co., Ltd. (logistics); Hino Trading, Ltd. (trading); Hino Retrux, Ltd. (remanufacturing); Hino Technical Service Co., Ltd. (Hino technical manuals and related material); Hino Hutech Co., Ltd. (outsourcing services); Hino Computer System Co., Ltd. (computer maintenance services); Hino Harmony, Ltd. (facility maintenance); Hino Engineering Annex, Ltd. (vehicle repairing and modification); CUBE-LINX Co., Ltd. (management services); Saichu Co., Ltd. Hino has about ten affiliates in Japan, including J-Bus.

From March 2019 onwards, Hino owns a minority stake in MONET Technologies Inc., a mobility services joint venture established by Toyota and Softbank.

=== Overseas subsidiaries and affiliates ===
This an incomplete list of Hino's subsidiaries and affiliates outside Japan:

- Hino Motors Canada, Ltd.—see Toyota Motor Manufacturing Canada
- Hino Motors Sales U.S.A.
- Hino Motors Manufacturing Colombia
- Harris Hino, Ireland
- Hinopak Motors, Pakistan
- Hino Motors Philippines Corporation (Pilipinas Hino, Inc.)
- Samco (Vietnam)
- Hino Motors Manufacturing Indonesia
- Hino Motors Sales Indonesia
- Hino Motors Manufacturing USA
- Hino Motors Manufacturing (Thailand) Ltd.
- Hino Motors Sales (Thailand) Co., Ltd.
- Hino Motors Vietnam

== Leadership ==
- Matsui Makoto (1942–1945)
- Shoji Okubo (1946–1961)
- Masanobu Matsukata (1961–1974)
- Masashi Arakawa (1974–1983)
- Shunyu Fukasawa (1983–1987)
- Tomio Futami (1987–1997)
- Hiroshi Yuasa (1997–2001)
- Tadaaki Hegawa (2001–2004)
- Shoji Kondo (2004–2008)
- Yoshio Shirai (2008–2013)
- Yasuhiko Ichihashi (2013–2017)
- Yoshio Shimo (2017–2021)
- Satoshi Ogiso (2021–2025)
- Satyakam Arya (2025–present)

== Products ==
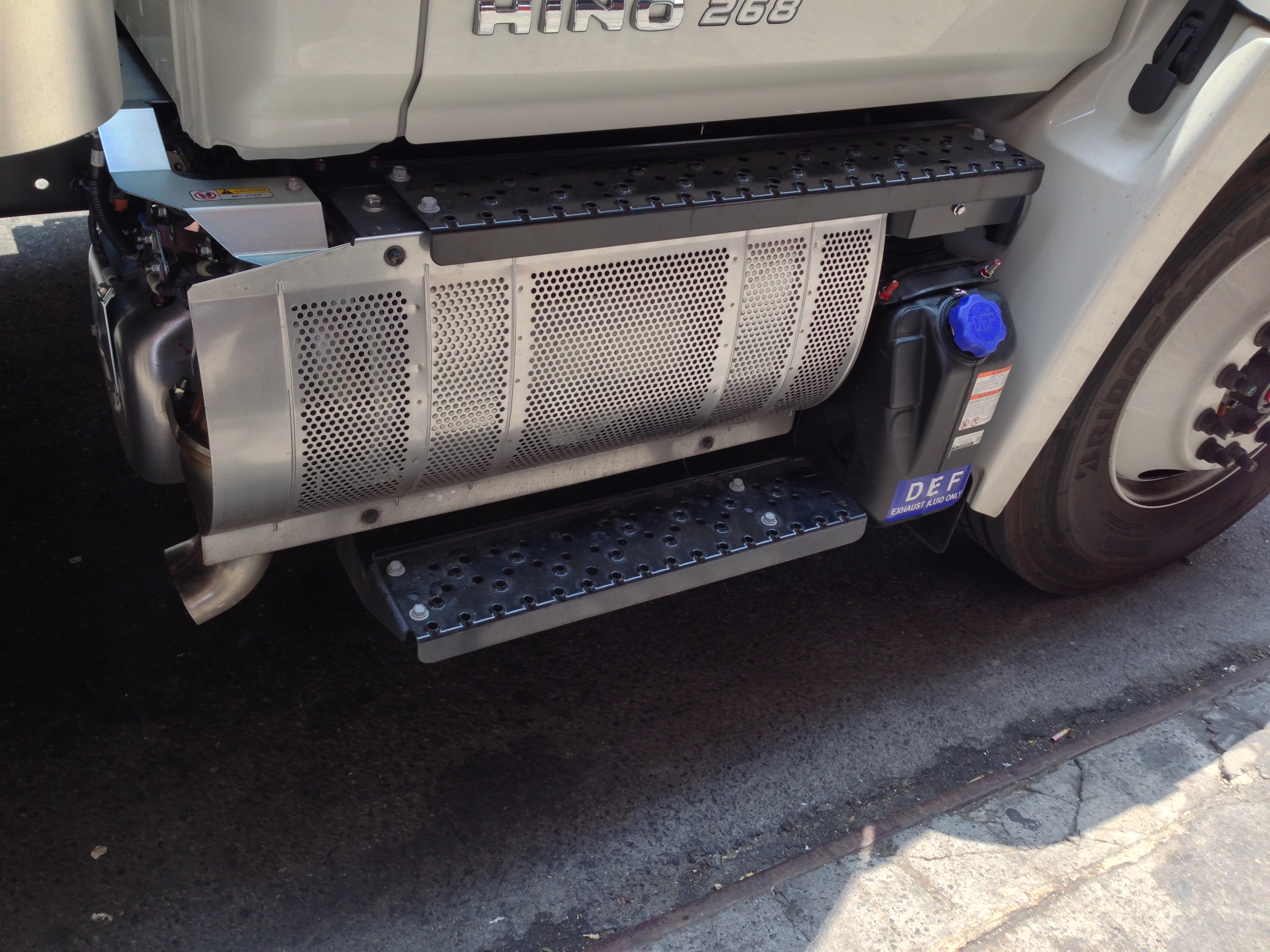
Hino truck and its selective catalytic reduction (SCR) next to the DPF with regeneration process by the late fuel injection to control exhaust temperature to burn off soot

=== Trucks ===
- Hino TH-series: a heavy duty bonneted truck, sold from 1950 until discontinued in favor of cab-over trucks in 1968.
- Ford N Series trucks (sold 1980–1998 in Oceania) These were badge-engineered Hino Ranger models.
- Profia (previously Super Dolphin Profia), sold as Hino 700 for export: heavy duty truck
- Bonneted medium truck (for North America): coded Hino 600.
- Dutro: light truck, also sold as Hino 300, Toyota Dyna, and Toyota Toyoace (hybrid version available)
- Ranger 2 FA, FB, FC: light trucks replaced by Dutro.
- Ranger: also sold as Hino 500, medium to heavy truck
  - The Ranger KL was first introduced in 1969
  - The 2nd generation was launched in 1980
  - The 3rd generation of 1989 is called Rising Ranger and Cruising Ranger.
  - The latest 4th generation (Ranger Pro) came in 2002 (hybrid version available)

The first generation Ranger KL spawned into KM, KR, and other variants in Australia.

- 155 Class 4: light duty truck
- XL: class 7/8 heavy trucks for the US and Canada
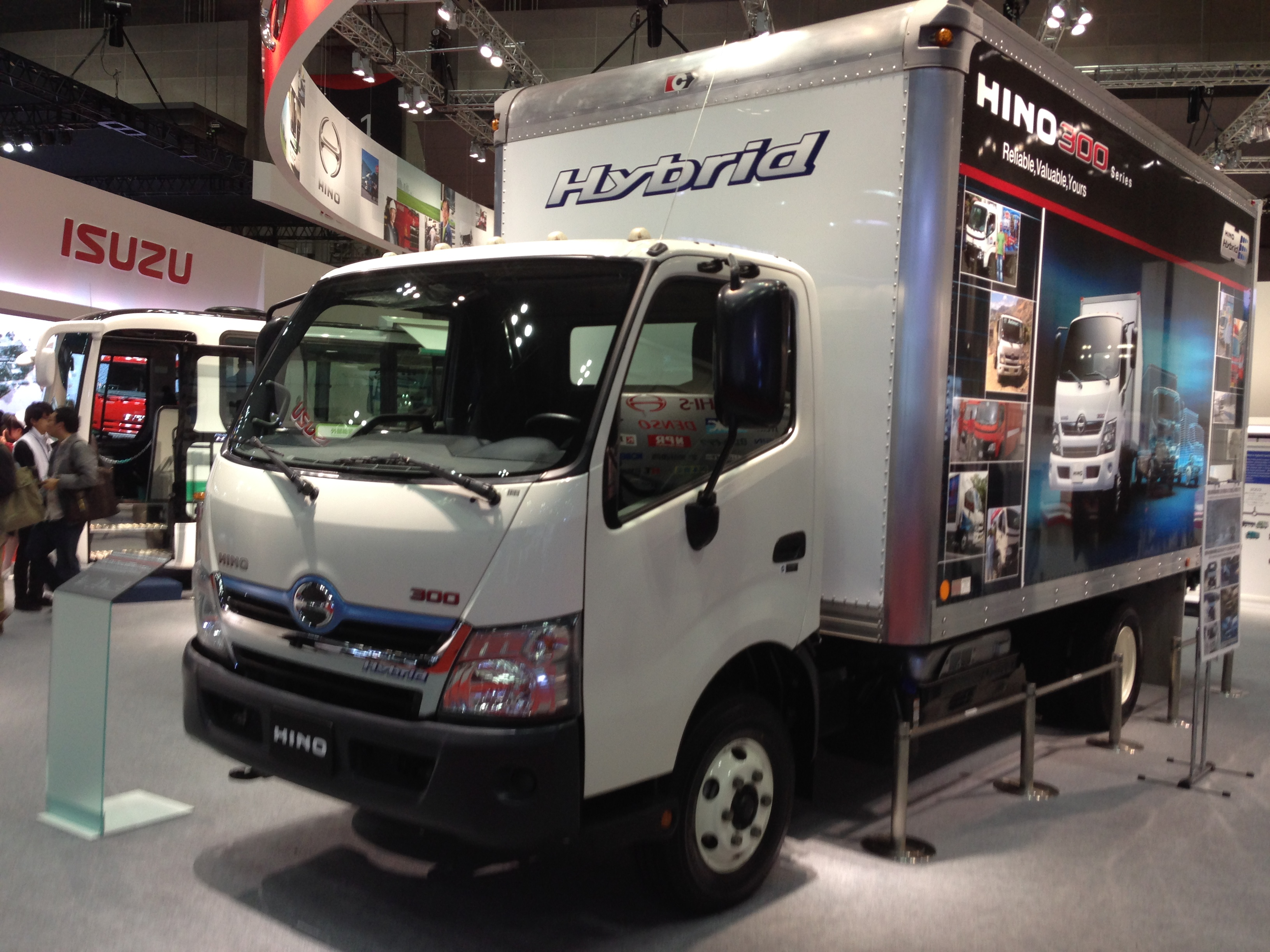
Hino 300 Series Hybrid (US spec)

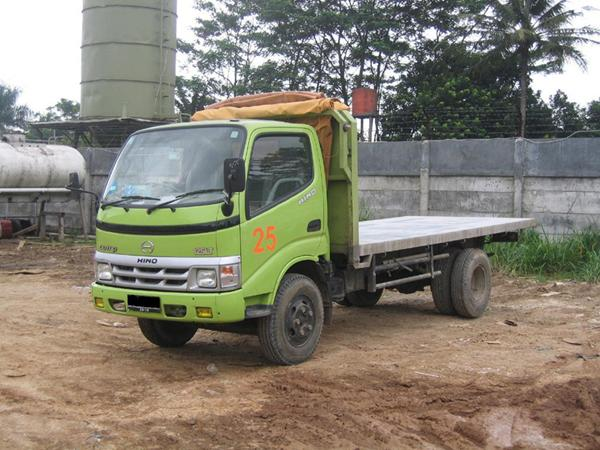
Hino Dutro 125LT

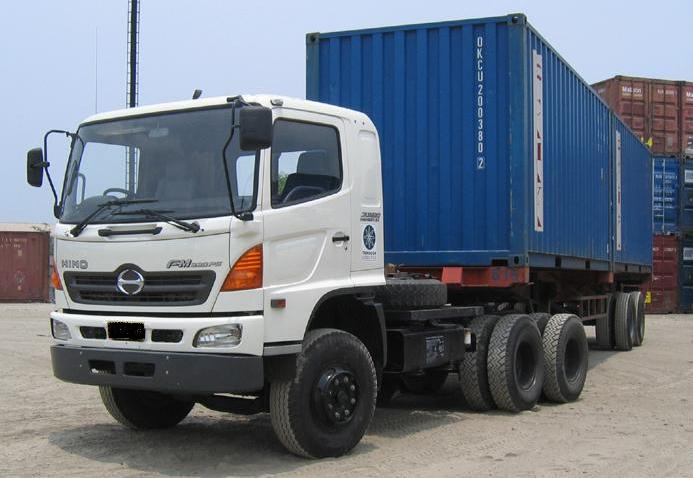
Hino Jumbo Ranger

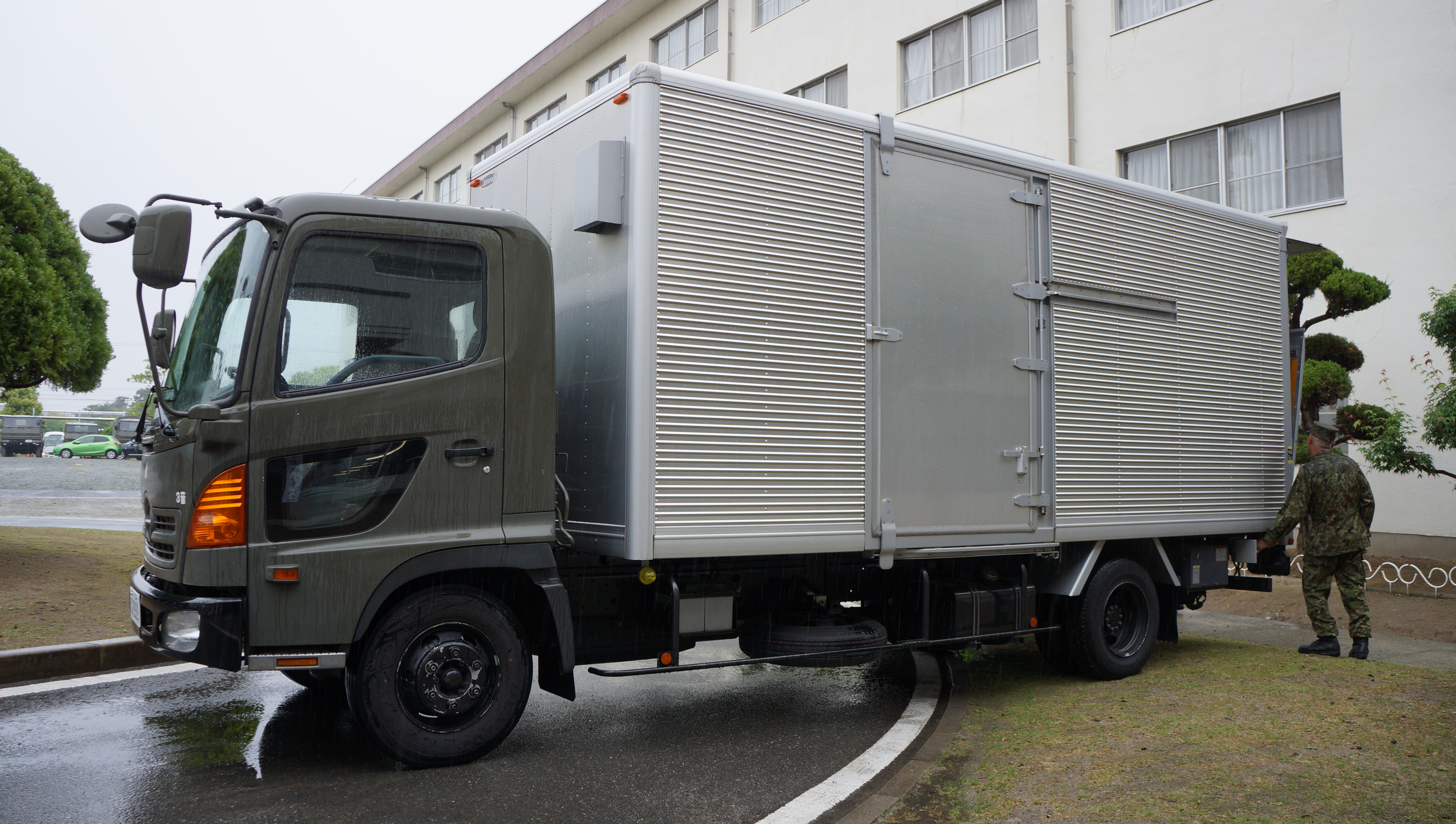
Hino Ranger commercial grade truck used by the JGSDF for peacetime/rear line duties

Hino also sold the European truck Scania R 420 in Japan, in an agreement with the Swedish brand which was discontinued in 2011.

=== United States and Canada ===
USA and Canada only conventional/bonneted trucks Hino 600:

- 145 Class 4: medium duty truck (discontinued)
- 165 Class 4: medium duty truck (discontinued)
- 185 Class 5: medium duty truck (discontinued)
- 238 Class 6: medium duty truck
- 258 Class 6: medium duty truck
- 268 Class 6: medium duty truck
- 338 Class 7: heavy duty truck
- 358 Class 7: heavy duty truck
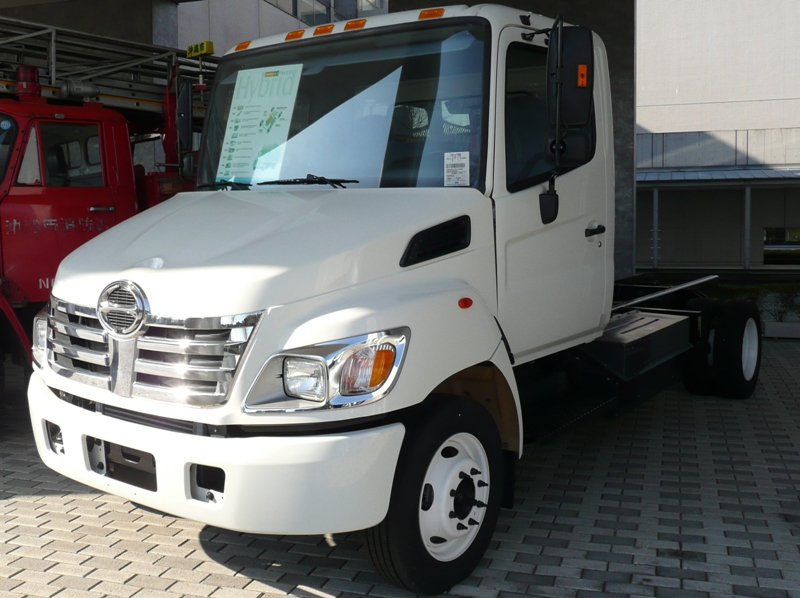
Hino 165 Hybrid

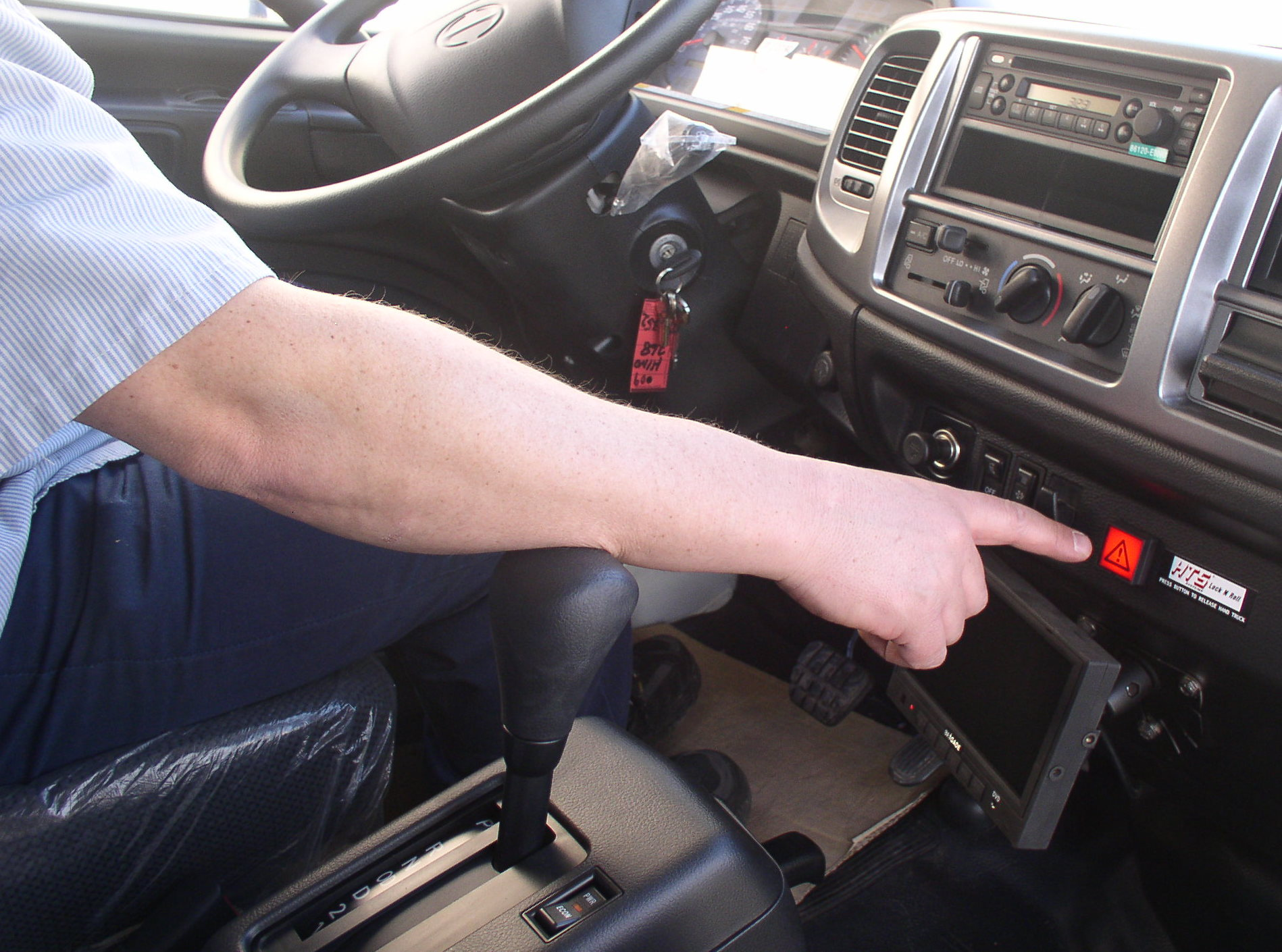
Hino 338 T dashboard

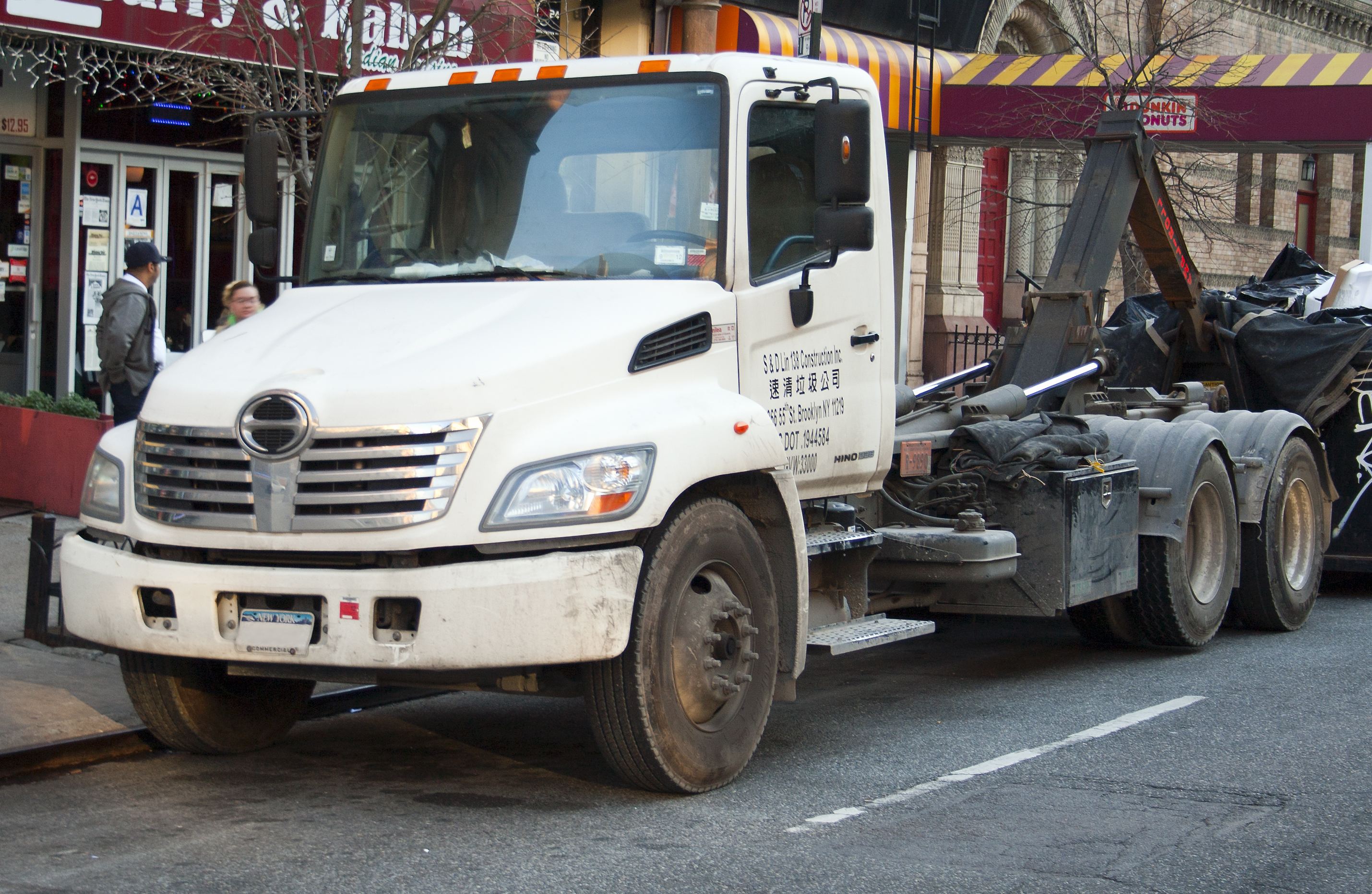
Hino 338 hook truck with an aftermarket pusher axle

=== Buses ===
- Poncho: Non-step light bus
- Liesse & Liesse II: light bus
  - The Liesse II is a rebadged Toyota Coaster.
- Blue Ribbon & Blue Ribbon II: city bus
  - The Blue Ribbon II is a rebadged Isuzu Erga.
- Rainbow & Rainbow II: medium bus
  - The Rainbow II is a rebadged Isuzu Erga Mio.
- Melpha: medium bus
- S'elega: luxury bus
  - The new model is offered as High Decker and Super High Decker.
- Front-engine chassis (FB, FC, GB, XZU): light bus
- Front-engine chassis (AK, FF, FG): big bus
- Mid-engine chassis (BG, BX, BT, CG, CM): big bus
- Rear-engine chassis (RC, RF, RG, RM, RK, RU, RV, RN, HT): big bus
- Front-engine Type C school bus chassis (Hino 338): Used in the production of the Starcraft Guardian
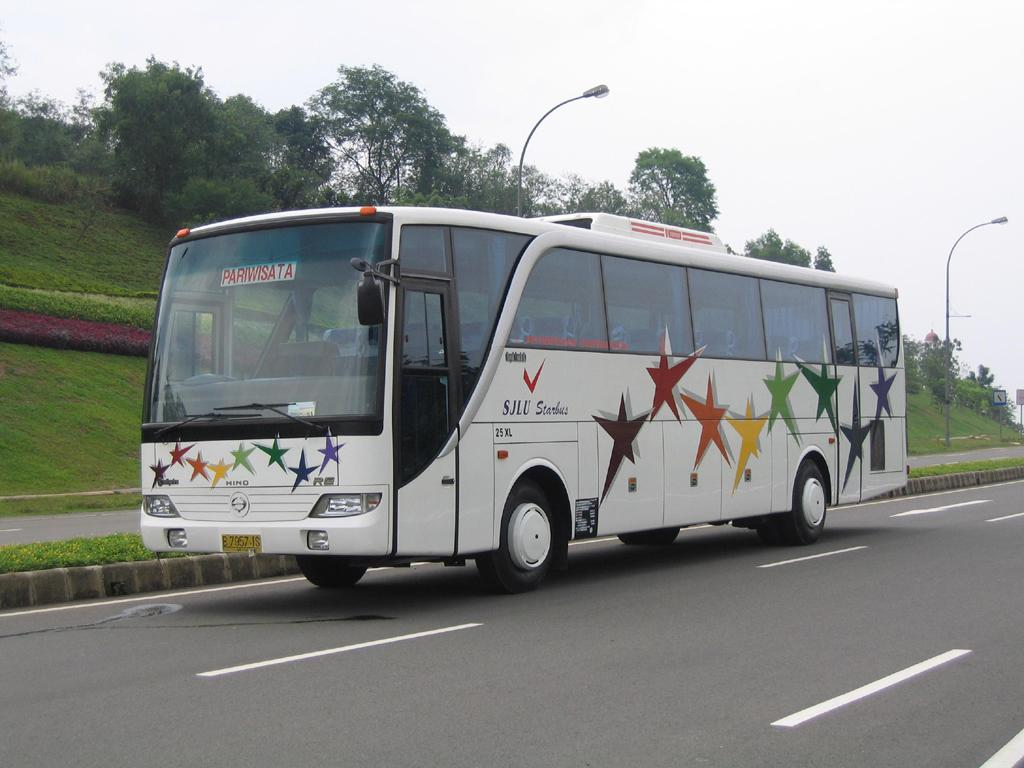
Hino RG Bus in Indonesia (operated by PT Sinar Jaya Langgeng Utama)

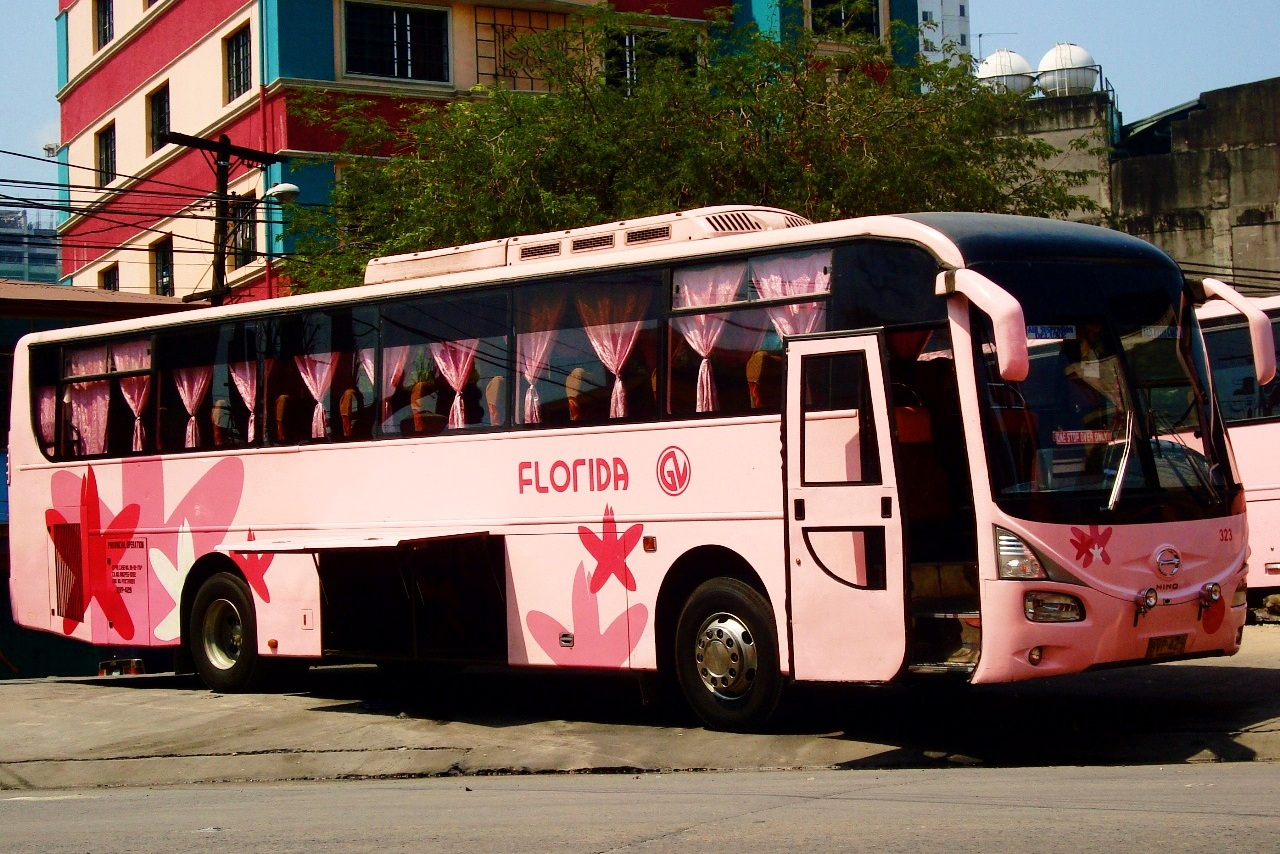
Hino RM Bus in the Philippines (operated by GV Florida Transport)

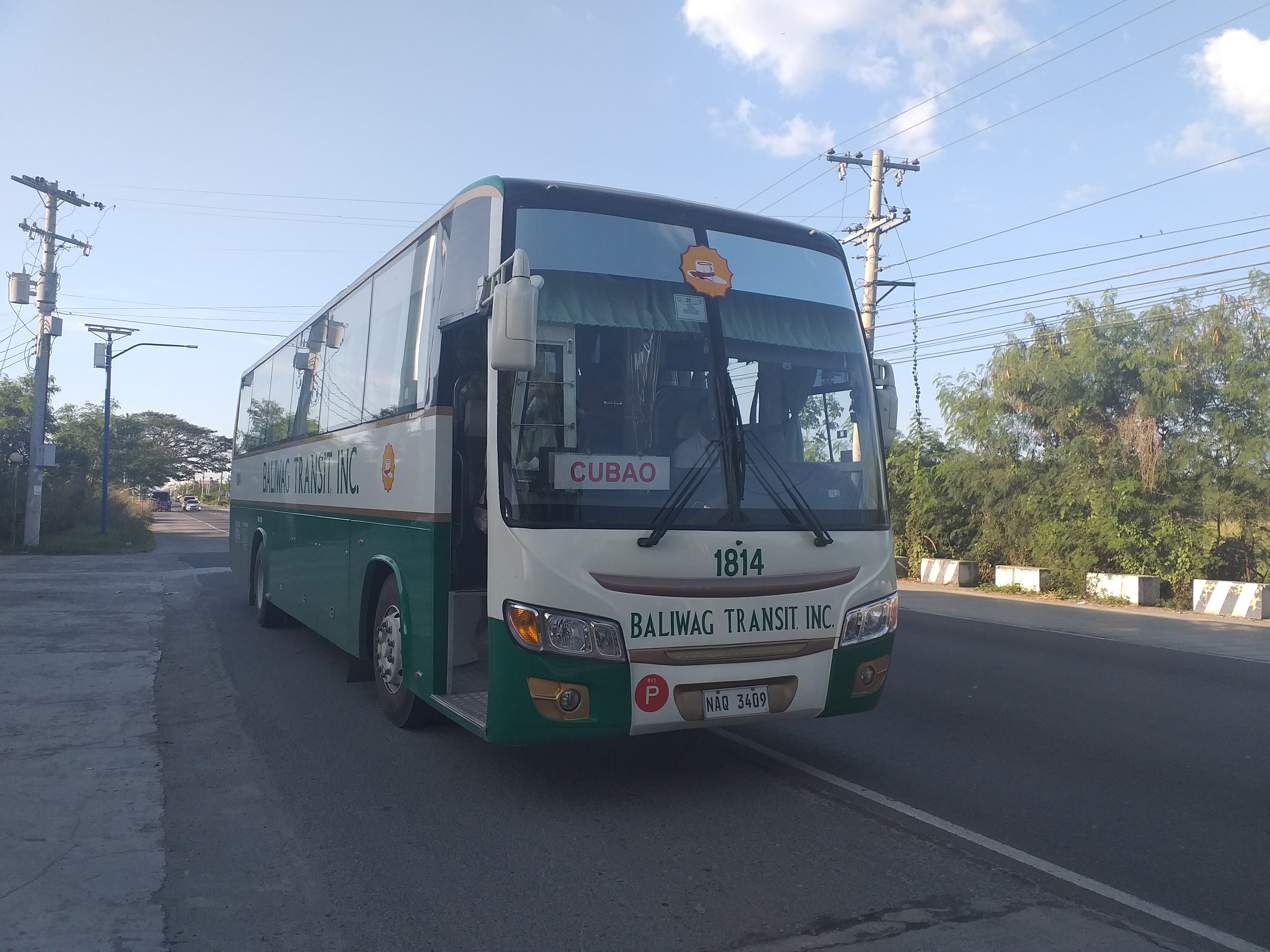
Hino RK Bus in the Philippines (operated by Baliwag Transit)

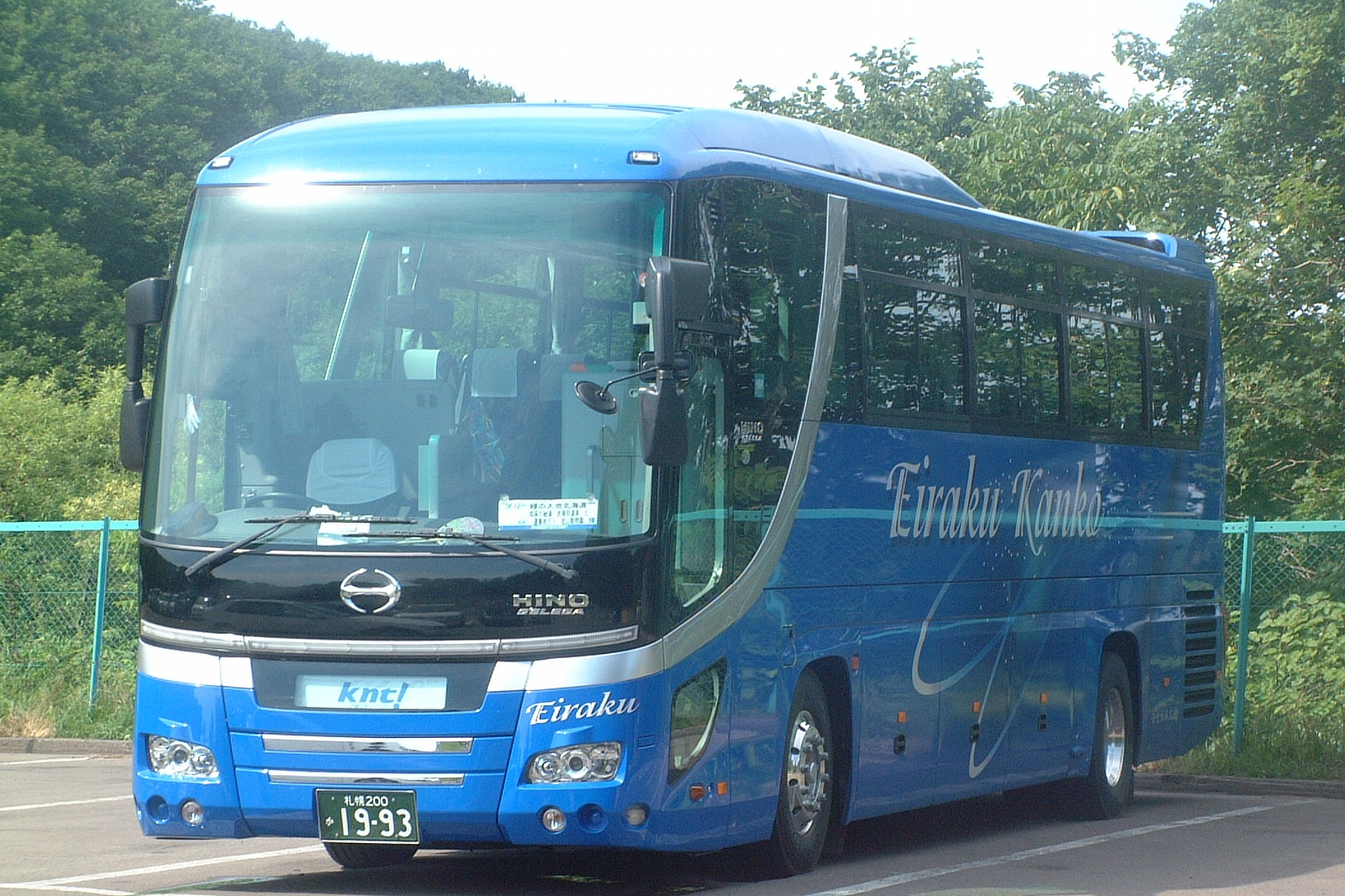
Hino S'elega Bus

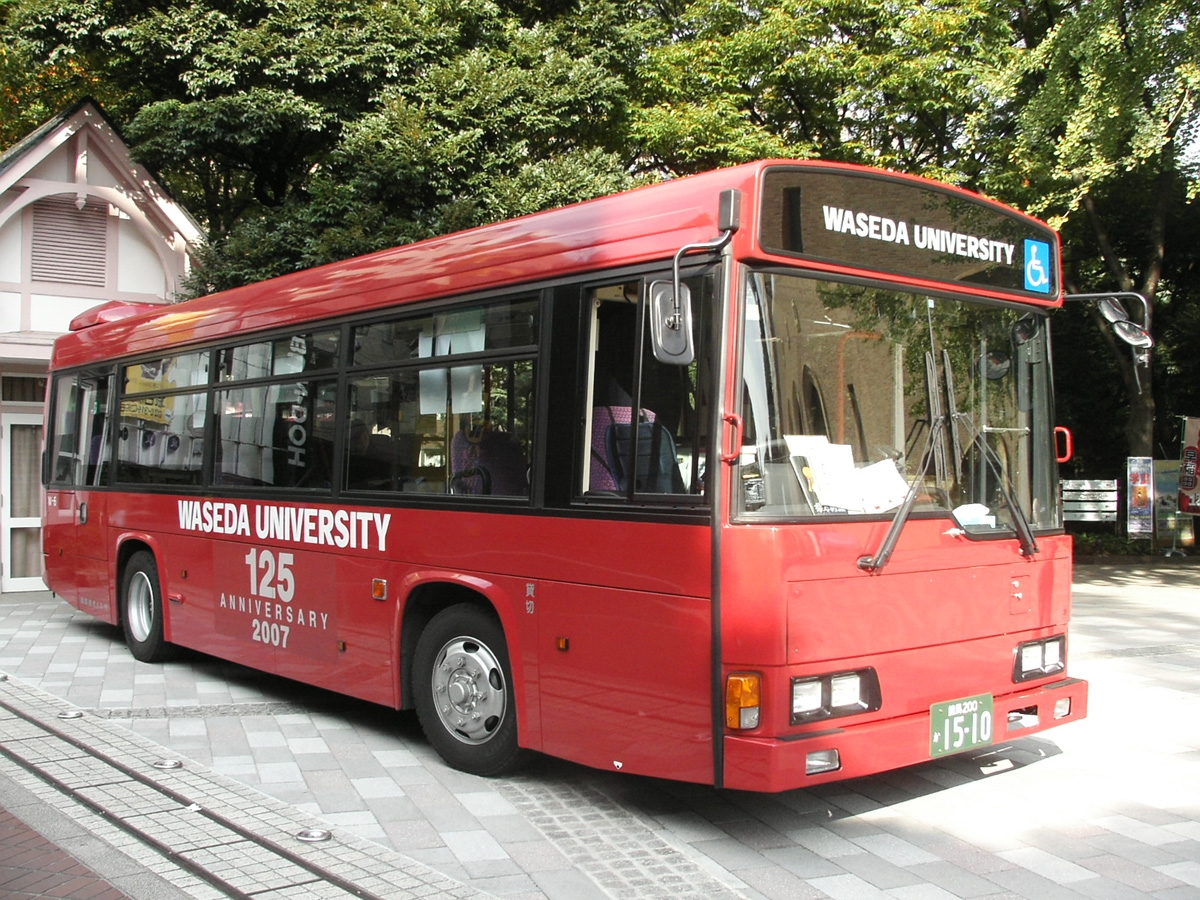
Hino Rainbow Bus

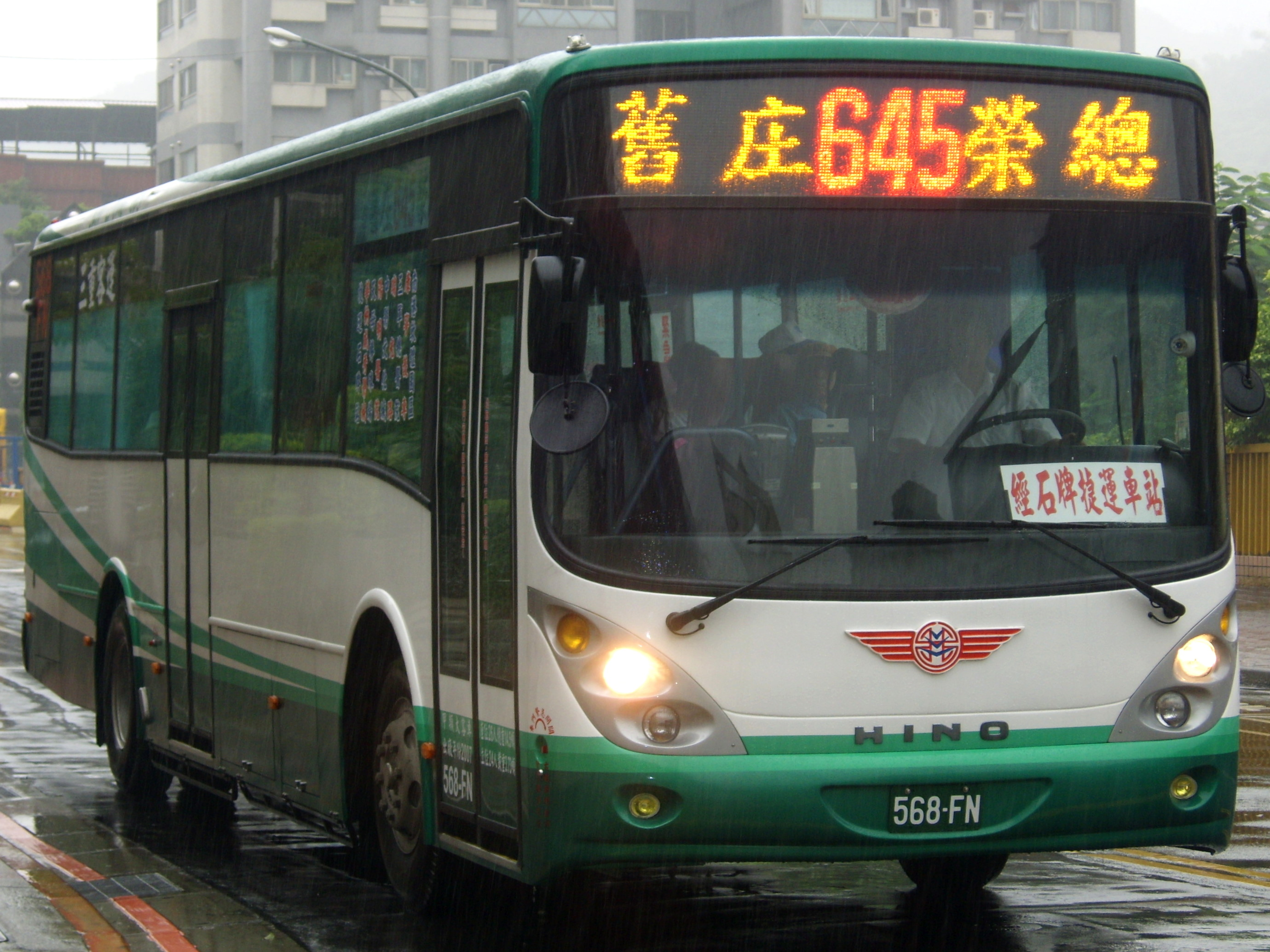
Hino RK Bus in Taiwan

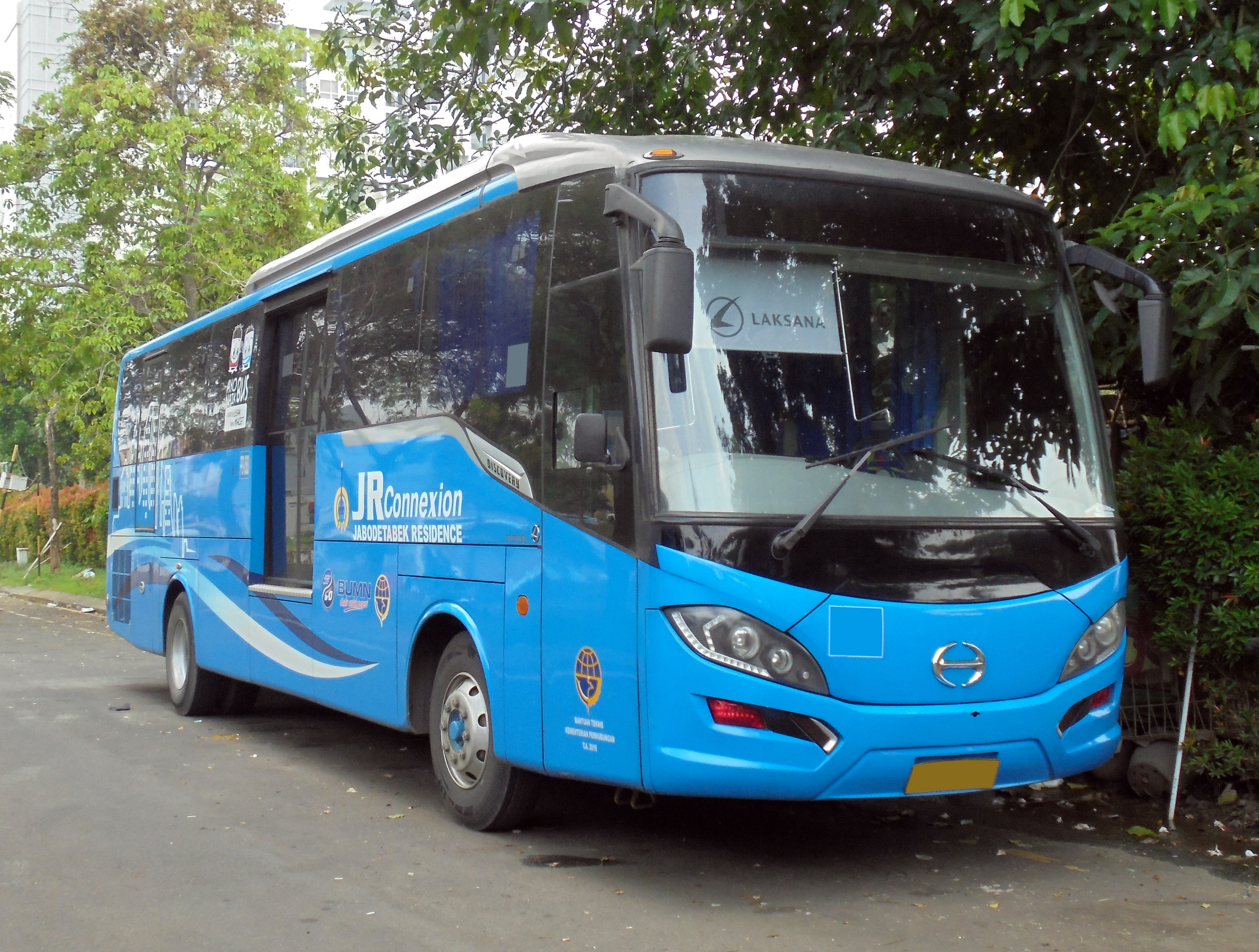
Hino RK Bus in Indonesia

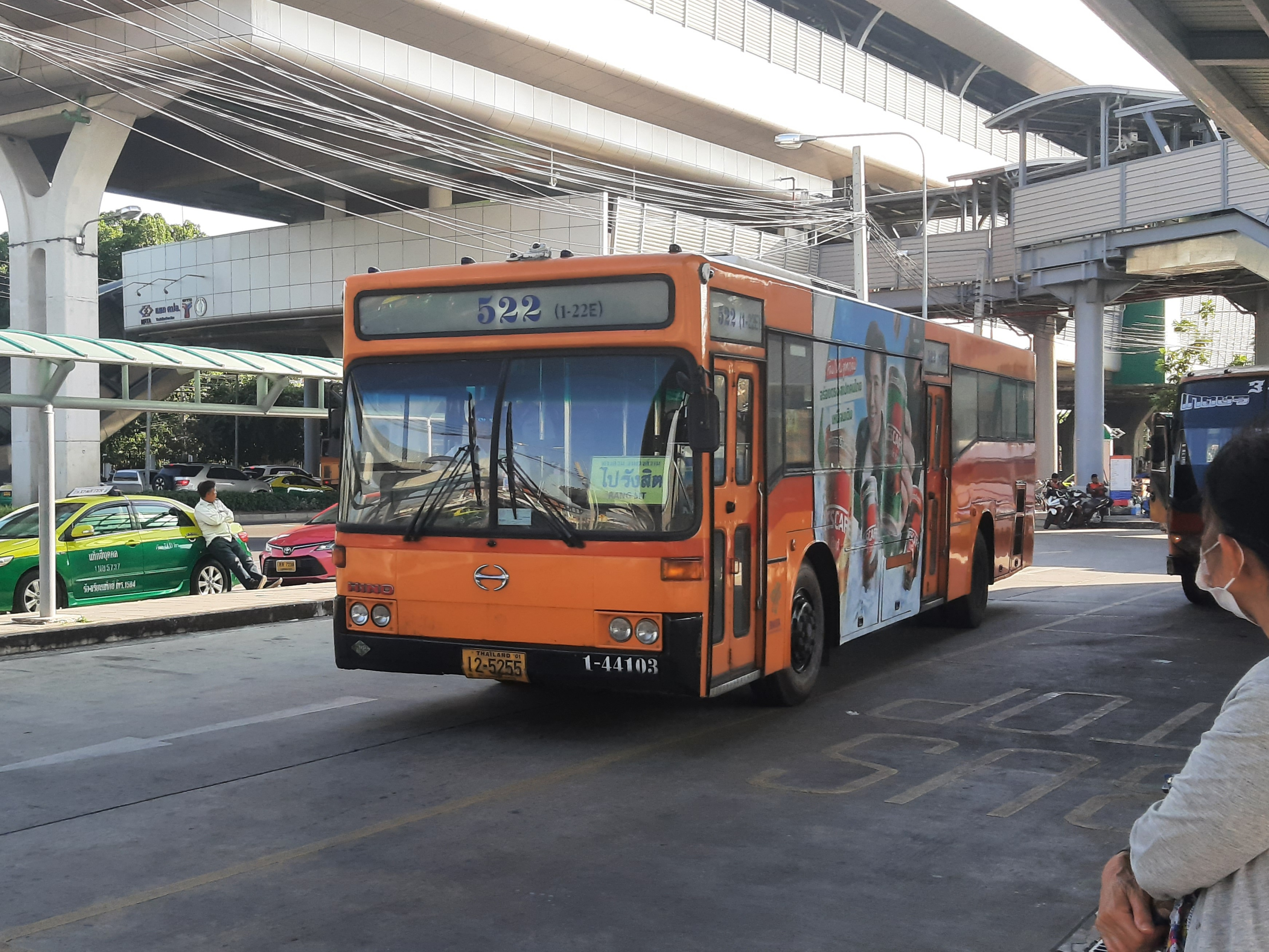
Hino RU1JSSL

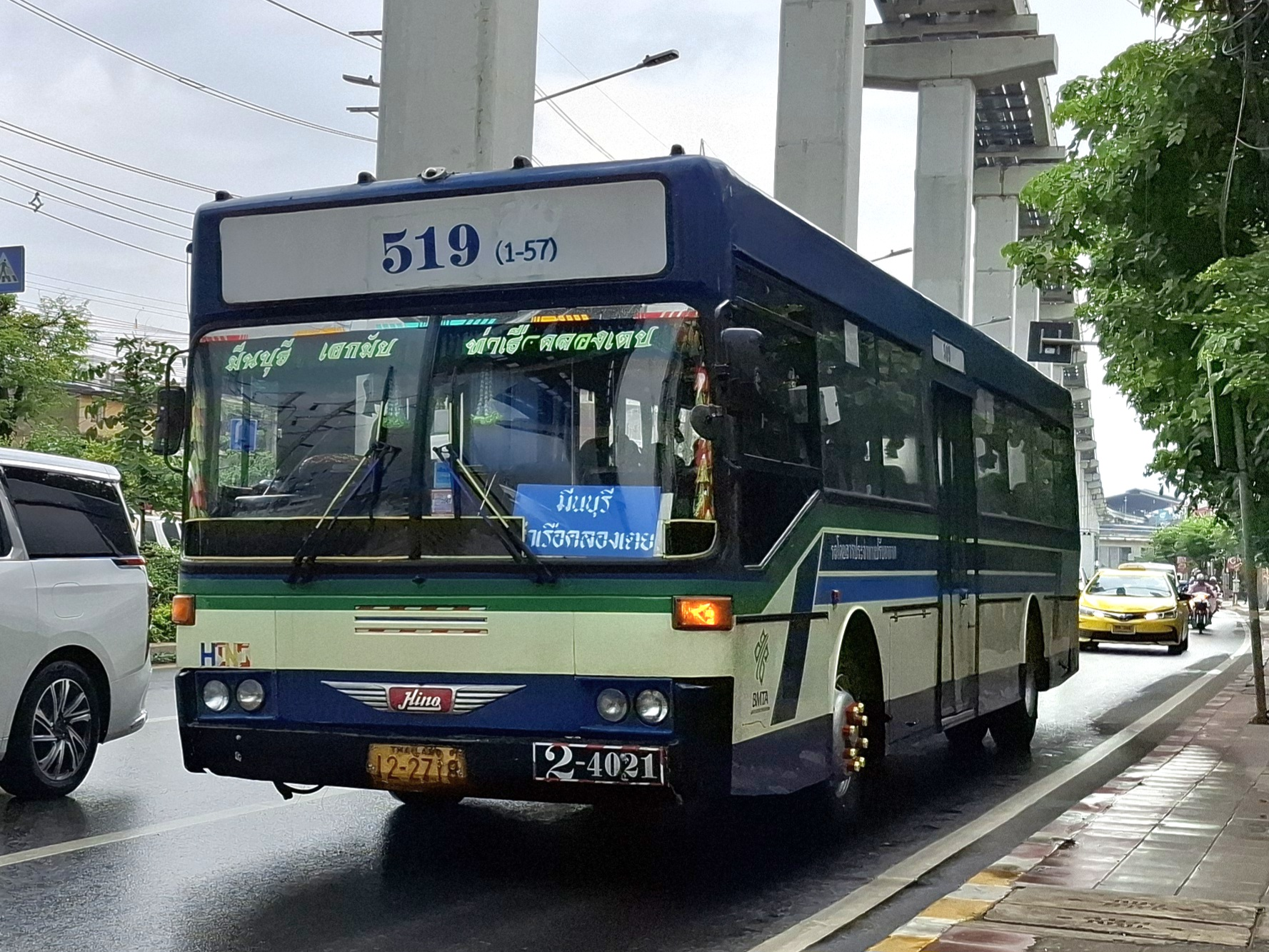
Hino HU3KSKL

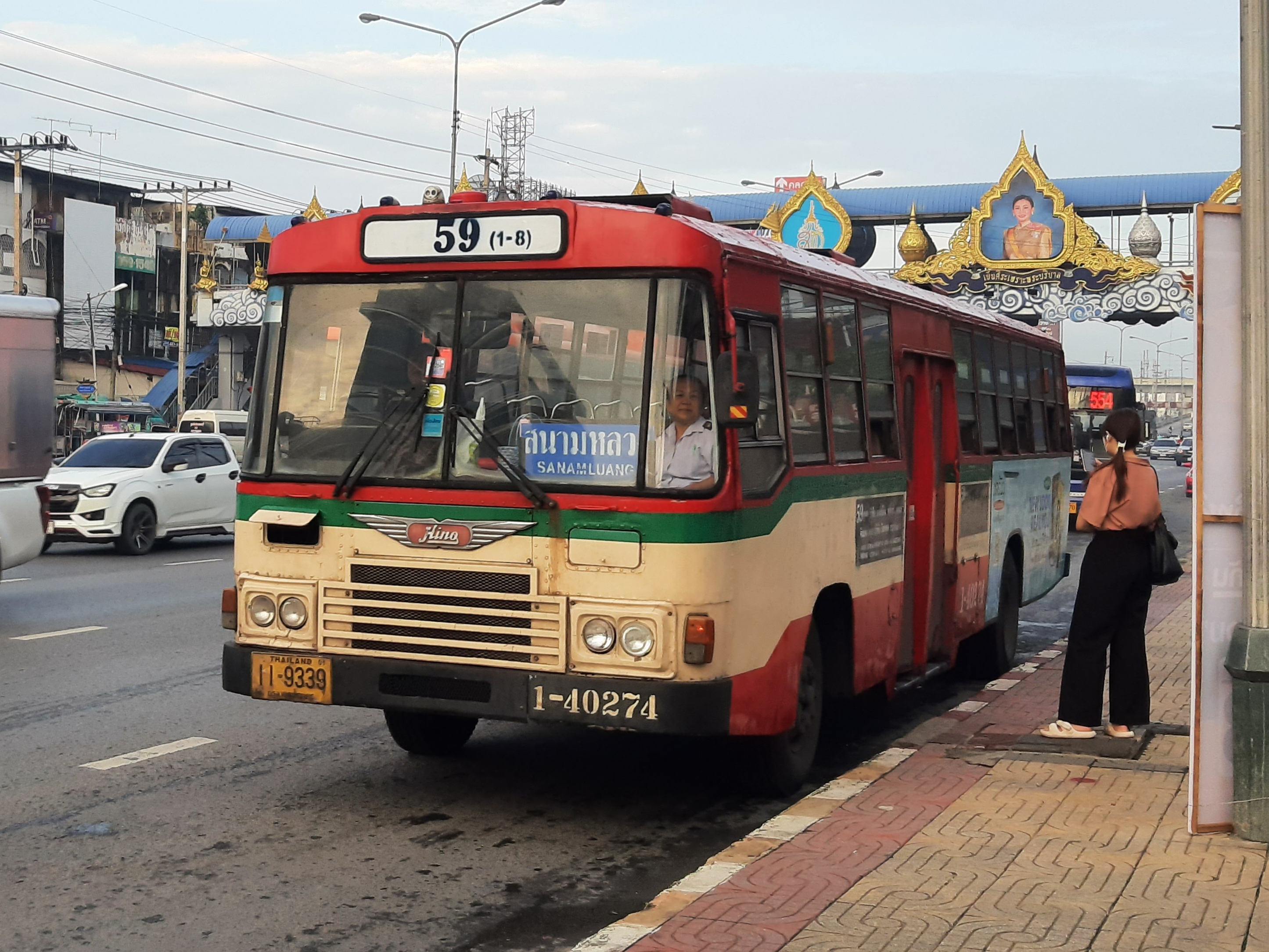
Hino AK176

=== Thailand ===
- AK176 (EH700)
- RU1JSSL
- HU3KSKL
- HU2ASKP-VJT
- BX320
- BX321
- BX340
- FD1JKC
- FD2JLB
- FDH2HLA
- FG8J
- RK1JSL
- HO7C

=== Philippines ===
- RC421(ER200)
- RF821(EK100)
- RM2KSS (K13D)
- RK3HS (H07D)
- RK1JMT (J08C-TK)
- RK1JST (J08C-TK)
- RM2PSS (P11C-TH)
- RU2PSS (P11C-TE)
- RK8JMUA (J08E-UB)
- RK8JSUA (J08E-UB)
- RN8J (J08E-UB)
- FB2W
- FB4J
- FC3J
- FC9JL7A (J05E-TY)
- FF3H (H06D)
- AK174 (EH700)
- AK176 (EH700)
- FG8JPSB (J08E-UG)
- FG1JPUB (J08C-F)
- FG1JPUZ (J08C-TT)
- FG8JPUB (J08E-UG)
- FG8JP7A (J08E-WF)
- HT223A (M10U)
- HT225A (M10U)

=== Fiji ===
AM100

- AC140 /W06D
- AB115A /W04D
- AK176K /EH700
- AK3HRK /H07D
- AK1JRK /J08C
- AK8JRK /J08E
- BX341 /EH700
- BY320 /EB300/ EM100
- BX321 /EH300
- RJ172A /EH700
- RR172A /EH700

=== Pakistan ===
- Roadliner Bullet
- Roadliner Supreme
- Rapidliner Deluxe
- Senator Pride
- Hino Splendor
- Citibus
- Urban Bus
- CNG Bus
- Citiliner Classic
- All Liner

=== Cuba ===
One small model for military and workers transportation (name of the model still unknown).

- RC 1971: Urbans (RC 300), Regulars (RC 300AP), Specials (RC 200P for long run travels with air condition)
- RV 850P 1977 and 1983 (400 buses)
- RU 1987 (one bus)
- NE 1977 (trucks)
- NF 1983 (trucks)

Others small trucks for food transportation.

=== Malaysia ===
- RE100
- BX300
- AK174K
- AK176K/EH700
- AK1JRKA/J08C-NA
- AK1JSKA
- AK3HRKA/H07D
- RK1JSKA/J08C-F
- RK1MSLL/EM100
- RK1JSLL/J08C-TK
- RM1ESKU/E13C-UT
- RM2KSKA/K13D-K
- RM1KSKU
- RK8JSKA/J08E-WM
- RN8JSKA/J08E-UF
- RN8JSNA/J08E-WK
- RN8JSPA/J08E-WM
- XZU720R/N04C
- Poncho Diesel
- Poncho ZEV

=== Cars ===
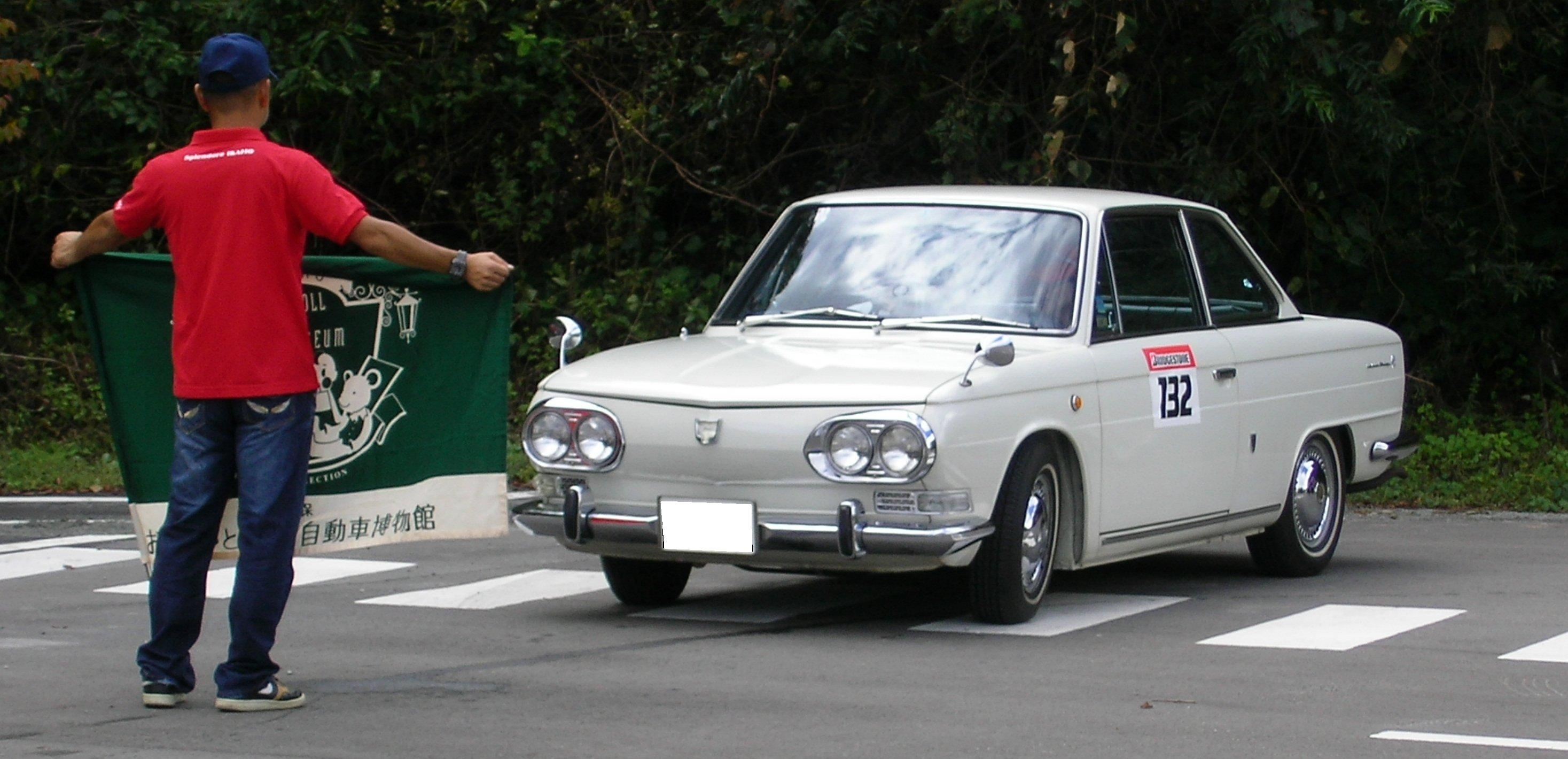
Hino Contessa 1300 coupe

- 4CV, built under license
- Briska, a small pickup built in the 1960s
- Contessa, passenger car built in the 1960s
- Toyota FJ Cruiser, SUV built for Toyota, 2006–2022.

=== Aircraft ===
The Tokyo Gas & Electrical Industry Co. Ltd. (Gasuden), a predecessor company, was responsible for the production of several aircraft types in the 1930s as listed below: (Tokyo Gasu Denki Kogyo KK - Tokyo Gas & Electrical Industry Co. Ltd.)

- Gasuden KR-1 Small Passenger Transport
- Gasuden KR-2 Small Passenger Transport
- Gasuden Model 1 Trainer
- Gasuden Model 2 Trainer
- Gasuden Model 3 Trainer
- Gasuden Koken Long-range Research aircraft
- Gasuden TR-1 Medium Passenger Transport
- Gasuden TR-2 Medium Passenger Transport

== Motorsport ==
"Team Samurai" entered a Contessa in the Trans Am Series in 1966 at the race at Riverside International Raceway. After being retired due to a collision, the team withdrew from the series.

Hino has competed in the Dakar Rally since 1991 with a Ranger FT 4WD truck driven by the Japanese rally driver, Yoshimasa Sugawara. Hino has always finished in the Top 10 in the Camion Category, and 1–2–3 overall in the 1997 event.

== Concept vehicles ==
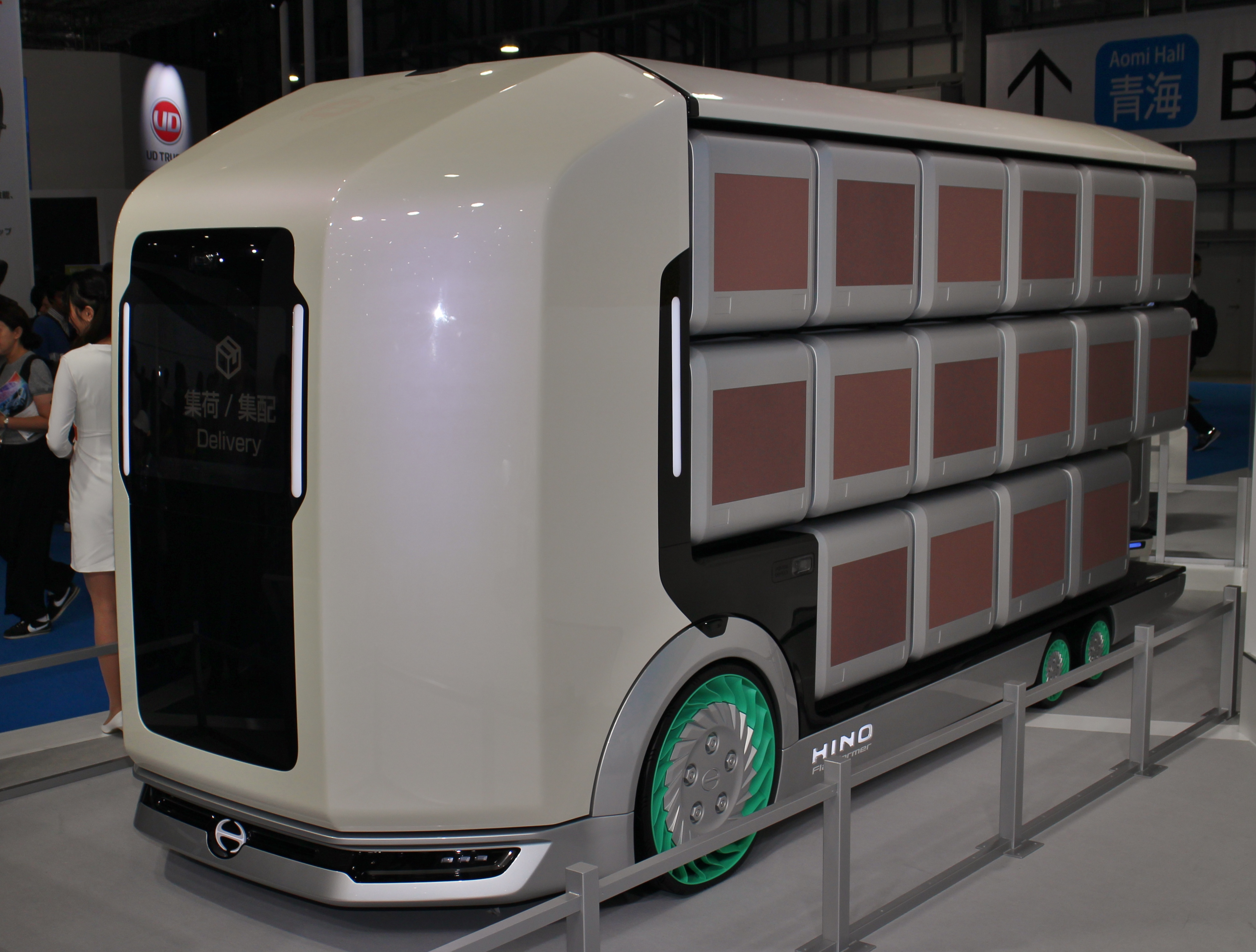
The Hino Flatformer employs a flat platform chassis co-developed with REE Automotive. Pictured with an interchangeable upper body with package delivery cubbies.

An autonomous modular concept vehicle, dubbed Flatformer, was co-developed by Hino and REE Automotive and displayed at the 2019 Tokyo Motor Show. The Flatformer features a flat chassis platform that can have different chassis bodies interchanged autonomously on top of it, such as a body with package delivery cubbies, a body providing retail services, and a body for shuttling passengers.

== Emissions Fraud ==
In January 2025, Hino was ordered to pay a total of $1.6 billion in fines after agreeing to plead guilty to charges of fraud in the US District Court in Detroit. The company admitted to falsifying emissions test data for over a decade and unlawfully selling heavy-duty diesel engines in the United States that did not meet emissions standards from 2010 to 2022.

== See also ==
- Daihatsu
