= Hinopak Motors =

Hinopak Motors Limited
- Type: Public
- Traded as: PSX: HINO
- Industry: Automotive
- Founded: 1985; 41 years ago
- Headquarters: Karachi, Pakistan,
- Area served: Pakistan
- Key people: Yoshihiko Nanami (CEO)
- Products: Trucks and buses
- Revenue: ▲ Rs. 13.185 billion (US$47 million) (2023)
- Operating income: ▼ Rs. 516.547 million (US$1.8 million) (2023)
- Net income: ▼ Rs. 16.033 million (US$57,000) (2023)
- Total assets: ▼ Rs. 9.138 billion (US$33 million) (2023)
- Total equity: ▲ Rs. 5.154 billion (US$18 million) (2023)
- Owner: Hino Motors (59.66%); Toyota Tsusho (29.80%)
- Number of employees: 763 (2023)
- Parent: Hino Motors
- Website: hinopak.com
- Footnotes; Financials as of 31 March 2023

Hinopak Motors is a Pakistani truck and bus assembler based in Karachi. It is a subsidiary of Japanese automotive company Hino Motors. Its assembly plant is located at S.I.T.E Industrial Area.

It is listed on the Pakistan Stock Exchange.

== History ==
Hinopak was formed in 1985 by Hino Motors, Toyota Tsusho, Al-Futtaim Group and Pakistan Automobile Corporation. In 1988, it was listed on the Karachi Stock Exchange.

In 1998, Hino Motors, and Toyota Tsusho Corporation obtained majority shareholding in the company after disinvestments by the other two founding investors. Hinopak Motors has a 70% market share in Pakistan, and gained its highest-ever after-tax profit in FY~2018-19.

== Operations in Pakistan ==
In 2021, HinoPak Motors signed a solar power purchase agreement with UAE-based solar energy company, Yellow Door Energy. The agreement aimed to reduce the company's reliance on grid power and offset approximately 15% of its energy consumption. Yellow Door Energy installed a 4.4 MW solar power system at HinoPak Motors' manufacturing plant in Karachi, which is expected to generate 6.8 million kWh of clean energy annually and reduce carbon emissions by approximately 5,200 tons per year. HinoPak Motors' sustainability efforts include reducing its carbon footprint and increasing energy efficiency.

Later in 2021, HinoPak announced a profit of Rs. 358 million. This is a significant improvement compared to the previous year when the company reported a loss of Rs. 713 million. The positive results were attributed to increased sales volume and improved operational efficiency.

== Products ==
=== Buses ===
- Hino Skyliner
- Hino Starliner
- Hino Superliner
- Hino Kazay
- RN8JSKA (Bus chassis)
- AK8J (Bus chassis)

=== Trucks ===
==== 300 series/Hino Dutro ====
- WU 640
- WU 720

==== 500 series/Hino Ranger ====
- Hino FG8J 4X2
- Hino FL8J 6x2
- Hino FM8J 6X4

==== Prime movers ====
- Hino FG8J 4X2
- Hino FM8J 6X4
- Hino FM2P 6x4

== CSR ==
HinoPak Motors manages a school under the Pakistan Corporate Social Responsibility Program.

== See also ==
- Hino Motors
