= Hino Poncho =

Japanese low-floor minibus

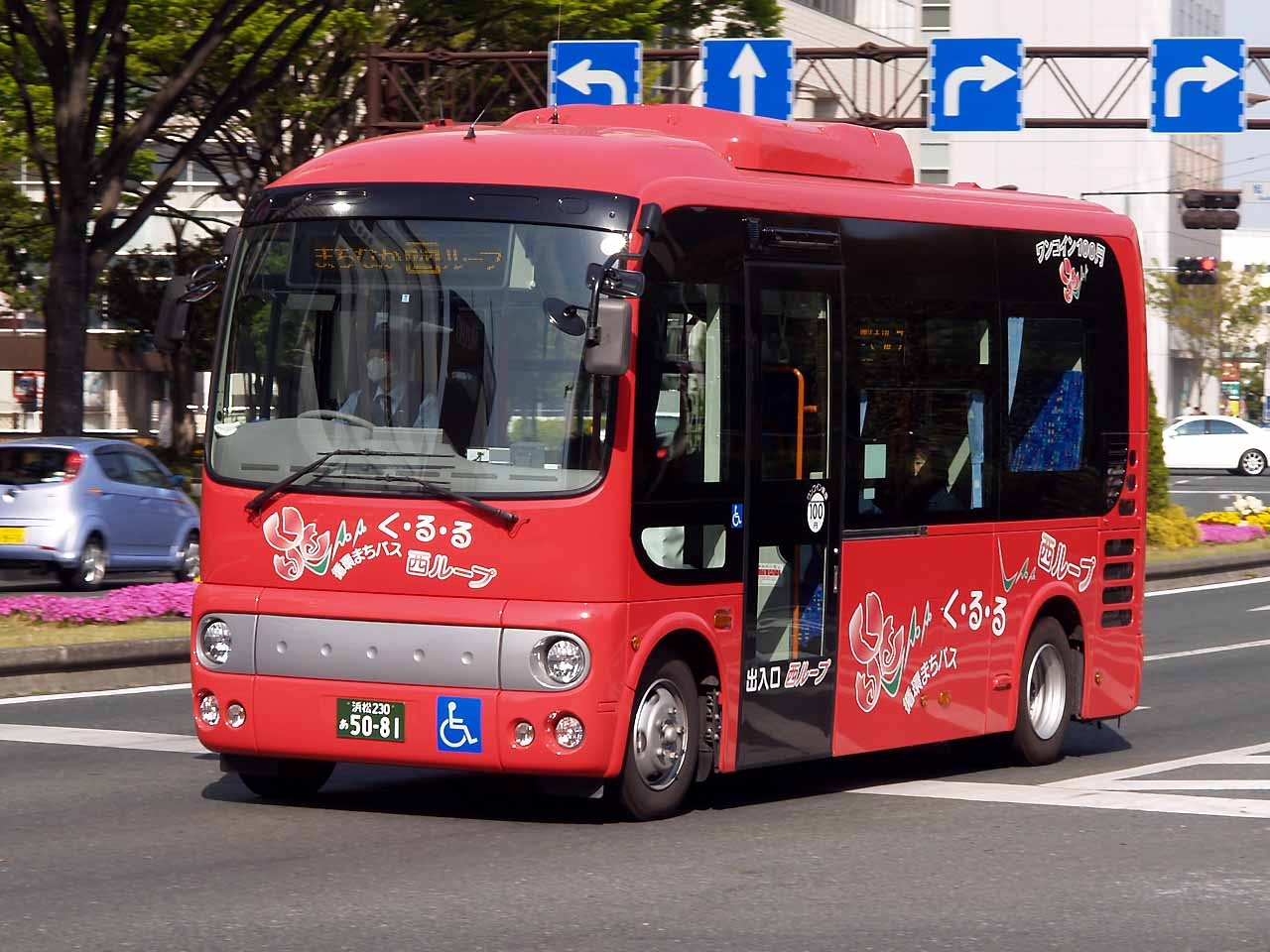
- Poncho HX6JHAE

Overview
- Manufacturer: J-Bus
- Production: 2002–present

Body and chassis
- Class: Complete bus
- Layout: Front-engine (1st generation); Rear-engine (2nd generation)
- Doors: Single or dual door
- Floor type: Low-floor
- Related: Hino Liesse

Powertrain
- Engine: 5.1 L J05E-TS common rail direct injection turbocharged and intercooled I4
- Power output: 180 PS (132.4 kW)
- Transmission: 5-speed manual 5-speed Aisin A500 automatic

Dimensions
- Wheelbase: 4.125 m (162.4 in); 4.825 m (190.0 in)
- Length: 6.29 m (247.6 in); 6.99 m (275.2 in)
- Width: 2.08 m (81.9 in)
- Height: 3.1 m (122.0 in)
- Curb weight: 5,620 kg (12,390.0 lb)

The Hino Poncho (日野・ポンチョ) is a low-floor minibus produced by Hino Motors through the J-Bus joint venture. They are used as on demand vehicles by many transport authorities, such as Translink.

== First generation (2002–2005) ==
The first-generation Poncho was based on the Fiat Ducato chassis.

- VF3ZCPMAC (2002)
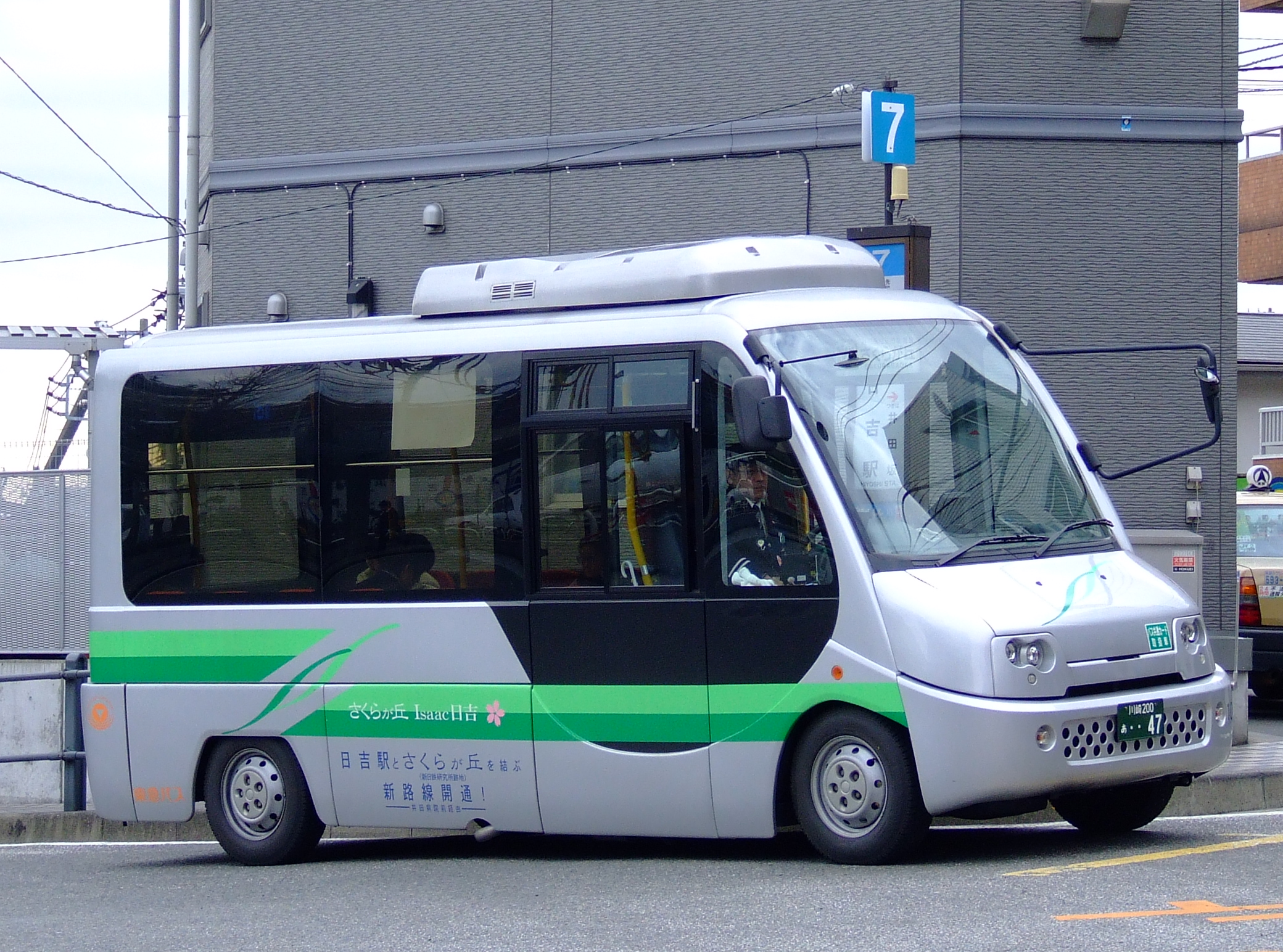
Poncho VF3ZCPMAC

== Second generation (2006–present) ==
The second-generation Poncho was developed from the Hino Liesse.

- ADG-HX6JHAE/LAE (2006)
- BDG-HX6JHAE/LAE (2007)
- SDG/SKG-HX9JHBE/LBE (2011)
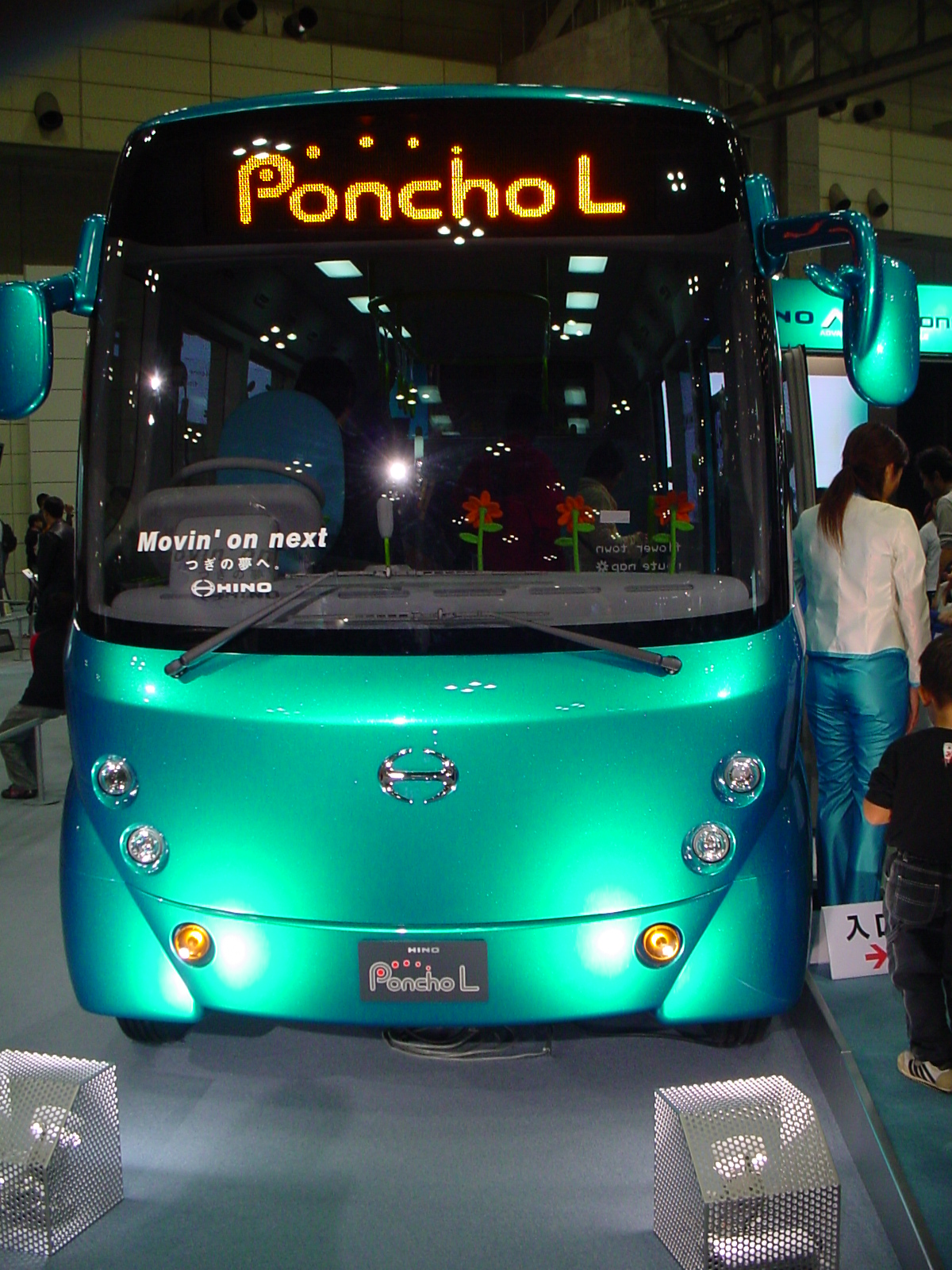
A Poncho L at the 2004 Tokyo Motor Show

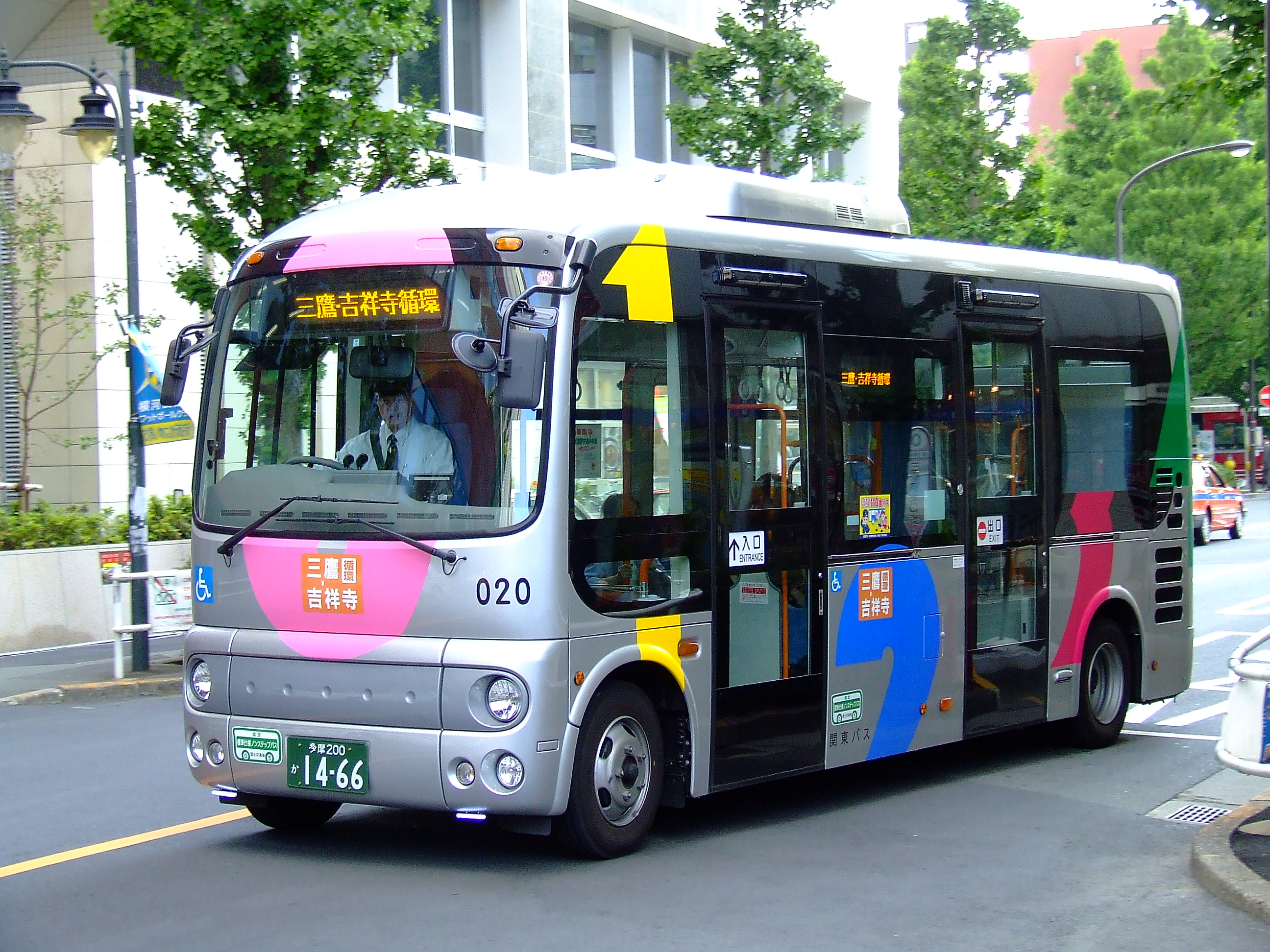
Poncho ADG-HX6JLAE

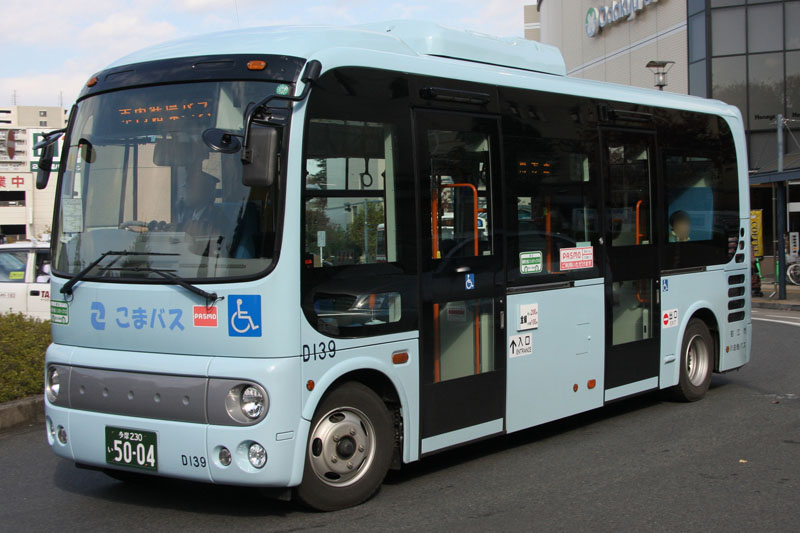
Poncho BDG-HX6JLAE

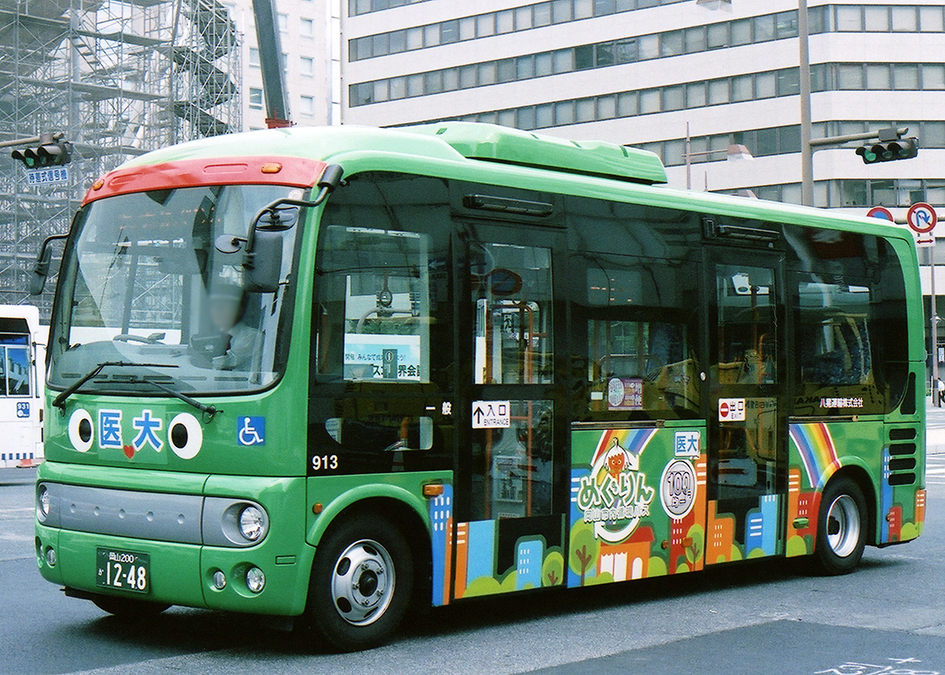
Poncho SKG-HX9JLBE

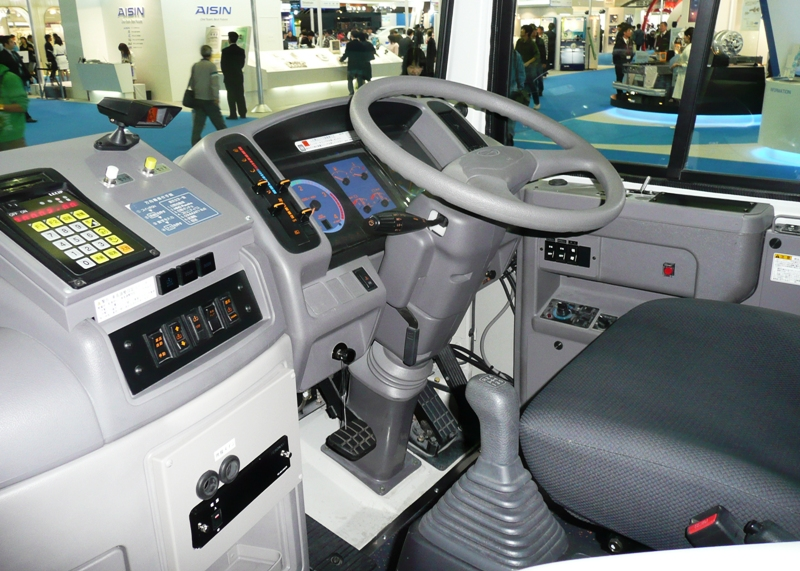
Poncho driver's compartment

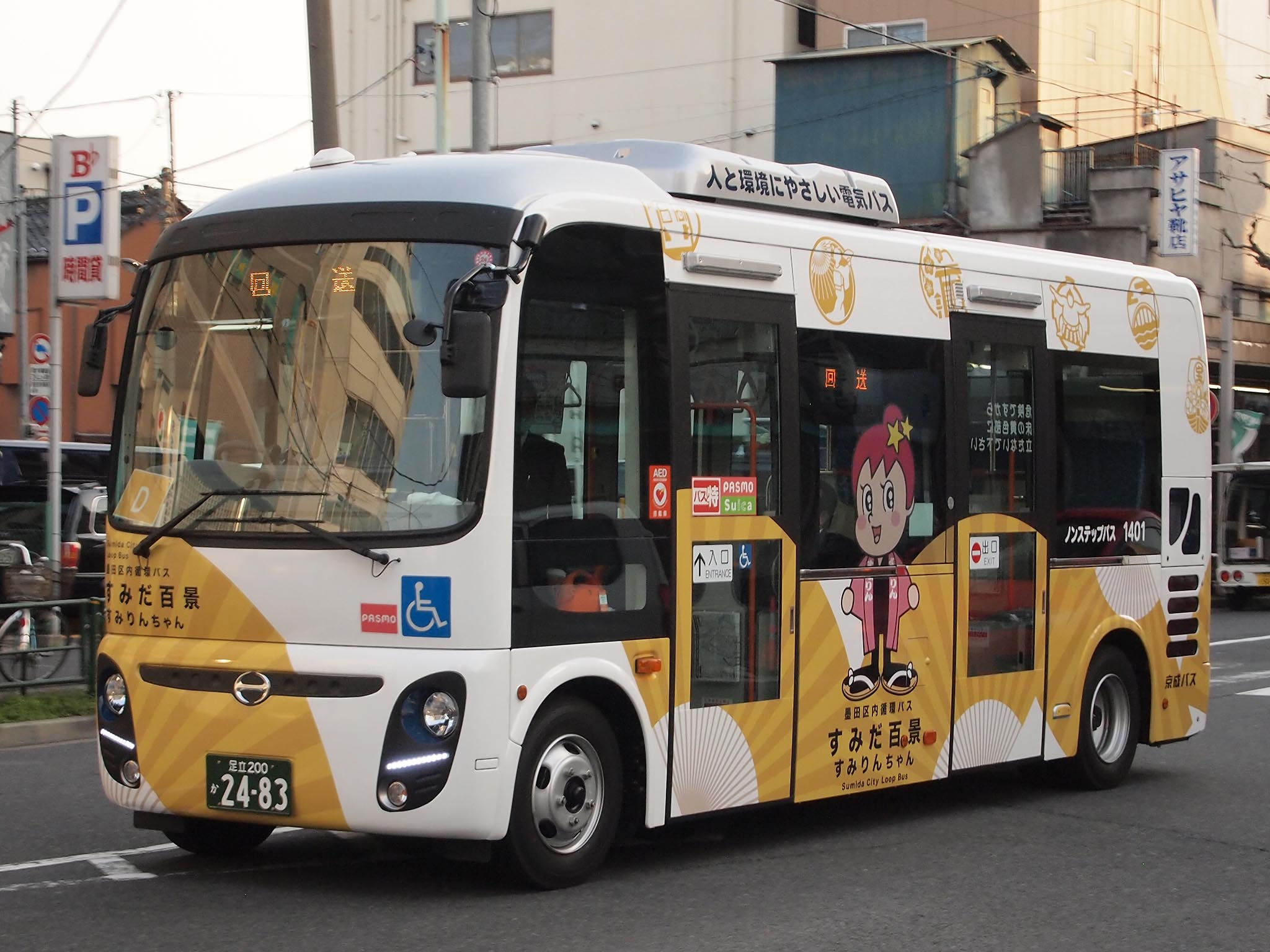
Poncho electric bus in Sumida, Tokyo
