= Rehabus =

Rehabus (Chinese: 復康巴士) is a paratransit service operated by the Hong Kong Society for Rehabilitation and began service in 1978.

The service provides public transit services to people with disabilities in Hong Kong who cannot ride regular public transit. While most modes of transport in Hong Kong are accessible (excluding minibuses), Rehabus provides an easier means of getting around Hong Kong.

The service operates 54 schedule routes, 3 feeder routes and a dial-a-bus service (includes pooling services).

Easy-Access Transport Services Limited is a service commissioned (2001) to provide hospital transport for the general public by the Hospital Authority. This system uses 20 hire cars to provide transport.

== Accessibility on regular services ==
- MTR - all stations and vehicles
  - Light Rail - all stations and 120 LRT vehicles are accessible
- Hong Kong Tramways - all 163 trams are not accessible due to car width and entrance steps
- Peak Tram - fully accessible stations and all 2 vehicles sets
- Franchised buses - 2,457 or 41% of fleet
- Ferries - most ferries (10 operators) and all terminals are accessible from lower deck
- Taxis - all 18,138 taxis are accessible
- Public light bus - all 4350 buses are not accessible to wheelchair users due to physical restrictions of vehicles

== Fleet ==
Rehabus operates a fleet of minibuses with a ramp (located at the rear of the bus) to load passengers for transport. An auto step entrance on the side allow more able body passengers to walk onto the bus.

- 16 Toyota Coaster BB43 (3 retired)
- 9 Toyota Coaster BB50 long-wheelbase
- 2 Volkswagen LT46
- 85 Toyota Coaster BZB50 LPG long-wheelbase
- 2 Toyota Coaster XZB59 super-long-wheelbase
- 1 Mitsubishi Fuso Rosa BE63DJ super-long-wheelbase

=== Retired ===
- 5 Toyota Coaster BB42
- 11 Mitsubishi Fuso Rosa BE434
- 18 Mitsubishi Fuso Rosa BE437
- 17 Mitsubishi Fuso Rosa BE437E
- 3 Mitsubishi Fuso Rosa BE439F
- 2 Mitsubishi Fuso MK218
- 1 Isuzu JALLT133
