= Nissan Diesel Space Runner JP =

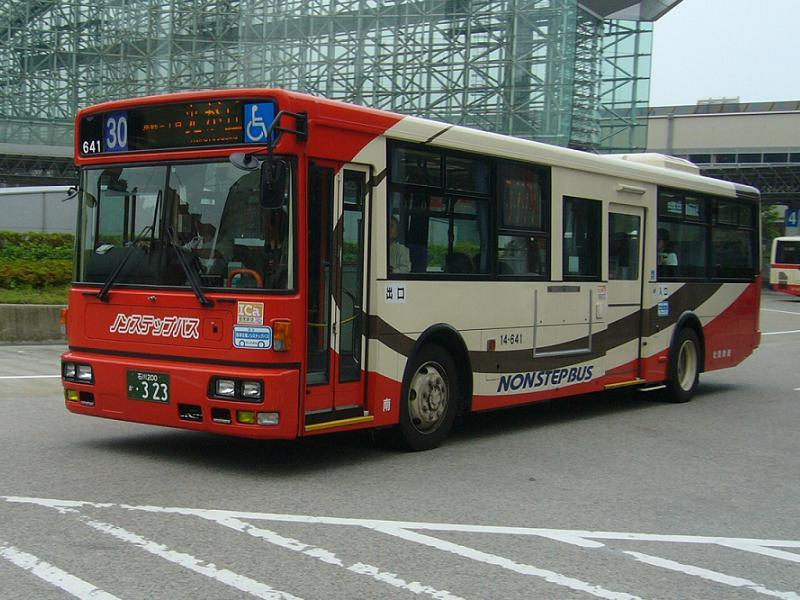

Overview
- Manufacturer: Nissan Diesel
- Production: 1994–2010

Body and chassis
- Class: Complete bus Bus chassis
- Body style: Single-decker bus
- Doors: 2
- Floor type: 1-Step entrance Low entry
- Related: Nissan Diesel Space Runner RM; Mitsubishi Fuso Aero Midi-S

Powertrain
- Engine: FE6, J07E, 6M60
- Transmission: UD (5-speed manual), ZF (automatic)

Dimensions
- Length: 10.2m or 10.5m
- Width: 2.3m
- Height: 3.0m or 3.2m

The Nissan Diesel Space Runner JP (kana:日産ディーゼル・スペースランナーJP) was a medium-duty single-decker bus produced by the Japanese manufacturer Nissan Diesel from 1994 until 2010. The range was primarily available as a public bus and it can be either constructed as a complete bus or a bus chassis.

== Models ==
- U-JP211 (1994)
- KC-JP250 (1995)
- KL-JP252 (1999)
- PK-JP360 (2004)
- PDG-JP820 (2007)
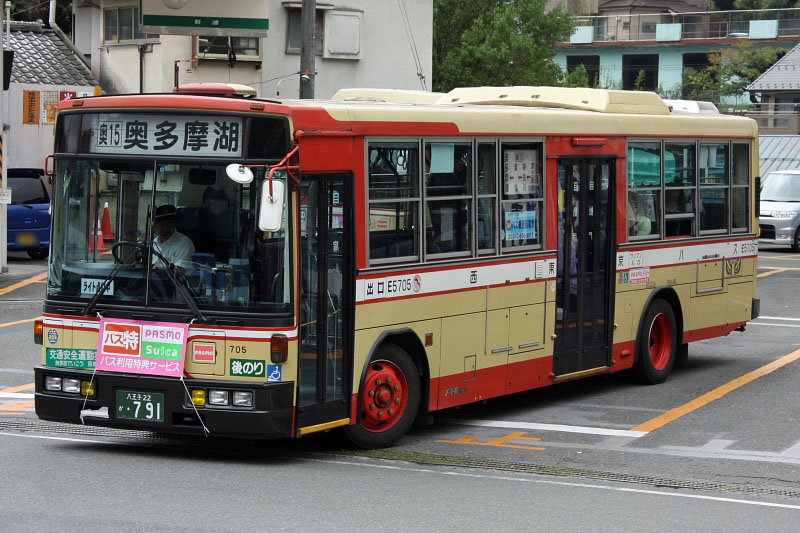
U-JP211NTN

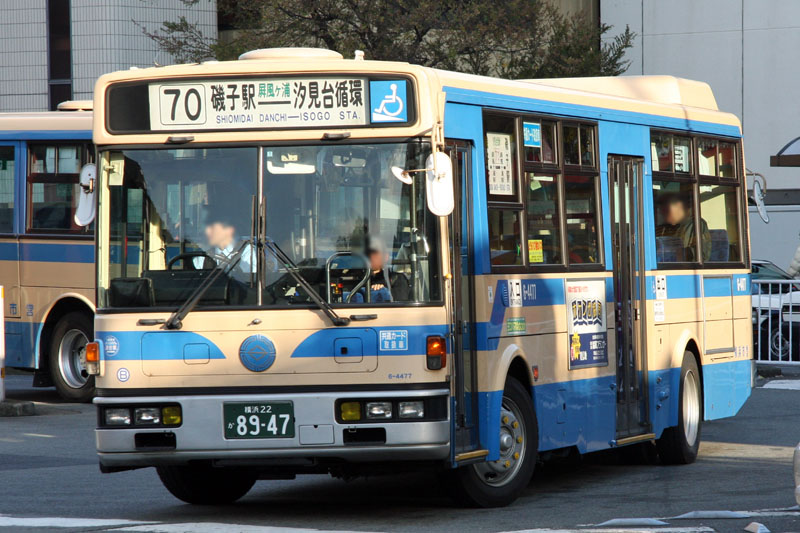
KC-JP250NTN

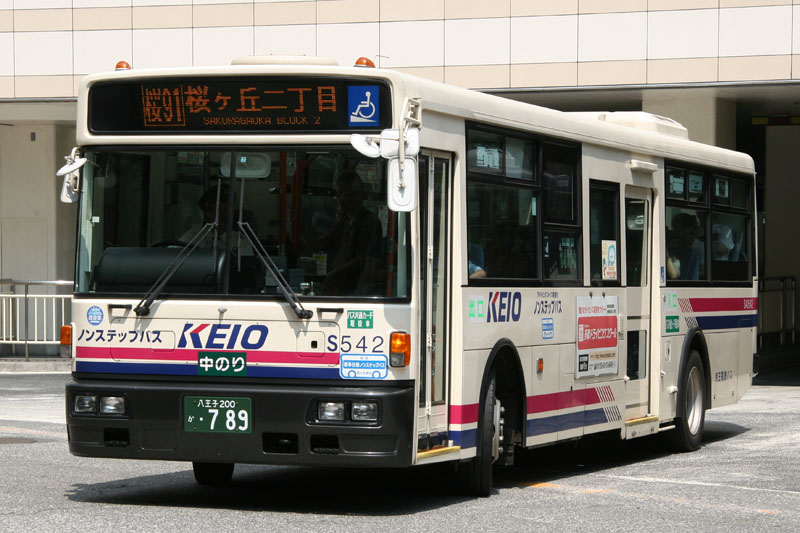
KL-JP252NAN
