= JJL =

JJL may refer to:

- Bedford JJL, a British bus model
- Jennifer Jason Leigh (born 1962), American actress
- Silvery salamander (Ambystoma platineum)
- JoJolion, 8th story arc of JoJo's Bizarre Adventure
