= SOR BN 10,5 =

Type of Czech midibus

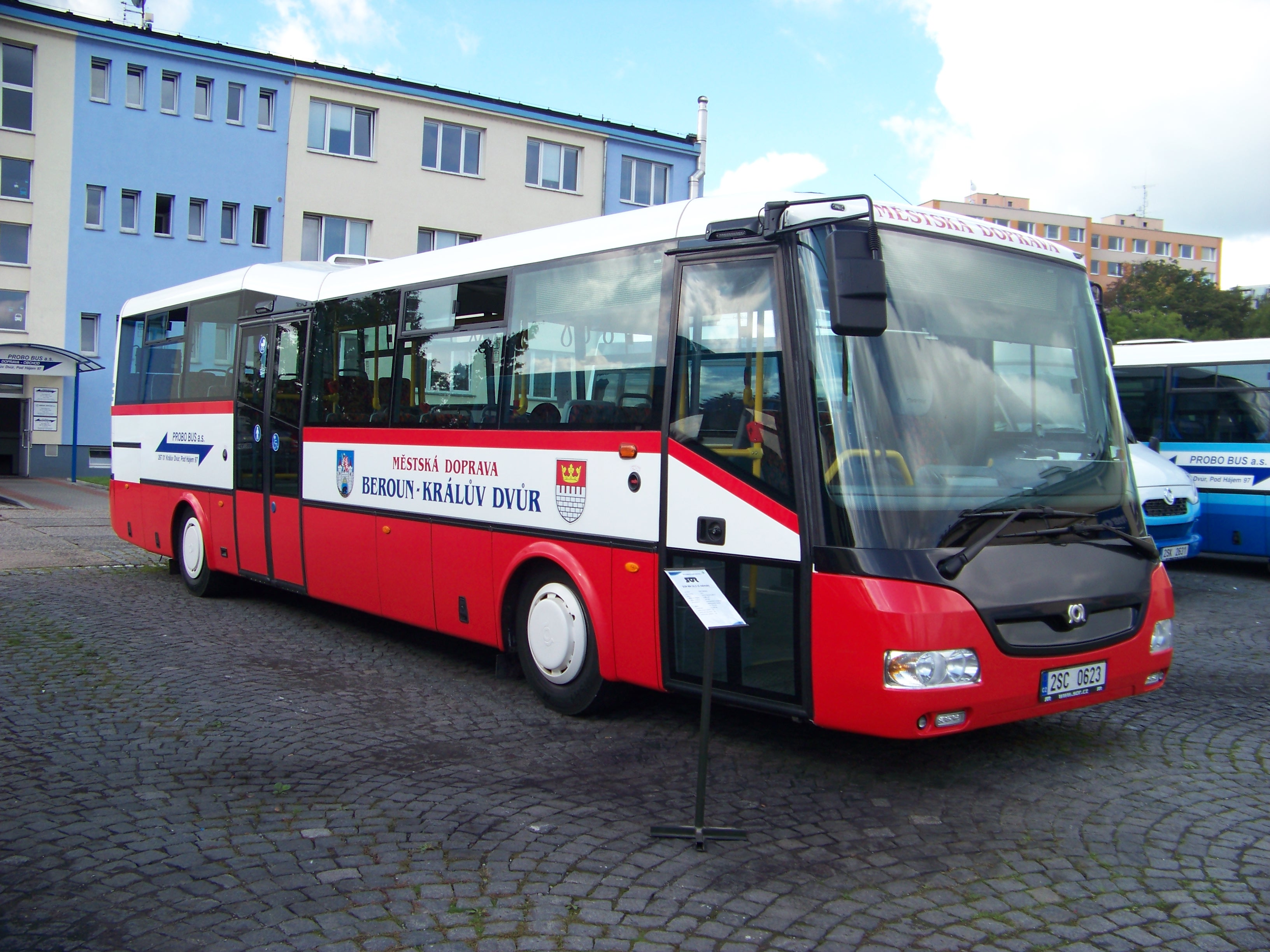
- SOR BN 10,5

Overview
- Manufacturer: SOR
- Assembly: Czech Republic

Body and chassis
- Doors: 2 or 3
- Floor type: Low-entry

Powertrain
- Engine: IVECO Tector NEF V6 Diesel engine
- Capacity: 29 seated 57 standing
- Power output: 185 kW (248 hp)
- Transmission: ZF 6-speed manual

Dimensions
- Length: 10,750 mm (423.2 in)
- Width: 2,525 mm (99.4 in)
- Height: 3,000 mm (118.1 in)
- Curb weight: 8,100 kg (17,900 lb)

SOR BN 10,5 is a low-entry midibus produced by Czech bus manufacturer SOR since 2005.

== Construction features ==
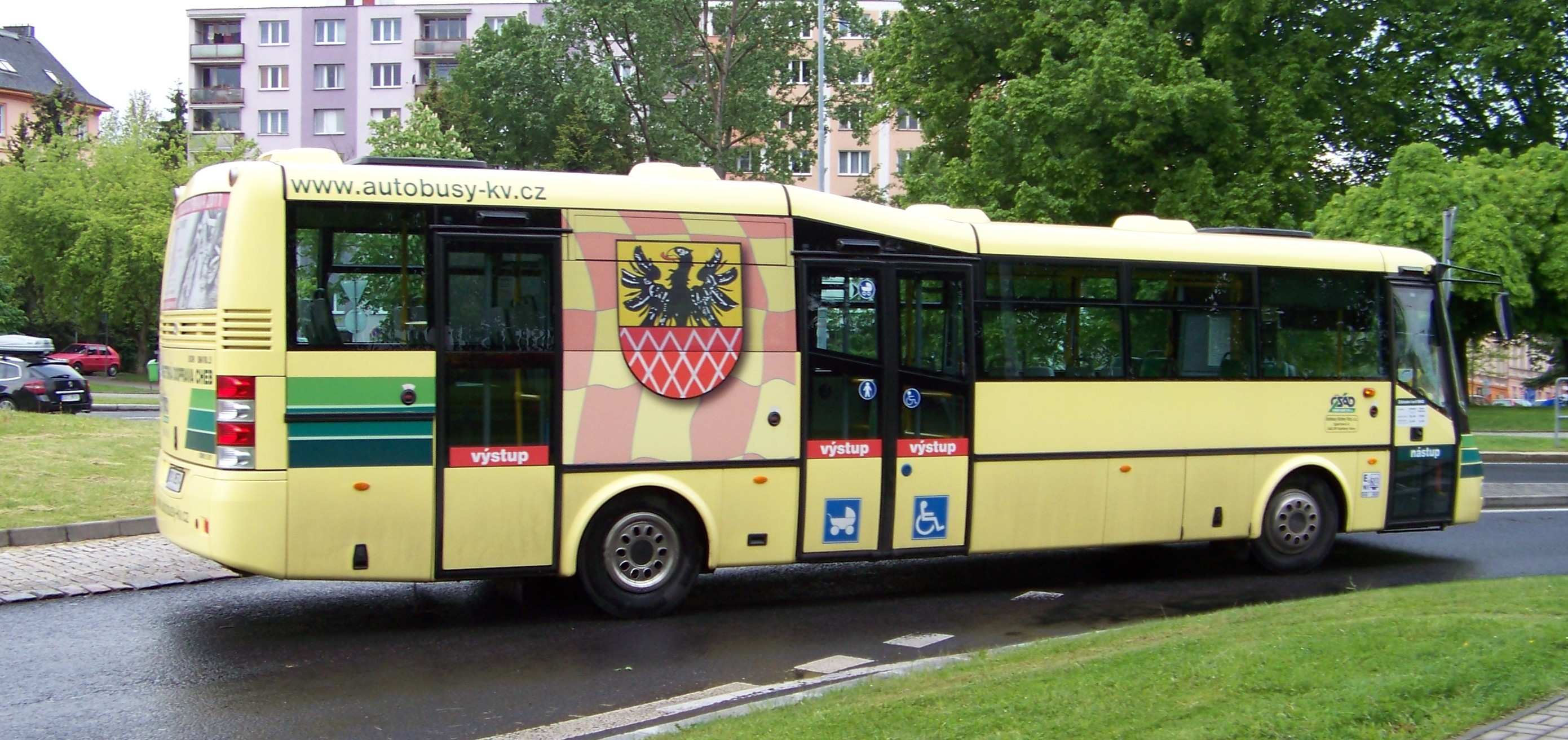
SOR BN 10,5 side view

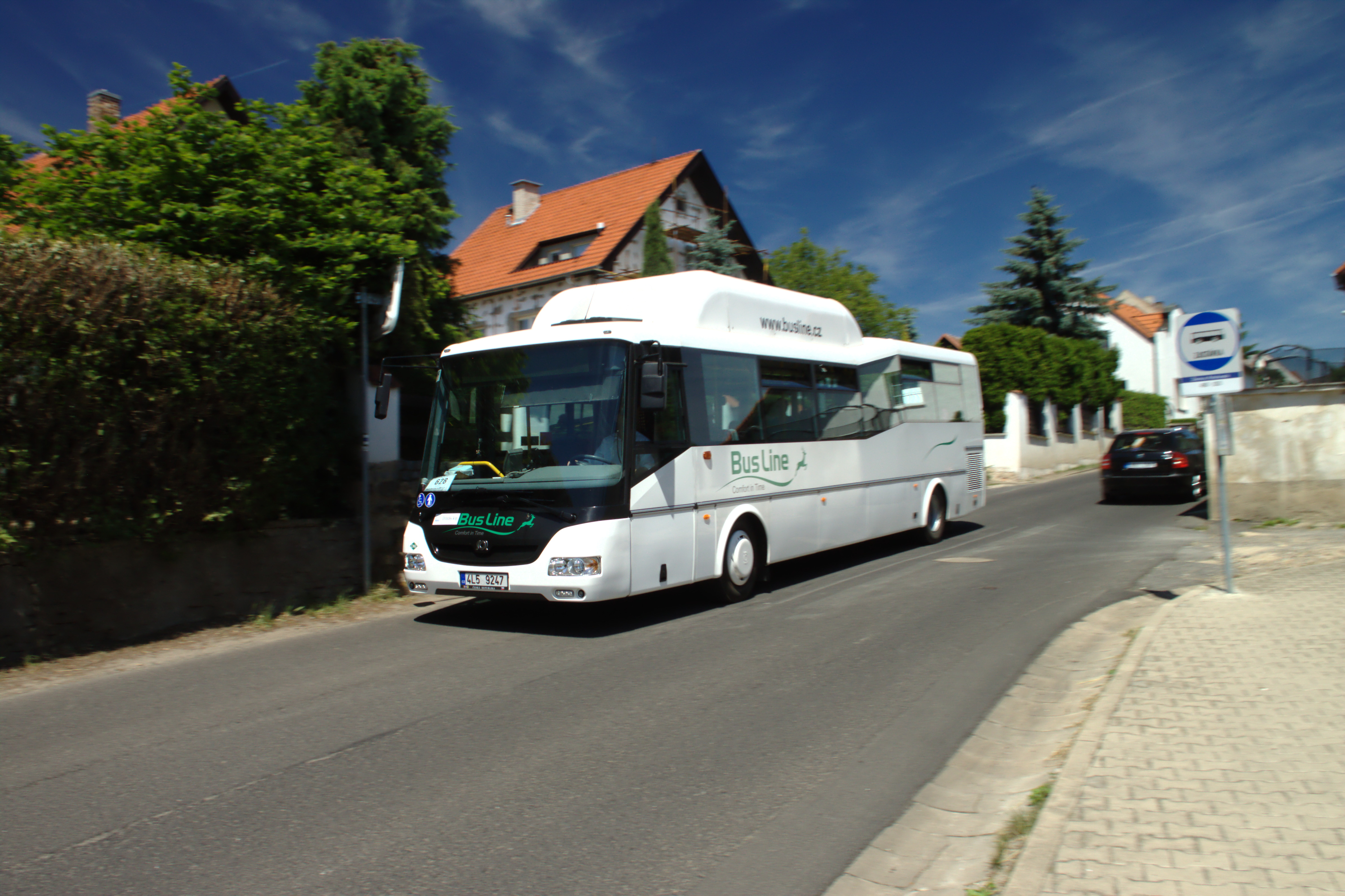
SOR BNG 10,5

Bus BN 10.5 is a two-axle low-entry midibus, which is designed primarily for urban and suburban traffic. On the right side plate of the bus are three sets of hinged doors. The space between the front and middle door is a low-floor (at a height of 360 mm above the ground). The rear part of the vehicle is located at a height of 800 mm above the ground. The drive axle is back (Spanish brand DANA) front axle wishbone design with independent wheel suspension and its own production. The engine and manual transmission is located in the rear of the bus. Semi-self-body, which is made of welded steel sections, is outside plating, interior is lined with plastic sheeting.

== Production and operation ==
SOR BN 10.5 replaced in the production its predecessor, step-entrance midibus SOR B 10,5. Buses BN 10.5, are used for less congested urban lines or commuter lines. One of the operators of these buses as the company ČSAD buses Plzeň . In the summer, 2008 SOR won a public tender The transport undertakings in Bratislava. Total to be delivered 60 buses type BN 10.5 with a total value of 270 million Slovak crowns by 2011.

== See also ==
- List of buses
