= Midibus =

Single-decker bus between 8 and 11 metres in length

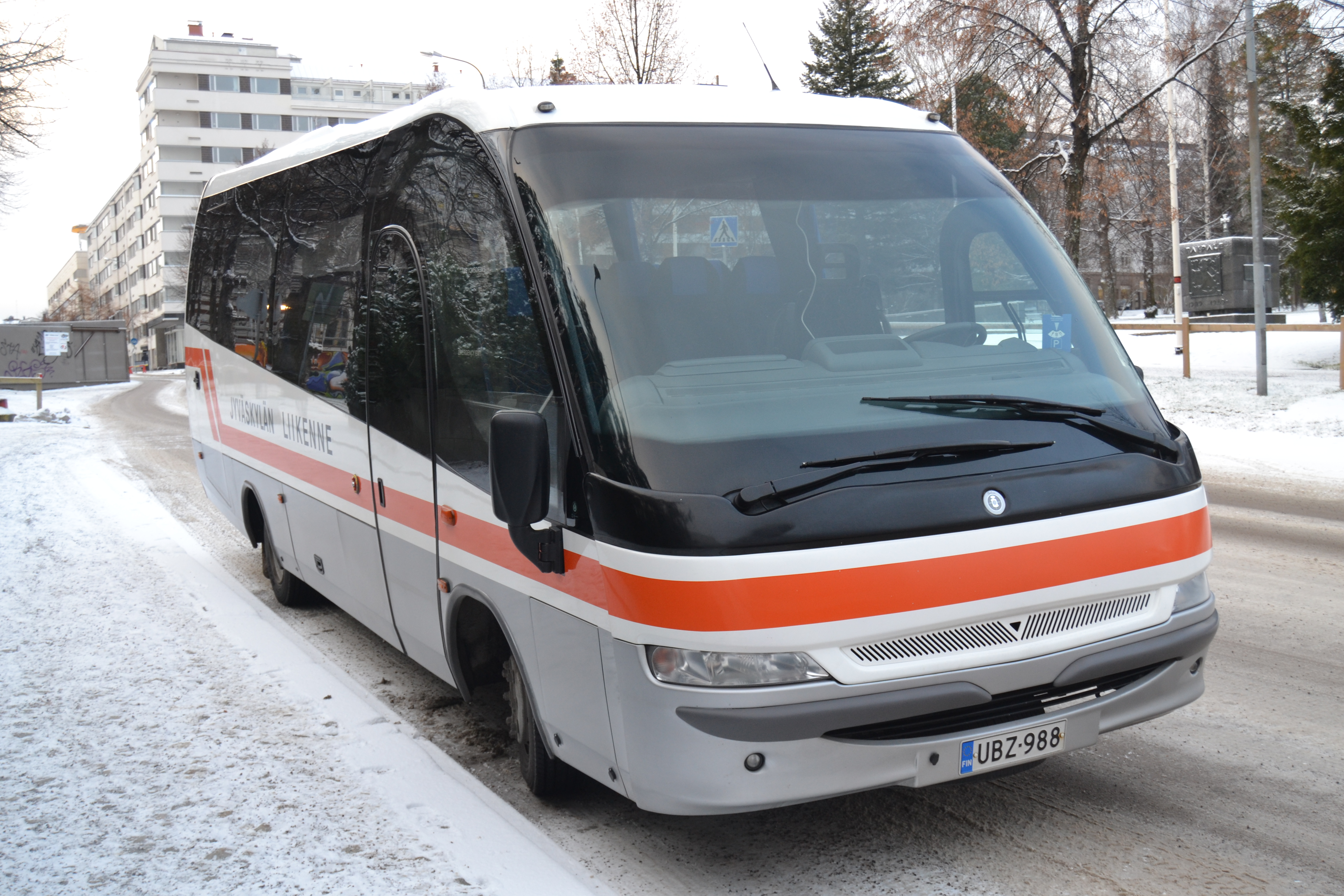
Iveco Indcar Mago 2 midibus in Jyväskylä, Finland

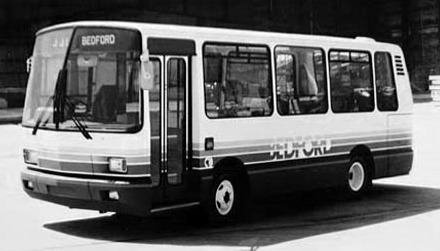
Early version of a midibus, the Bedford JJL

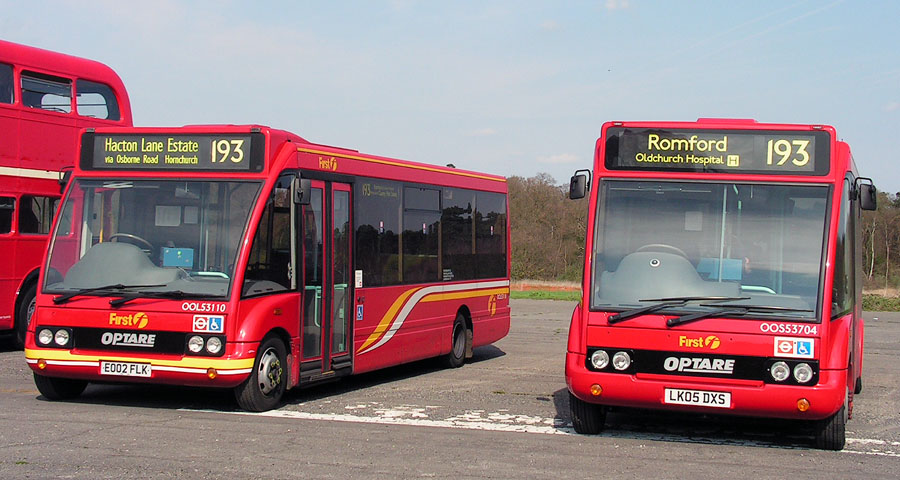
Two Optare Solo midibuses

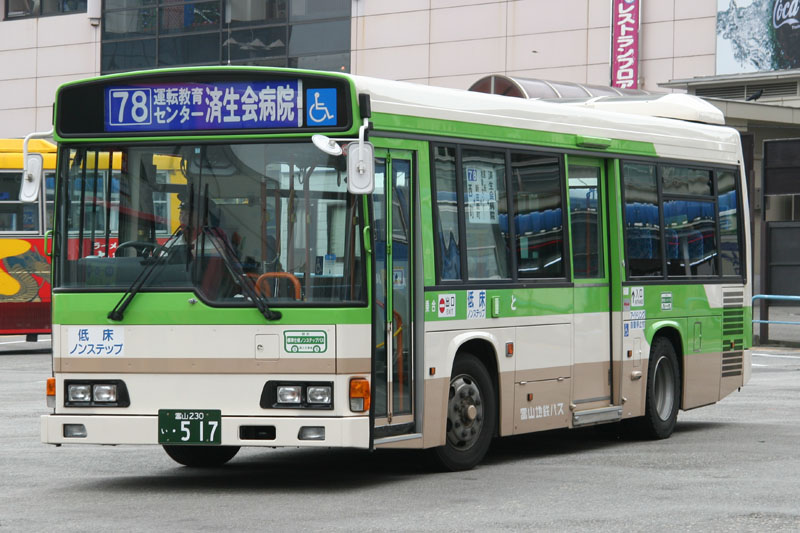
A Hino Rainbow midibus

A midibus is a classification of single-decker minibuses which are generally larger than a traditional minibus but smaller than a full-size single decker and can be anywhere between 8 metres (26 ft 3 in) and 11 metres (36 ft 1 in) long. While used in many parts of the world, the midibus is perhaps most common in the United Kingdom, where operators have found them more economical, and to have a sufficient number of seats compared to full size single-decker buses.

Midibuses are often designed to be lightweight to save on diesel fuel (e.g. smaller wheels than on larger buses), making them not as durable as heavier 'full size' buses. Some midibuses, such as the Scania OmniTown, are heavier and therefore more durable. In some places such as Hong Kong, some bus routes have to be served by midibuses due to the winding roads along such routes.

== United States designs ==
The term "midibus" is not in common use in the United States; such smaller and lighter-duty buses are not used for public transit there except in some very specialized instances. For example, Muni in San Francisco operates both 30-foot (9.1 m) and 40-foot (12 m) versions of the Orion VII transit bus to serve routes that include some of the steeper and curvier hills.

In charter / tour roles, there is indeed a gap between the minibus (12–28 seats) and the touring coach (47–50 seats). Several shuttle bus companies such as Goshen Coach and Crystal have manufactured rear-engined vehicles with 30–35 seats, but no generic term has ever been applied to them. They are usually lumped together with smaller "minibuses", and called "minibus" or "shuttle bus". The only other alternative was to import a "short" (two-axle) version of European touring coaches, known often as "baby coaches", around 35 feet (10.7 m) long and equipped with some 30–32 seats. These include the TEMSA TS 30/TS 35 and the MCI J3500.

In the 2000s, some manufacturers introduced mid-sized bus models based on large truck frames.

== Models ==
- Alexander Dennis Enviro100EV
- Alexander Dennis Enviro200 Dart – also manufactured and marketed in North America by New Flyer Industries as the New Flyer MiDi
- Alexander Dennis Enviro200 MMC
- Gillig Low Floor (29 and 35 ft variants)
- New Flyer Xcelsior (35 ft variants)
- ARBOC Specialty Vehicles
- BYD C6 (Gemilang Coachworks)
- BYD K7/K7M
- BYD B8
- Thomas Built Buses Saf-T-Liner HDX (25, 30, 35 ft variants)
- Agrale MT12 (chassis)
- Autosan Sancity 9 LE
- Autosan Sancity 10LF – (Low floor integral)
- Albion Nimbus – from 1955 to 1965
- Bedford VAS – From 1961 to 1987
- Bedford JJL – an early unsuccessful attempt at a purpose-built midibus 1975–81
- Bristol SU – 1960–6
- Chance Coach/Optima Opus
- Daewoo BS090 Royal-Midi
- Daewoo BC095
- Dennis Domino
- Dennis Dart (chassis)
- Dennis/Transbus/Alexander Dennis Dart SLF (chassis)
- ElDorado EZ Rider II MAX/BRT
- FAP A-402
- Foton C8L
- Grande West Vicinity
- Golden Dragon XML6606
- Golden Dragon XML6855JEVJ0C8
- Geely C10E
- Hino Melpha
- Hino Rainbow
- Heuliez GX117
- Heuliez GX127
- Hyundai Aero Town
- Hyundai Global 900
- Hyundai GreenCity
- Mercedes-Benz Trekka
- Ikarus 405
- Ikarus E91
- Ikarbus ik-107
- Irisbus Citelis 10
- Isuzu Erga Mio
- Isuzu Gala Mio
- Isuzu Journey-K
- Isuzu Novo
- Isuzu Turquoise
- Iveco EuroMidi
- Karsan Atak
- Kutsenits City
- Kravtex Credo EN9,5
- Leyland Swift
- MAN 10.xxx HOCL/MAN 11.xxx HOCL (chassis)
- MAN 12.xxx HOCL/MAN 12.xxx HOCL-NL (chassis)
- MAN 13.xxx HOCL (chassis)
- MAN 14.xxx HOCL/MAN 14.xxx HOCL-NL (chassis)
- MAN Lion's City M
- MAZ-206
- MAZ-256
- MCW Metrorider
- Marshall Minibus
- Mercedes-Benz O520 Cito
- Mercedes-Benz O530K (Citaro K)
- Mercedes-Benz OH1115LSB (chassis)
- Mitsubishi Fuso Aero Midi MJ/MK/Aero Midi-S
- New Flyer Industries D30LF / 35LF
- Neoplan Centroliner
- Nissan Diesel Space Runner JP
- Nissan Diesel Space Runner RM
- Nissan Diesel RB80 (chassis)
- Optare Excel
- Optare MetroRider
- Optare Solo
- Optare Solo SR
- Optare Versa
- Otokar Navigo/Sultan
- PAZ-3237
- PAZ-4230
- Scania OmniTown
- SOR CN 8.5
- Sksbus SA9-260L
- Sunwin iEV7
- Sunwin iEV8
- Temsa Prestij
- Thaco Town TB82S
- Thaco Town TB85S
- Thaco TB94CT
- Thaco Meadow 85S
- Thaco Meadow 89CT
- Van Hool NewA309
- VDL SB120
- VDL SB180
- Volkswagen Volksbus
- Volvo B6/B6LE (chassis)
- Volvo B6BLE (chassis)
- Wright StreetLite
- Ashok Leyland Jan Bus Midi

== See also ==
- Minibus
- List of buses
