= Paratransit =

Transportation service for people with disabilities

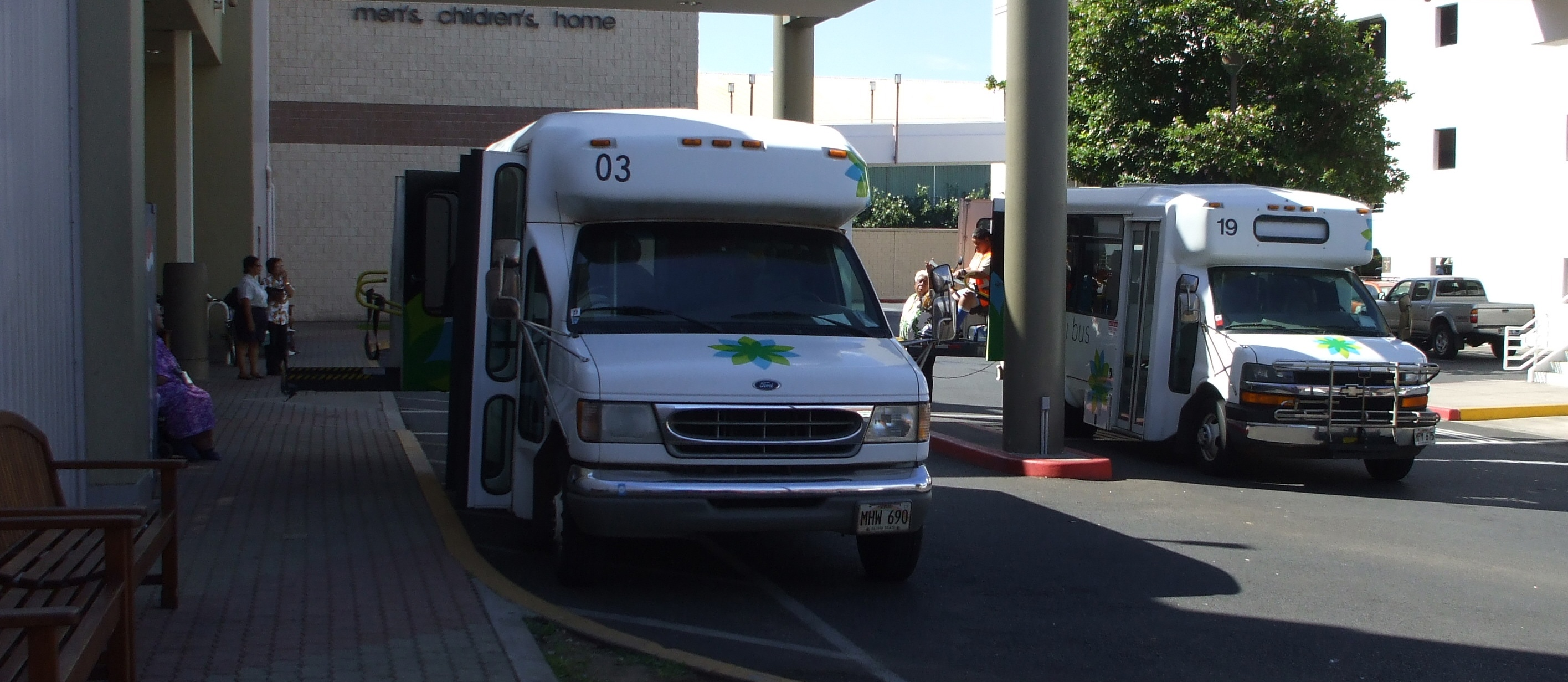
Two Maui Bus buses engaged in paratransit services. One is picking up a person who uses a wheelchair, while another is discharging another person using a mobility scooter.

Paratransit (also community transport in the United Kingdom, or intermediate public transport) is a type of public transport service that supplements fixed-route mass transit by providing individualized rides without fixed routes or timetables. Paratransit services may vary considerably on the degree of flexibility they provide their customers. At their simplest they may consist of a taxi or small bus that will run along a more or less defined route and then stop to pick up or discharge passengers on request. At the other end of the spectrum—fully demand-responsive transport—the most flexible paratransit systems offer on-demand call-up door-to-door service from any origin to any destination in a service area. In addition to public transit agencies, paratransit services may be operated by community groups or not-for-profit organizations, and for-profit private companies or operators.

The concept of intermediate public transport (IPT) or paratransit, exhibits considerable variation between developed and developing nations. In developed countries, it is typically a flexible, demand-responsive form of public transportation designed to provide point-to-point service. These systems are generally well-structured and organized. On the other hand, in developing countries, IPT often operates as an informal, cost-effective alternative to formal transportation modes. It tends to be unorganized and subject to minimal government regulation, serving as a prevalent form of spontaneous public transport that facilitates quick and convenient travel.

The importance of IPT may extends beyond mobility, as it can also contribute to the economic well-being of those who operate these services. In some cases, drivers of vehicles such as tempos and autorickshaws can earn a substantial daily income, which supports their livelihoods.

Typically, minibuses are used to provide paratransit service in USA. Most paratransit vehicles are equipped with wheelchair lifts or ramps to facilitate access.

In the United States, private transportation companies often provide paratransit service in cities and metropolitan areas under contract to local public transportation agencies.

== Terminology ==
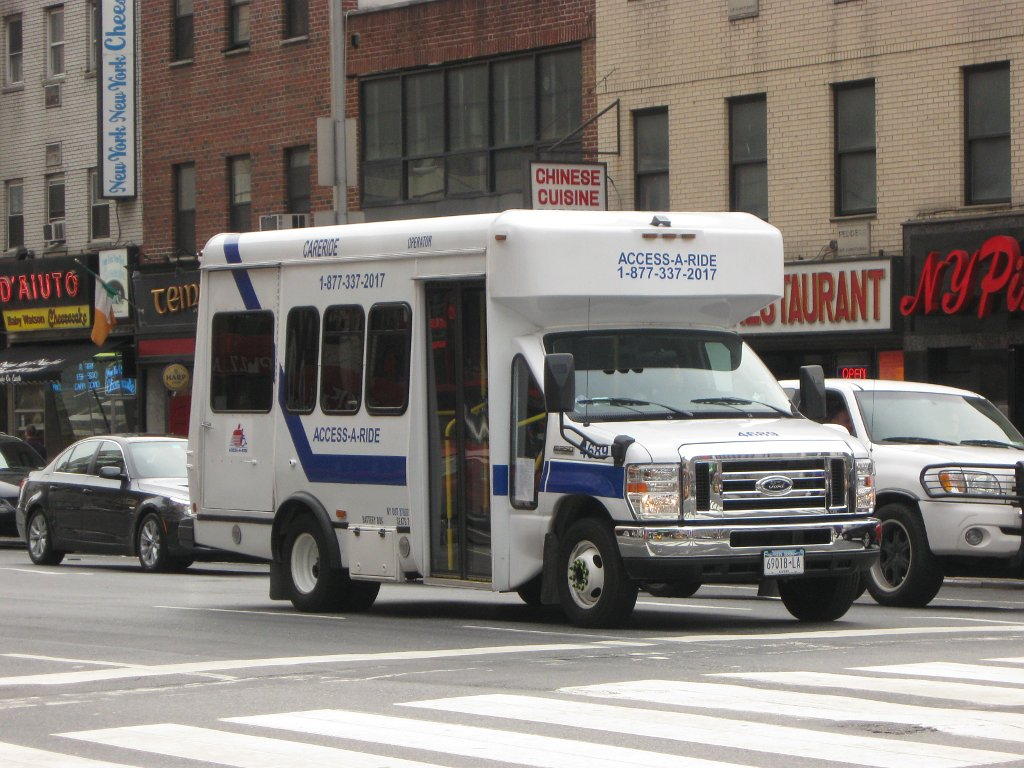
A NYC Transit paratransit bus

The use of "paratransit" ("para transit", "para-transit") has evolved and taken on two somewhat separate broad sets of meaning and application in North America; the term is rarely used in the rest of the world.

The more general meaning includes any transit service operating alongside conventional fixed-route services, including airport limousines and carpools. Since the early 1980s, particularly in North America, the term began to be used increasingly to describe the second meaning: special transport services for people with disabilities. In this respect, paratransit has become a subsector and business in its own right. The term paratransit is rarely used outside of North America.

Projects in the broader sense were documented by the Urban Institute in the 1974 book Para-transit: Neglected options for urban mobility, followed a year later by the first international overview, Paratransit: Survey of International Experience and Prospects. Robert Cervero's 1997 book, Paratransit in America: Redefining Mass Transportation, embraced this wider definition of paratransit, arguing that America's mass transit sector should enlarge to include micro-vehicles, minibuses, and shared-taxi services found in many developing cities. Paratransit, as an alternative mode of flexible passenger transportation that does not follow fixed routes or schedules, are common and often offer the only mechanized mobility options for the poor in many parts of the developing world.

== Diversion to taxis and ride-hailing services ==
Some paratransit systems have begun subsidizing private taxi or ride-hailing trips as an alternative to the government-run or government-contracted system. For example, in 2010, Solano County, California dissolved Solano Paratransit and allowed paratransit-eligible passengers to buy $100 worth of taxi scrip for $15. This eliminated the need for passengers to book a week in advance, and reduced the cost to the county from $81 to about $30.

In 2016, the Massachusetts Bay Transportation Authority began a pilot program which has subsidized paratransit passengers on Uber, Lyft, and Curb, up to a cap of $42 per ride. This retained the ability to book by phone, lowered the fare for riders, eliminated the need to book the trip a day in advance, eliminated shared trips, reduced in-transit time, and reduced the pickup wait time from 30 minutes to as low as 5 minutes in the urban core. With the subsidy cap initially set at $13, the MBTA reduced the average cost of a paratransit trip from $35 to $9. Pilot participants on average substantially increased the number of trips they took, but still at a lower overall cost to the agency. Availability of wheelchair-accessible vehicles remained an occasional problem, but these were only needed by about 20% of paratransit riders.

== In the United States ==
=== Rehabilitation Act of 1973 ===
Before passage of the Americans with Disabilities Act of 1990 (ADA), paratransit was provided by not-for-profit human service agencies and public transit agencies in response to the requirements in Section 504 of the Rehabilitation Act of 1973. Section 504 prohibited the exclusion of disabled people from "any program or activity receiving federal financial assistance". In Title 49 Part 37 (49 CFR 37) of the Code of Federal Regulations, the Federal Transit Administration defined requirements for making buses accessible or providing complementary paratransit services within public transit service areas.

Most transit agencies did not see fixed route accessibility as desirable and opted for a flexible system of small paratransit vehicles operating parallel to a system of larger, fixed-route buses. The expectation was that the paratransit services would not be heavily used, making a flexible system of small vehicles a less expensive alternative for accessibility than options with larger, fixed-route vehicles. This however ended up not being the case. Often paratransit services were being filled up to their capacity. In some cases, this left individuals who were in need of the door to door service provided by paratransit unable to utilize it due to the fact that disabled people who could use fixed-route vehicles also found themselves using these paratransit services.

=== Americans with Disabilities Act of 1990 ===
With the passage of the ADA, Section 504 of the Rehabilitation Act was extended to include all activities of state and local government. Its provisions were not limited to programs receiving federal funds and applied to all public transit services, regardless of how the services were funded or managed. Title II of the ADA also more clearly defined a disabled person's right to equal participation in transit programs, and the provider's responsibility to make that participation possible.

In revisions to Title 49 Part 37, the Federal Transit Administration defined the combined requirements of the ADA and the Rehabilitation Act for transit providers. These requirements included "complementary" paratransit to destinations within 3/4 mile of all fixed routes (49 CFR 37.131) and submission of a plan for complying with complementary paratransit service regulations (49 CFR 37.135). Paratransit service is an unfunded mandate.

Under the ADA, complementary paratransit service is required for passengers who are 1) Unable to navigate the public bus system, 2) unable to get to a point from which they could access the public bus system, or 3) have a temporary need for these services because of injury or some type of limited duration cause of disability (49 CFR 37.123). Title 49 Part 37 details the eligibility rules along with requirements governing how the service must be provided and managed. In the United States, paratransit service is now highly regulated and closely monitored for compliance with standards set by the Federal Transit Administration (FTA).

As the ADA came into effect in 1992 (49 CFR 37.135), the FTA required transit systems in the United States to plan and begin implementing ADA compliant services, with full implementation by 1997 (49 CFR 37.139). During this period, paratransit demand and services rapidly expanded. This growth led to many new approaches to manage and provide these services. Computerized reservation, scheduling and dispatching for paratransit have also evolved substantially and are now arguably among the most sophisticated management systems available in the world of rubber tire transit (land-based non-rail public transit).

Since the passage of the ADA, paratransit service has grown rapidly as a mode of public transit in the United States. Continued growth can be expected due to the aging of baby boomers and disabled Iraq War veterans. The growth of the number of people requiring paratransit has resulted in an increase in cost for the paratransit industry to maintain these services. The results of this rising cost are the paratransit industry trying to get individuals to move from a reliance on paratransit vehicles to fixed-route vehicles. Due to the push to have paratransit vehicles being the main method of transportation for disabled individuals before the passing of ADA, the paratransit industry is finding it hard to get individuals to switch over to fixed route transportation.

=== Statistics ===
Beginning in 2004, the bus, rail and motor coach trade magazine Metro Magazine began conducting annual surveys of public and private paratransit providers:

Year	Highlighted topic(s)
2004	Budget and cost-related items
2005	Meeting service demands with limited resources
2006	Recruitment and retention of drivers
2007	
2008	Technology
2009	
2010	Technology
2011	Technology and new types of vehicles
2012	Customer service
2013	Funding, demand, retention

The US Government Accountability Office GAO released a report in November 2012 for the Federal Transit Administration which "examined: (1) the extent of compliance with ADA paratransit requirements, (2) changes in ADA paratransit demand and costs since 2007, and (3) actions transit agencies are taking to help address changes in the demand for and costs of ADA paratransit service." The report found that "average number of annual ADA paratransit trips provided by a transit agency increased 7 percent from 2007 to 2010" and that the average cost of providing a paratransit trip is "an estimated three and a half times more expensive than the average cost of $8.15 to provide a fixed-route trip." .

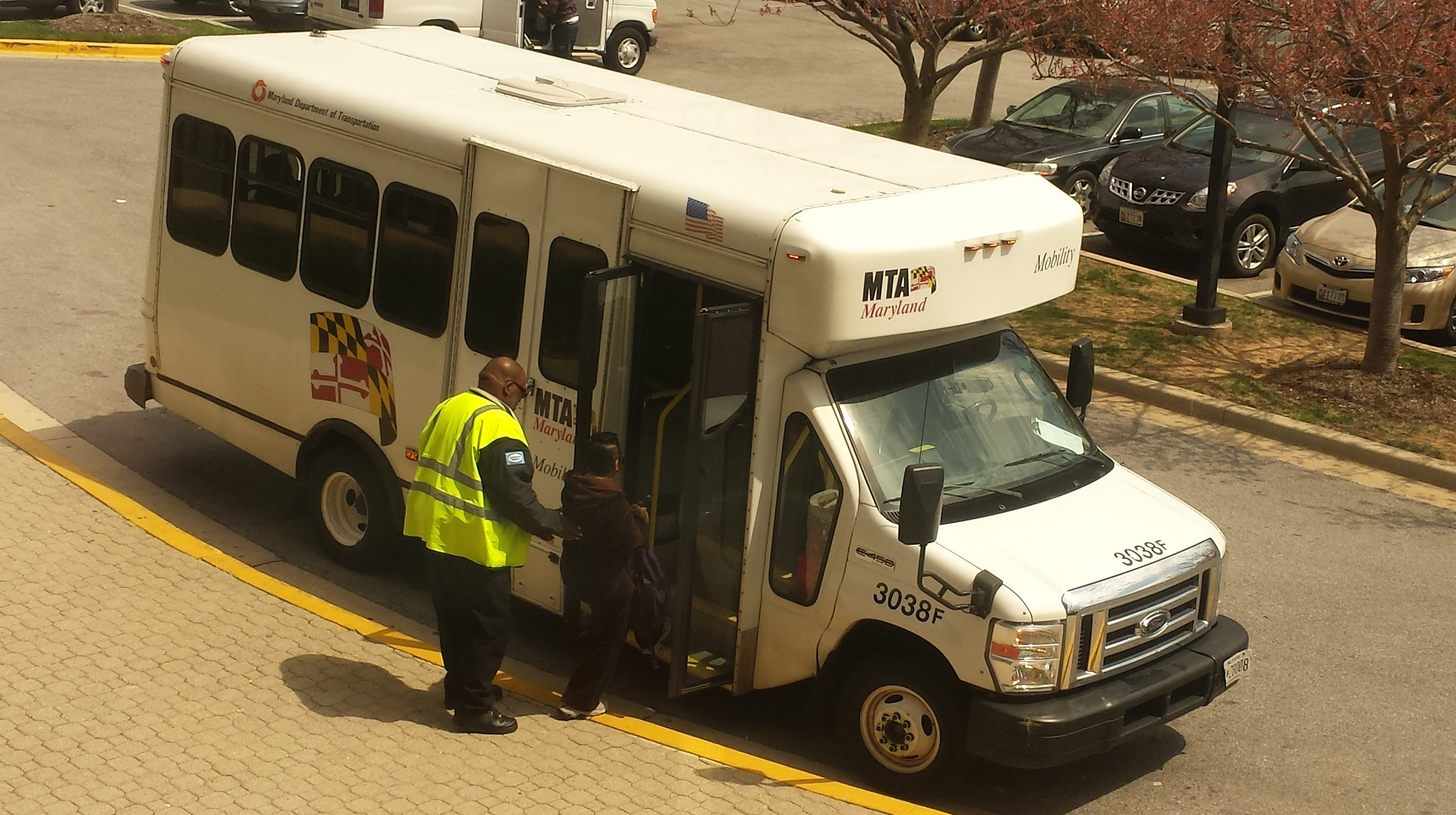
MTA Mobility vehicle operator assisting a customer in boarding a paratransit vehicle

The Maryland Transit Administration reported paratransit ridership increases of 15% in fiscal 2012, with double-digit increases expected in fiscal 2013 and 2014. The cost of providing paratransit service is considerably higher than traditional fixed-route bus service, with Maryland's Mobility service reporting per-passenger costs of over $40 per trip in 2010. Paratransit ridership growth of more than 10% per year was reported in the District of Columbia metropolitan area for 2006 through 2009. Washington Metropolitan Area Transit Authority's MetroAccess service in Washington, D.C. conducted a peer review of large urban paratransit systems in the US in 2009:

	2008 ridership	2008 budget	2008 cost/passenger
NYCTA	4.4M	$284M	$64
LACMTA	1.9M	$83M	$44
WMATA	1.7M	$67M	$38
MBTA	1.5M	$50M	$33
King County Metro	1.1M	$42M	$38

In response to increasing ridership and costs of providing paratransit service, WMATA made two significant changes beginning in 2010: the paratransit service area was reduced from jurisdictional boundaries to the ADA requirement of within a 3/4 mile corridor of fixed-route services; and, fares were linked to WMATA's fixed route services and charged to the ADA allowable maximum of two times the fastest equivalent bus or rail fare. These changes helped result in the first-ever reduction in the number of year-over-year trips between 2011 and 2012.

Annually, the Canadian Urban Transit Association publishes a fact book providing statistics for all of the Ontario specialized public transit services; as of 2015 there were 79 in operation.

=== Technology ===
The complicated nature of providing paratransit service in accordance with ADA guidelines led to the development of sophisticated software for the industry.

Intelligent transportation systems technologies are common in North America and Europe. Interactive voice response systems and web-based initiatives are anticipated for paratransit services.

Advanced analytics is another field being applied to paratransit operations. Some companies are beginning to integrate cloud computing models to find operational efficiencies and cost savings for smaller paratransit service providers.

== Canada ==
There is no legislation providing details on paratransit standards, but the Canadian Urban Transit Association has provided voluntary guidelines for member transit agencies to use to determine paratransit needs and standards. Various operators including the TTC, BC Transit, OC Transpo and TransLink offer the service, and in the province of British Columbia paratransit is referred to as HandyDART throughout by both major transit operators.

== Developing countries ==
Paratransit systems in many developing world cities are operated by individuals and small business. The fragmented, intensely competitive nature of the industry makes government regulation and control much harder than traditional public transport. Government authorities have cited problems with unsafe vehicles and drivers as justifying efforts to regulate and "formalize" paratransit operations. However, these efforts have been limited by ignorance on the part of regulatory authorities and mistrust between authorities and operators.

=== Sub-Saharan Africa ===
In sub-Saharan Africa, this form of transport (called "transport artisanal" in French) serves more than 70% of commuters, evolved organically and replaced formal transit after independence. Paratransit can take many forms, from the 16-seater minibus taxis (see share taxi), to motorbikes (boda boda).

== Other areas ==
In the United Kingdom, services are called community transport and provided locally. The Community Transport Association is a central organization recognized by the government which "promotes excellence through training, publications, advice, events and project support on voluntary, community and accessible transport."

In Zagreb, Croatia, the municipal mass transit operator ZET operates a fleet of minibuses equipped with several seats and lift for wheelchairs for on-demand transport of disabled persons.

In Hong Kong, Rehabus service is provided by the Hong Kong Society for Rehabilitation.

The New Zealand Transport Agency provides a comprehensive list of options in the country, including Total Mobility (TM) in Auckland.

In Australia, Disability Standards for Accessible Public Transport under subsection 31 (1) of the Disability Discrimination Act of 1992 mandated that as of 2002 "all new public transport conveyances, premises and infrastructure must comply with the transport standards. Facilities already in operation at that time have between five and thirty years to comply with the standards."

In some parts of the world, transportation services for the elderly and disabled are obtainable through share taxi options, often without formal government involvement.

== Specific services ==
- See Demand-responsive transport for examples

== See also ==
- Day trip
- New Mobility – Disability magazine
- Shared transport
- Taxicab
