= Sunwin =

Chinese bus manufacturer

Shanghai Sunwin Bus Corporation

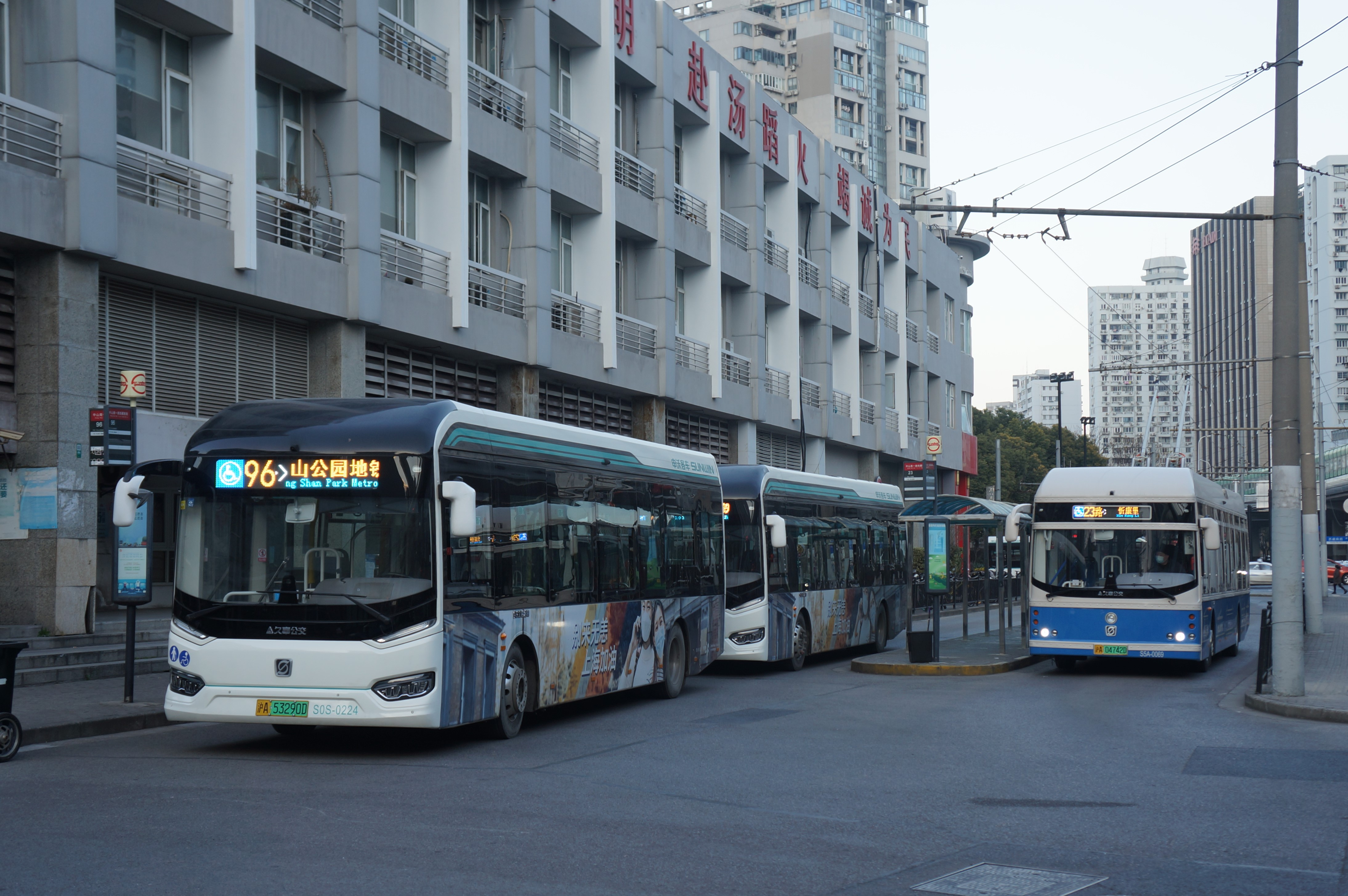
- Sunwin electric bus and trolleybus
- Type: Government owned corporation
- Industry: Bus manufacturing
- Founded: 2001; 25 years ago
- Headquarters: Shanghai, China
- Owner: SAIC Motor
- Website: sunwinbus.com

Sunwin is a vehicle division of the Chinese company SAIC Motor which provides buses and trolleybuses for bus routes in Shanghai. However, Sunwin buses were also built in other cities outside of Shanghai.

== History ==
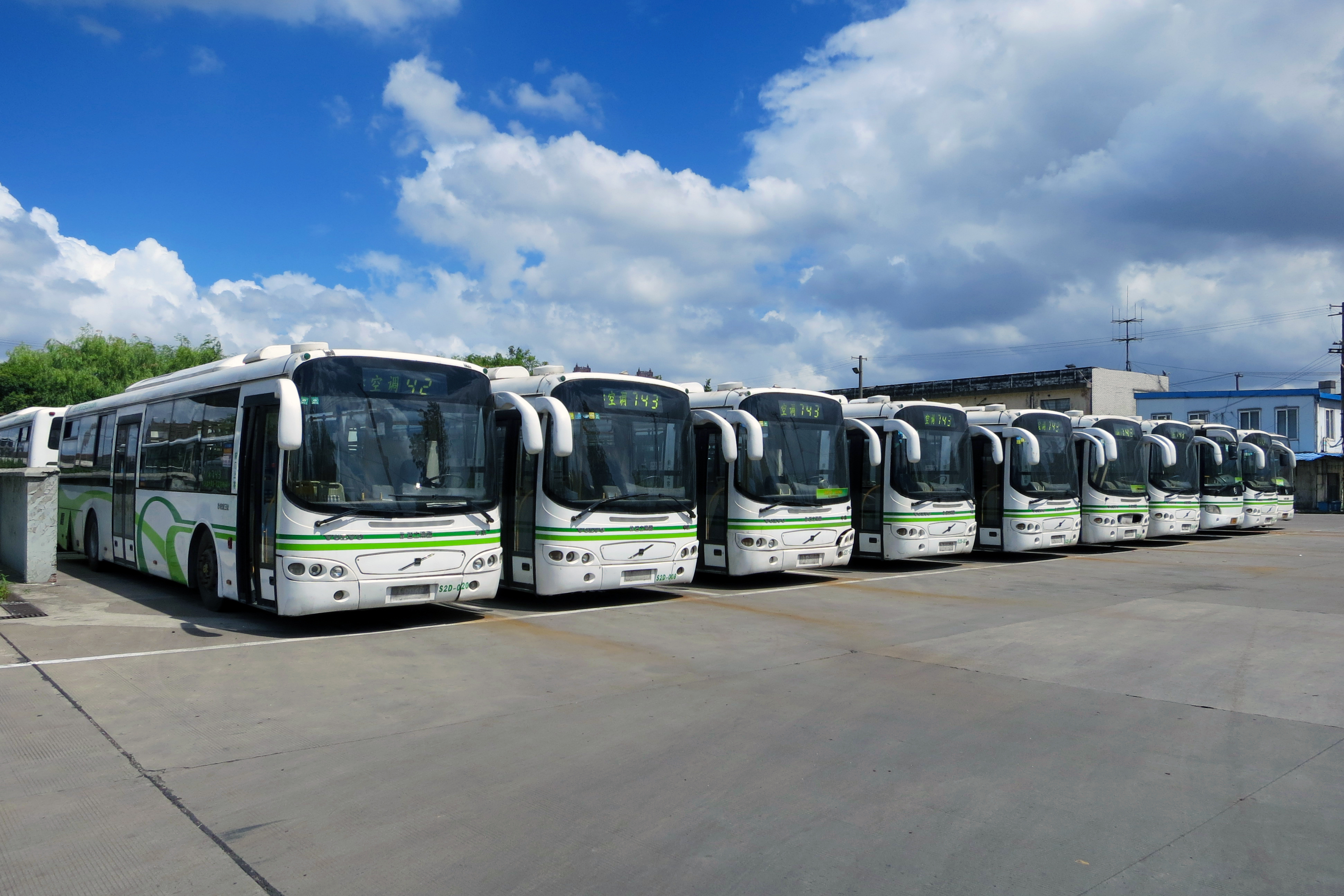
A row of Volvo B7RLE built by Sunwin. The Volvo B7RLE, along with the B6R and B7R, are examples of Volvo buses manufactured for Shanghai.

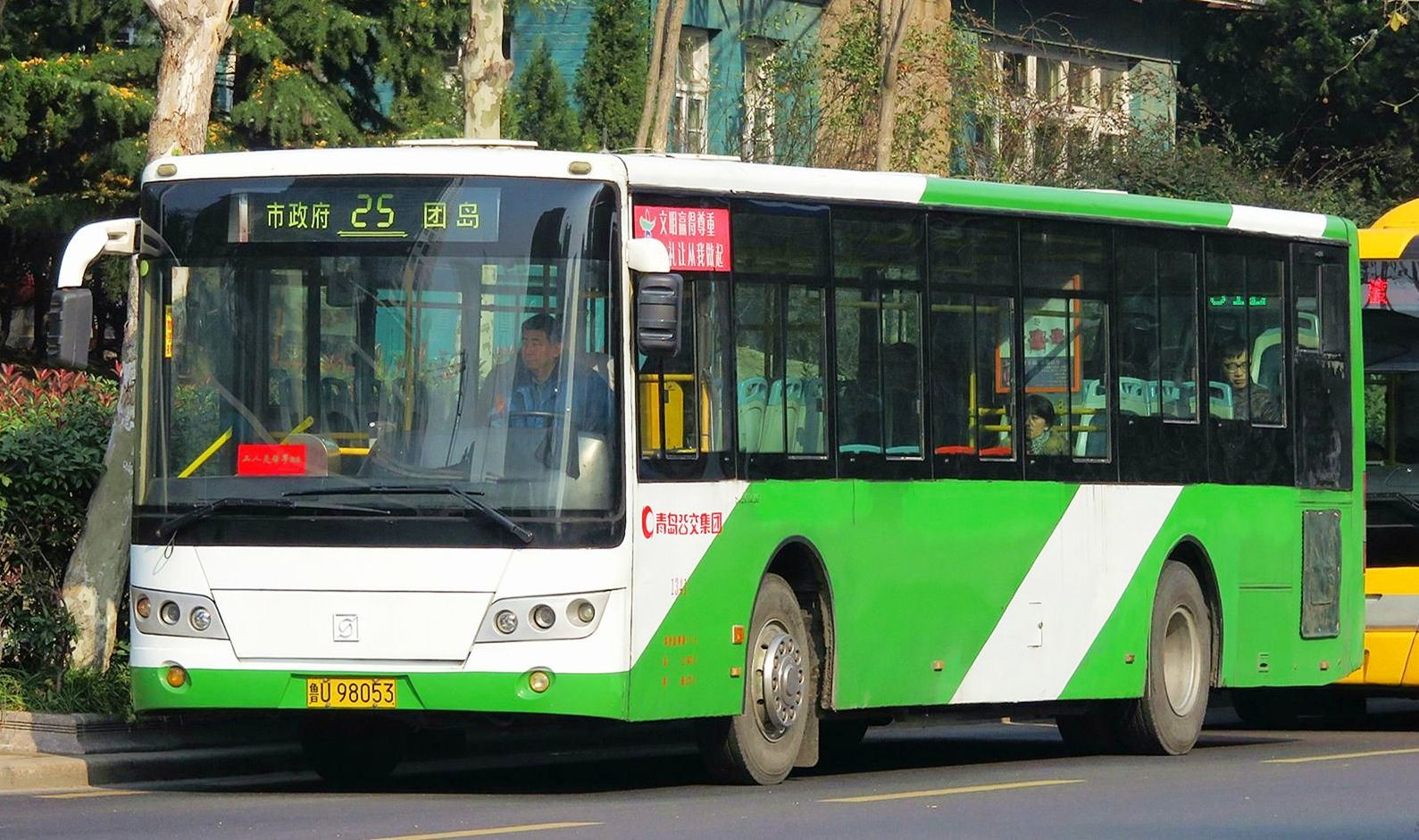
With the introduction of the SWB6116 series, which were built under the brand of Sunwin itself (instead of Volvo), the type saw purchases by many Chinese cities, such as Qingdao

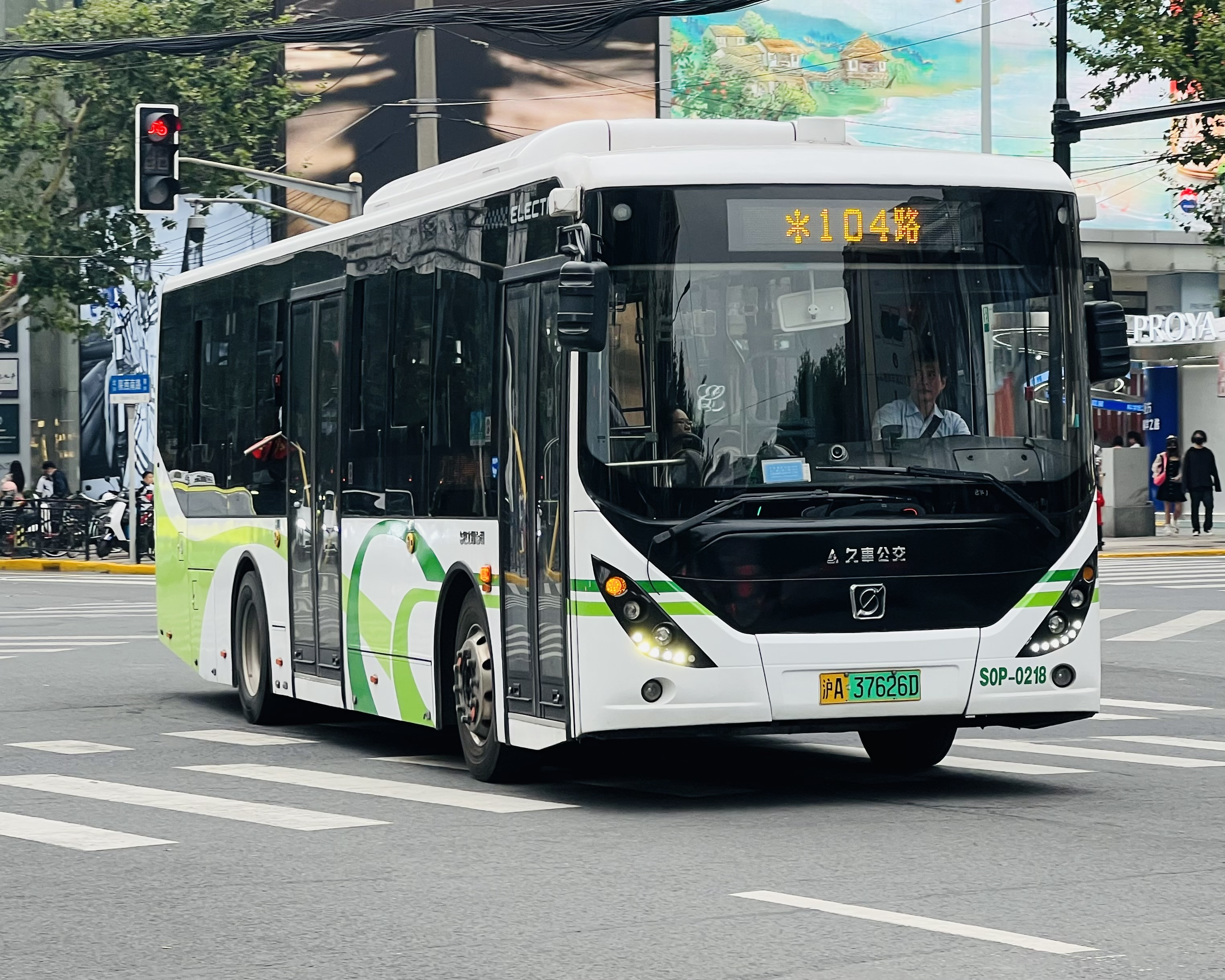
After Volvo pulled out of the joint venture with SAIC, Sunwin began producing buses under its own brand only.

=== Before formation of Sunwin ===
The first agreements between SAIC and Volvo were signed in 1996, forming the basis for the later creation of a joint-venture company. This agreement was created with the guidance of Shanghai Municipal government and various national level commissions. A final agreement on forming the joint-venture was signed on 2000/6/30.

The predecessor bus manufacturing companies in Shanghai were consolidated in the lead-up to forming Sunwin, reforming the Shanghai Bus Manufacturing Company and Shanghai Feiyi Automobile Manufacturing Company into Shanghai Bus Manufacturing Company, Ltd. The new company had a total of 3500 workers and a capacity to manufacture 3000 bodies and chassis each per year.

=== After formation of Sunwin ===
Sunwin was established in 2000/8/8 as a joint venture between SAIC Motor (its bus division then Shanghai Bus Factory) and Volvo with a 50% stake each, to learn from foreign developments and provide a superior bus product to the domestic Chinese market, which lacked a suitable low-floor product. These buses were widely introduced for the APEC China 2001 event, and became a symbol of safe, quality, environmental and aesthetic product. The goal was to be able to build 2000 city buses and 500 intercity buses per year.

In 2001, the main technology introduced was the Volvo B7RLE and B7R bus and chassis, respectively. These developments allowed Sunwin to design buses, which through using this chassis, were quieter, conforming to Euro II standards, more durable and being more comfortable. Based on the newly introduced B7R chassis and body designed in collaboration with Volvo, Sunwin started building CNG buses conforming to Euro III standards in the same year. While Compressed natural gas (CNG) buses were fairly common worldwide then, this was still rather foreign in China.

By 2003, Sunwin had already reached its initial goal of producing 2500 city buses and 500 intercity buses per year, reached in part due to the popularity of the new products, which were produced under stricter Volvo quality control. It also gained two large contracts of 2010 and 1000 buses from two bus operators in Shanghai, to be delivered over 5 and 3 years, respectively. Sunwin developed maintenance contracts along with their buses, allowing the new products to average an in-service rate of 98% by streamlining and removing the previously convoluted maintenance procedures. The new low-entry configuration SWB6125 was the first vehicle in China to have an independent air-conditioning system.

Although Volvo technologies were very advanced, the price was too high for many Chinese cities, at ¥800000. To cater to other cities, Sunwin developed a cheaper SWB6116 bus with the permission of Volvo to use their brand on it. This was built with the technologies gained from constructing Volvo buses, and was intended to introduce the bus into more markets, where better products were unaffordable.

Sunwin had originally intended to participate in the emerging BRT market of China, and gain up to 85% of the Chinese market in 2005. However, in 2006, its market share was still 0%, and Sunwin had not yet demonstrated an adequate BRT product. Instead, the Beijing BRT purchased Changjiang-Iveco and Youngman articulated buses.

=== Volvo pulls out ===
In 2016, Volvo sold its remaining shares of Sunwin to SAIC Motors, thus leading to them pulling out of the joint venture and making Sunwin a wholly owned subsidiary of SAIC.
