= Nissan Diesel Space Runner RM =

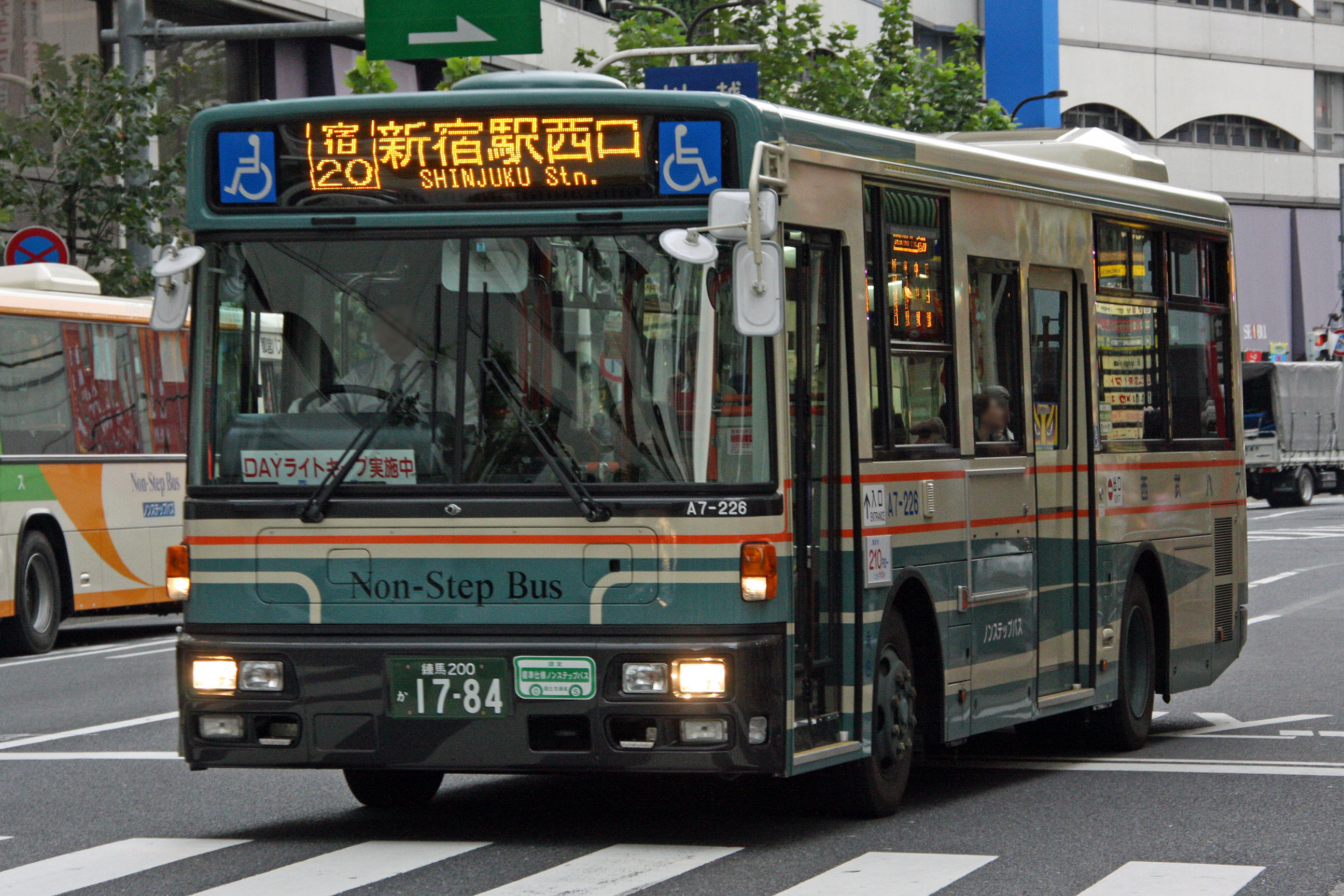

Overview
- Manufacturer: Nissan Diesel
- Production: 1975–2010

Body and chassis
- Class: Complete bus Bus chassis
- Body style: Single-decker bus
- Doors: 1 or 2
- Floor type: Low floor 2-steps or 1-Step entrance
- Related: Nissan Diesel Space Runner RA

Powertrain
- Engine: ED6, FD6, FE6, J07E, 6M60
- Transmission: UD (5 or 6 speed manual), ZF (5-speed automatic)

Dimensions
- Length: 8.2 metres to 8.9 metres
- Width: 2.3 metres
- Height: 3.0 metres

The Nissan Diesel Space Runner RM (kana:日産ディーゼル・スペースランナーRM) was a medium-duty single-decker bus produced by the Japanese manufacturer Nissan Diesel (now known as UD Trucks) from 1975 until 2010. The range was only primarily available as city bus. It can be built as either a complete bus or a bus chassis.

It has a similar styling to the larger Space Runner RA that it has a rounded roof dome similar to the Space Runner RA with a double-curvature windscreen and a separately mounted destination blind.

== Models ==
- RM90 (1975)
- K-RM80 (1979)
- P-RM81 (1984)
- P-RB80 (1988)
- U-RM/JM210 (1990)
- KC-RM/JM211/250 (1995)
- KK-RM/JM252 (1999)
- PB-RM360 (2004)
- PDG-RM820 (2007)
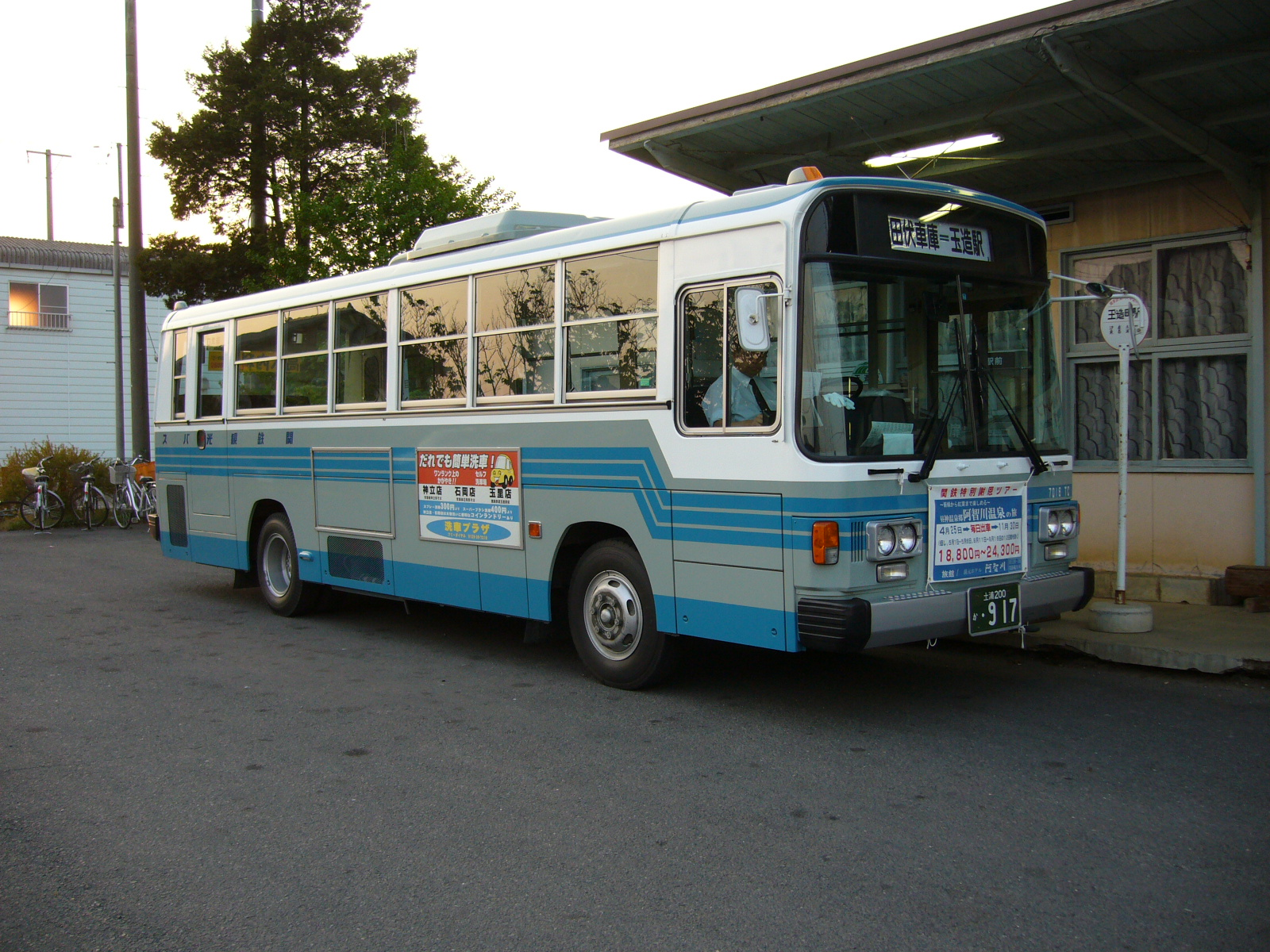
P-RM81G

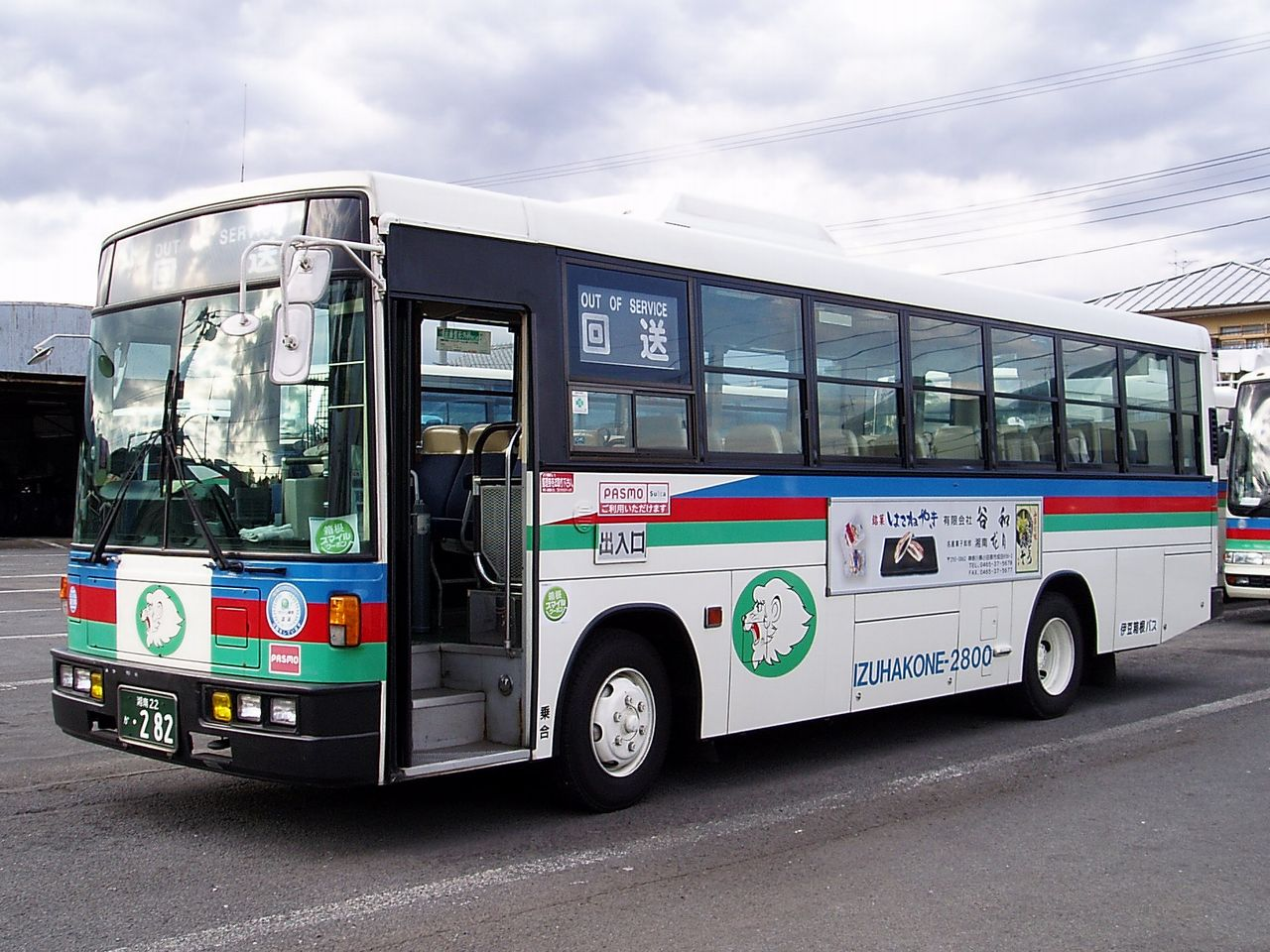
KC-RM211GAN

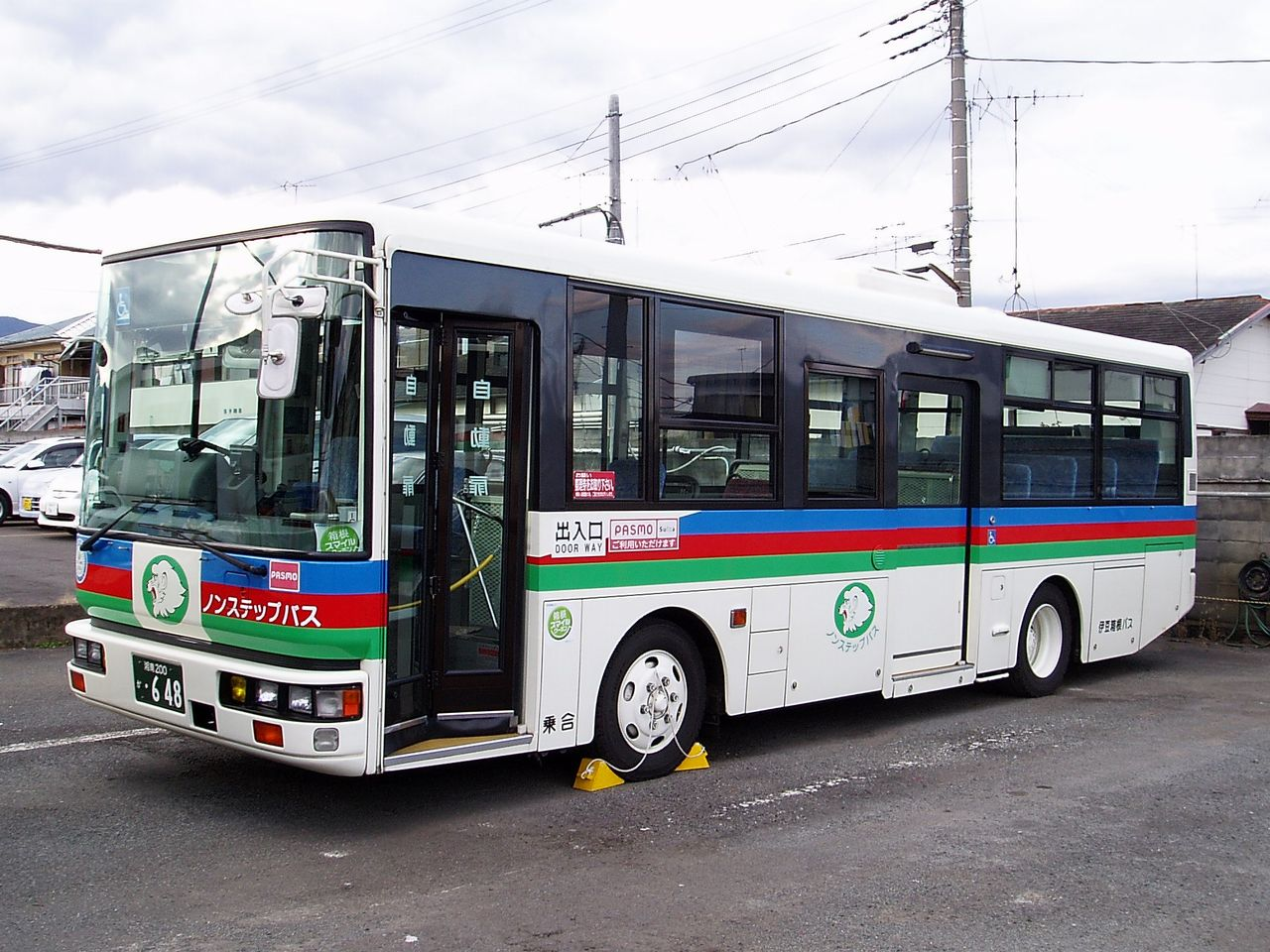
KK-RM252GAN

== Competitors ==
- Hino Rainbow
- Hino Rainbow HR
- Isuzu Erga Mio
- Mitsubishi Fuso Aero Midi
- Mitsubishi Fuso Aero Midi-S
