= Mitsubishi Fuso Aero Midi =

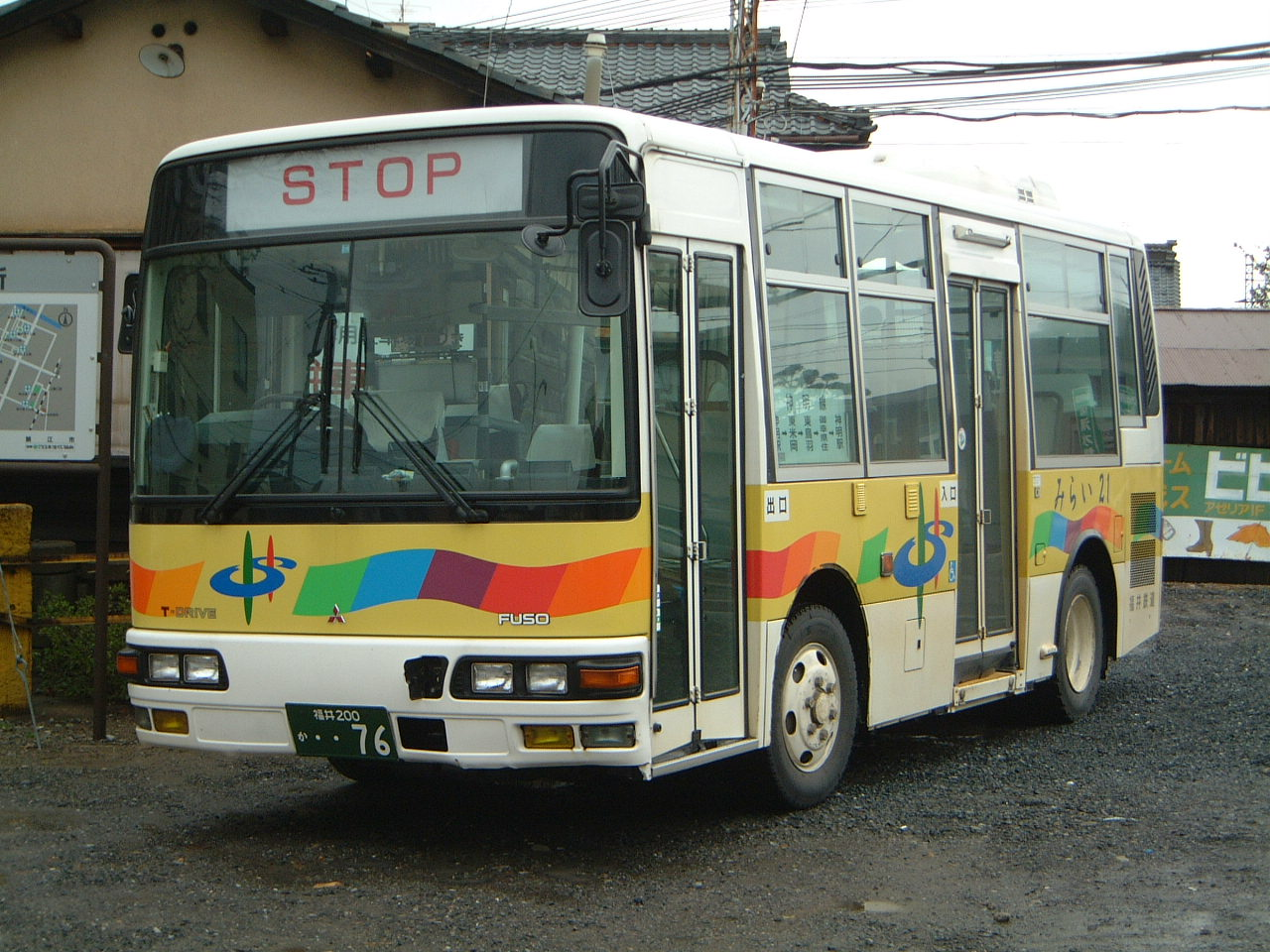

Overview
- Manufacturer: Mitsubishi Motors Corporation (1988–2002); Mitsubishi Fuso Truck and Bus Corporation (2003–present)
- Production: 1988–present

Body and chassis
- Class: Complete bus Bus chassis
- Body style: Single-decker bus (short, medium & long body)
- Doors: 1 or 2
- Floor type: Step-entrance; Low entry Low floor
- Related: Mitsubishi Fuso Aero Bus; Nissan Diesel Space Runner JP; Nissan Diesel Space Runner RM

Powertrain
- Engine: 6D14, 6D15, 6D16, 6D17, 6M60, 6M61, 4M50
- Transmission: 5 or 6-speed manual, 5-speed automatic (-2012), 6-speed manual (2012- )

Dimensions
- Length: 7.0m to 10.5m
- Width: 2.3m or 2.5m
- Height: 3.0m

Chronology
- Predecessor: Mitsubishi Fuso MK Series

The Mitsubishi Fuso Aero Midi (kana: 三菱ふそう・エアロミディ) is a step-entrance, low entry and low floor midibus produced by the Japanese manufacturer Mitsubishi Fuso. It is primarily available as public buses and sightseeing buses ranged from lengths of 7.0m to 10.1m. The range can be built as either a complete bus or a bus chassis.

The Mitsubishi Fuso MK Series was built between 1974 and 1988. The Aero Midi appeared in 1988 after the replacement for the MK Series. The Aero Midi ceased production in 2007 and replaced by the Aero Midi-S in 2008. After the Aero Midi-S ceased production in 2010, production of the Aero Midi city bus recommenced in the following year. The Mitsubishi Fuso Aero Midi is the low entry and smaller version of the low floor Mitsubishi Fuso Aero Star city bus.

== MK Series (1974-1988) ==
- MK103H (1974)
- MK115 (1976)
- K-MK116 (1979)
- P-MK116/516 (1984)
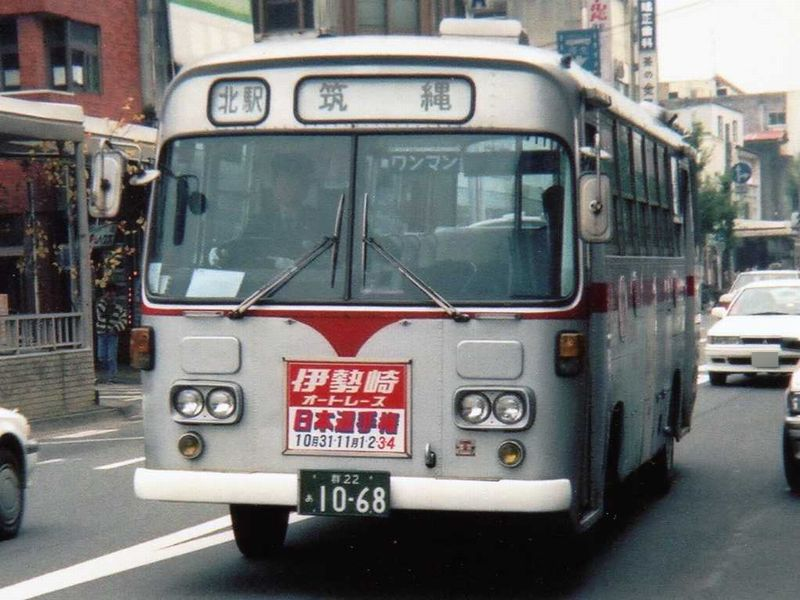
MK MK115H

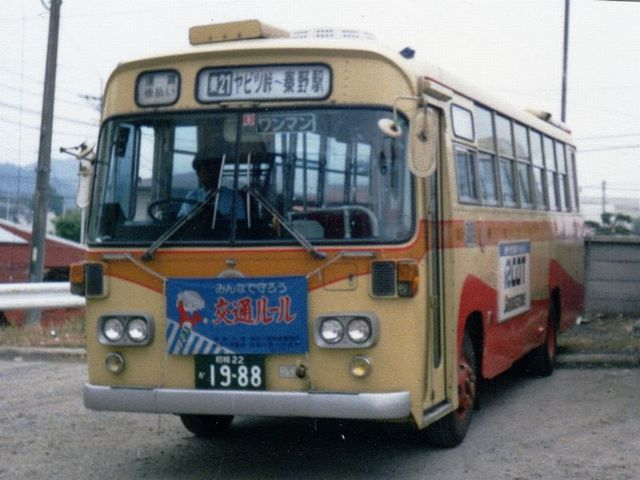
MK K-MK116H

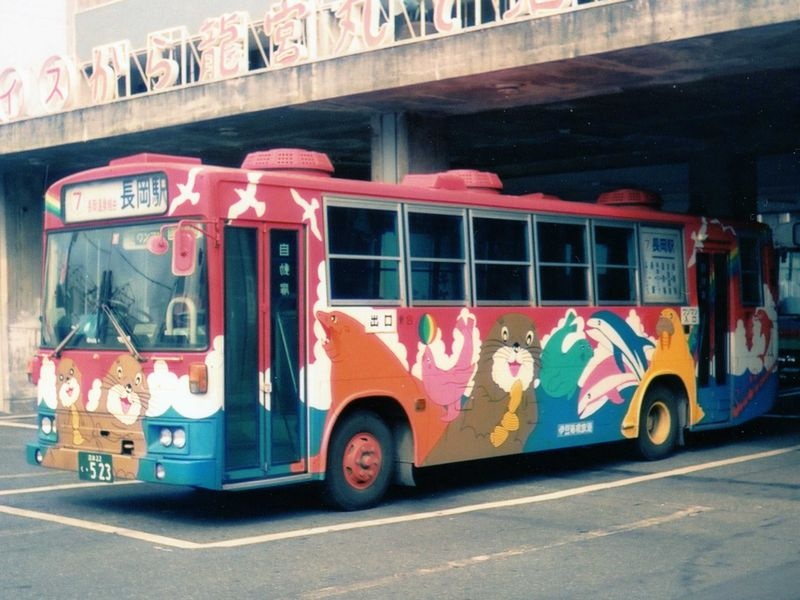
MK P-MK116J

== Aero Midi (First generation, 1988-1993) ==
- P-MK117/126/517 (1988)
- P-MM117/517 (1988)
- P-MJ117/527 (1988)
- U-MK117/517 (1990)
- U-MJ517/527 (1990)
- U-MM117/517 (1990)
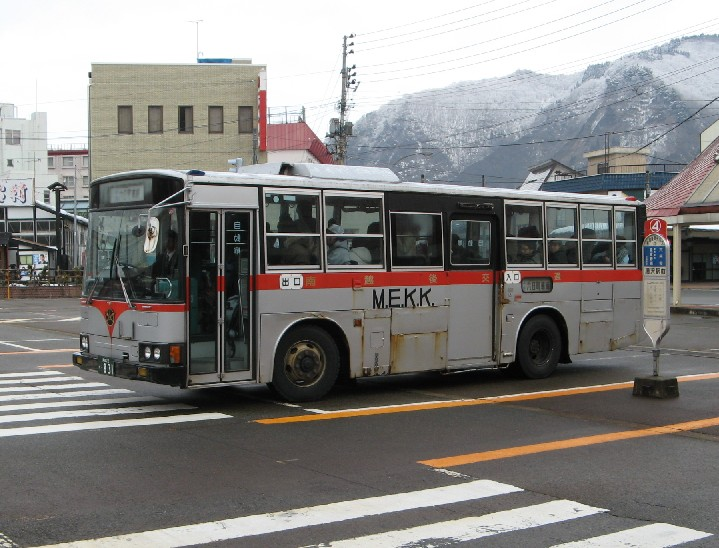
Aero Midi P-MM117J

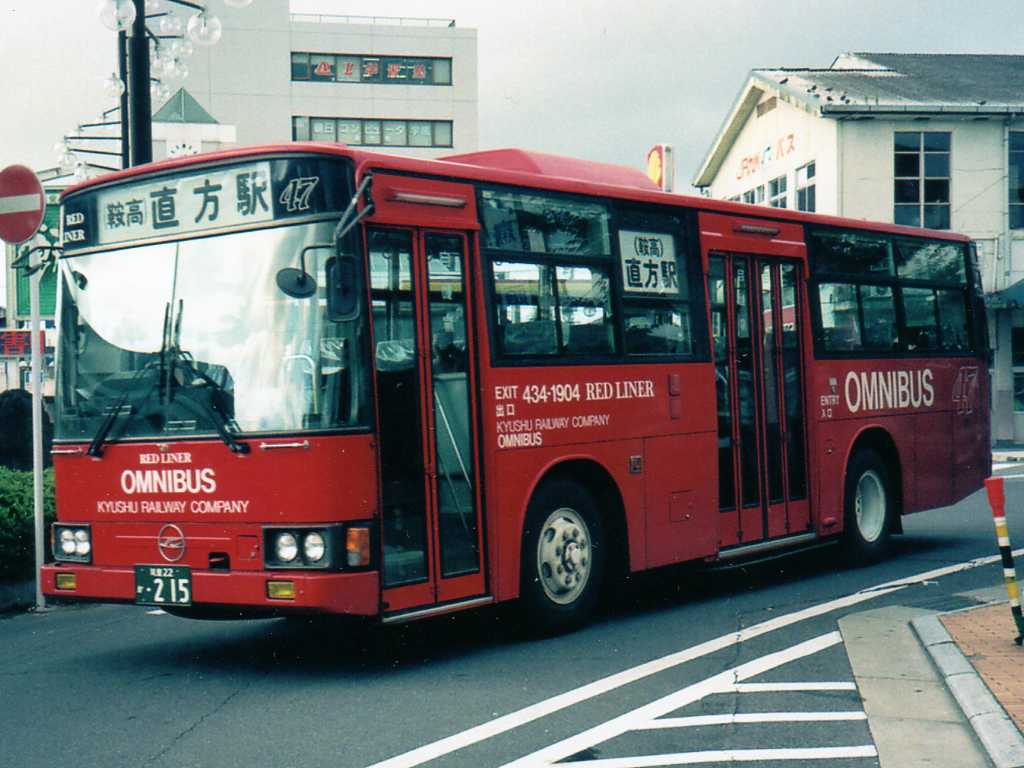
Aero Midi U-MM517J

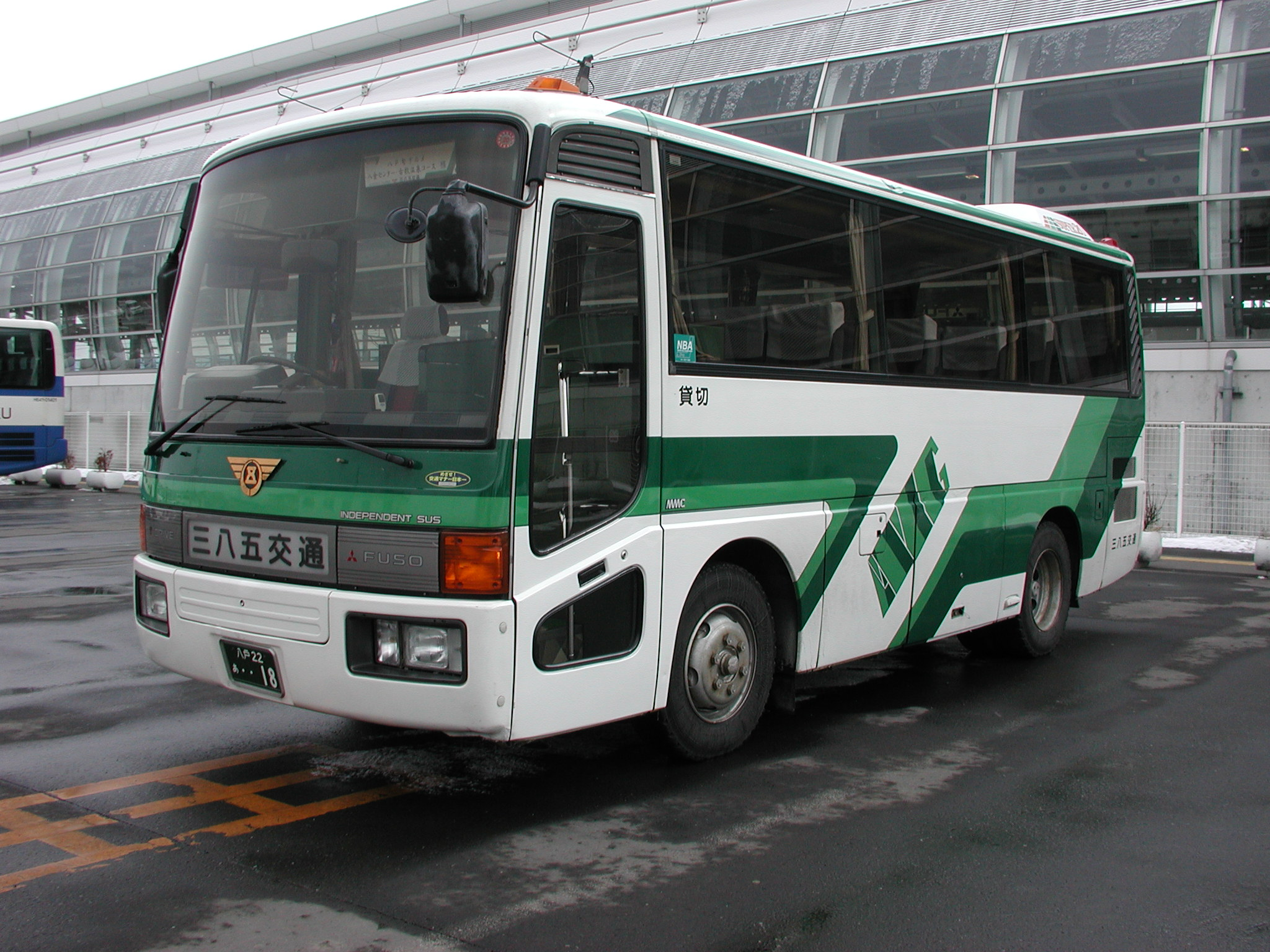
Aero Midi P-MJ527F

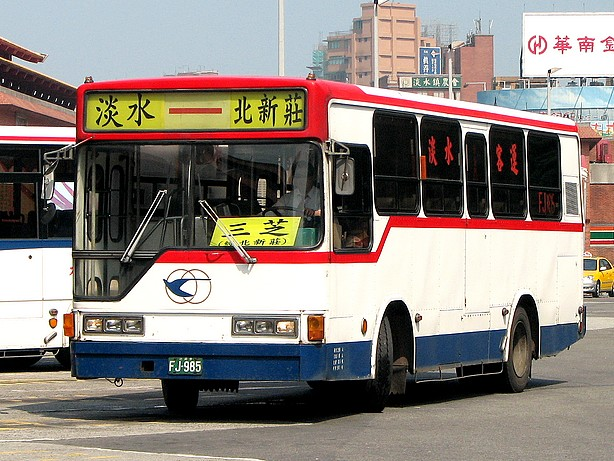
Fuso MK117JL bus chassis with 6D16 engine in Taiwan.

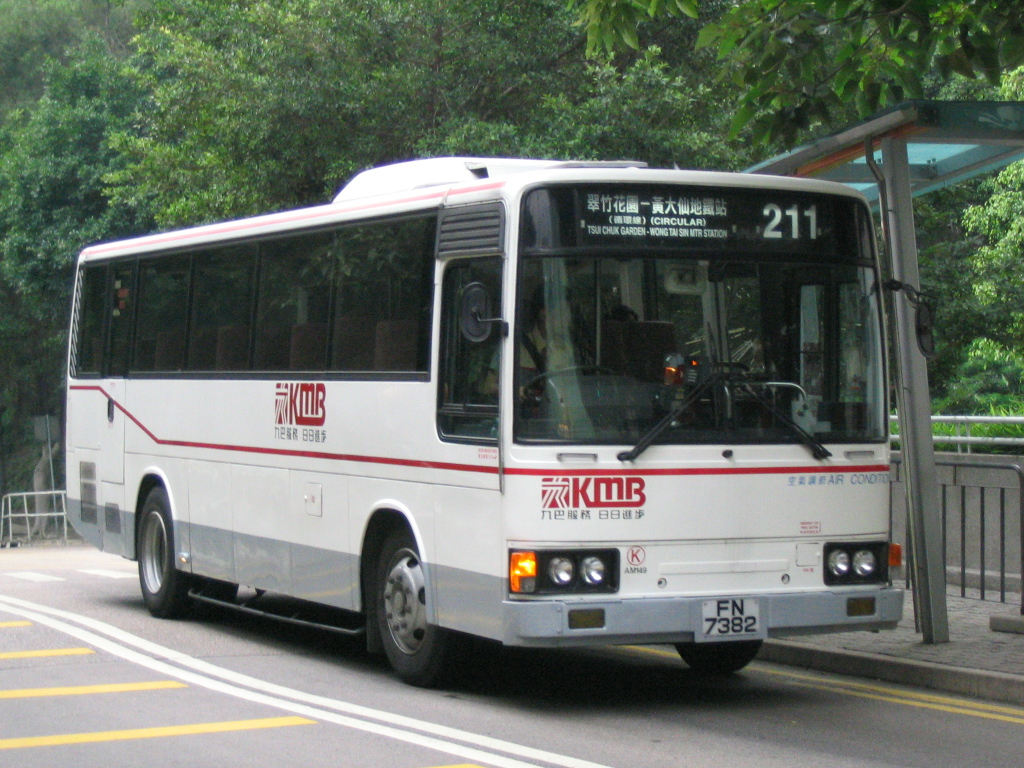
Fuso MK117J in Hong Kong operated by Kowloon Motor Bus

== Aero Midi (Second generation, 1993-2007, 2011-present) ==
- U-MK117/218/517/525/527/595/618 (1993)
- U-MJ217/628 (1993)
- KC-MK219/619 (1995)
  - KC-MK219J (One-step bus, 1998)
- KC-MJ218/629 (1995)
- KK-MK23/25/26/27 (1999)
- KK-MJ23/26 (1999)
- KK-ME17 (2002)
- PA-MK17/25/27 (2005)
- PA-MJ26 (2005)
- PA-ME17 (2005)
- SKG-MK27 (2011)
- TKG-MK27 (2012)
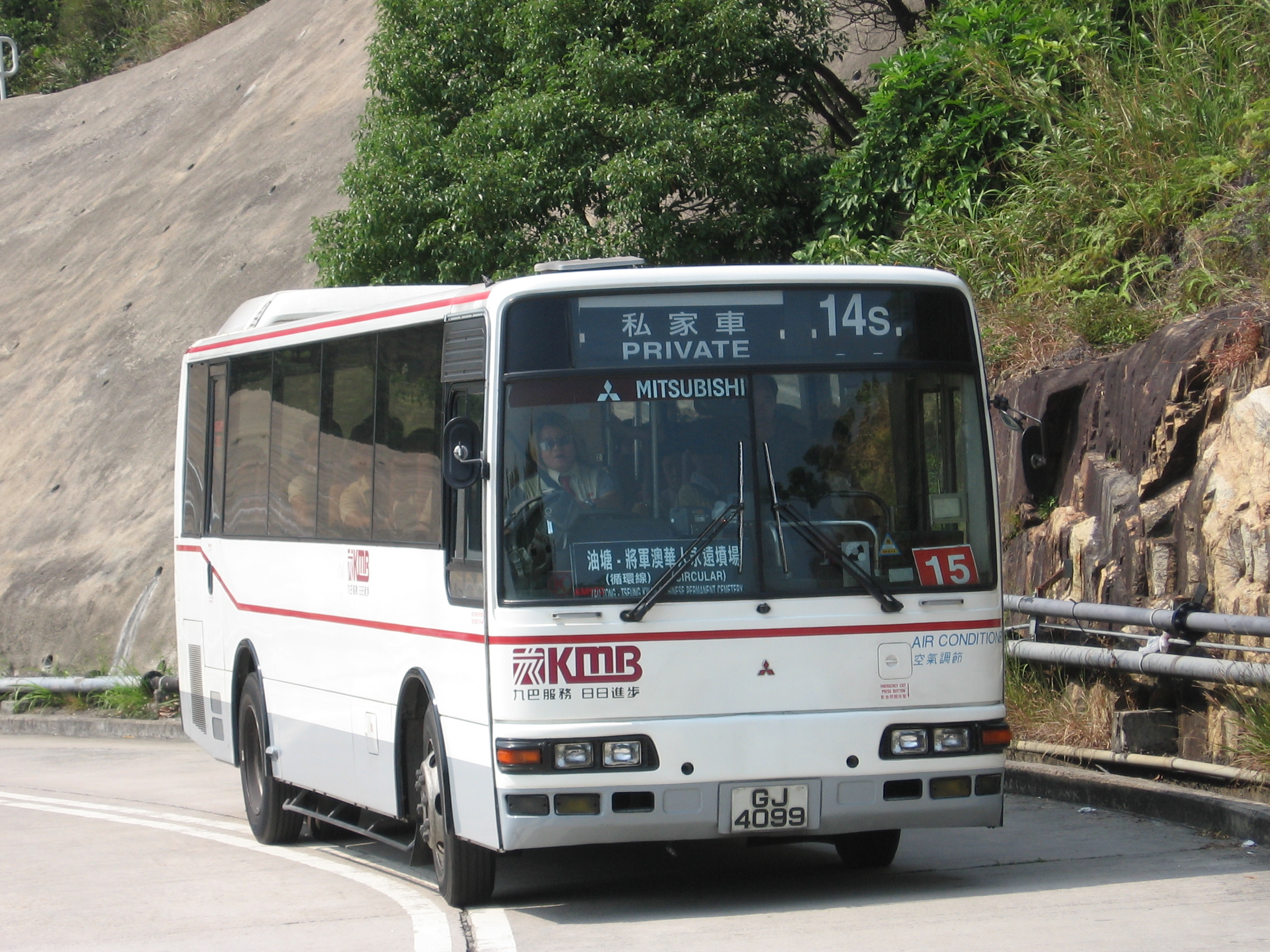
MK217J in Hong Kong operated by Kowloon Motor Bus

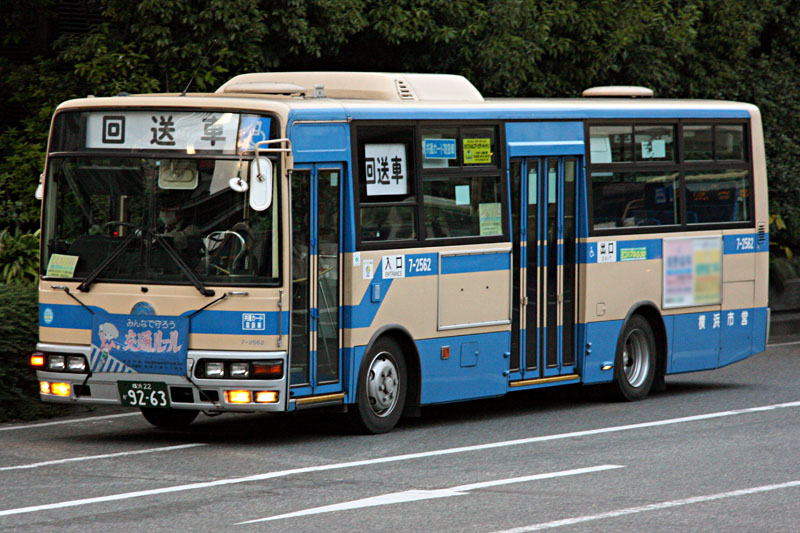
Aero Midi One-step KC-MK219J

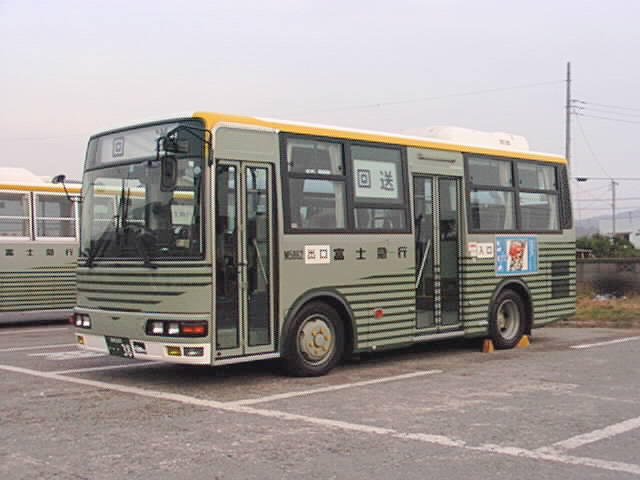
Aero Midi KC-MJ218FVF

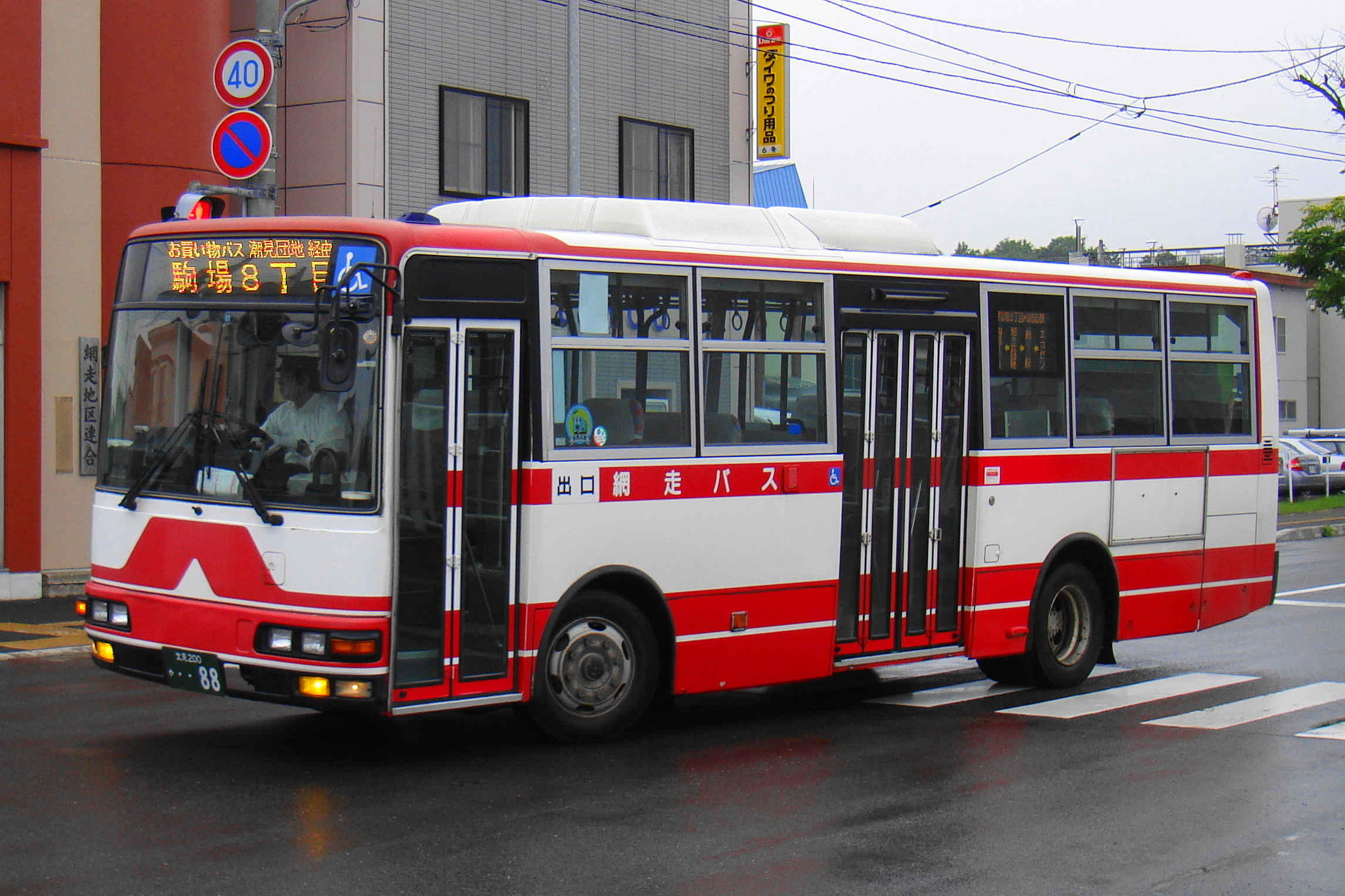
Aero Midi One-step KK-MK23HH

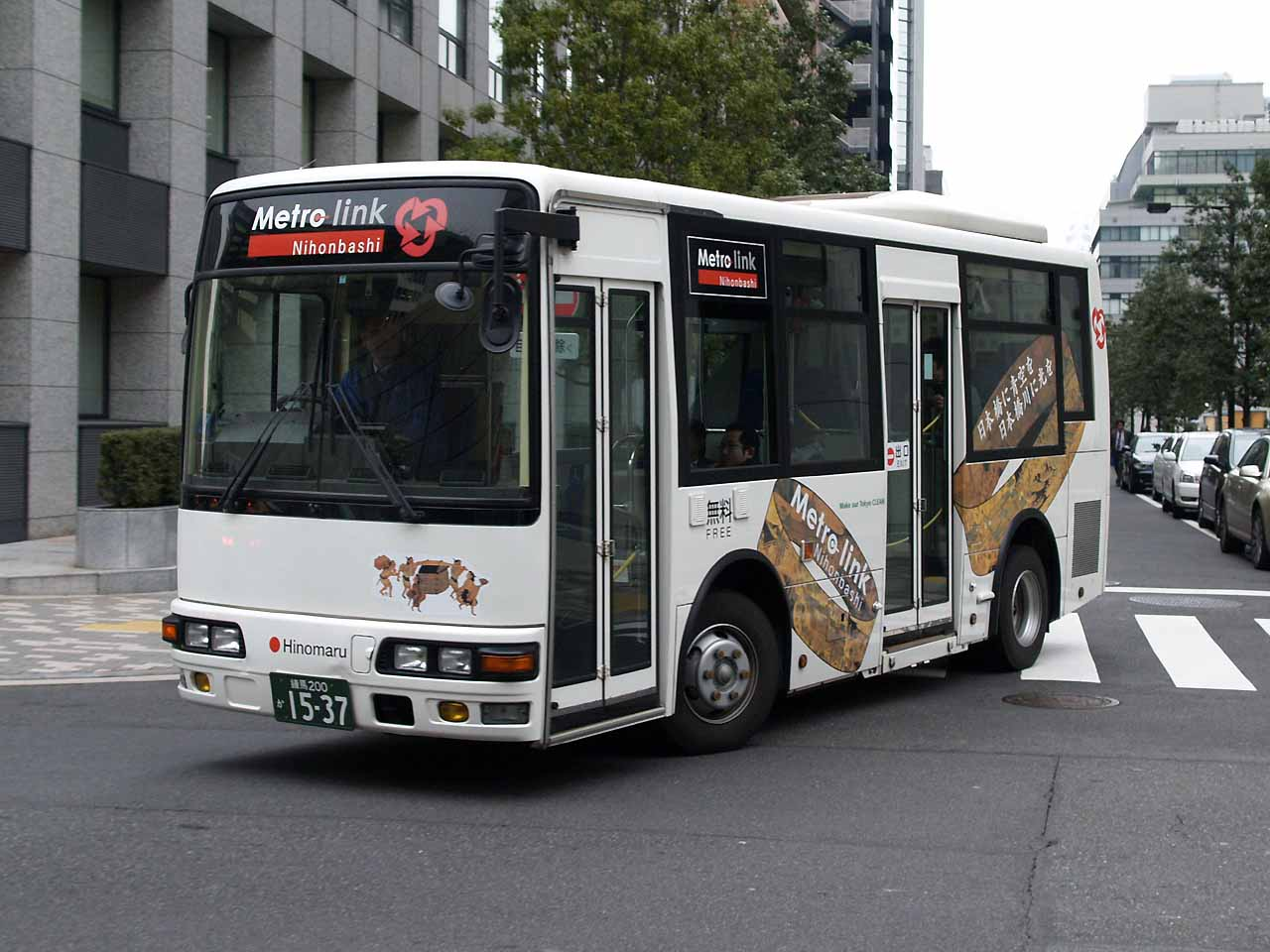
Aero Midi PA-ME17DF

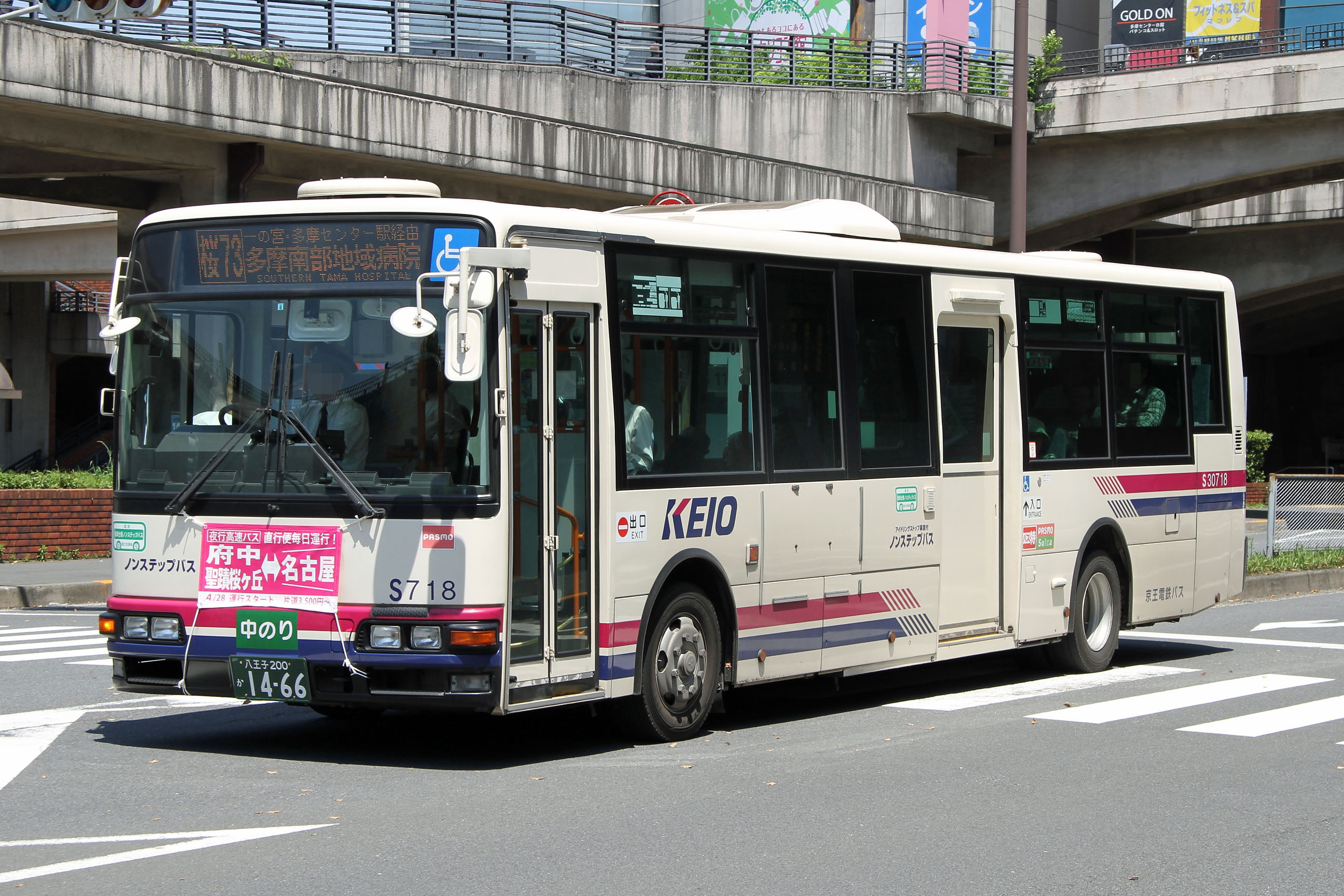
Aero Midi Non-step PA-MK27FM

== Aero Midi-S (2008-2010) ==
The Aero Midi-S is a rebadged Nissan Diesel Space Runner RM and Nissan Diesel Space Runner JP. A common design is that it has a rounded roof dome (similar to the Nissan Diesel Space Runner RM and the Nissan Diesel Space Runner JP) with a double-curvature windscreen and a separately mounted destination sign.

- PDG-AR820 (2008)
- PDG-AJ820 (2008)
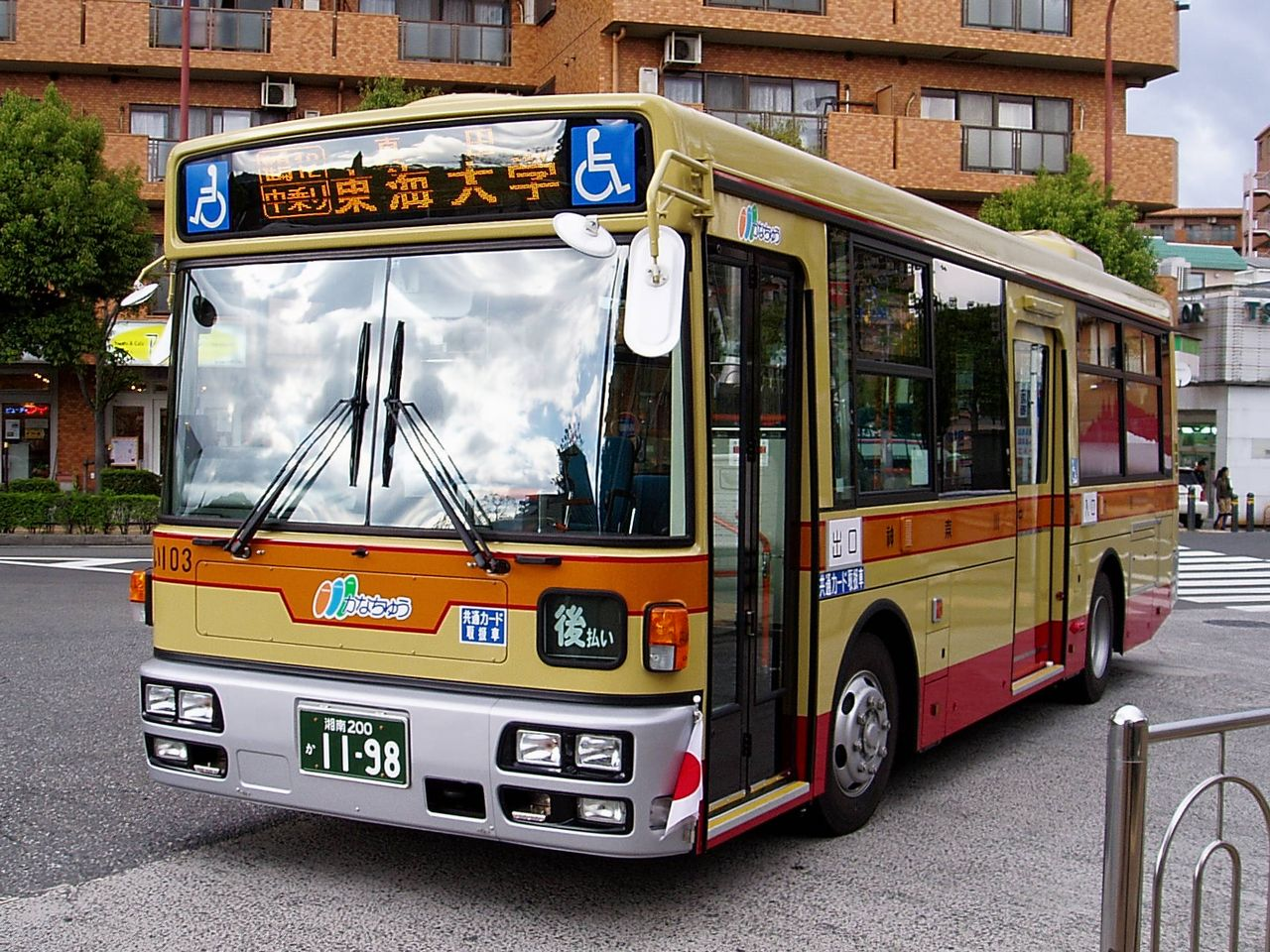
Aero Midi-S AR PDG-AR820GAN

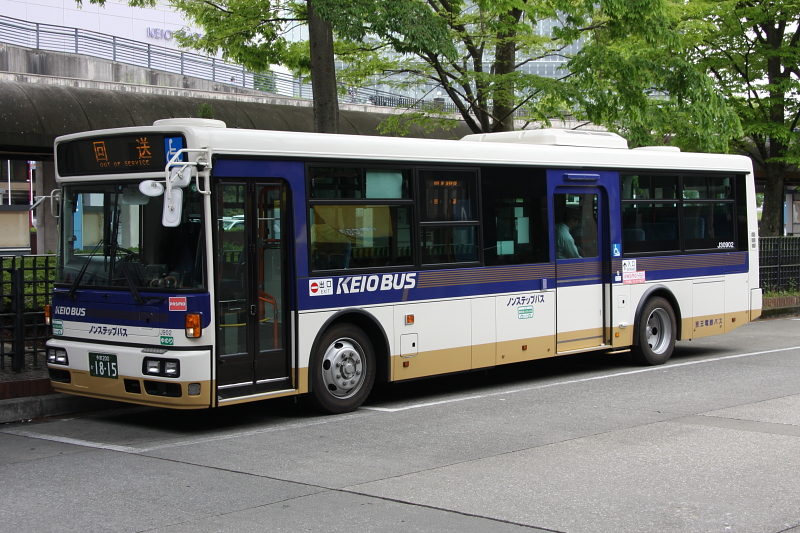
Aero Midi-S AJ Non-Step PDG-AJ820NAN

== Model lineup ==
- MK Tour 9m
- MK Line Non-step bus 10.5m, 9m
- MK Line One-step bus 9m
- MJ Tour 7m
- ME Line Non-step bus 7m

== See also ==
- Mitsubishi Fuso Truck & Bus Corporation
- List of buses
