= Bedford JJL =

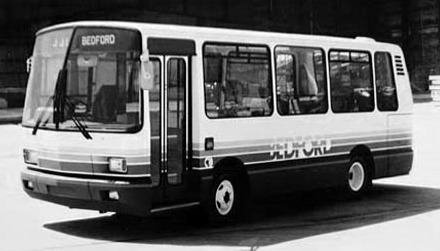

Overview
- Manufacturer: Bedford

Body and chassis
- Doors: 1
- Floor type: Step entrance

Powertrain
- Engine: Bedford 330

The Bedford JJL was an innovative but ultimately unsuccessful midibus model built by Bedford. The JJL could have been a success, but was ahead of its time in predicting the boom in the midibus market, as seen by the success of the Dennis Dart.

Only four JJLs were produced, along with a pre-production prototype, starting in 1979. The production vehicles produced were as follows:

Chassis number	Number plate	Bodywork code	Seating	Built
IRK0JL9008	UKK 335X	Marshall 260250	B24F	1981
IRK0JL9009	AVS 903T	Marshall 260251	B24F	November 1978
IRK0JL9010	EKX 648T	Marshall 260252	B24F	1978
IRK0JL9011	HKX 553V	Marshall 260253	B24F	November 1979

The build date of the first chassis may indicate that this was the prototype that was converted to a production bus, although the bodywork numbers and build dates conflict with those found in.

Maidstone Borough Council took delivery of the JJLs in 1981/82. UKK 335X and AVS 903T were sold to Brighton Buses, and then to Northern Bus, Sheffield in 1992. EKX 648T also went to Brighton, but was scrapped in 1988 after a collision with a tree. HKX 553V was sold to Bournemouth Transport (trading as Yellow Buses) in 1983, and then onto The Goodman Group, where it saw service with Rambler and Goodmans coaches. It is the last JJL in service and has been exhibited at rallies. HKX553V was sold in 2018 to a collector from Aylesbury

In 1985, Bedford considered reviving the JJL. Marshall SPV had the idea to reintroduce the JJL under the Marshall Bus brand, although the deal never caught on. Tricentrol of Dunstable produced a short version of Bedford's YMQ chassis, the YMQ/S, ten years after the JJL.
