= Interstellar Pig =

1984 novel by William Sleator

- Cover of the 2004 Firebird (Penguin Group) paperback edition
- Author: William Sleator
- Cover artist: Cliff Nielson
- Language: English
- Series: Interstellar Pig series
- Genre: Science fiction
- Publisher: Bantam
- Publication date: 1984
- Publication place: United States
- Media type: Print (Hardcover & paperback)
- Pages: 196 (Bantam Starfire edition, paperback)
- ISBN: 0-14-037595-3
- OCLC: 32717218
- Followed by: Parasite Pig

Interstellar Pig, published in 1984 by Bantam Books, is a science fiction novel for young adults written by William Sleator. It was listed as an ALA Notable Book, a SLJ Best Book of the Year, and a Junior Literary Guild Selection.

== Plot ==
When Zena, Manny, and Joe move into the cinder-block cottage next door, Barney is intrigued by their glamorous, exotic lifestyle. His fascination grows when Zena introduces Barney to their favorite pastime: Interstellar Pig, a board game in which the key objective is to finish the game with the Piggy card in hand.

Zena quickly briefs him on the rules: each player picks their character from a box of cards depicting different aliens. Every alien race has its own strengths, weaknesses, and IRSC (Interstellar Relative Sapience Code, with lower numbers favorable). When the time runs out, every home planet will be obliterated except the one belonging to the holder of the Piggy. Barney is amazed when the neighbors keep choosing the same character cards: Joe repeatedly picks water-breathing Jrlb; Zena always chooses Zulma, an arachnoid nymph; and Manny always picks Moyna, an octopus-like gas bag.

While snooping through Zena's underwear drawer, Barney finds a manuscript written by Captain Latham— the same Captain who had built the house that Barney and his parents were renting— telling of the event that caused his brother to go crazy. At sea, the Captain rescued a man floating in the ocean, described as having a "leathery, greenish, reptilian hide" due to sunburn and a "swollen contusion", "yellow and filmed with slime" on his forehead. Insisting that the man is the Devil, the Captain's brother strangles him—and in punishment, is keelhauled. Although he survives, his mind is damaged due to the oxygen deprivation, and he spends the rest of his life locked in his room (which later became Barney's bedroom), scratching patterns into the wooden walls and clinging to the strange trinket he had taken from the murdered man's corpse.

That night Barney begins to see a pattern in the marks the Captain's brother had scratched into the window of his bedroom: all the scratches centered on a particular rock on a nearby island. Remembering the trinket "to which [the brother] clung as he was pulled from the water, to which he still clings", Barney decides to go out to the boulder and see if the trinket had been hidden there. He finds a small, silver, round object:

There was a face carved in this side, nothing but a rigid, slightly smiling mouth under a single wide-open eye... Crude as it was, the thing seemed alive. And it was the brutal wrongness of it, the mouth smiling with such placid idiocy, noseless, under the solitary gaping eye, that made the face so repellent. The Piggy.

Barney realizes that the game is real, the clock is running, and his neighbors— aliens in disguise— will do anything to get the Piggy. Each tries to bribe him with a unique incentive, similar to the Judgement of Paris, but Barney turns them down. Unfortunately, by doing so, he's just entered the real game as a player representing the human race.

As Barney hurries to select his weapons and equipment before a horde of aliens descends on his cottage, he makes the startling discovery that he shares a psychic link to the Piggy. The Piggy tells him that it created the game so that it could be loved and appreciated, despite its tendency to detonate whole planets (and their surrounding solar systems) from time to time when it hiccups. Barney concludes that the object of the game is backward, and it is only the possessor of the Piggy that will be blown up.

Minutes before his home is destroyed, Barney concocts a plan to pass the Piggy off to another player convincingly enough so that it won't arouse suspicion. He tells the carnivorous lichen where to find the Piggy. However, as they approach it he realizes that the same logical inconsistency exists with Piggy's version of the story. He decides that the only explanation that makes sense is that Piggy created both stories in order to learn about new people. He abandons the Piggy and lets the lichen board their spaceship home, drawing off the other alien players. Once they depart, no damage is done to either the lichen or to Earth.

== The Piggy ==
Barney determines the Piggy to be a recording device created to learn about different races throughout the galaxy. The Piggy is sentient and can communicates, but often answers questions with irrelevant recordings.

"Are you the Piggy?" I thought at it. "Is that who you are?"
"Yn swlllyyybg k'sshhhhrlkthththwzzz," the voice replied, in a kind of reptilian gurgle.

== Alien Races ==
There are several alien races mentioned in the book.

The lichen are a race of carnivorous pseudo-sentient fungi. They are composed of masses of single-celled organisms who "cannot lie", which Barney uses to his advantage. He transforms into a lichen during combat and asks the neighboring lichen if it has ever seen the end of a game of Interstellar Pig. It denies this, and Barney concludes that no alien race has ever seen the ending - so the "timer" controlled by the Piggy might not even exist. In essence, the game would continue forever, allowing the Piggy to travel from species to species.

== IRSC ==
The Interstellar Relative Sapience Code is a number assigned to species determining their intelligence in the game. Barney has an IRSC of 93.7. The lower the IRSC, the higher the intelligence of the race. However, whether or not this applies outside the game is unclear; Barney exhibits superior critical thinking skills when fighting the aliens, even though they have lower IRSCs.

== Related works ==
- The sequel to this book, Parasite Pig, was published 18 years later, in 2002. The story picks up only a few months after the end of Interstellar Pig.
- A fictional film adaptation was referred to in the end of The Duplicate, another book by William Sleator.
- A fictional computer game is mentioned in chapter 2 of The Boy Who Reversed Himself, also by William Sleator.
- The mechanics of the "prototype" board game described in the novel are detailed enough to have inspired several fan-made games.
