= Stair (disambiguation) =

A stair is part of a flight of steps.

Stair may also refer to:

== Places ==
- Stair, Cumbria, England
- Stair, East Ayrshire, Scotland

== People ==
- Randy Stair (1992–2017), perpetrator of the Eaton Township Weis Markets shooting
- Sir Stair Agnew, (1831–1916), a Scottish public servant
- James Dalrymple, 1st Viscount of Stair (1619–1695), Scottish lawyer and politician
- John Dalrymple, 1st Earl of Stair (1648–1707), son of the previous
- John Dalrymple, 2nd Earl of Stair (1673–1747), son of the previous

== Other uses ==
- The Stair Society, a learned society for the study of Scots Law, named for Viscount Stair

== See also ==
- Stairs (disambiguation)
- House of Stairs (disambiguation)
- Staircase (disambiguation)
- Stairway (disambiguation)
- Step (disambiguation)
