= Stairs (disambiguation) =

Stairs are a set of steps.

Stairs may also refer to:

- Stairs (surname), list of people with the surname
- The Stairs, English rock band from Liverpool
- "The Stairs" (song), by INXS
- The Stairs (1950 film), short documentary
- The Stairs (1968 film), Polish animated short
- The Stairs (2016 film), Canadian documentary film
- Stairs (2019 film), 2019 action horror film
- The Stairs (2021 film)
- IBM STAIRS, IBM "Storage and Information Retrieval System" software
- Stairs (video game)
- "Stairs", a song by the 3rd and the Mortal from the album Painting on Glass

== See also ==
- House of Stairs (disambiguation)
- Stair (disambiguation)
