= Fuel cell bus =

Hydrogen powered bus

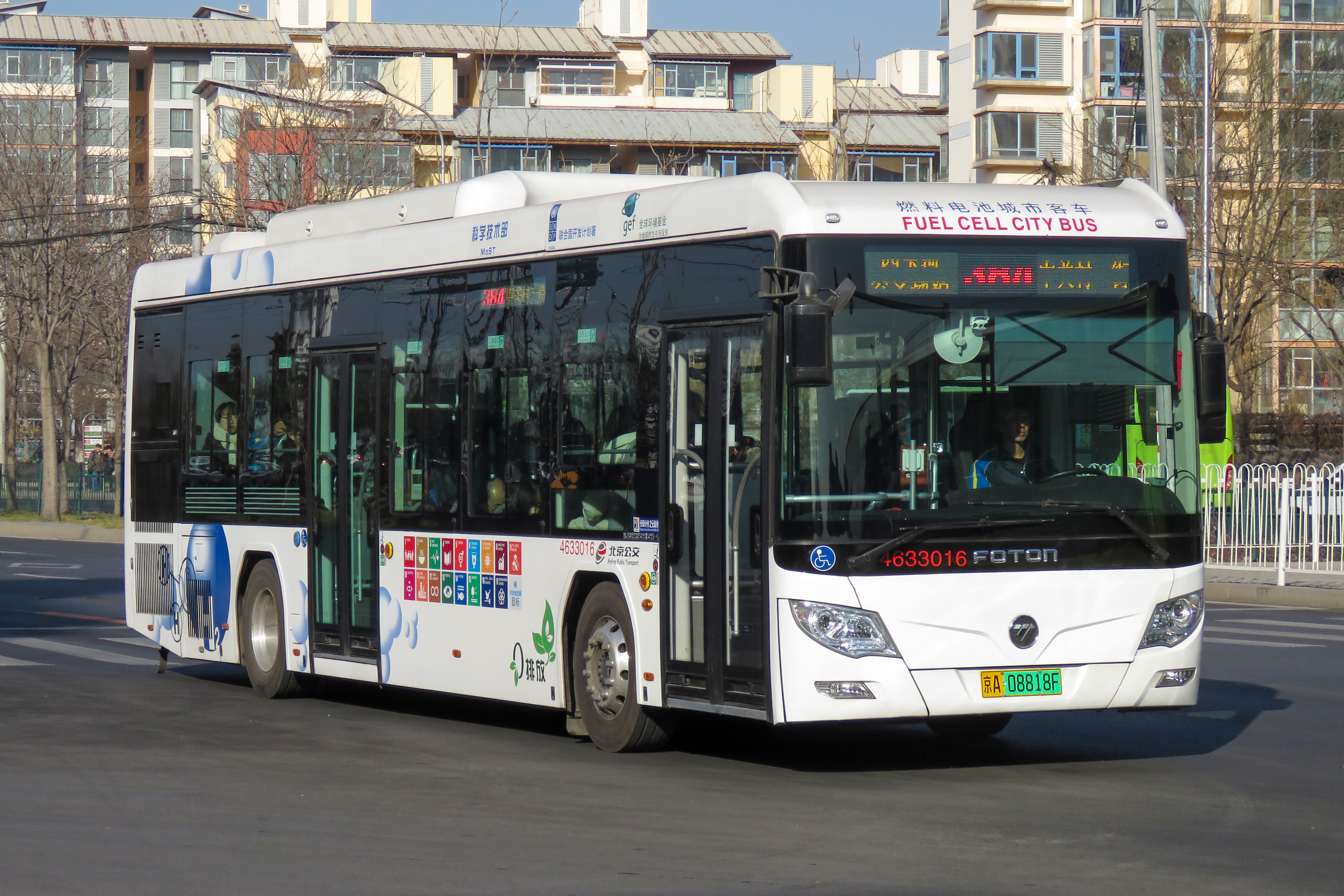
Foton Motor hydrogen fuel cell bus in Beijing, China in 2018

A fuel cell bus is a bus that uses a hydrogen fuel cell as its power source for electrically driven wheels, sometimes augmented in a hybrid fashion with batteries or a supercapacitor. The only emission from the bus is water. Several cities around the world have trialled and tested fuel cell buses, with over 5,600 buses in use worldwide, the majority of which are in China.

== Background ==
Owing to the greenhouse gas emissions and particulate pollution produced by diesel buses, transport operators have been moving towards greener and cleaner buses (such as hybrid electric buses and battery electric buses) since the early 2000s. However, battery electric buses lack range compared to diesel buses, take time to charge and have reduced energy storage in cold weather.

Transport operators have therefore evaluated alternatives such as hydrogen fuel cell buses. Hydrogen fuel cells generate electricity by reacting hydrogen and oxygen in the presence of a catalyst, the by-product of which is water. This electricity is used as a power source for an electric motor, which drives the wheels of the bus. Some companies have proposed using the fuel cell as a range extender, combining it with a larger battery or a supercapacitor. Hydrogen has a higher energy density than lithium batteries, making it suitable for heavy vehicles such as buses and trucks.

The provenance of hydrogen fuel varies – with green hydrogen (produced using renewable electricity) being significantly more environmentally friendly than brown hydrogen (produced by burning coal or lignite) or grey hydrogen (produced by steam heating natural gas).

== History ==
=== Initial tests and trials ===
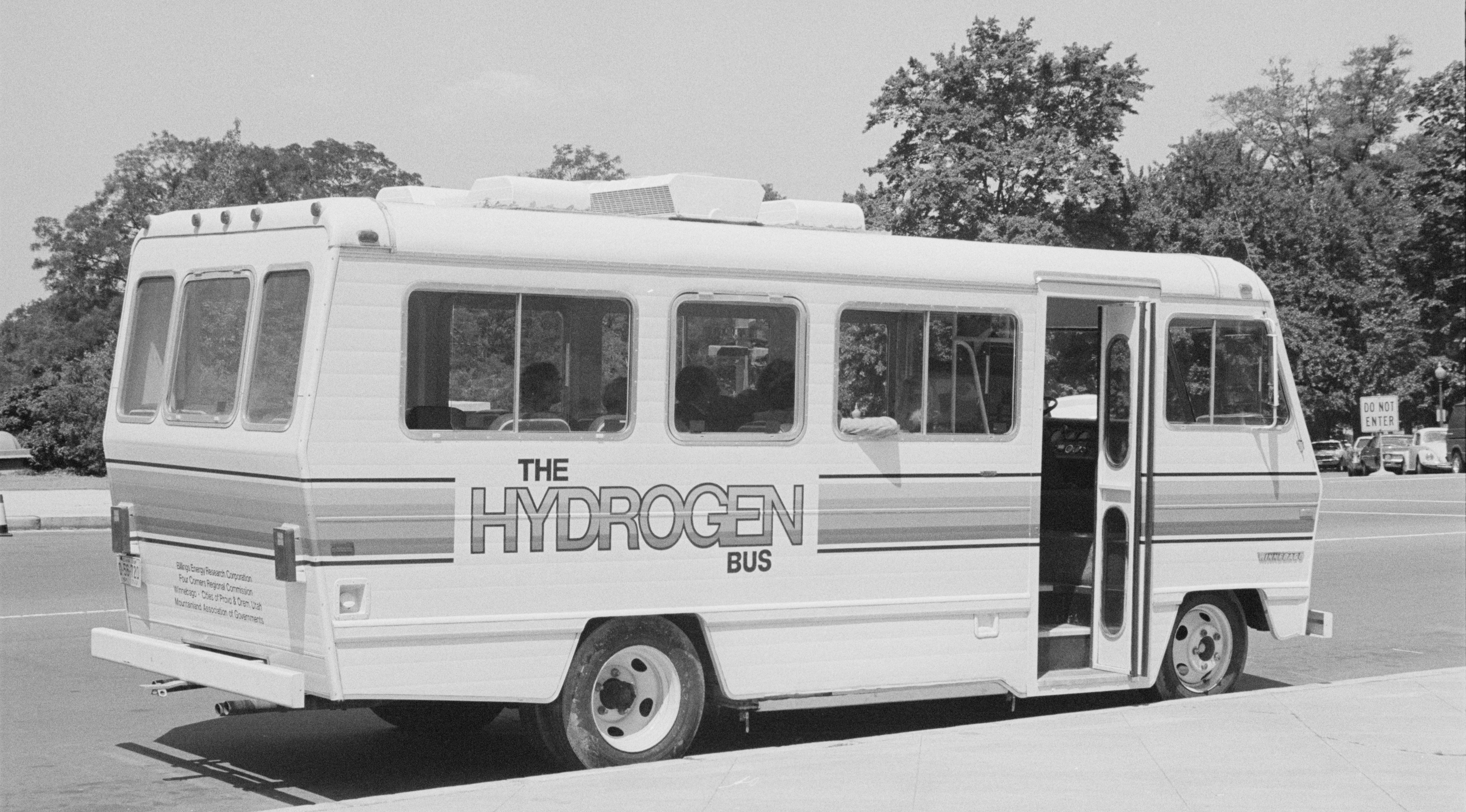
The Billings 'Hydrogen Bus' in 1976

In 1976, the Billings Energy Corporation tested a fuel cell minibus built on a Winnebago platform. It seated 19 passengers and ran on a 13 mile route from Provo to Orem, Utah. It was to be tested for the duration of one year.

Further research was done during the late 1980s, as raising concern regarding diesel emissions from buses led to experimentation regarding the use of fuel cells to power vehicles. Proof of concept work involved demonstrating that fuel cells could be packaged into a bus, and successfully power one. Between 1994 and 1995, the Georgetown Fuel Cell Bus Program (led by Georgetown University and the United States Department of Energy) demonstrated three 30 feet (9.1 m) buses powered by a phosphoric acid fuel cell from Fuji Electric.

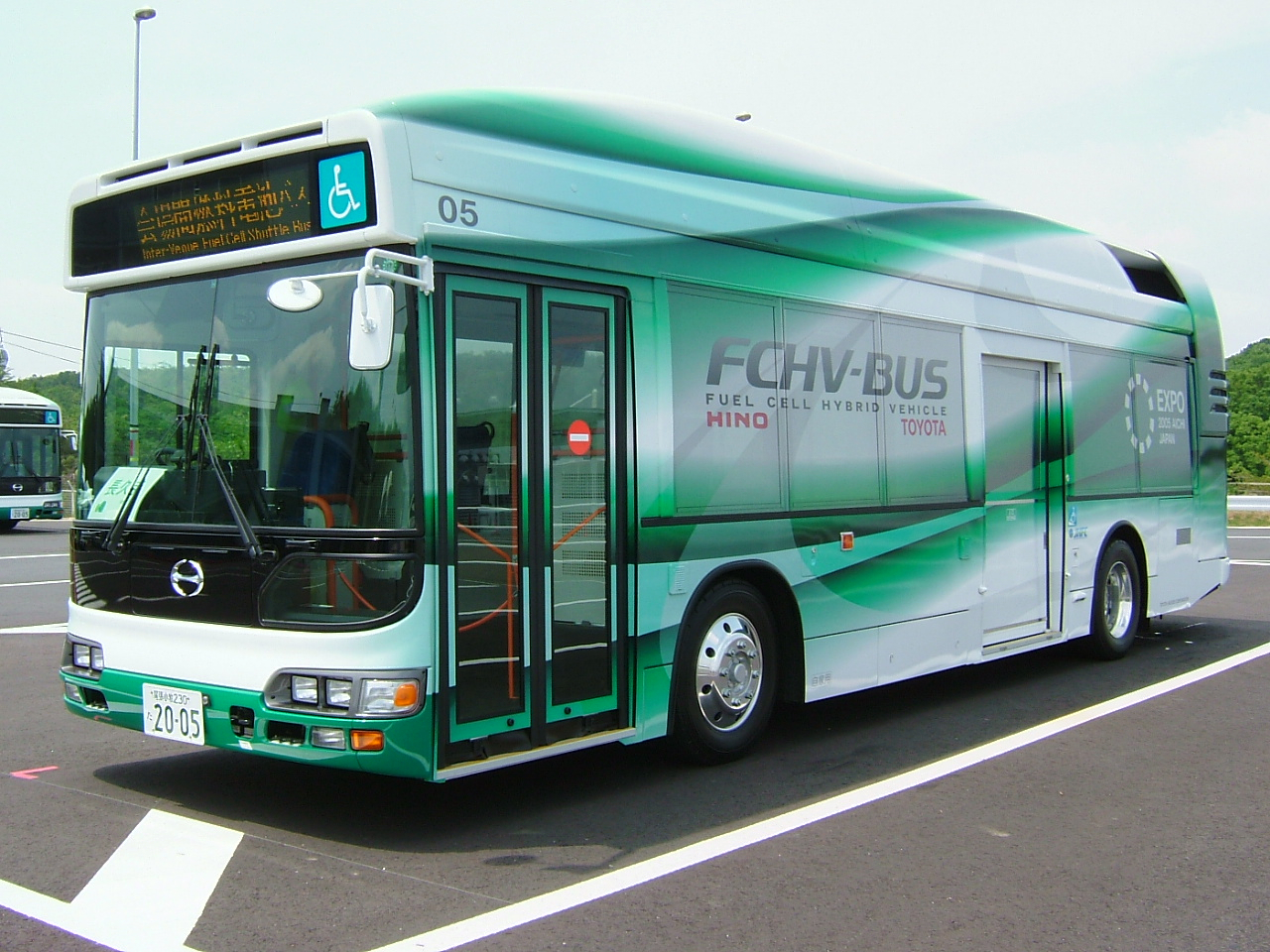
Toyota FCHV-BUS at Expo 2005 in Aichi, Japan in 2005

From the late 1990s, hydrogen-powered fuel-cell buses were trialled and experimented in a variety of cities. In 1998, Chicago and Vancouver began trials, using New Flyer Industries bus bodies and Ballard Power Systems hydrogen fuel cells. The three-year trial carried more than 200,000 passengers and travelled over 118,000 kilometers (73,000 mi).

From 2000, Hino and Toyota collaborated on the development of FCHV-BUS, a hydrogen fuel cell bus. After initial trials by Toei Bus in 2003, a fleet of 8 FCHV-BUS buses were then used at Expo 2005 in Aichi, Japan. During the Expo, they carried one million visitors and travelled about 130,000 kilometres. The buses were subsequently used as airport shuttle buses.

In the United States, the National Renewable Energy Laboratory (NERL) in the United States has been undertaking research work on hydrogen fuel cell buses since 2000, in collaboration with the Federal Transit Administration. AC Transit in the San Francisco Bay Area began trials of a hydrogen fuel cell bus in 2002.

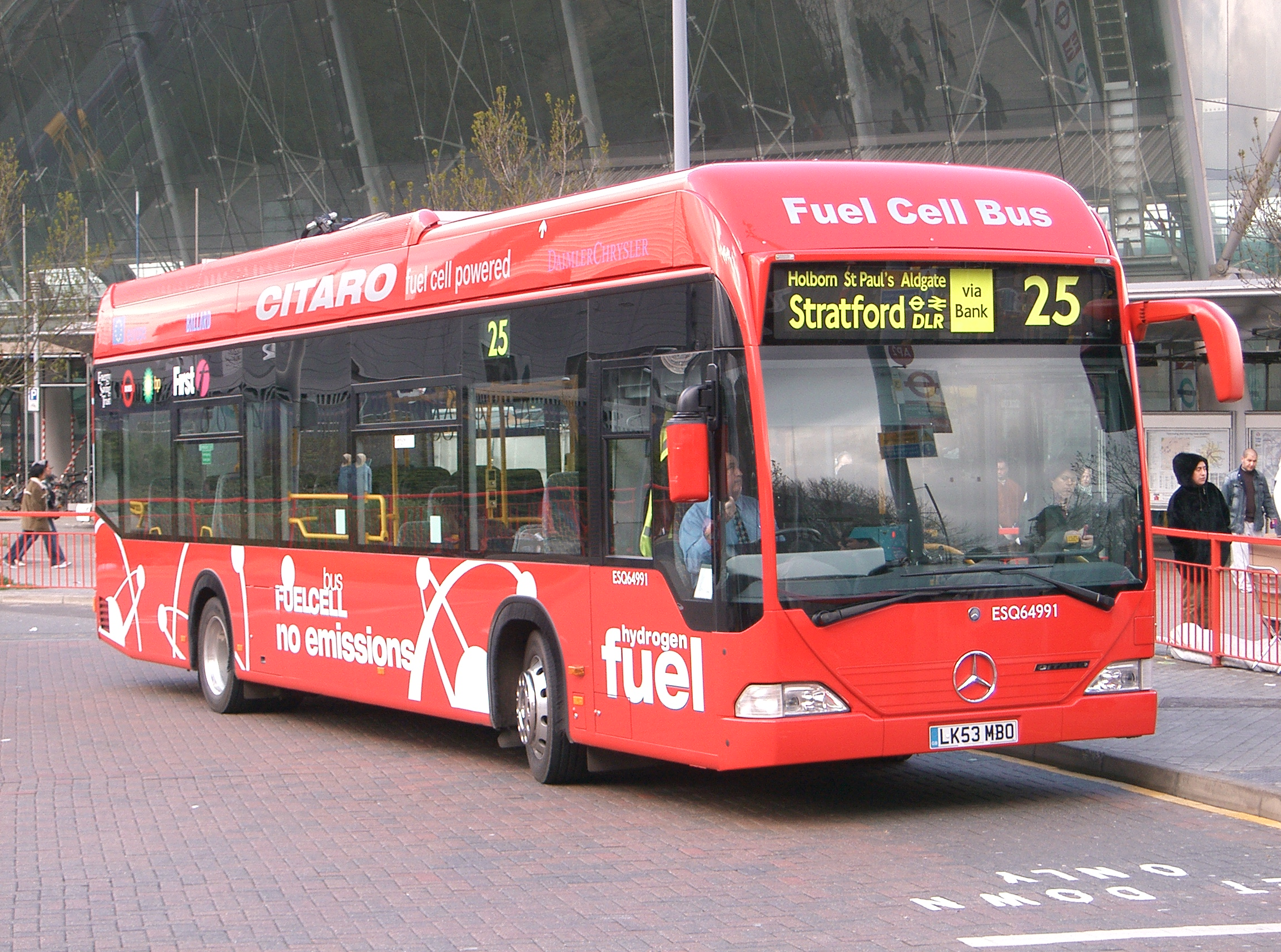
Hydrogen fuel cell Mercedes-Benz Citaro at Stratford, London in 2004

=== Clean Urban Transport for Europe ===
From 2001, the European Union supported research project Clean Urban Transport for Europe (CUTE) began running hydrogen fuel cell powered buses in nine European cities, including London, Madrid and Hamburg. The project was supported by a consortium of transportation operators, hydrogen infrastructure and fuel cell developers, universities and city authorities. Three other cities – Reykjavík, Beijing and Perth – took part in similar demonstration projects, supported by the same consortium. The Fuel Cell Bus Club became a forum to share experiences and information between cities and researchers.

All three projects used Mercedes-Benz Citaro buses, with hydrogen fuel cells from Ballard Power Systems. At the time they claimed to be the largest fleet of fuel cell buses in the world. The buses were estimated to cost US$1.2 million each and had a range of 300 kilometres (200 mi) and carried around 70 passengers.

Completed in 2007, the projects were deemed a success by researchers. However, the buses were criticised by some operators for their high cost of operation, with Madrid reporting that they were around ten times as costly to fuel. Dedicated hydrogen filling stations were also required to be built. The buses in Beijing – the first fuel cell buses in China – were withdrawn after one year, as air pollution reduced the efficiency and operating life of the fuel cells.

=== Further development ===
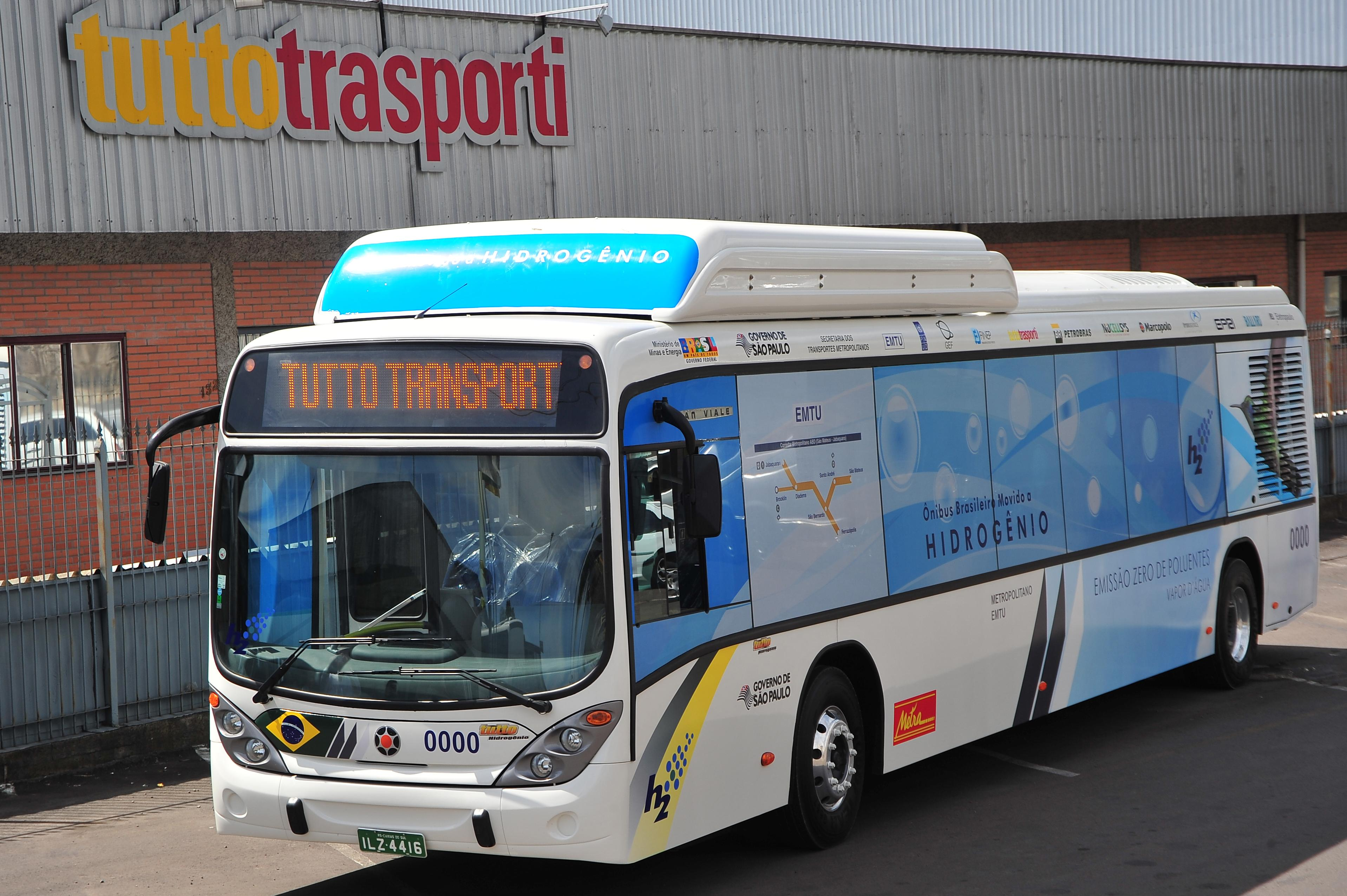
Hydrogen fuel cell bus in São Paulo, Brazil in 2009

In 2006, the Federal Transit Administration announced the National Fuel Cell Bus Technology Development Program. $49 million in federal grants would be provided to transit agencies to help develop and test hydrogen fuel cell buses, to improve the potential commercialisation of them. In 2003, AC Transit introduced a Thor “ThunderPower” bus into trial service, with tests complete by October 2004. In 2006, five Van Hool buses powered by UTC Power fuel cells entered service. These were replaced in 2010 by other Van Hool hydrogen fuel cell buses.

In 2009, BC Transit began operating fuel-cell buses in the town of Whistler in British Columbia, prior to the 2010 Winter Olympics. The fleet of 20 hydrogen fuel cell buses was the largest in the world at the time, with the project costing around $94 million. Unlike previous projects, the hydrogen used was blue hydrogen, produced by Air Liquide in Quebec using hydroelectricity. Due to high operating costs, the program halted in 2015.

The first Brazilian hydrogen fuel cell bus prototype began operation in São Paulo in 2009. The hydrogen bus was manufactured in Caxias do Sul. The programme, called "Ônibus Brasileiro a Hidrogênio" (Brazilian Hydrogen Autobus), includes three additional buses.

In 2010, eight hydrogen buses were introduced into service in London, with a substantially larger range than the fuel cell buses used in the mid-2000s. At the time, this was the largest hydrogen bus fleet in Europe. Transport for London acknowledged the high cost of the buses and the high cost in fuelling them, but noted that they "[expected] the costs to drop dramatically" as they become commercially viable.

In China, hydrogen fuel cell buses were used at Beijing 2008, Expo 2010 in Shanghai and the 2010 Asian Games in Guangzhou. These buses were developed by Higer Bus, with 3 deployed at Beijing 2008 and 196 at Expo 2010 in Shanghai.

In March 2015, Europe's largest fleet of hydrogen fuel cell buses entered service in Aberdeen, Scotland. 10 Van Hool buses were used on a five-year trial.

=== Large scale commercial introduction ===
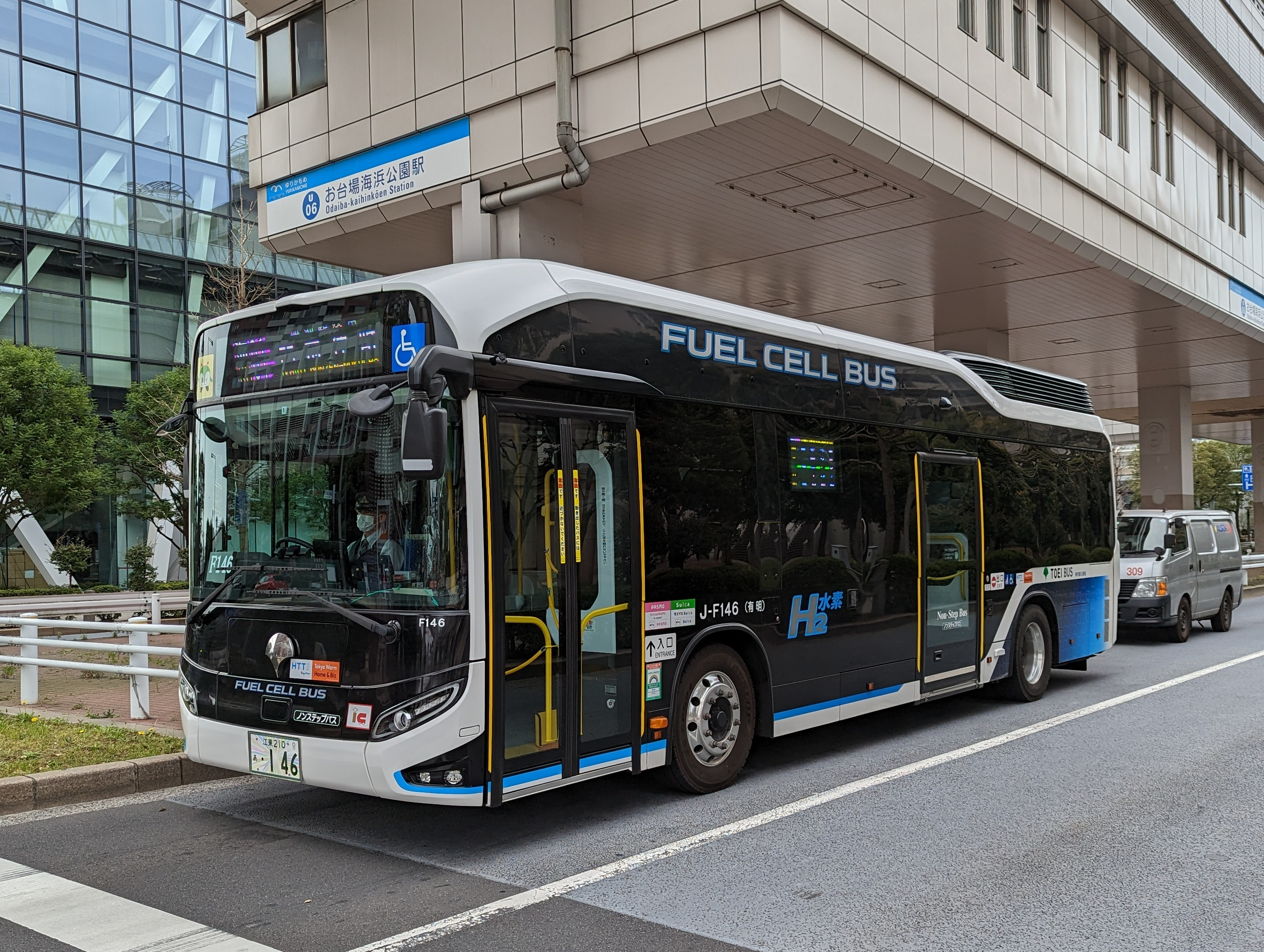
Toei Bus Toyota Sora in 2023

As of 2020, 5,648 hydrogen fuel cell buses are in use around the world, with 93.7% of them in China. Some early adopters of fuel cell buses have opted to focus on battery electric buses, with London having 950 battery electric buses, and 20 hydrogen fuel cell buses in their fleet as of 2023.

In 2015, Toyota began testing their updated hydrogen fuel cell bus in Tokyo, the Toyota FC Bus. Developed in conjunction with Hino Motors, it utilised technology from the Toyota Mirai hydrogen fuel cell car, as well as from Hino's hybrid buses. In 2017, Toyota unveiled the Toyota Sora bus, with production beginning in March 2018. By 2020, over 100 Toyota Sora buses had been delivered, operating on the Tokyo BRT, JR Bus Kanto and Toei Bus.

In 2018, Toyota announced that they would be supplying their hydrogen fuel cell technology to Portuguese bus manufacturer Caetano, for buses to be sold in Europe. The Caetano H2.City Gold has achieved numerous sales, such in Bielefeld, Cottbus, and Barcelona. Caetano has subsequently begun to brand the bus as a "Toyota", after Toyota became a majority shareholder.

In China, the Feichi (Allenbus) company began manufacturing hydrogen fuel cell buses in Yunfu after licensing the fuel cell technology from Ballard. The hydrogen fuel cell is combined with a 36kWh Lithium-ion battery, which powers the electric motors. Over 300 Feichi buses are now in service in the city of Foshan in Guangdong province in China. Other manufacturers in China also began to produce hydrogen fuel cell buses. Zhongtong Bus began a research and development programme in 2014, and began producing buses in 2016.

In 2018, Zhangjiakou ordered 74 hydrogen fuel cell buses in preparation for the Beijing 2022 Winter Olympics. During the Games, over 800 hydrogen fuel cell buses and coaches were used from manufacturers Foton, Yutong, Geely and Zhongtong Bus. Hydrogen fuel cell vehicles were chosen over battery electric vehicles due to the cold weather prevalent in Hebei Province. The substantial use of hydrogen was criticised, given that much of China's hydrogen is "black hydrogen", produced by burning coal. This meant that each kilo of hydrogen produced around 15–20 kg of CO_{2.}

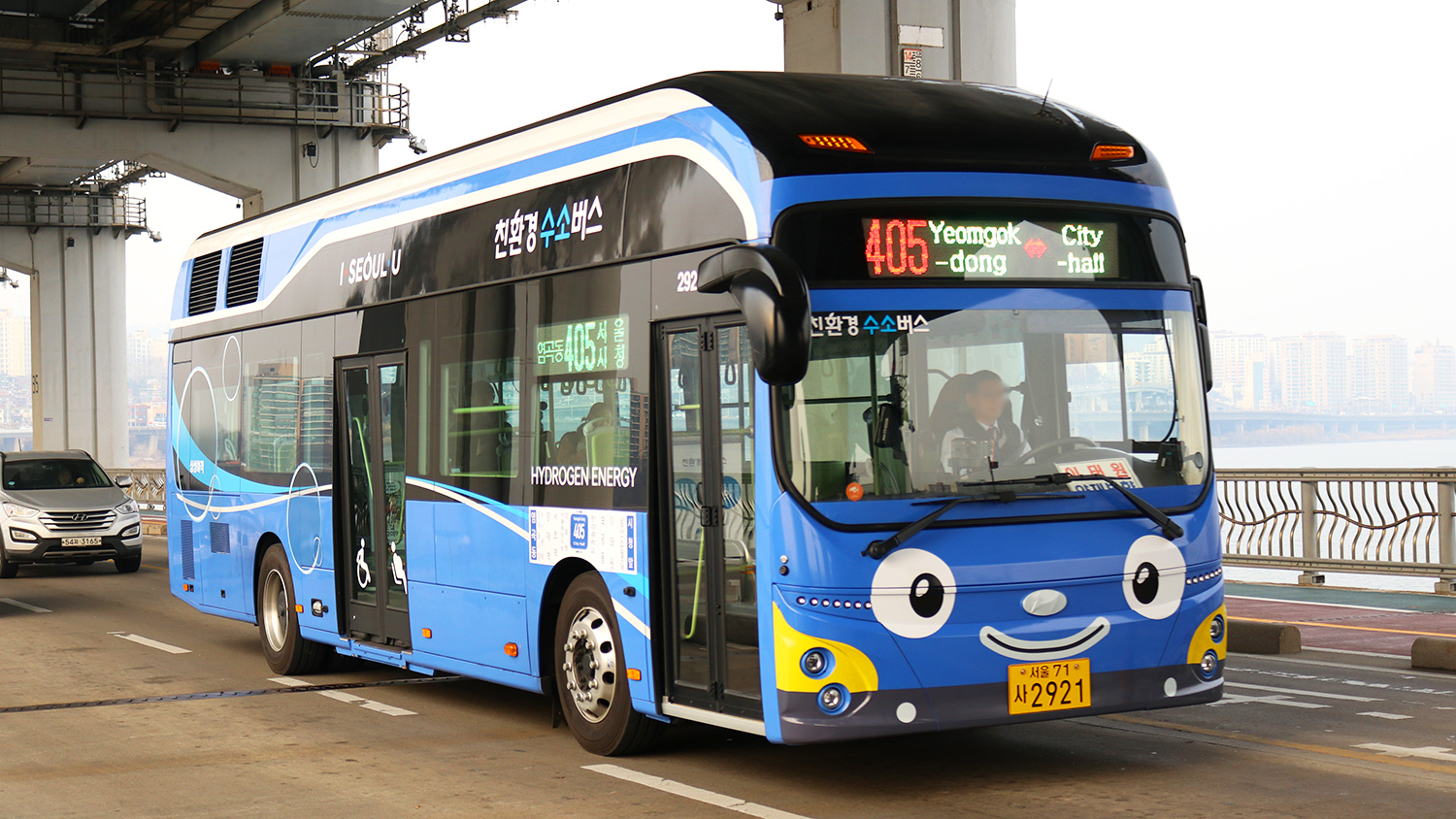
Hyundai Elec City FCEV in Seoul, South Korea in 2019

Launched in 2017, the Hyundai Elec City entered commercial service in South Korea in December 2019. By June 2021, 108 buses were in service across South Korea. Trial operations of the ElecCity with Wiener Linien in Vienna, Austria were planned from November 2021, with further tests in Germany also announced. The ElecCity has a range of over 500 kilometres (310 mi), and a maximum output of 180 kW. The cities of Busan and Ulsan announced in 2022 that they planned to introduce over 620 buses by 2025.

In 2019, Polish bus manufacturer Solaris Bus & Coach announced a hydrogen fuel cell bus on their popular Urbino 12 platform. This was subsequently tested by a range of major operators including RATP in Paris, and ordered by European bus operators including Connexxion, ÖBB Postbus, and MPK Poznań. In 2022, Solaris announced a hydrogen fuel cell version of their Urbino 18 articulated bus at InnoTrans 2022.

In 2020, the city of Nanning in China announced they planned to replace their entire 7,000 battery electric bus fleet with better performing hydrogen fuel cell/battery hybrid buses.

As of 2020, the NERL was continuing work to evaluate fuel cell bus projects in the U.S., with 64 buses in service in California, Hawaii and Ohio. AC Transit has the largest fleet of hydrogen fuel cell buses in the United States, with 22 buses in service from Van Hool and New Flyer. This will allow a direct comparison between battery electric and hydrogen fuel cell buses, to guide future purchasing decisions in light of a desire for a zero emission bus fleet. AC Transit noted that they had the "most comprehensive zero-emission bus (ZEB) program in the United States", and had run 3,200,000 miles (5,100,000 km) of service with zero emission buses since 2000.

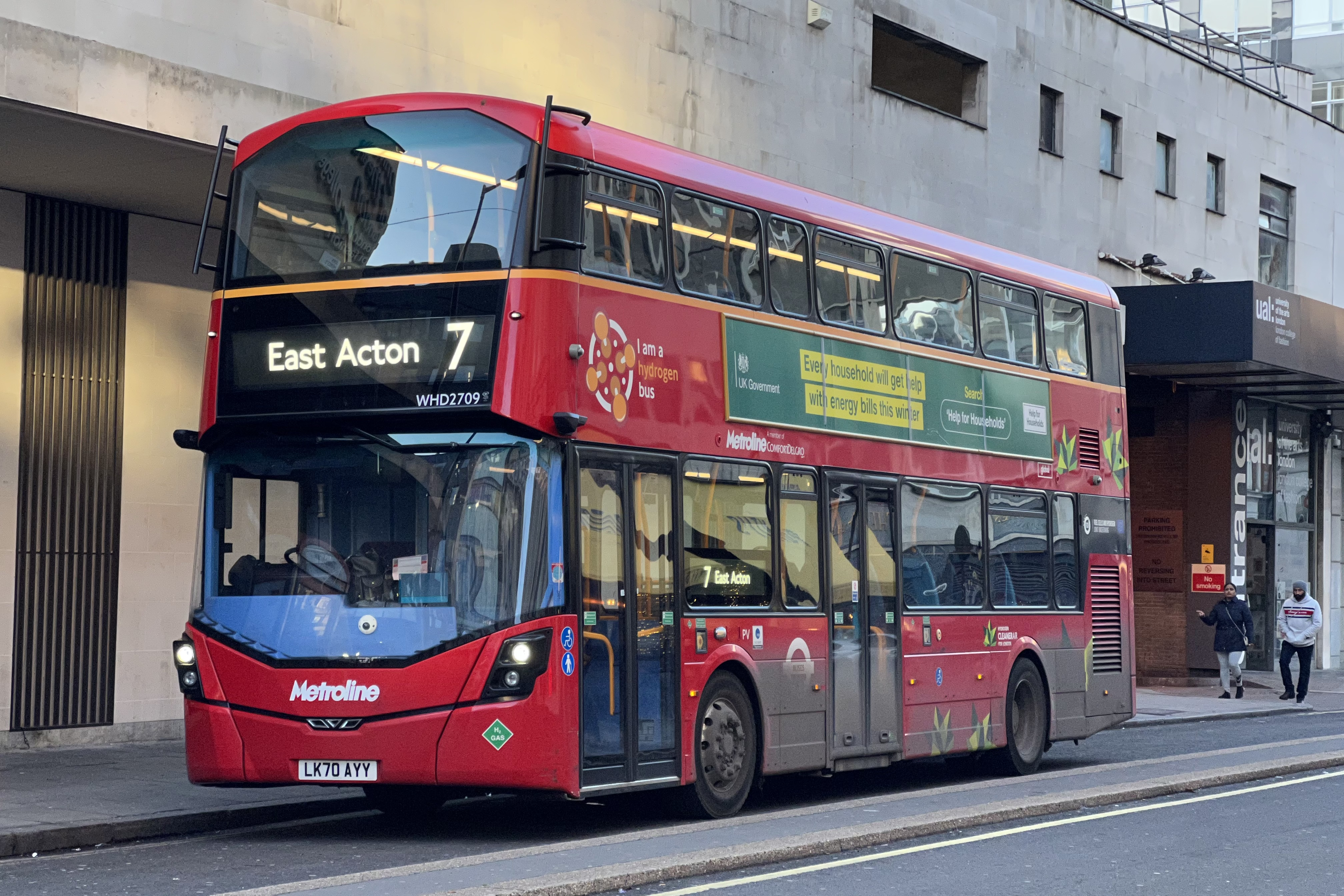
Wright StreetDeck Hydroliner FCEV bus in London, England in 2022

In June 2021, the world's first hydrogen fuel cell double-decker bus (Wright StreetDeck Hydroliner) entered service with Metroline in London on route 7. These buses also entered service in Aberdeen, Scotland. The Hydroliner FCEV was developed as part of the European Union 'Joint Initiative for Hydrogen Vehicles across Europe' (JIVE).

Other bus manufacturers continued to enter the hydrogen fuel cell market, with Iveco announcing a memorandum of understanding with Air Liquide to develop 'hydrogen mobility', and Alexander Dennis announcing a 'next generation' double decker bus. New manufacturers also planned to enter the market, such as Hyzon Motors. Other countries continued to investigate the potential of hydrogen fuel cell buses, with Moscow announcing a pilot of Kamaz buses in 2022.

In May 2022, Regionalverkehr Köln, the public transport operator for Cologne, Germany ordered up to 100 hydrogen fuel cell buses from Solaris and Wrightbus. This followed the announcement of the 'National Hydrogen Strategy' in Germany, which made clear that hydrogen fuel cell buses were a feasible alternative for long-distance routes. Mercedes-Benz announced that their popular eCitaro bus would be made available with a range extender using a Toyota hydrogen fuel cell. This would increase the range of the bus to 400 kilometres (250 mi).

In July 2022, Île-de-France Mobilités (IDFM) ordered 47 fuel cell buses for the Grand Paris region in France at a cost of €48m. Green hydrogen will be used, with the hydrogen produced at an incinerator in Creteil. The managing director of IDFM stated that they wished to send a signal with their first order that bus manufacturers should "improve the technology, bring it to maturity, produce it [commercially] and we will be there".

In July 2022, over five hundred Foton AUV buses joined the Beijing Public Transport Group. Media reported that the buses have a range of around 600 km, and can be refilled in around 10 to 15 minutes. These buses had previously been used at the Beijing 2022 Winter Olympics.

In August 2022, India's first domestically developed hydrogen fuel bus was unveiled in Pune. The bus was developed by KPIT Technologies and the Council of Scientific and Industrial Research.

In 2022, New York City's MTA announced that they would trial hydrogen fuel cell buses, funded by a grant from New York State Energy Research and Development Authority. The first two buses (New Flyer Xcelsior CHARGE H2) will be launched in The Bronx by late 2024. The MTA announced that its entire bus fleet will be zero-emission by 2040.

In 2023, issues regarding the cost of hydrogen compared to electricity led to several transit agencies cancelling their orders. However other agencies continued to order fuel cell buses – with TPER in Bologna ordering 130 buses from Solaris, Seoul ordering 1,300 buses from Hyundai and SamTrans ordering 108 buses from New Flyer. In October 2023, Santa Cruz Metro in Santa Cruz, California ordered 57 fuel cell buses at a cost of $87 million, after tests showed that fully loaded battery electric buses were not suited to the hilly roads of the area.

A 2023 research paper estimated that just 4% of zero emission vehicles will be hydrogen fuel cell powered by 2044, with a "low penetration of fuel cell city buses" located only in countries with hydrogen infrastructure and on bus routes where it is unfeasible for battery electric buses to operate. The paper also noted potential for intercity coaches and buses to be powered by hydrogen fuel cells. Other reports indicated growth in fuel cell buses, with Solaris indicating that they had over 500 buses on order, with a 44% market share for fuel cell buses in Europe.

In January 2024, Barcelona's TMB ordered 38 hydrogen fuel cell buses from Solaris at a cost of €23.4 million, with green hydrogen produced by Iberdrola in the Zona Franca area of the city. In April 2024, US manufacturer Gillig announced that they would introduce a hydrogen fuel cell bus by 2026, with a powertrain from BAE Systems and fuel cells from Ballard Power Systems.

== Comparison with battery electric buses ==
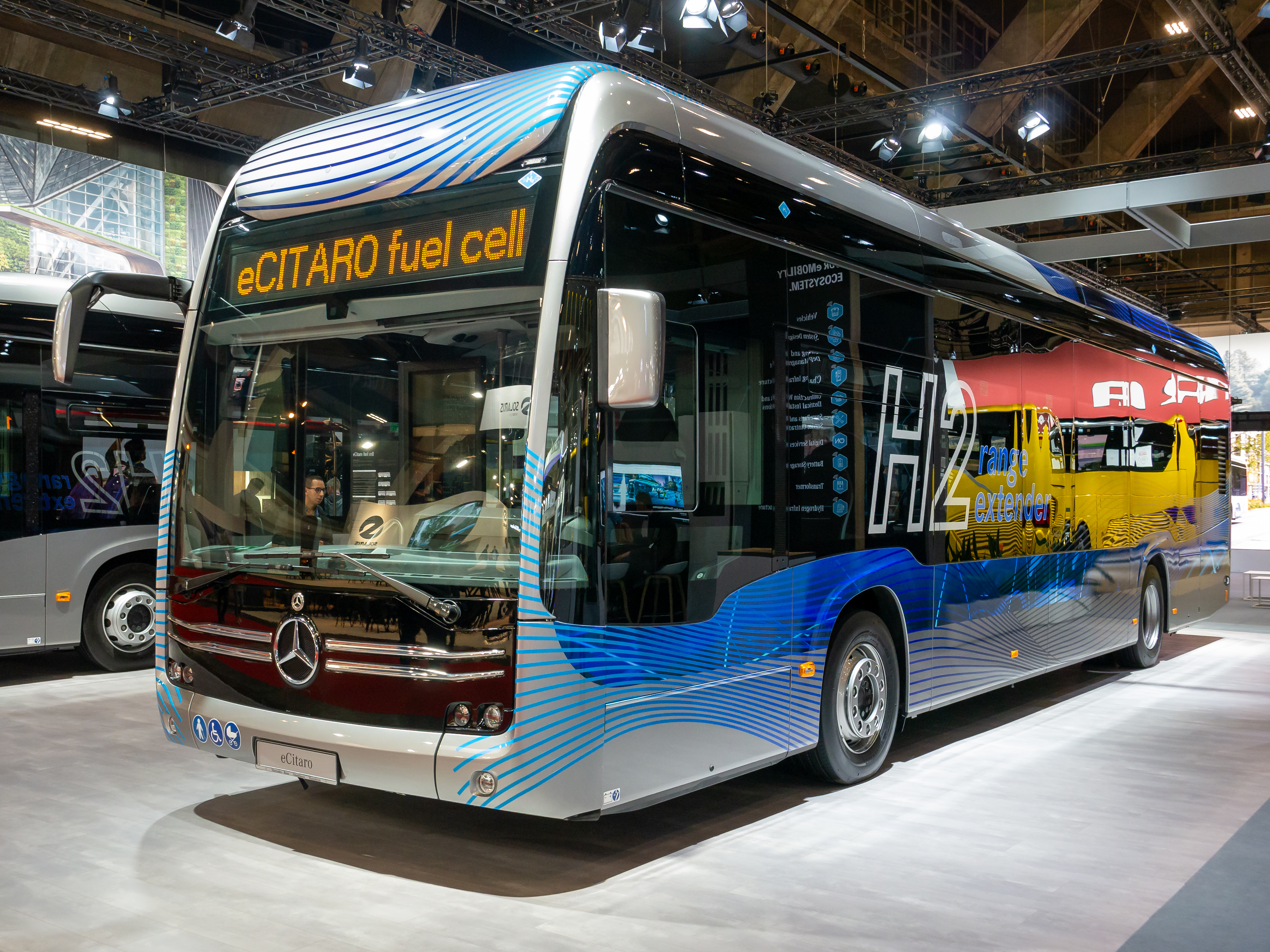
Mercedes-Benz eCitaro, a battery electric bus with a hydrogen fuel cell range extender

Buses powered by hydrogen fuel cells have some similarities with battery electric buses, as well as key differences.

Both types are zero-emission at the tailpipe, with hydrogen fuel cell buses producing water. However many sources of hydrogen, including those most commonly used, are not zero-emission. Both are propelled by electric motors, and both have been produced by a range of bus manufacturers. Both have upfront costs – such as electric chargers, or a hydrogen fuelling station.

Unlike battery electric buses, hydrogen fuel cell buses can be refuelled in around 10 minutes, compared to an overnight charge for electric buses (or an energy intensive, high current fast charge of a battery). Hydrogen fuel cell buses have a greater range and longer run time than battery electric buses, with a range of around 450 kilometres (280 mi) before refuelling – compared to around 250 kilometres (160 mi) between charges for a battery electric bus. Hydrogen also has a higher energy storage density than batteries. Furthermore, as batteries are made larger to increase range – they become heavier, decreasing energy efficiency. Hydrogen fuel cell buses therefore weigh less than battery electric buses – up to 11,000 pounds (5,000 kg) lighter.

Hydrogen fuel cell buses are less affected by temperature, with consistent power and range at extreme hot or cold temperatures. Operators of battery electric buses have reported shorter range in low temperatures, with Berliner Verkehrsbetriebe (BVG) reporting a 30% shorter range in cold weather (around −10 °C (14 °F)).

Battery electric buses are more efficient than hydrogen fuel cell buses on an energy basis, owing to the relative inefficiency of a hydrogen fuel cell compared to a battery.

The cost of fuelling hydrogen buses is higher than battery buses. Costs of both battery electric buses and hydrogen fuel cell buses has fallen over time.

=== Range extender ===
Some manufacturers have used hydrogen fuel cells as a range extender for battery electric buses, allowing them to have greater range. For example, the Mercedes-Benz eCitaro has a range of 280 kilometres (170 mi) as a battery electric model, with the eCitaro fuel cell bus having a range of 400 kilometres (250 mi) thanks to a 60 kW Toyota fuel cell that recharges the battery.

== Costs ==
As of 2023, research shows that hydrogen fuel cell buses are more expensive to operate than battery electric buses, owing to the higher cost of the vehicles and the hydrogen fuel used, as well as the inefficiency of using a hydrogen fuel cell compared to a battery.

=== Hydrogen fuel ===
The cost of fuelling buses has varied substantially, due to the cost and availability of hydrogen. Some transit operators have been able to use hydrogen by-product from industrial processes (such as the production of Polyvinyl chloride) to lower the cost. Other transit operators have built small scale plants to produce hydrogen from natural gas (brown hydrogen), or have purchased it directly from industrial producers. Campaigners have criticised the use of brown hydrogen to power the buses, in light of the carbon footprint created by the industrial process. Green hydrogen – hydrogen produced using renewable energy – is generally considered to be too expensive.

In 2006, the National Renewable Energy Laboratory stated that the cost of hydrogen fuel was around $9 a kilogram, roughly comparing it to $2 a gallon for diesel. It further noted that the total cost per mile (including maintenance) was around $1 per mile for diesel and around $6.50 per mile for hydrogen. In Europe, the Clean Urban Transport for Europe (CUTE) project in the early 2000s reported fuelling costs around 10 times more than diesel.

In 2021, Tokyu Bus reported that the cost of fuelling a hydrogen fuel cell bus is around 2.6 times higher than an equivalent diesel bus, with brown hydrogen predominately used in Japan. In January 2022, the city of Montpellier, France, cancelled a contract to procure 51 buses powered by hydrogen fuel cells, when it found that the cost of operation was 6 times more expensive than electric buses. The city ordered battery electric buses instead.

In 2021, Wuppertaler Stadtwerke reported that their hydrogen fuel cell buses cost around the same as their diesel buses to operate. London reported that the cost of hydrogen was around £6 per kilogram in 2023, roughly comparable with the cost of diesel fuel. Santa Cruz noted in 2023 that hydrogen cost around $9 to $13 a gallon (compared to around $6 a gallon for diesel fuel), however they noted that fuel cell buses get "more than twice as much mileage out of a gallon-equivalent of hydrogen as a gallon of diesel", making direct comparisons between the two fuels challenging.

Projections from the Hydrogen Council are that hydrogen produced from renewable energy at scale could cost around $1.4 to $2.3 per kilogram.

=== Vehicles ===
Costs of fuel cell buses has gradually fallen as technology has become more widespread and commercially viable.

In 2007, the National Renewable Energy Laboratory stated that the purchase price of a hydrogen fuel cell bus was around $2–3m, a standard diesel bus was around $330,000 and a hybrid bus was around $480,000. Regionalverkehr Köln in Cologne, Germany reported that the Phileas bus cost them €1.86 million to purchase in 2011, a Van Hool A330 cost around €850,000 to purchase in 2014 and €590,000 to purchase in 2020, and that prices had fallen further – with new hydrogen fuel cell buses costing around €500,000 in 2023.

In 2022, the Financial Times reported that the Japanese Toyota FC Sora cost ¥100 million (€710,000) for a six-year lease, whereas a diesel bus costs around ¥24 million (€170,000). Local authorities have subsidised the cost of the buses to get them into service. In South Korea, the government subsidises the purchase of ₩700 million (€470,000) Hyundai ElecCity buses by ₩300 million (€200,000), protecting domestic industry from Chinese built battery electric buses.

In the United States, it was reported in 2022 that a hydrogen bus cost around $1.2 million to purchase, compared to $750,000 for a battery electric bus. The Globe and Mail noted that European produced fuel cell buses are cheaper as they are produced in larger quantities.

Research groups such as H2Bus Consortium are working to lower the cost of hydrogen fuel cell buses to the level of diesel buses, with volume orders and mass production allowing manufacturers to take advantage of economies of scale.

=== Other costs ===
When compared to diesel buses, transit operators face additional upfront costs when moving to hydrogen fuel cell buses. This includes constructing hydrogen fuelling stations, as well as purchasing spare parts for new buses. Battery electric buses have similar upfront costs, requiring the installation of electric chargers and upgrades to the electrical grid to handle large numbers of electric buses being charged (often overnight).

== Vehicles ==
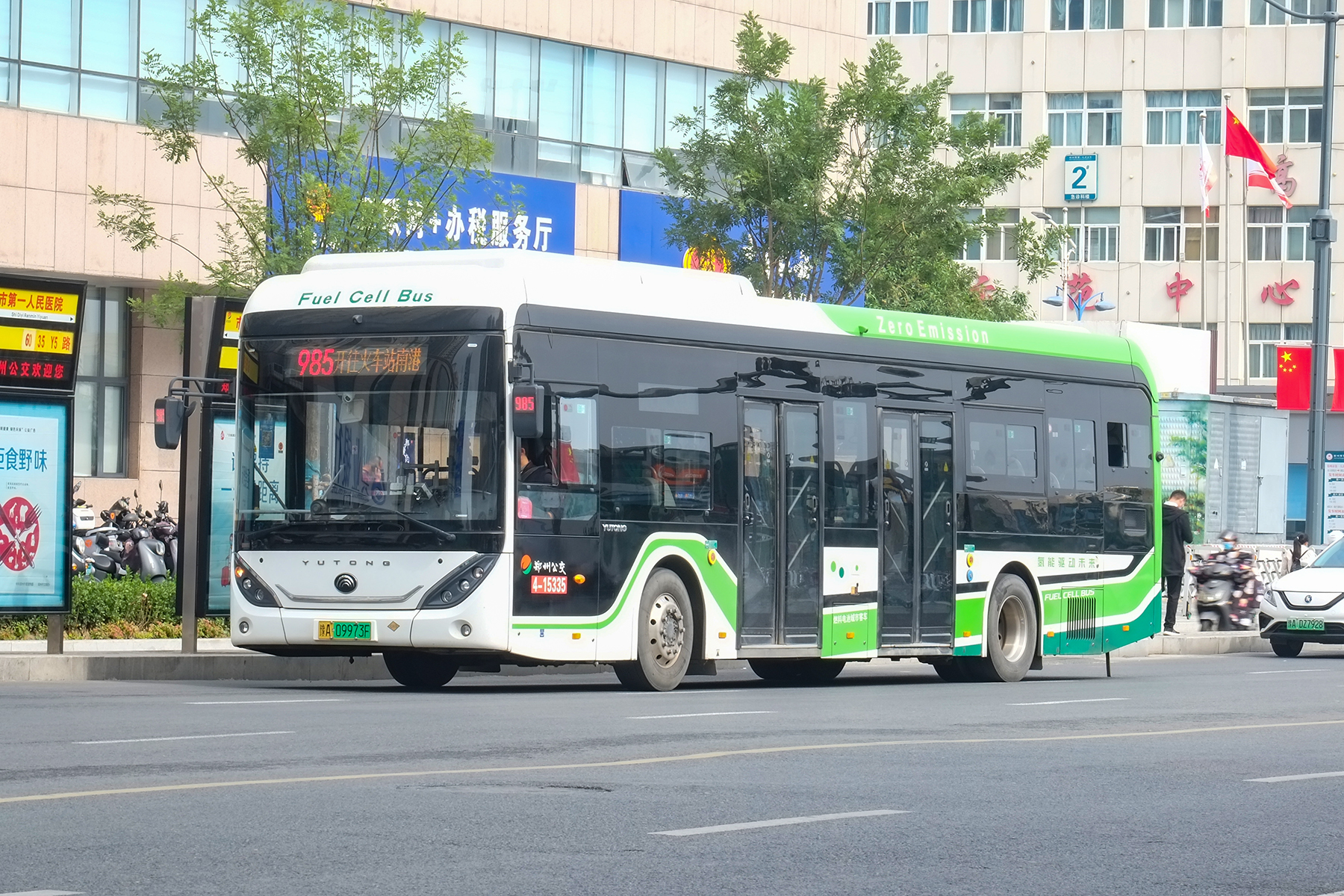
Yutong F12 in Zhengzhou, China in 2022

As of 2020, 5,648 hydrogen fuel cell buses are in use around the world, with 93.7% of them in China.

A wide variety of companies are currently producing hydrogen fuel cell buses. Bus manufacturers usually work with a provider of hydrogen fuel cells to power the bus, such as Ballard Power Systems or Toyota.

Vehicles include, but are not limited to:

- New Flyer Xcelsior CHARGE FC
- Toyota Sora FC
- Wright StreetDeck Hydroliner FCEV
- Solaris Urbino
- Hyundai Elec City FCEV
- Hyundai Universe FCEV
- Caetano H2.City Gold
- Foton AUV
- Yutong F12
- Van Hool A330 FC
- Mercedes-Benz eCitaro REX
- Zhongtong LCK6126FCEVG
- Skywell NJ6106FCEV
- ElDorado Axess-FC
- Sunwin iFCV10

== See also ==
- Fuel cell vehicle
- List of fuel cell vehicles
- List of buses
