= Spirit House =

Spirit House may refer to:

- Spirit house, a miniature house for spirits in Southeast Asia
- Spirit house (Dakelh), a ritual structure among the Dakelh of British Columbia, Canada
- Spirit house (Ojibwe), a structure erected on Ojibwe graves
- Spirit House (Georgetown, New York), a historic house in Georgetown, New York, US
- Spirit House (album), an album by Jemeel Moondoc
- The Spirit House, a 1993 young-adult novel by William Sleator
- Spirit House, a 2011 book by Mark Dapin
- Spirit House, the music video for the 2017 Gorillaz song "Saturnz Barz"
