= Staircase (disambiguation) =

A staircase, or stairs, is a structure used to bridge a vertical distance.

Staircase may also refer to:

== Music ==
- Staircase (album), by Keith Jarrett, 1977
- "The Staircase (Mystery)", a song by Siouxsie and the Banshees, 1979
- "The Daily Mail" / "Staircase", a single by Radiohead, 2011
- "Staircase", a song by Roni Size & Reprazent from In the Møde, 2000

== Theater, film, and television ==
- Staircase (play), a 1968 play by Charles Dyer
- Staircase (film), a 1969 British film adaptation of the play
- The Staircase (1950 film), a West German drama film
- The Staircase (1998 film), an American television film
- The Staircase (French miniseries), a 2004 French true-crime TV miniseries documenting the murder trial of Michael Peterson
- The Staircase (American miniseries), a 2022 American streaming miniseries adaptation of the French series

== Places ==
- Staircase Falls, a series of waterfalls in Yosemite National Park, California, US
- Staircase Glacier, Antarctica
- Staircase Peak, or Skyang Kangri, a mountain on the China-Pakistan border

== Other uses ==
- The Staircase (novel), a 2000 novel by Ann Rinaldi
- Staircase House, a medieval building in Stockport, Greater Manchester, England
- The shape of a mathematical function or model; see, e.g., staircase function and staircase number
- A type of student accommodation around Oxbridge university quadrangles; see, e.g., Tom Quad#Description
- "Hudson Yards Staircase", a name once used for Vessel (structure)

== See also ==
- Stair (disambiguation)
- Staircasing (disambiguation)
- Stairway (disambiguation)
- Step (disambiguation)
