= Stupp =

Stupp is a surname of German origin, with several possible meanings. Notable people with the surname include:

- Abraham Stupp (1897-1968), Israeli politician
- Dagmar Stupp, German former canoeist
- Dann Stupp (born 1978), American sports editor and author
- Howard Stupp (born 1955), Canadian former wrestler
- Samuel I. Stupp (born 1951), Costa Rican chemist and professor

== See also ==
- Stupp–Oxenrider Farm, a historic farm complex in Pennsylvania
- Stepp
