= Stairway (disambiguation) =

Stairway can refer to the following:

- A staircase, i.e. stairs
- Stairway (band), a 1977-1980 British band formed by former members of the band Renaissance
- Stairways (album), 1997 album by Nick Gilder
- Stairway to Heaven, a song by Led Zeppelin, commonly referred to simply as "Stairway"

== See also ==
- Staircase (disambiguation)
- Stair (disambiguation)
- Step (disambiguation)
