= Parasite Pig =

Novel by William Sleator

- Author: William Sleator
- Language: English
- Series: Interstellar Pig series
- Genre: Science fiction
- Publication date: 2002
- Publication place: United States
- Media type: Print (Hardback & e-book)
- Preceded by: Interstellar Pig

Parasite Pig is a young adult science fiction novel written by William Sleator. It is the sequel to the 1984 book Interstellar Pig.

== Plot ==
Parasite Pig follows the character of Barney, who has been working part-time at an after-school job in order to pay for the repairs for his house. The aliens still have plans for Barney and he must deal with talking parasites, giant crustaceans, and a wasp woman.

== Reception ==
Critical reception for Parasite Pig has been mostly positive. Booklist and Kirkus Reviews praised the book, with Kirkus saying that the book's secondary characters gave the book a freshness and "keeps it from being merely a sequel". The Horn Book Magazine also reviewed the book, praising the book's aliens as "well developed". The Washington Post reviewed the book, stating that "The dialogue is deficient, the characterization right out of "Scooby Doo," the budding romance inane. What propels it, or not, is its ideas."
