= William Sleator =

American science fiction author

- Born: February 13, 1945; Havre de Grace, Maryland, U.S.
- Died: August 3, 2011 (aged 66); Bua Chet, Thailand
- Education: Harvard University
- Occupations: Novelist; young-adult writer; children's writer
- Writing career
- Period: 1970–2011
- Genre: Science fiction

William Warner Sleator III (February 13, 1945 – August 3, 2011) was an American science fiction author who wrote primarily young adult novels but also wrote for younger readers. His books typically deal with adolescents coming across a peculiar phenomenon related to an element of theoretical science, then trying to deal with the situation. The theme of family relationships, especially between siblings, is frequently intertwined with the science fiction plotline.

Due to the suspenseful and often eerie nature of some of his works, Sleator has been compared to young-adult horror writer R. L. Stine (who has identified himself as a fan of Sleator's work). Others cite a strong resemblance to the paranoid, dream-like style of Franz Kafka, which is most notable in House of Stairs, one of Sleator's more popular novels.

== Biography ==
=== Early life, family and education ===
Sleator, the oldest of four siblings, was born in Havre de Grace, Maryland, to William Warner Sleator Jr., a professor of physiology and biophysics, and Esther Kaplan Sleator, a pediatrician who did pioneering research on attention deficit disorder (ADD). The Sleator family moved to University City, Missouri, a suburb of St. Louis, when Billy (as the family called him) was three. His younger siblings are Vicky Wald, Tycho (Associate Professor of Physics at NYU), and Daniel (Professor of Computer Science at CMU). He attended University City High School, where he was known as a composer who wrote scores for school plays and the orchestra. He graduated in 1963.

He graduated from Harvard University with a degree in English in 1967.

=== Career ===
After college, Sleator moved to England, earning money by playing music in ballet schools. Eventually, Sleator returned to the United States to write his first novel, Blackbriar, eventually published in 1972, which was based on real life experiences. His first published book was a children's story called The Angry Moon, released in 1970. It won a Caldecott Honor citation.

Sleator's writing style has been described as clean and simple. His characters are reluctant teenage heroes, and Sleator's younger siblings and friends have often found themselves being written into his prose, as in the semi-autobiographical story collection Oddballs.

Unlike the 'Golden Age' science fiction future-oriented model (one of Buck Rogers tomorrowlands), Sleator's work often includes a morbid or negative fixation on the past or includes visions of dystopian or alternate worlds (future or otherwise) in which something has gone wrong. For example, Sleator's The Green Futures of Tycho takes place in the past in addition to the future; the world outside his House of Stairs is hinted to be dystopic; Interstellar Pig draws upon the supposed insanity of a long-dead prisoner.

Elements of Thai culture also occasionally turn up in his stories. His 2009 short story "Fingernail" appears in the anthology How Beautiful the Ordinary: Twelve Stories of Identity and is from a young gay Thai man's perspective.

=== Personal life ===
Sleator struggled with alcoholism.

He split his time between homes in Boston, Massachusetts, and a small village in rural Thailand. His partner Paul Peter Rhode died in 1999, and his companion Siang Chitsa-Ard died in 2008. Sleator himself died on August 3, 2011, in Bua Chet, Thailand.

== Works ==
- The Angry Moon (1970)
- Blackbriar (1972)
- Run (1973)
- House of Stairs (1974)
- Among the Dolls (1975)
- Into the Dream (1979)
- Once, Said Darlene (1979)
- The Green Futures of Tycho (1981)
- That's Silly (1981)
- Fingers (1983)
- Interstellar Pig (1984)
- Singularity (1985)
- The Boy Who Reversed Himself (1986)
- The Duplicate (1988)
- Strange Attractors (1989)
- The Spirit House (1991)
- Others See Us (1993)
- Oddballs (1993) (story collection)
- The Elevator (1993) (story collection)
- Dangerous Wishes (1995)
- The Night the Heads Came (1996)
- The Beasties (1997)
- The Boxes (1998)
- Rewind (1999)
- Boltzmon! (1999)
- Unbalanced (2000) (short story)
- Marco's Millions (2001)
- Parasite Pig (2002)
- The Boy Who Couldn't Die (2004)
- The Last Universe (2005)
- Hell Phone (2006)
- Test (2008)
- The Phantom Limb (2011)
