= Blackbriar (novel) =

1972 young adult novel by William Sleator

- Author: William Sleator
- Language: English
- Publication date: 1972
- Publication place: United States
- Media type: Print

Blackbriar is a 1972 supernatural young adult coming-of-age novel by William Sleator and was Sleator's first young adult novel. The book has been translated into German as Das Geisterhaus and into Danish as Det forheksede hus.

== Plot ==
Blackbriar follows the character of Danny as he attempts to uncover the mysteries of his new home. Formerly abandoned, the local residents refuse to speak about the old cottage of Blackbriar. As Danny dreams of witches, fire, and maniacal laughter, he begins to discover that strange dreams might be the least of his worries.

== Reception ==
Critical reception for Blackbriar has been mixed to positive, with Kirkus Reviews calling it "perfectly eerie" and Teacher Magazine praising the writing as "skillful". In a 1972 review, Publishers Weekly wrote that "neither the characterization nor the plot is entirely convincing." The Horn Book Review also reviewed the book, stating "the story is mysterious and suspenseful, and its effectiveness lies in Sleator's characterizations and narrative skill".
