= Singularity (Sleator novel) =

1985 novel by William Sleator

- Cover of the 1995 Puffin (Puffin Books) paperback edition
- Author: William Sleator
- Cover artist: Broeck Steadman
- Language: English
- Genre: Science fiction
- Publisher: Puffin
- Publication date: 1985
- Publication place: United States
- Media type: Print (Hardcover & paperback)
- ISBN: 978-0-14-037598-5
- OCLC: 33485250

Singularity, published in 1985 by E. P. Dutton, is a science fiction novel for young adults written by William Sleator. It was listed as a YALSA Best Book for Young Adults, a Junior Library Guild Selection, and was a Colorado Blue Spruce Young Adult Book Award Nominee.

== Plot introduction ==
Sixteen-year-old identical twins Harry and Barry learn that their mysterious great-uncle has died, and his house and possessions now belong to their mother. The brothers travel to Sushan, Illinois, to examine the house and its contents. Inside the cobweb-filled home, the rival brothers find mysterious animal skeletons and other odd objects. Outside Uncle Ambrose's residence, Harry and Barry find a small metal-reinforced building, which according to the accompanying keys, is called the "playhouse." When the twins explore the playhouse, they discover that the properties of time are altered inside, and the playhouse may explain the eccentricities of their great-uncle. When their quirky and cute neighbor Lucy enters their lives, competition between the twins escalates, and Harry makes a decision that will change the nature of their relationship forever.

== Reception ==
- In his review of Singularity, Orson Scott Card, bestselling author of The Ender Saga, wrote "Singularity... is a masterpiece... I can't recommend this novel highly enough—it's on my list of best all-time works of science fiction."
