= Toyota FC Bus =

Electric/hydrogen transit bus

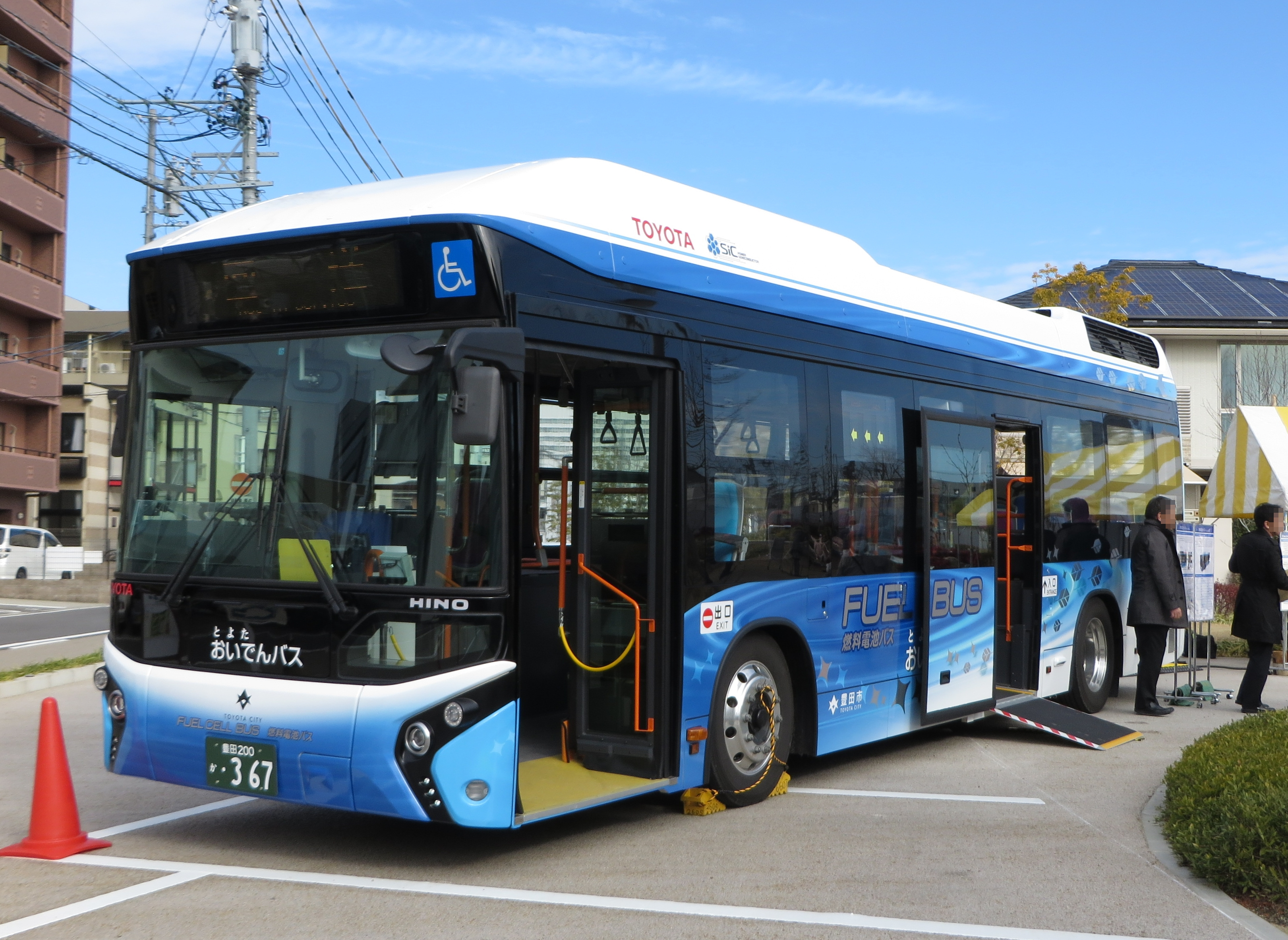

Overview
- Manufacturer: Toyota
- Production: 2017-Present

Body and chassis
- Class: Transit bus
- Body style: Single-decker bus

Powertrain
- Engine: Fuel-cell
- Electric motor: 2x AC synchronous drive motors 114 kW (153 hp; 155 PS)
- Transmission: 1-speed
- Battery: 235 kWh NiMH battery

Dimensions
- Length: 10,525 mm (414.4 in)
- Width: 2,490 mm (98.0 in)
- Height: 3,340 mm (131.5 in)

The Toyota FC Bus is a transit bus with an electric motor powered by hydrogen fuel cells produced by Toyota, developed in cooperation with Hino Motors. The bus uses components originally developed for the Toyota Mirai, a mid-size fuel cell sedan.

Hydrogen fuel cells generate electricity by reacting hydrogen and oxygen in the presence of a catalyst, the by-product of which is water. Hydrogen is stored in carbon and glass fiber tanks and oxygen is taken from the air.

The FC Bus is equipped with a power supply system for external receivers with a maximum power of 9 kW, which provides a maximum of 235 kWh of energy. Fuel cells are the source of energy. The purpose of this installation was to put an emergency power source for use in the city in the event of a natural disaster, such as an earthquake or tsunami.

The bus was replaced by the Toyota Sora in 2018.

== History ==
Japan's first hydrogen fuel cell bus - the Toyota FCHV-BUS - was demonstrated in the early 2000s, and was used during Expo 2005.

In July 2015, Toyota tested a prototype fuel cell bus on bus routes in Tokyo. The prototype was developed in cooperation with Hino Motors, on the basis of the Hino hybrid bus and the Toyota Mirai fuel cell system. The bus was also lent to Meitetsu Bus for free, as a demonstration that fuel cell buses were practical.

In February 2017, Toyota began selling the FC Bus. The first copy was purchased by the Tokyo Metropolitan Government's Transport Office and was included in the Tokyo city bus network in March 2017. By 2020, Toyota supplied the Tokyo authorities with more than 100 Toyota FC Bus buses. This is part of the plan to promote the automotive industry using fuel cells at the Tokyo Olympic and Paralympic Games in 2020.

== See also ==
- List of Toyota vehicles
