= The Green Futures of Tycho =

1981 novel by William Sleator

- First edition
- Author: William Sleator
- Cover artist: James Nazz
- Language: English
- Genre: Young adult, Science fiction novel
- Published: 1981 (E. P. Dutton)
- Publication place: United States
- Media type: Print (Hardback & Paperback)
- Pages: 133
- ISBN: 0-525-31007-X

The Green Futures of Tycho is a 1981 science fiction novel for young audiences by William Sleator. The book explores time travel and the consequences of Tycho's choices.

== Plot summary ==
The main character is Tycho Tithonus, an 11-year-old boy. Each child in his family is named after a famous artist or scientist and their parents expect them to live up to their names. Tycho himself is named after Sleator's younger brother, who in turn, was named after Tycho Brahe, the Danish astronomer. Tycho Tithonus finds a silver egg time machine that gives him the ability to travel into the past and the future. He uses this ability to bother his siblings. While visiting the future times Tycho realises that the silver egg will be changing its appearance. The egg will glow more and more. Tycho also sees himself being transformed over time to be rather evil. When Tycho visits the terrible future and sees where his actions will lead to, he risks his life to save his family by destroying the egg.

== Further Information ==
The Green Futures of Tycho was one source of inspiration for the Interactive Fiction work Shrapnel by Adam Cadre.
