= Marco's Millions =

2001 novel by William Sleator

- Author: William Sleator
- Language: English
- Genre: Science fiction
- Publisher: Dutton Juvenile
- Publication date: June 4, 2001
- Media type: Print (Hardcover & Paperback)
- Pages: 161pp
- ISBN: 978-0-525-46441-9
- OCLC: 45661814
- LC Class: PZ7.S6313 Mar 2001
- Followed by: The Boxes

Marco's Millions (2001) is a science fiction novel by William Sleator. It is a prequel to the main book, The Boxes.

== Plot ==
The protagonist is a boy named Marco who likes to travel. He often secretly rides buses far from home, though only his telepathic sister finds out. One day, his sister sees strange lights in the basement, and she and Marco investigate. They find a portal into another dimension, and thus the adventure begins. Marco finds strange insect-like creatures there, who are convinced that Marco/Lilly can save their dimension (and as a result save Earth) from their god, which is a naked singularity. None of their family members know about this portal, so Lily and Marco secretly need to save this dimension. Time is valued differently than on Earth in that universe, as 1 minute on the other dimension is roughly 21 minutes on Earth. Saving the other dimension would mean being missing for several days on Earth. So, Marco tells his parents he going to his friend Nat's for vacation, while he'll actually be in the other dimension. The creatures (who communicate telepathically) tell Marco he must go on a giant swing and retrieve a small bag at the very top. This will be risking Marco's life. He retrieves the bag and brings it back to the ground. Next, he must go to the naked singularity and bribe it not to destroy the universe by giving it the bag's contents. The singularity values the contents very much and says it will not destroy the universe, but with one cost (continued in The Boxes).

== Reception ==
Roger Sutton in his review for Horn Book Magazine said "while the book has the far-out ideas and expert pace that Sleator's fans admire, there's an added dimension of poignancy in the character of Marco, both in his intense bond with his sister Lilly and in his restlessness: obsessed with travel even as a young child, intently riding buses and trains, he has, by the time he reappears as an adult in The Boxes, become something of an intergalactic Flying Dutchman." Diane Roback in her review for Publishers Weekly said that this novel was "more satisfying than its predecessor, and full of strange and startling details, this curious fantasy will spark readers' imaginations and send them right back to The Boxes for a glimpse of Marco's future." Trevelyn E. Jones in his review for School Library Journal said that "Marco is a substantial protagonist; the other characters, while less well-rounded, are convincing enough to advance the story. The book is a successful prequel to Sleator's The Boxes (Dutton, 1998), but also stands on its own."

== Sequel ==
The Boxes and Marco's Million's series was supposed to have a third book but was never made. In an email to a fan in 2006, he wrote the following:

"Some day I would like to write a third book in that series, called MAD MARTHA. Of course it is about Aunt Martha being mad at Marco for stealing her box.

But my editor says sequels never sell as well as the original. So I don't know when this will happen."

It is unknown if any of the book was written down at any time.
