= Staircasing =

Staircasing may refer to:

- Increasing one's share of a home in equity sharing
- "Jaggies" — jagged lines in computer graphics

== See also ==
- Staircase (disambiguation)
