= Stepping =

Stepping may refer to:

- Walking, one of the main gaits of locomotion among legged animals

== Computing ==
- Stepping level, an aspect of microprocessor version designation
- Stepping (debugging), a method of debugging

== Dance ==
- Chicago stepping, a type of dance originating in Chicago
- Step dance, generic term for dance styles where the footwork is the most important part of the dance
- Stepping (African-American), a percussive dance in which the participant's entire body is used as an instrument
- Steppin', album by the Pointer Sisters

== See also ==
- Step (disambiguation)
- Stepping stone (disambiguation)
- Mast Stepping
