= Rewind (novel) =

1999 novel by William Sleator

- First edition cover
- Author: William Sleator
- Genre: Science fiction
- Publisher: Dutton Children's Books
- Publication date: July 1, 1999
- ISBN: 978-0-525-46130-2

Rewind is a 1999 science fiction novel by American writer William Sleator that explores maturity and self-confidence.

== Plot summary ==
The main character is Peter, an 11-year-old boy. The stage is first set at his funeral, where he recalls that he was killed by his neighbor's car. Then he hears a mysterious voice. It tells Peter that he has a chance to go back to any moment before his death and alter the events, therefore preventing the catastrophe.

He attempts to save himself by putting sugar in the car that was destined to kill him. However, a different car hits him instead. Luckily, he is given another chance. He tries again by trying to impress his parents, preventing the quarrel that drove him out. Unfortunately, he dies yet again by a truck.

Against all odds he is given one last chance. This time, he changes his strategy. With his knowledge of the future, he manages to save himself. He goes back 4 weeks and starts to be nice to his parents. Eventually they start to like him. He always dies after doing his puppet show so when he does it this time the family likes it. He ends up living and the story lives happily ever after.

== Reception ==
Rewind received mixed reviews. Critic Don D'Ammassa called the book "entertaining but less original than Sleator's other novels." The novel was panned by Kirkus Reviews, who also called the premise unoriginal and wrote that the story's "internal logic seems more convenient than consistent."

Novelist Victoria Strauss praised the book's plot, characters, and "appealing message about maturity" for SFSite.

== Analysis ==
Alison Waller noted that the novel, though it is linear prose, is structured like a video game or work of hypertext with multiple endings, suggesting the many options adolescents are faced with when coming of age.
