= Stairs (surname) =

Stairs is an English surname. Notable people with the surname include:

- A. Edison Stairs (1924–2010), Canadian politician
- Denis Stairs (engineer) (1889–1980), Canadian engineer and businessman
- Denis Stairs (political scientist) (born 1939), Canadian science professor
- Ernest W. Stairs (1873–1941), Canadian politician
- Ingrid Stairs, Canadian astronomer
- Jess M. Stairs (born 1942), American politician
- John Fitzwilliam Stairs (1848–1904), Canadian businessman and politician
- Matt Stairs (born 1968), Canadian baseball player
- William Grant Stairs (1863–1892), Canadian-British explorer, leader of the Stairs Expedition
- William J. Stairs (born 1956), Canadian politician
- William Machin Stairs (1789–1865), Canadian merchant, banker, statesman

== See also ==
- Steers (surname)
