= Step =

Step(s) or STEP may refer to:

== Common meanings ==
- Steps, making a staircase
- Walking
- Dance move
- Military step, or march
  - Marching

== Arts ==
=== Films and television ===
- Steps (TV series), Hong Kong
- Step (film), US, 2017
- Steps (film), a 2026 American animated musical fantasy comedy film

=== Literature ===
- Steps (novel), by Jerzy Kosinski
- Systematic Training for Effective Parenting, a book series

=== Music ===
- Steps, a British pop group (1997–present)
- Step (Kara album), 2011, South Korea
  - "Step" (Kara song)
- Step (Meg album), 2007, Japan
- "Step" (Vampire Weekend song)
- "Step" (ClariS song)

=== Performing Arts ===
- Step dance

== Organizations ==
- STEP (company), Belgium
- Society of Trust and Estate Practitioners, international professional body for advisers who specialise in inheritance and succession planning
- Board on Science, Technology, and Economic Policy of the U.S. National Academies
- Solving the E-waste Problem, a UN organization

== Science, technology, and mathematics ==
- Step (software), a physics simulator in KDE
- Step function, in mathematics
- Striatal-enriched protein tyrosine phosphatase, an enzyme
- Serial transverse enteroplasty, a surgical procedure
- Spherical Tokamak for Energy Production, a UK nuclear fusion project
- STEP (satellite), to test general relativity
- STEP Library, a Bible software format
- ISO 10303 (STEP), a CAD data-exchange file format standard
- ISO 10303-21, a data exchange form of STEP
- Sustainable Transport Energy for Perth, a fuel cell bus program in Western Australia
- Staggered extension process, in molecular biology

== Places ==
=== Russia ===
- Step, Gostomlyansky Selsoviet, Medvensky District, Kursk Oblast, a khutor
- Step (air base), Chita, Russia
- Step (khutor), Lyubachansky Selsoviet, Medvensky District, Kursk Oblast, a khutor
- Step (selo), Lyubachansky Selsoviet, Medvensky District, Kursk Oblast, a selo

== Other uses ==
- Edward Step (1855–1931), nature writer
- Step (unit), a Roman unit of length
- Step aerobics
- Stepfamily, with a stepmother or stepfather
- STEP Bible, a Bible study tool
- STEPS, an acronym representing the principle testimonies in Quaker practical theology
- Sixth Term Examination Paper, UK
- Smart Traveler Enrollment Program, for US travelers
- Strategic Transfer of the Estate to the Private Sector, a 2001 contract of the UK Inland Revenue

== See also ==
- Stepping (disambiguation)
- Stepp
- Steppe
- Footstep (disambiguation)
