= Fuel Cell Bus Club =

The Fuel Cell Bus Club comprised the participants of three demonstration projects (CUTE, ECTOS and STEP) for fuel cell buses in nine European cities and two other worldwide cities between 2001 and 2007. The Fuel Cell Bus Club became a forum to share experiences and information between cities and researchers. Other cities such as Beijing also tested buses from the consortium behind the project.

All three projects used Mercedes-Benz Citaro buses, with hydrogen fuel cells from Ballard Power Systems. When completed in 2007, all three projects were deemed a success by researchers. However, the buses were criticised by some operators for their high cost of operation compared to diesel buses, with Madrid reporting that they were around ten times as costly to fuel. Others noted the high purchase price of hydrogen buses, and the need to build dedicated hydrogen filling stations.

== Projects ==
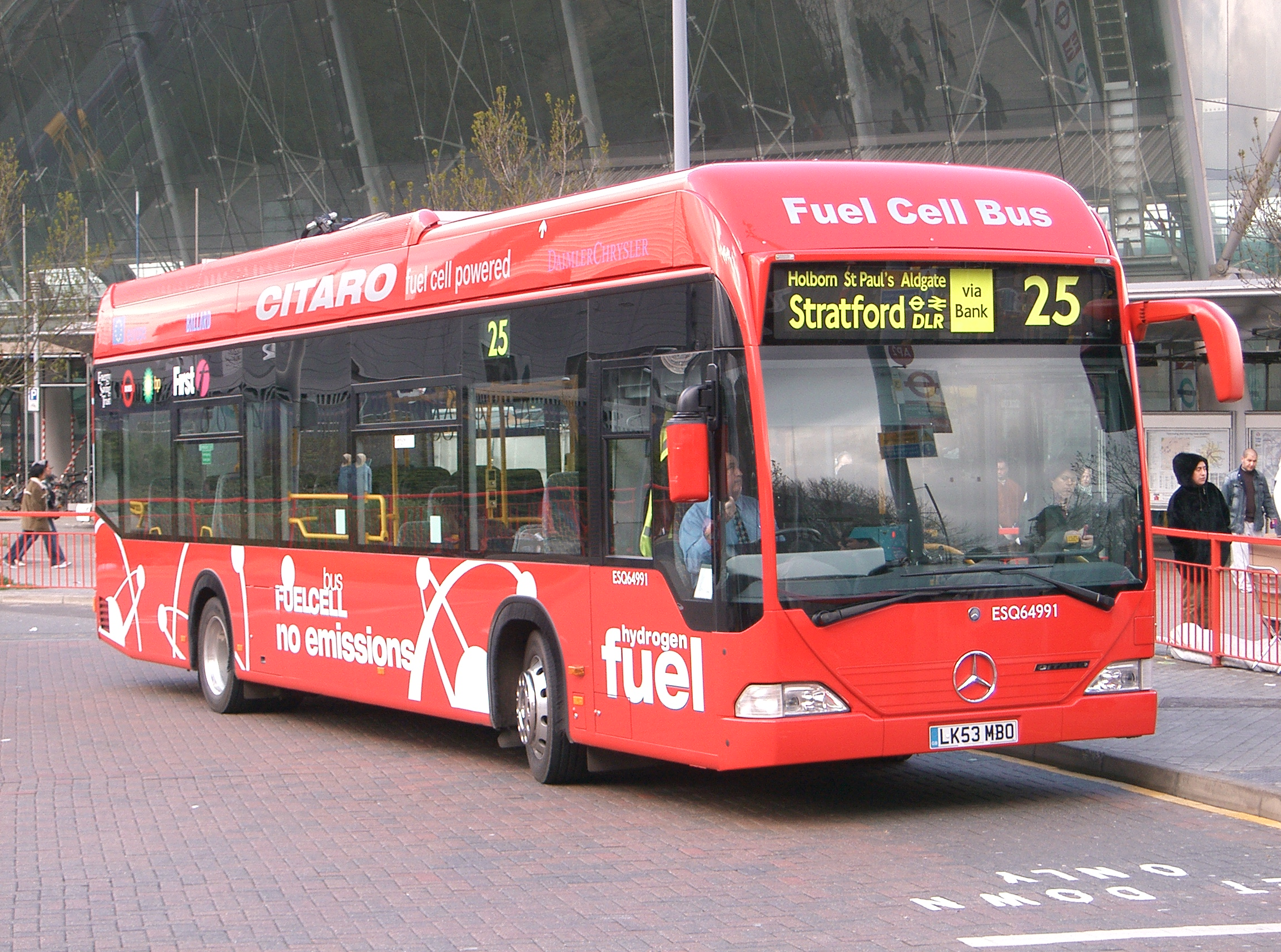
Hydrogen fuel cell powered Mercedes-Benz Citaro at Stratford, London in 2004

=== CUTE ===
From 2001, the European Union supported research project Clean Urban Transport for Europe (CUTE) began running hydrogen fuel cell powered buses in nine European cities - Amsterdam, Barcelona, Hamburg, London, Luxembourg, Madrid, Porto, Stockholm, and Stuttgart. The project was supported by a consortium of transportation operators, hydrogen infrastructure and fuel cell developers, universities and city authorities.

At the end of the project in 2006, researchers deemed the project a success. A subsequent project (HYFLEET-CUTE) ran from 2006 until 2009, using the existing hydrogen fuel cell buses as well as new buses.

=== ECTOS ===
ECTOS stands for Ecological City Transport System. Icelandic New Energy was responsible for this project, the aim of which was to demonstrate "state-of-the-art" hydrogen technology by running part of the public transport system with fuel cell buses in the city Reykjavík, the capital of Iceland. Hydrogen was produced from domestic geothermal and hydro-powered energy sources by electrolysis. The project ran from 2003 to 2005.

=== STEP ===
STEP sood for Sustainable Transport Energy for Perth. This initiative of the Government of Western Australia's Department for Planning and Infrastructure, was the responsibility of Transperth, though it was run by contracted operator Path Transit. The three Mercedes-Benz hydrogen fuel cell buses that operated in Perth were called "EcoBuses". The STEP project ran from 2001 to 2005, with the first buses in service in September 2004. The buses were withdrawn from service in 2007, with one bus subsequently preserved (albeit without the hydrogen fuel cells).

The Perth trial received A$2.5 million funding from the Department of the Environment and Heritage and the Australian Greenhouse Office. It was endorsed by the United Nations Environment Programme and the United Nations Industrial Development Organization.

BP produced the hydrogen as a by-product at its Kwinana Oil Refinery (50 kilometres (31.1 mi) south of Perth). The hydrogen was then transported by road in specially designed road tankers to a bus depot in the northern suburbs of Perth. Perth's buses achieved greater reliability and better fuel economy than in any other city in the trial.

By June 2005, the Perth buses had covered more than 60,000 kilometres (37,282 mi) and completed almost 3,000 operational hours, with almost 60,000 passengers having used the service.

- In 2004, STEP received a Chartered Institute of Logistics and Transport Outstanding Achievement award.
- In 2005, it was presented with a Banksia award in the "Government Leading by Example for a Sustainable Future" category.

=== China ===
In 2005, Beijing purchased three hydrogen fuel cell buses from the consortium using United Nations Development Programme grants. These buses entered service as the first fuel cell buses in China, in June 2006. Scientists and researchers hoped to demonstrate how emission free transport could be achieved in China. At the time, fossil fuels such as coal and oil made up 90 per cent of China's total energy use. However, the buses were withdrawn after one year, as air pollution reduced the efficiency and operating life of the fuel cells.

== Vehicles and partners ==
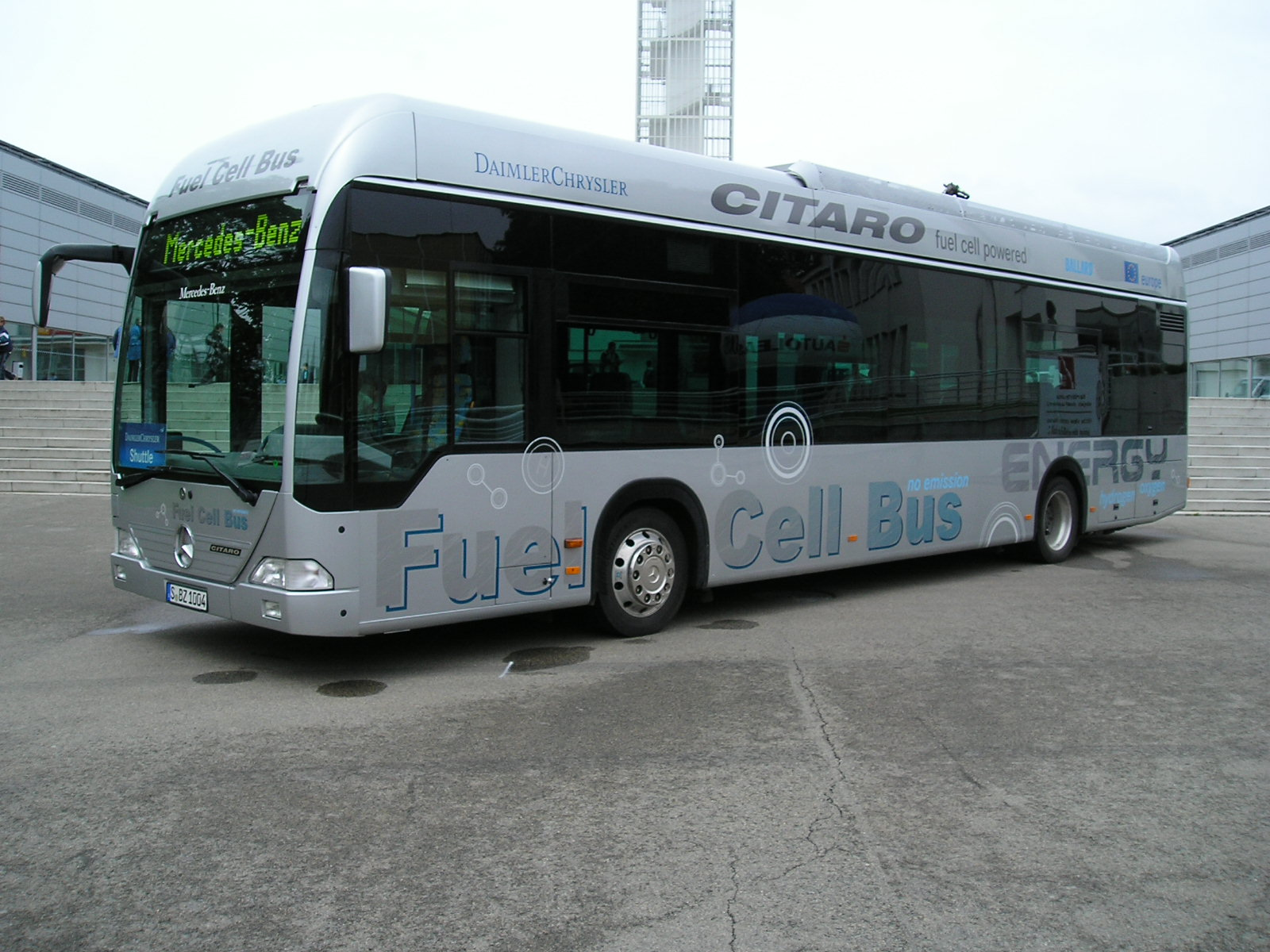
Mercedes-Benz Citaro fuel cell bus

All projects used Mercedes-Benz Citaro buses from DaimlerChrysler. They used hydrogen fuel cells were manufactured by XCELLSIS Fuel Cell Engines, now a division of Ballard Power Systems, and were developed as an alliance of Ballard, DaimlerChrysler, and Ford. In many cities, hydrogen fuel was provided by BP. At the time, they claimed to be the largest fleet of fuel cell buses in the world with 33 in regular service. The buses were estimated to cost US$1.2 million each and had a range of 300 kilometres (200 mi) and carried around 70 passengers.
