= The Boy Who Reversed Himself =

1986 science fiction novel by William Sleator

- Author: William Sleator
- Language: English
- Genre: Science fiction
- Publisher: Puffin Books
- Publication date: 1986
- Publication place: United States
- Media type: Print
- Pages: 167 p.
- ISBN: 9780140389654
- OCLC: 780503496

The Boy Who Reversed Himself (1986) is a science fiction novel by William Sleator. The novel deals with an exploration into other dimensions, and provides a journey into the world beyond our own.

== Plot summary ==
A high school girl, Laura, grows suspicious when a report of hers appears in mirror writing, and Omar, the weird boy next door, makes it go back to normal. Furthermore, he seems to be parting his hair on a different side than usual. He first refuses to explain what is happening, but after she repeatedly coaxes him, he reveals that he has access to the fourth dimension, where he accidentally "reversed" himself.

Omar eventually allows Laura to visit the fourth dimension under his supervision, but he warns her that it is dangerous and that he is violating an agreement by revealing the secret. Laura tries to use her access to the higher dimension to impress Pete, a popular boy she wants to accompany to the school dance, but after she seems to disappear into thin air and unlock a door from the other side, Pete realizes something strange has occurred, and she feels pressured to show him the truth, without Omar's knowledge. She takes Pete in the fourth dimension but soon become lost and abducted by 4-D creatures. Unfortunately, she determines that escaping might threaten the very existence of her own world by making the powerful 4-D creatures aware of it. With Omar's help, she finds a safe way out and learns the truth about how he learned of other dimensions.
