= Stepp =

Stepp is a surname. Notable people with the surname include:

- Andy Stepp (1958–2024), American politician
- Blake Stepp (born 1982), American basketball player
- Cathy Stepp (born 1963), American politician
- Hans-Karl Stepp (1914–2006), German soldier
- Laura Sessions Stepp (1951-2025), American author and journalist
- Rick Stepp (born 1973), American botanist
- William Hamilton Stepp (1875–1957), American fiddle player

== See also ==
- Step
- Stepps
