= House of Stairs (disambiguation) =

House of Stairs is a lithograph print by the Dutch artist M. C. Escher, and it also may refer to:

- House of Stairs (Sleator novel), a 1974 science fiction novel by William Sleator
- The House of Stairs (Vine novel), a 1988 novel by British writer Ruth Rendell, published under the name Barbara Vine
