= The Duplicate =

1988 novel by William Sleator

- Author: William Sleator
- Language: English
- Genre: Science fiction
- Publisher: Penguin Books
- Publication date: 1988
- Publication place: United States
- Media type: Print & paperback)
- Pages: 164 pages (Puffin paperback)

The Duplicate, published in 1988, is a science fiction novel for young adults written by William Sleator. The novel explores themes of identity.

== Plot summary ==
The main character, David, finds a device at the beach that can duplicate any living organism. After testing the device on his pet fish, David makes a clone of himself so that he could go on a date with his crush, Angela, while his clone attends his grandmother's birthday. His plan backfires because the Duplicate believes himself to be the original, and refuses to take orders. David ends up having to go to his grandmother's birthday after he loses a coin toss to the duplicate.

David's real problems begin when the Duplicate uses the device to create a clone of himself. The new duplicate is a less-than-perfect reproduction, being a copy of a copy, and has goals and desires that differ from the original David. Eventually, the second duplicate turns on Angela and the original David, and he has to find a way to stop him. Later, he stumbles upon something that will change his life.

== Critical reception ==
The book was praised by outlets including The New York Times, the St. Petersburg Times, and San Francisco Chronicle, which called the story "a singularly clear moment of horror intruding on daily life." Kirkus Reviews also praised the book, though writing that the characters, particularly Angela, lacked dimension.

== See also ==
- The Duplicated Man by James Blish and Robert Lowndes
- Round the Twist episode “The Copy”
