= House of Stairs (Sleator novel) =

1974 science fiction novel by William Sleator

- First edition
- Author: William Sleator
- Cover artist: Richard Cuffari
- Language: English
- Genre: Young adult, Science fiction novel
- Publisher: E.P. Dutton (1974); Puffin (1991); Firebird/Penguin (2004)
- Publication date: 1974
- Publication place: United States
- Media type: Print (hardback & paperback)
- ISBN: 0-14-034580-9
- OCLC: 22179595

House of Stairs (1974) is a science fiction novel by William Sleator about orphaned teenagers placed in a house of stairs, similar to the lithograph print by M. C. Escher, which provided the novel's title and setting, in a psychological exploitation of a social dynamics experiment.

Set in a dystopian America in the near future, the story tells of the experiences of five 16-year-olds who were living in orphanages who wake up to find themselves in a strange building that has no walls, no ceiling, and no floor: nothing but endless flights of stairs leading in every direction, seemingly infinite, so that it is impossible to get one's bearings or have perspective. On one landing is a basin of running water that serves as a toilet, sink and drinking fountain; on another, a machine with lights that intermittently produces food. The five, thrown together in these bizarre circumstances, must learn to deal with the others' disparate personalities, the lack of privacy and comfort, their clear helplessness, and a machine that only feeds them under gradually more exacting situations.

Certain episodes in the book suggest a scarcity economy, as the back-story of the characters differs based on apparently socioeconomic criteria. One of the characters validates that the food supply is "real meat...My mother and father...had it once." Another has had access to various goods apparently unavailable to others. Themes include suspicion of authority and social breakdown under stress, similar to William Golding's Lord of the Flies.

== Plot ==
The story is told largely from the point of view of Peter, a boy who has been labeled as slightly slow and tends to follow authority. The others are Lola, a rebellious juvenile delinquent who doesn't trust anyone; Blossom, an overweight, spoiled girl who grew up in pampered wealth but who has recently been orphaned; Oliver, a generous, self-confident, and arrogant athlete who has always been successful and popular; and Abigail, a pretty girl who is shy and kind but is easily misguided, and worries about what others think of her. Peter idolizes and seems to have a crush on Oliver, a boy who resembles someone Peter once knew. Peter bonds with Lola, who takes a protective stance toward him from the beginning.

As time drags on, the children need food, and during an argument where all of them are moving at once, a machine near them blinks its lights and releases a food pellet. The children hypothesize that it’s their specific movements altogether that enabled them to get the pellet, so they repeat the movements and actions to get another.

The pellets do not come out unless a very specific series of actions is taken, including positioning and movement, with no way to know what action to take next aside from trying it and hoping for a pellet. They spend their time “dancing” this way and adjusting their dance repeatedly until a pellet comes out, often blaming one another if the dance is even slightly off and a food pellet isn’t dispensed. There is a sense of reverence for the machine, as they do not wish to make it “mad” by getting the dance wrong and risking no food. By the end, with days and possibly weeks of dancing, the dance is intricate and very complex, with many steps, and the dance is so well rehearsed that each participant knows their role by heart, despite the actions being nonsensical yet hyperspecific.

Lola realizes that the machine is rewarding them with food if they display anti-social behavior, such as bullying and violence. Lola and Peter resist the pull of the machine and the desire to dance and retreat to another landing. Blossom, Abigail, and Oliver stay on the landing with the machine, and their behavior becomes increasingly nasty, both towards each other and also to Peter and Lola (who do not retaliate). Lola, feeling she is dying from lack of food, decides to go to the landing with the machine to get some food, but the scientists conducting the experiment remove all the teenagers from the House of Stairs before Lola reaches the machine. Lola and Peter then require extensive medical care owing to the starvation they endured.

The book ends with the explanation of the social experiment from a scientist. Peter and Lola are branded as misfits because they resisted the behavior modification experiments. Outside, the other three teenagers who did succumb to the machine (Blossom, Abigail, and Oliver) notice a stoplight; when the stoplight flashes green, the three teenagers automatically begin to dance, just as they did when the food machine began to blink in the building, suggesting the conditioning to have lasting effects despite them being far away from the original stimulus.

== Film adaptation ==
In 2011, the Vancouver-based production house Zest Productions announced executive Scott G. Hyman (500 Days of Summer) had optioned the movie rights to House of Stairs. Montreal-based genre writer Doug Taylor was reported to have been hired to adapt the story, and that Hyman, Michael Glassman and Michael Solomon would produce.

As the film was intended to be live action but very VFX heavy, they intended to shoot it in Montreal to take advantage of local tax breaks for live action/CGI hybrids, with packaging to take place in the second half of 2012. However, the project remains listed as "under development" on IMDB, with no further production or release dates.
