= Spirit house (Dakelh) =

Ritual structures among the Dakelh of British Columbia

Spirit houses are above-ground wooden structures traditionally used by some Dakelh (Carrier) communities in Northern British Columbia, such as those in Nazko, as part of their burial practices. These small houses are placed over graves and often contain personal belongings or offerings left by family and clan members to support the spirit of the deceased in the afterlife. Historically, spirit houses were also associated with taboos and spiritual caution, as it was believed that improper interaction with them could attract harmful spirits.
