= Smart Traveler Enrollment Program =

Consular service for U.S. citizens

The Smart Traveler Enrollment Program (STEP) is a service provided by the U.S. Department of State for U.S. citizens and nationals traveling and living abroad to enroll their trip with the nearest U.S. embassy or consulate.

== Enrollment process ==
Enrollment for STEP involves first visiting the STEP website and creating a login. Following this, users are provided with the option to fill out a detailed profile, including contact information (such as email and contact phone number) and residences abroad.

For the next stage in the enrollment process, the itinerary for each specific trip can be entered on the website. Information which can be entered includes arrival and departure dates, destination country, closest embassy or consulate, purpose of visit, and emergency contact information.

== Benefits of enrollment ==
STEP enrollees get alerts, warnings, and notifications with detailed information if there are problems or risks related to the areas they are traveling during specific travel dates. This particular benefit can be obtained without enrolling in STEP, by proactively checking and filtering the full alert list issued by the U.S. Department of State. These alerts and notifications are, by default, at the country level and may not capture events limited to specific regions of the country.

Itinerary and contact information filled in by STEP enrollees, can also be used by the U.S. Department of State to help locate persons in case of an emergency, and can also help with issues such as the replacement of lost or stolen passports.

== See also ==
- Facebook Safety Check
