= The Spirit House =

1993 novel by William Sleator

- Author: William Sleator
- Language: English
- Publication date: November 1, 1993
- Publication place: United States
- Media type: Print
- Followed by: Dangerous Wishes

The Spirit House is a 1993 young adult novel written by American author William Sleator. It was later followed up with Dangerous Wishes, published in 1995.

== Plot ==
The Spirit House follows the character of Julie, a young girl whose family is housing exchange student Bia. When Julie's younger brother builds a Thai Spirit House for Bia, strange things begin to happen and Julie's luck begins to turn, Bia turns out to be an imposter, and this leads to both of them fighting for the favor of an angry spirit.

== Reception ==
Kirkus Reviews praised The Spirit House, calling it "a feat" and "a treat". The Boston Globe's Stephanie Loer wrote that the book had a "terrific twist" and that "fans will not be disappointed". Jon Scieszka praised the book as an "eerie novel of suspense". The School Library Journal stated that while the "premise is clever and the characterization of Bia is convincing", the book "as a whole is sketchy and underdeveloped, more like a detailed outline than a fully realized novel" and "the thematic confrontation of Western logic and Eastern superstition seems heavy-handed".
