= Toyota Sora =

Electric/hydrogen transit bus

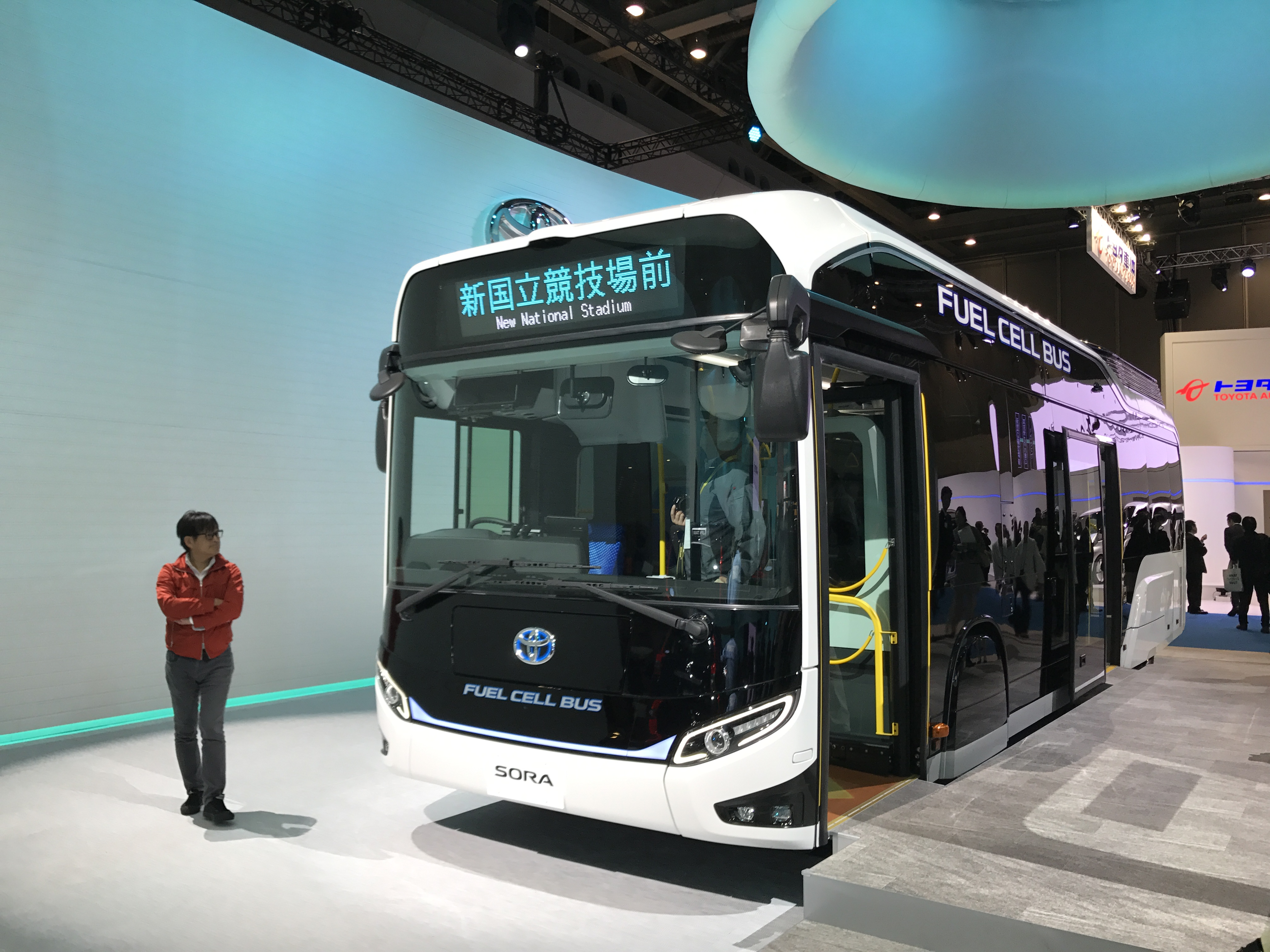

Overview
- Manufacturer: Toyota
- Model code: ZBC-MUM1NAE
- Production: 2018–present
- Assembly: Japan: Komatsu, Ishikawa (J-Bus, 2018–2026); Utsunomiya, Tochigi (J-Bus; 2026–)

Body and chassis
- Class: Transit bus
- Body style: Single-decker bus
- Chassis: Low-entry

Powertrain
- Engine: Fuel-cell
- Electric motor: 2x AC synchronous drive motors 114 kW (153 hp; 155 PS)
- Transmission: Full automatic electric motor transmission
- Battery: 235 kWh NiMH battery
- Range: 200 km (124.3 mi)

Dimensions
- Length: 10,525 mm (414.4 in)
- Width: 2,490 mm (98.0 in)
- Height: 3,340 mm (131.5 in)

The Toyota Sora (Japanese: トヨタ SORA, Hepburn: Toyota Sora) is a transit bus with an electric motor powered by hydrogen fuel cells produced by Toyota, developed in cooperation with Hino Motors. The bus uses components originally developed for the Toyota Mirai, a mid-size fuel cell sedan. The name Sora is an abbreviation of the words Sky, Ocean, River and Air and refers to the water cycle.

== Technical details ==
With a capacity of 78 passengers, the Sora uses fuel cells to power the bus, in which 10 tanks carrying 600 litres of hydrogen feeds two sets of polymer electrolyte fuel cells which can produces an output of 116 kW (155 hp). A single refuelling takes only 10 minutes for a 200 km (120-mile) journey compared to conventional battery electric buses which takes around 5 hours for the batteries to be fully charged. The bus is also equipped with an external power supply system which can be used as an emergency source of electricity, providing external consumers with up to 235 kWh of electricity with a maximum power of 9 kW.

== Features ==
The Sora uses an automatic stopping system. It follows lines on the road and, using automatic steering and braking, stops the bus from 3 to 6 cm (1 to 2 in) from the edge of the stop, and also not more than 10 cm (4 in) in front of or behind the designated stop line. The bus has an environment monitoring system based on eight cameras located inside and outside the vehicle, combined with radar and a collision warning system, to detect pedestrians and cyclists in the vicinity and alert the driver to their presence using audible and visual signals. The bus is also equipped with an acceleration control function, which protects standing passengers from too rapid acceleration.

The Sora cooperates with the ITS Connect system, which uses communication between vehicles and between vehicles and road infrastructure to improve driving safety, as well as systems supporting bus convoys and ensuring priority at traffic lights (Public Transportation Priority Systems). Toyota buses can exchange information about traffic, pedestrians or changes in lights with other vehicles. The Emergency Driving Stop System also allows passengers to stop the vehicle in an emergency, for example if the driver collapses.

== Sales and export ==
The Sora made its debut at the Tokyo Motor Show in 2017. It went on sale in Japan on 7 March 2018 with more than 100 buses in the public transport fleet, mainly for Tokyo BRT, Keikyu Bus and Toei Bus, ahead of the 2020 Olympic and Paralympic Games, which took place in the Japanese capital.

In Europe, the Sora is sold as a chassis fitted with Caetano H2.City Gold bodywork supplied by Portuguese manufacturer Salvador Caetano, who have been a long-time partner for importing Toyota commercial vehicles into Europe. As of 2022, numerous orders for Caetano-bodied Soras have been placed, predominantly in Germany.

== Gallery ==
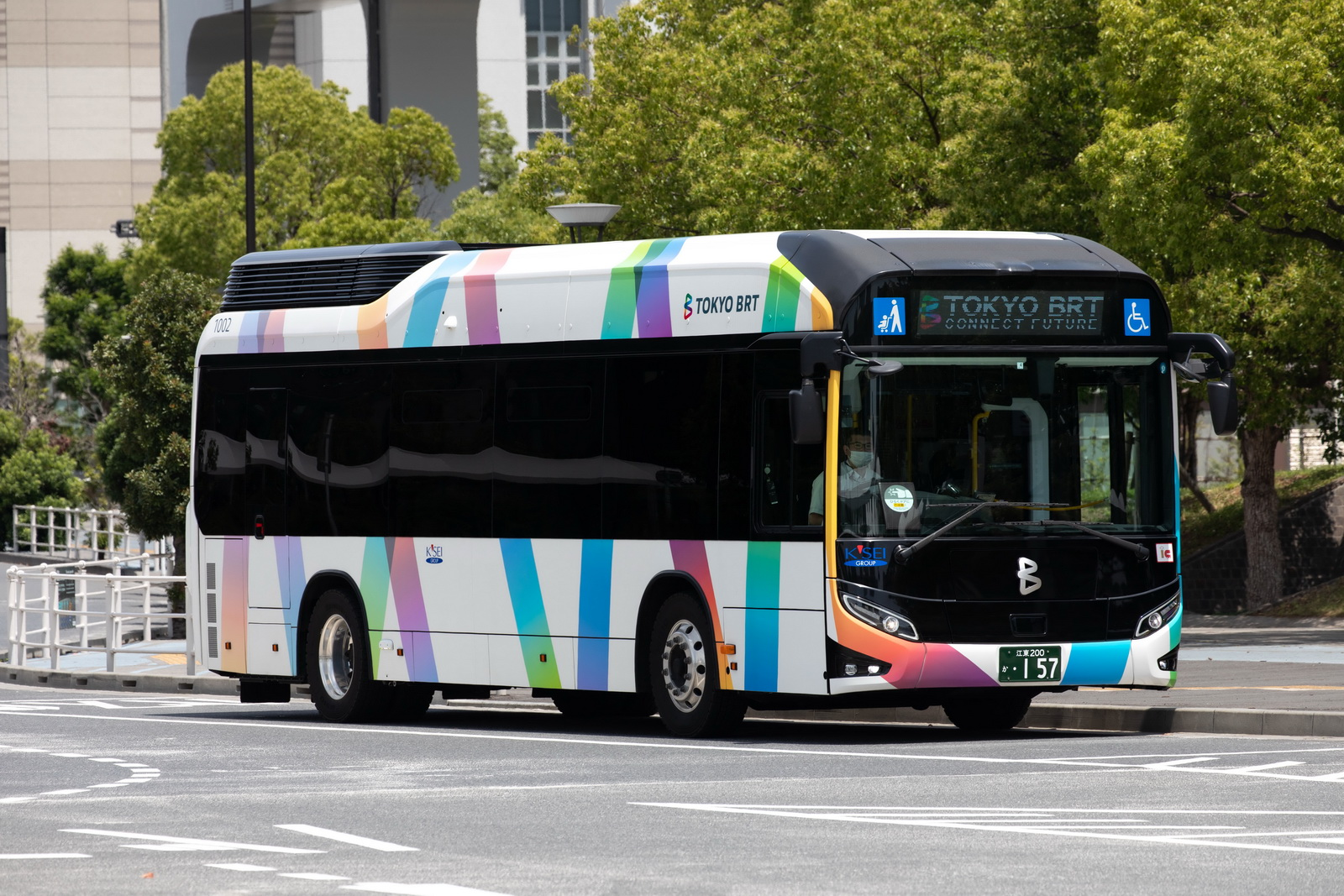
Tokyo BRT operated by Keisei Bus

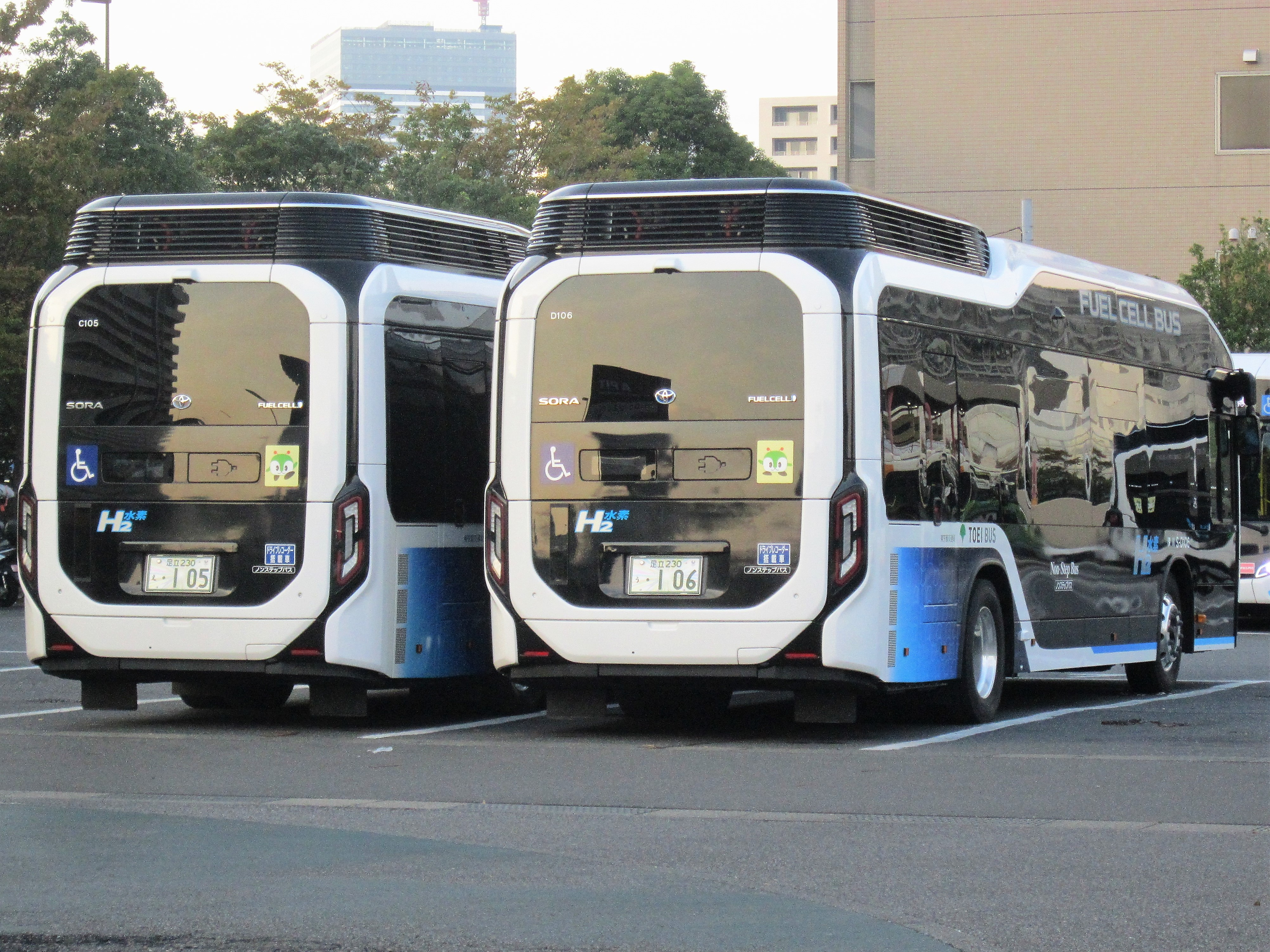
Toei Bus, rear

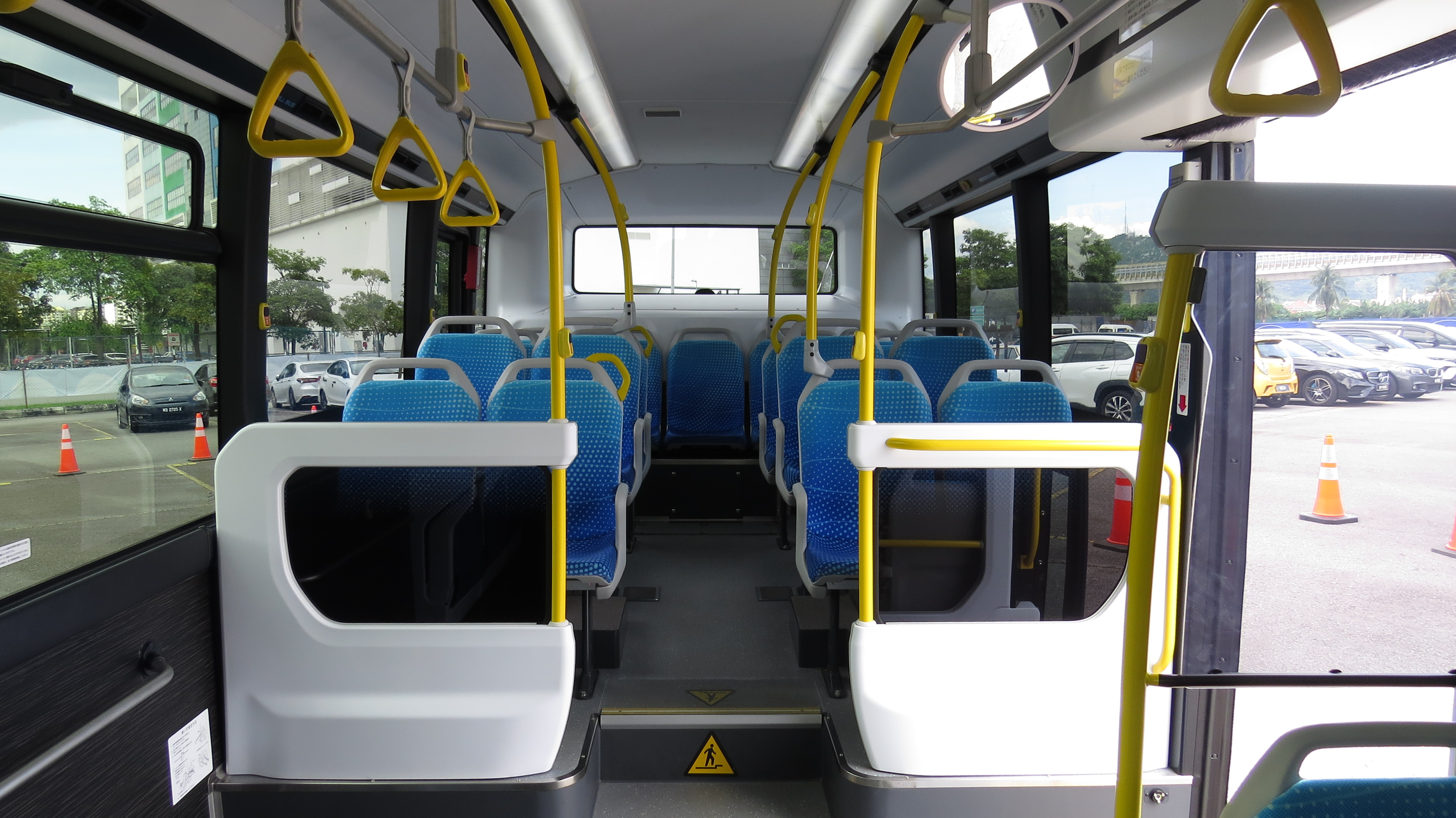
Interior of the Toyota Sora, which has 25 seatings and can carry up to 79 passengers

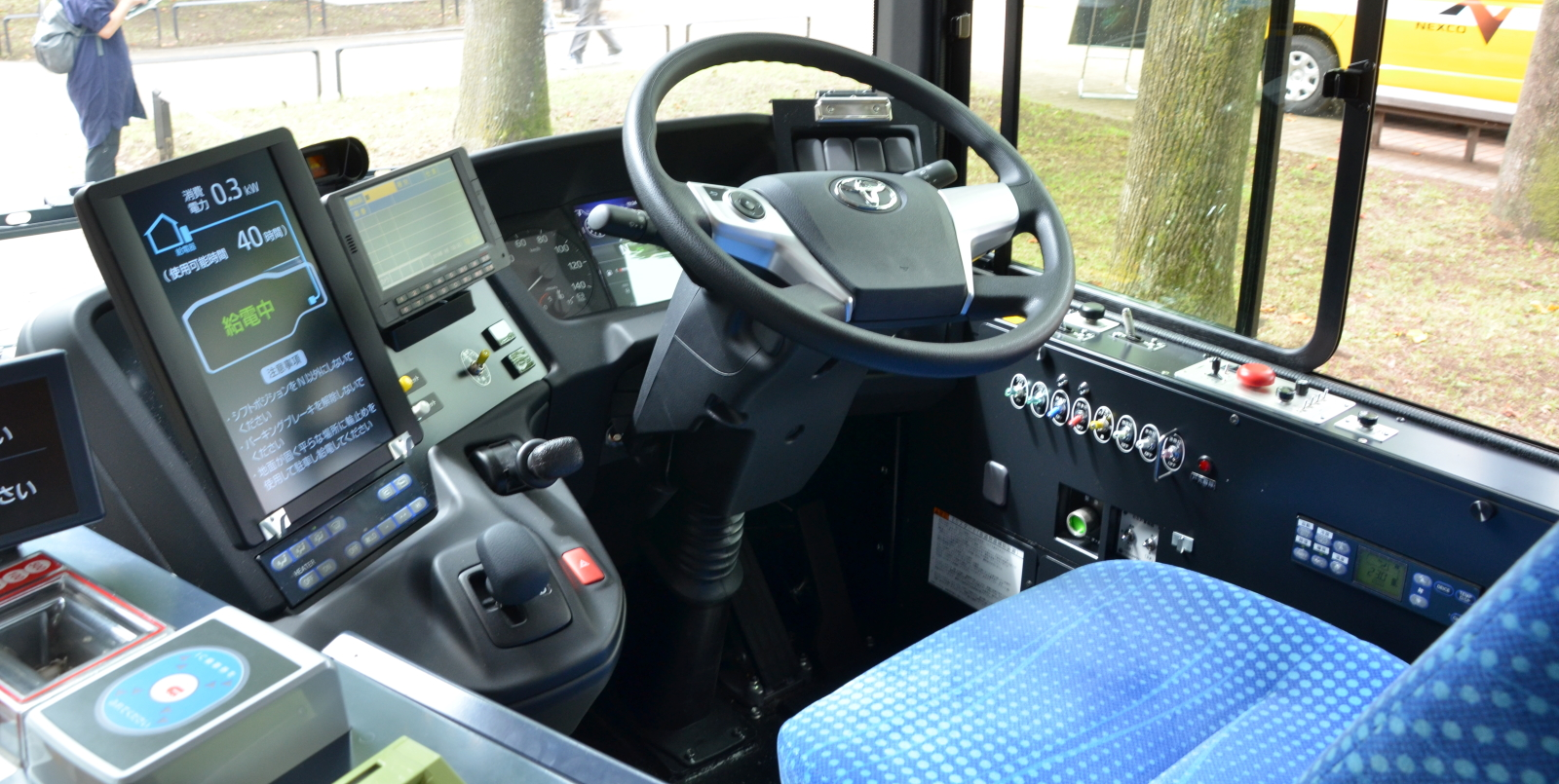
Driver cockpit of Toyota Sora
