= Mitsubishi Fuso Canter =

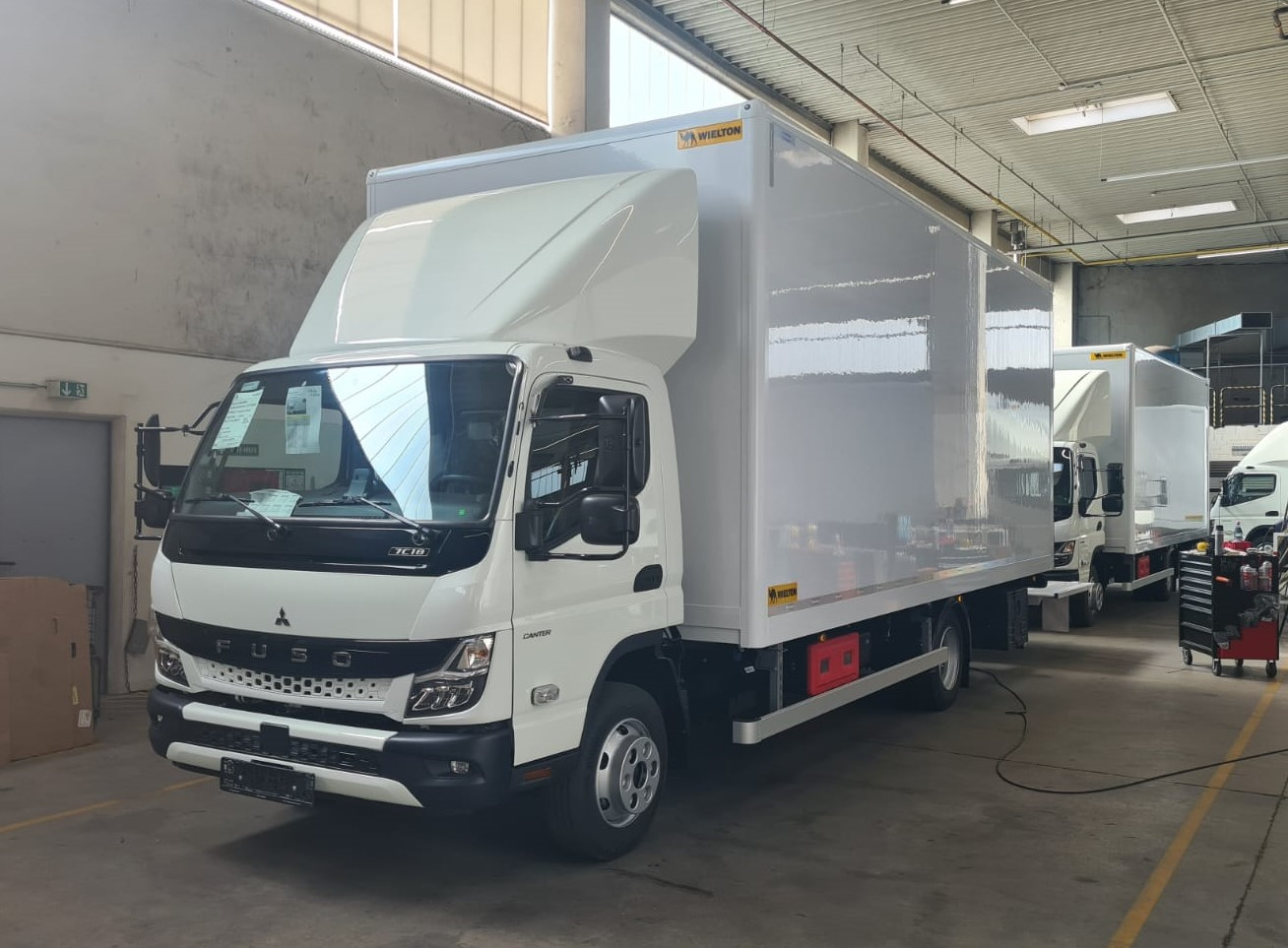

Overview
- Manufacturer: Mitsubishi Motors Corporation (1963–2002); Mitsubishi Fuso Truck and Bus Corporation (2003–present)
- Also called: Mitsubishi Fuso Colt Diesel (Indonesia, 1975–2022); Mitsubishi Fuso FE; Sterling 360; Hyundai Mighty (5th generation); Nissan NT450 Atlas (8th generation); UD Kazet (8th generation); Mitsubishi Fuso Fighter Mignon (7.5t+ variant); RIZON Trucks (2023-Present)
- Production: 1963–present
- Assembly: Cairo, Egypt (Ghabbour Group); Tramagal, Portugal; Pulo Gadung, Jakarta, Indonesia (KTB); Cainta, Rizal, Philippines (1964–2015); Santa Rosa, Laguna, Philippines (Jan 2015–present); Barcelona, Anzoategui, Venezuela; Pekan, Malaysia (HICOM), Adana, Turkey (Temsa); Naberezhnye Chelny, Russia (Fuso KAMAZ Trucks Rus)

Body and chassis
- Class: Truck 3.5-8.5t GVW
- Body style: Truck (standard cab, crew cab)

The Mitsubishi Fuso Canter (Japanese: 三菱ふそう・キャンター, Hepburn: Mitsubishi Fusō Kyantā) is a line of light-duty commercial vehicles manufactured by Mitsubishi Fuso Truck and Bus Corporation, part of Daimler Truck AG.The Canter is manufactured since 1963, now in its eighth generation. The Canter is named after the English word describing the gait of a horse, emphasising the "thoroughbred" nature of Mitsubishi trucks.

In Japan, its traditional competitors are the Isuzu Elf, the Toyota Dyna and the Nissan Atlas.

== Production and sales ==
Early export sales began to South East Asia only, but shortly later the series began seeing export to other markets including Australia, New Zealand, the Near East and since the mid-eighties North America. Indonesia (there named "Colt Diesel" until 2022) has become the biggest export market, followed by the Near East and Taiwan. In total the Canter is marketed to more than 150 countries. Fuso operates its own factories in Japan, Chennai/India and Tramagal/Portugal, further assemblies from CKD kits exist in Egypt, Portugal, Jakarta, the Philippines, Malaysia, Turkey and Russia. The Tramagal factory supplies to Western Europe (European Union plus Norway and Switzerland) at a local sourcing rate of 50%.

Early after the DaimlerChrysler–Mitsubishi alliance was established the MMC distribution network in Europe was closed and taken over by Daimler. When the alliance failed Daimler already owned the majority in MFTBC and sales rights remained at Daimler.

== Product ==
At its beginning the Canter was a narrow vehicle with 2 tons of payload. About since the introduction of the fourth generation the line-up of the Canter was increasingly expanded und today the Canter label covers a variety of products. Presumably starting with the fifth generation the JDM Fighter Mignon was sold for Export as "Canter 75", "Canter HD" or "Canter FH", during the seventh generation a twin rear axle Canter was available and since 2018 the Nissan NV350 is exported to the Near East as a Canter Van. Nowadays there are two line-ups in parallel (Eighth generation and General Export Models) each with narrow or wide variants from 3.5 to 8.5 tons gross weight. In Japan the Canter series include the Canter Guts, a 1.5 ton payload truck specially adopted to the rules for the Japanese class of compact vehicles but the term Guts is not always used. Further adoptions exist to local markets including engines and exhaust gas treatments.

In 2010, still with the seventh generation, at Tramagal new more environmentally friendly power trains were introduced with Iveco F1C diesel engines by Fiat Power Train (FPT) and transmissions from ZF Friedrichshafen. The eighth generation fitted with these "World Engines" is determined to developed countries with strict emission limits, furthermore it is available as EcoHybrid and as an all-electric eCanter. For developing countries a simplified version with Mitsubishi engines is available as General Export Modell.

There are several naming systems depending on time and market. E.g., in Japan a Canter 15 is a truck with 1.5 tons payload while pretty much the same truck in Europe was denominated as Canter 35 because of its 3.5 tons gross weight. In Indonesia model names are based on the chassis codes (F codes, e.g. FE71, FE83) opposed to North America where the numerical part of the model name represents the gross weight in hecto pounds (hlb.), e.g. FE130 is a 13,000 lb. truck. Starting with the seventh generation Fuso introduced a naming system similar to that used by parent company Daimler in Europe, in Australia and New Zealand a similar system had been introduced. This system is preferably used here because of its expressiveness (for details see model box of seventh generation).

== History ==
=== First generation (T720) ===
The very first Canter was the successor of the T710 produced from 1960 through 1963. The T720 Canter had two round single headlights but the facelifted version from 1964 had a set of round twin headlights. At a payload of 2 tons it was equipped either with the 90 PS (66 kW) KE42 gasoline engine or the 68 PS (50 kW) 4DQ11A diesel engine.

=== Second generation (T90) ===
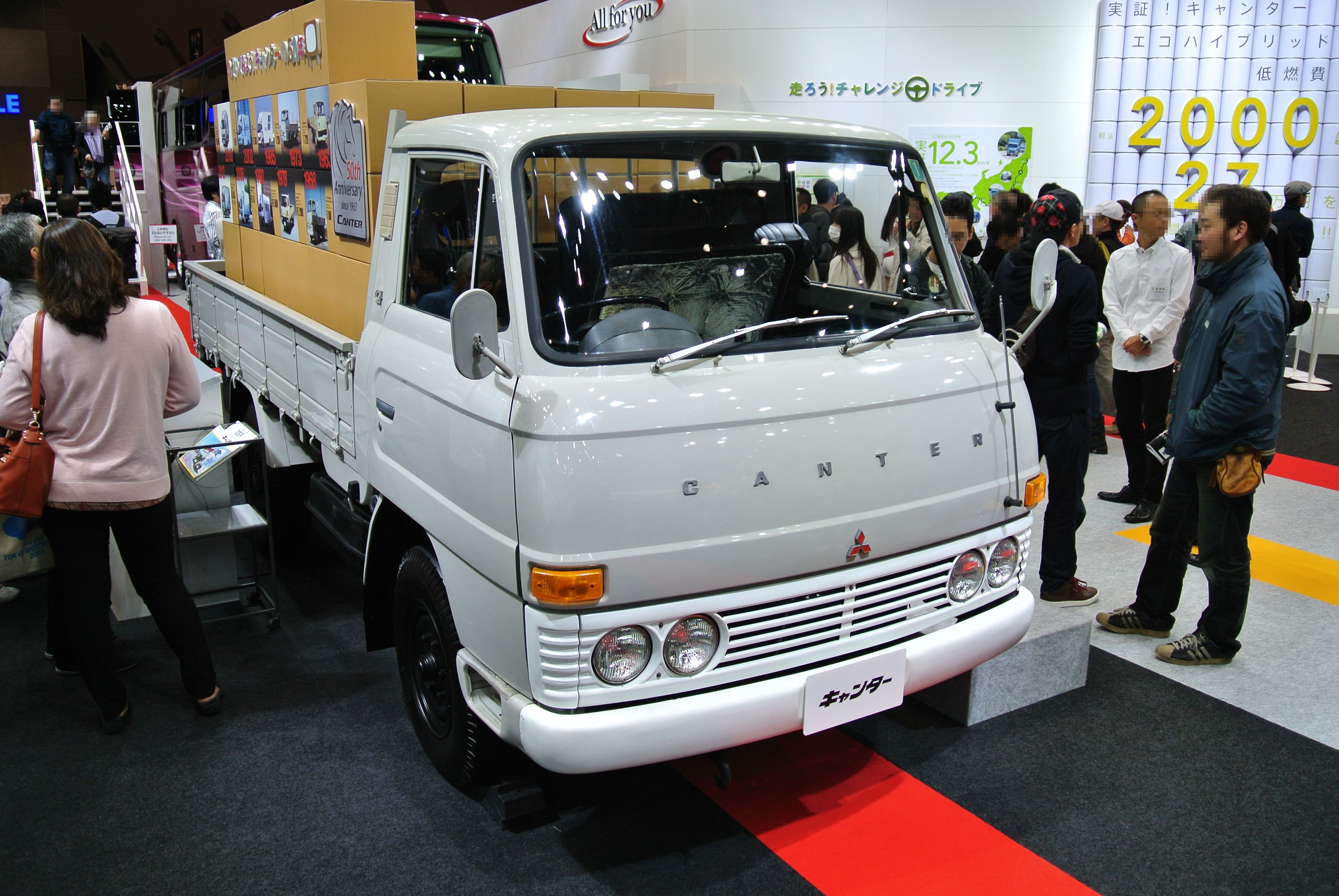
2nd generation T90

The second generation Canter appeared in 1968 with a 4DR1 diesel engine at 55 kW (74 hp) and two gasoline options: the T91's 90 PS (66 kW; 89 hp) KE42 was known from the first generation Canter, while long wheelbase versions (T93/97) received a 95 PS (70 kW; 94 hp) 2.3-liter KE47 gasoline engine. The most common diesel version was the T90, available on a short or a long wheelbase. There was also a dual rear wheel version of the long wheelbase model with the T92 chassis code. In July 1970 a 2.7 L 59 kW (79 hp) 4DR5 diesel option was added.

=== Third generation (T200) ===
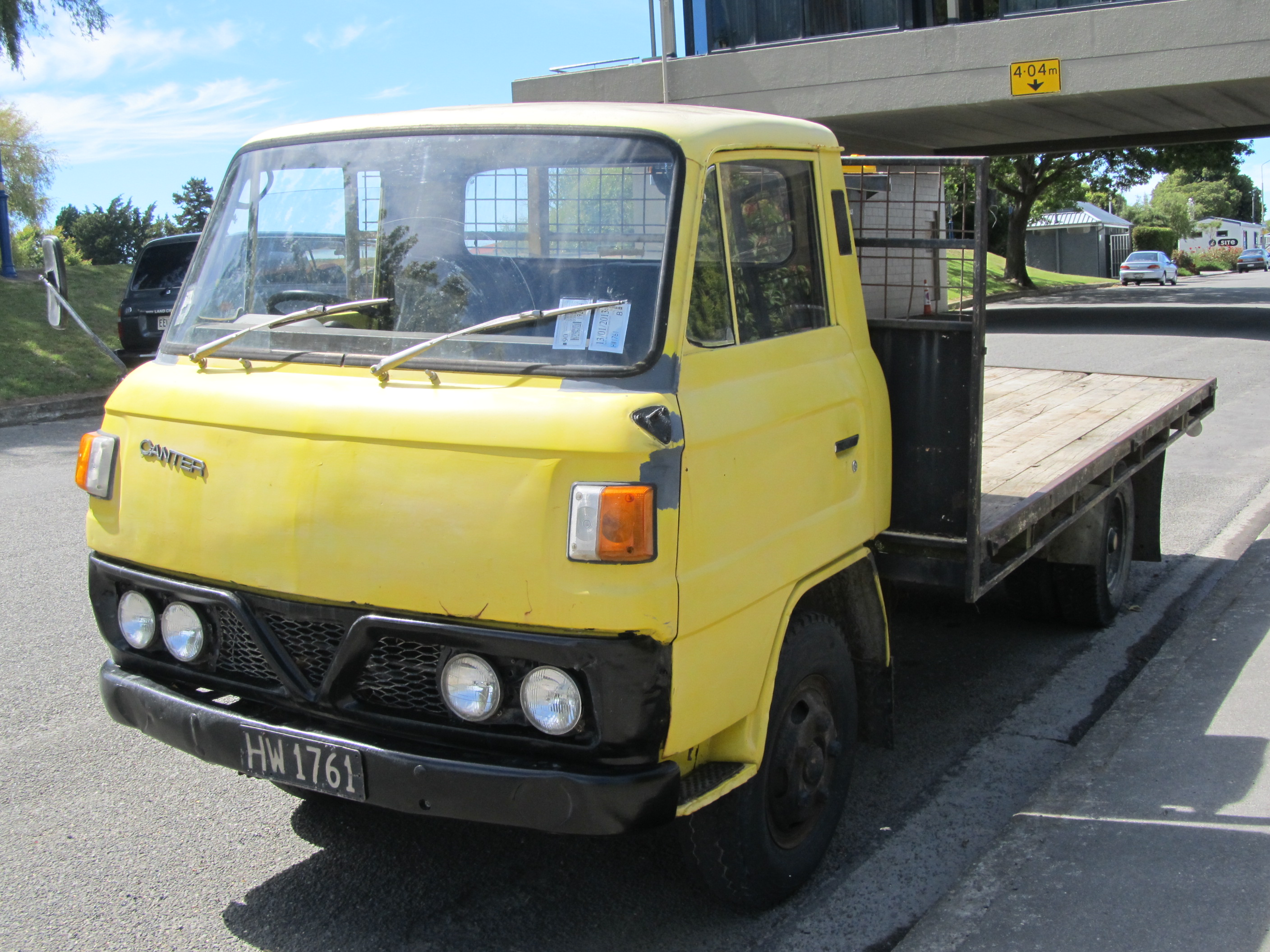
3rd generation T200 (1976)

The T200 series was structured into the diesel engined T200/T210 (4DR5, 80 PS [59 kW]) and the T205/215 with the 2,315 cc 100 PS (74 kW) KE47 gasoline engine, moreover the 1,995 cc 95 PS (70 kW) KE42 was still available. In January 1975, the gasoline engines were replaced by the 4G52 (1,995 cc; 100 PS [74 kW]) and 4G53 (2,384 cc; 110 PS [81 kW]). The third generation was sold with various wheelbases and bed heights. A 3-ton payload variant was also available.

=== Fourth generation ===
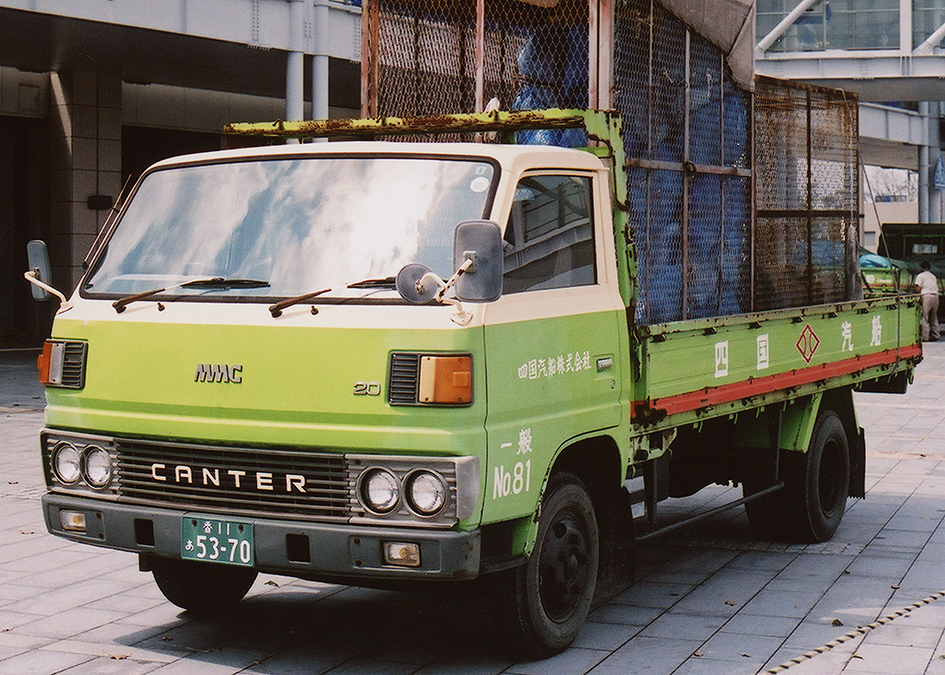
Canter 4th generation (wide cab)

Starting with the fourth generation in Japan the Canter was supplemented by variants with 2- and 3-ton wide cabins. In February 1980, a power steering for the wide vehicles was added as an option, at the end of the same year a narrow 1.5 ton and a wide 3.5 ton followed. New diesel engines 4D30 (indirect injection, naturally aspirated, 90 PS [66 kW]) and 4D31 (direct injection naturally asparated or turbo charged, 115 PS [85 kW]) were added in November 1982. According to some sources ratings of these engines were slightly higher at 100 PS (74 kW) and 130 PS (96 kW), perhaps due to the use of gross ratings. In December 1983, a "Walk Through Van" with 1.5 tons completed the line-up. All weights mentioned here are payloads.

European sales began in the Benelux countries in the late 1970s. About 200 of the narrow cabined fourth generation Canters had been sold there by 1980, when local assembly of a wide-bodied Canter in Belgium by importer Moorkens N V was begun on a trial basis. The Canter ended up being built in Tramagal, Portugal instead since 1980. Later in October 2004, the factory achieved a production capacity of 15,000 units per year and shift with approximately 430 employees. More than 110,000 vehicles had been produced there since then.

The fourth generation Canter was mostly available with a variety of diesel engines, but a 2555 cc 4G54 petrol inline-four engine producing 103 PS (76 kW) was fitted to the FC 35 model.

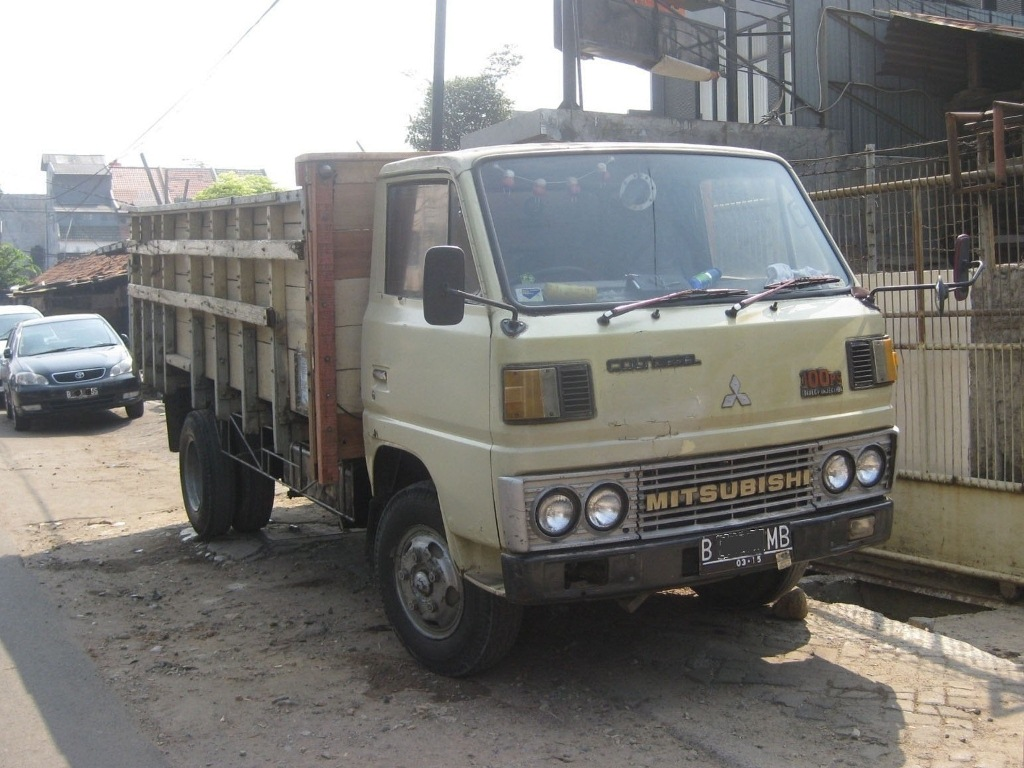
Canter 4th generation (standard cab), sold as Colt Diesel (FE114) in Indonesia

| Modell (Europe) | Canter 35 | Canter 46 | Canter 55 |
|---|---|---|---|
| Gross Weight | 3.5 t | 4.6 t | 5.5 t |
| max. Payload (estimated) | 1.5 t | 2.1 t | 3.0 t |
| Transmission (Standard) | 5-speed manual | | |
Estimated Payloads are meant for a better understanding of the text.

| Engine (Japan) | Prod.Run | Displacement | Power @ 1/min | Torque @ 1/min | Fuel system | Valve train | Aspiration |
|---|---|---|---|---|---|---|---|
| 4G62 | | 1.995 L | 74 kW | | petrol with single carburetor | SOHC | natural |
| 4DR51A | | 2.659 L | 54 kW | | Swirl combustion + In-line Injection pump | | natural |
| 4DR5 | | 2.659 L | 59 kW @ 3700 | | Swirl combustion + In-line Injection pump | | natural |
| 4D30 | 11/82- | 3.276 L | 66 kW | 215 Nm @ 2200 | Indirect Injection + In-line Injection pump | OHV | natural |
| 4D31 | 11/82- | 3.276 L | 86 kW | 279 Nm @ 2000 | Direct Injection + In-line Injection pump | OHV | Naturally asparated or Turbo |
4DR51A is a 4DR5 resp. a subversion of it. 54 kW is presumably false, because in the predecessor the engine was already indicated with 59 kW. The 4D30 may have been a swirl combustion engine.

=== Fifth generation ===
The fifth generation Canter appeared in October 1985. Its overall appearance was more square and smoother than the previous model, while larger, single, rectangular headlights replaced the earlier twin round units. Some export markets, such as the United States, kept using twin round headlights to meet local requirements. In the domestic Japanese market, the front "MMC" emblem was changed to the corporate three diamond logo, with an MMC emblem remaining on the passenger door. Because of its cabin originating from the Canter the Fighter Mignon became marketed outside Japan as a 7.5 ton (gross) Canter 75, Canter HD or FH series. Also new was the adoption of front disc brakes on some models, while the shift lever location was changed from the column to the floor and later to the top of the engine cover between the driver's and the centre seat.

In July 1986, a 4WD option was added to the Canter 20 and Canter 30 series. The lightweight Canter 15 changed its name to Canter Guts (a name only used in the domestic Japanese market) in January 1987. Japanese designations like "Canter 15" indicated the payload (1.5 t) while European designations like "Canter 35" are related to the gross weight.

In November 1989, the Canter underwent a facelift, with a reshaped front grill, and was also able to comply with the new 1989 vehicle emissions regulations. In June 1991 ABS brakes became available, a first for the class in the home market. At the same time, power windows became standard equipment across the board.

In the North American market the Canter was available as the Mitsubishi Fuso FE (Class 3), FG (4WD version of the FE), and FH (Class 5). The FE and FG were both powered by a turbocharged and intercooled four-cylinder diesel engine with 127 hp (95 kW) while the larger FH had a 145 hp (108 kW) six-cylinder turbodiesel. A variety of wheelbases from 108 to 180 in (2,700 to 4,600 mm) were offered.

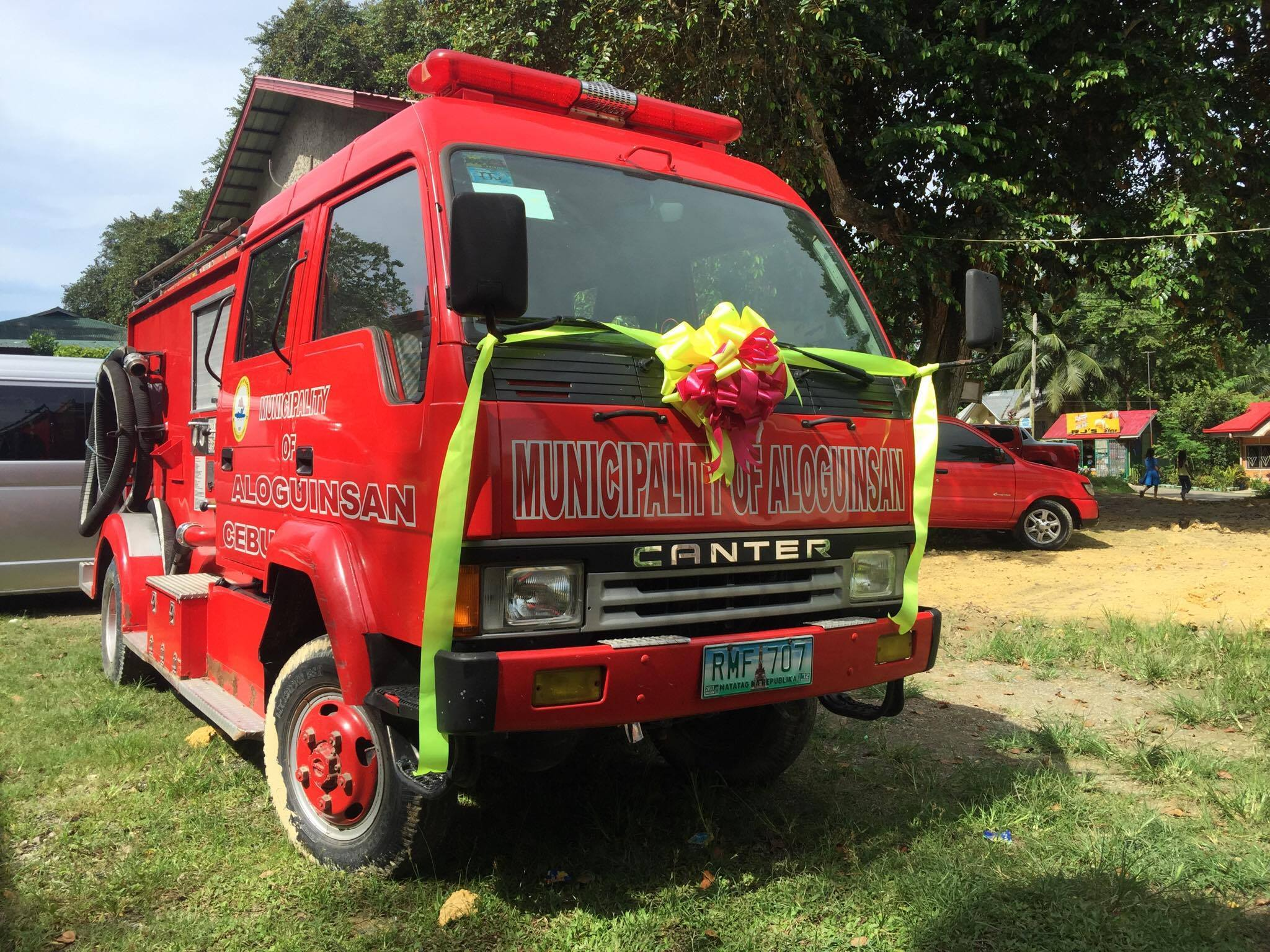
Fifth generation Mitsubishi Fuso Canter 20, pre-facelift model in Cebu, Philippines.

| Model (Europe) | Canter 35 | Canter 60 | Canter 75 |
|---|---|---|---|
| also called | | FE444 | FH100 |
| Gross Weight | 3.5 t | 6.0 t | 7.5 t |
| max. Payload (estimated) | 1.5 t | 2.5 t | 3.5 t |
| Engine (Europe) | 4M40/4D31 | 4D30/4D31 | 6Zyl. |
| Transmission (Standard) | 5-speed manual | | |
Estimated Payloads are meant for a better understanding of the text.

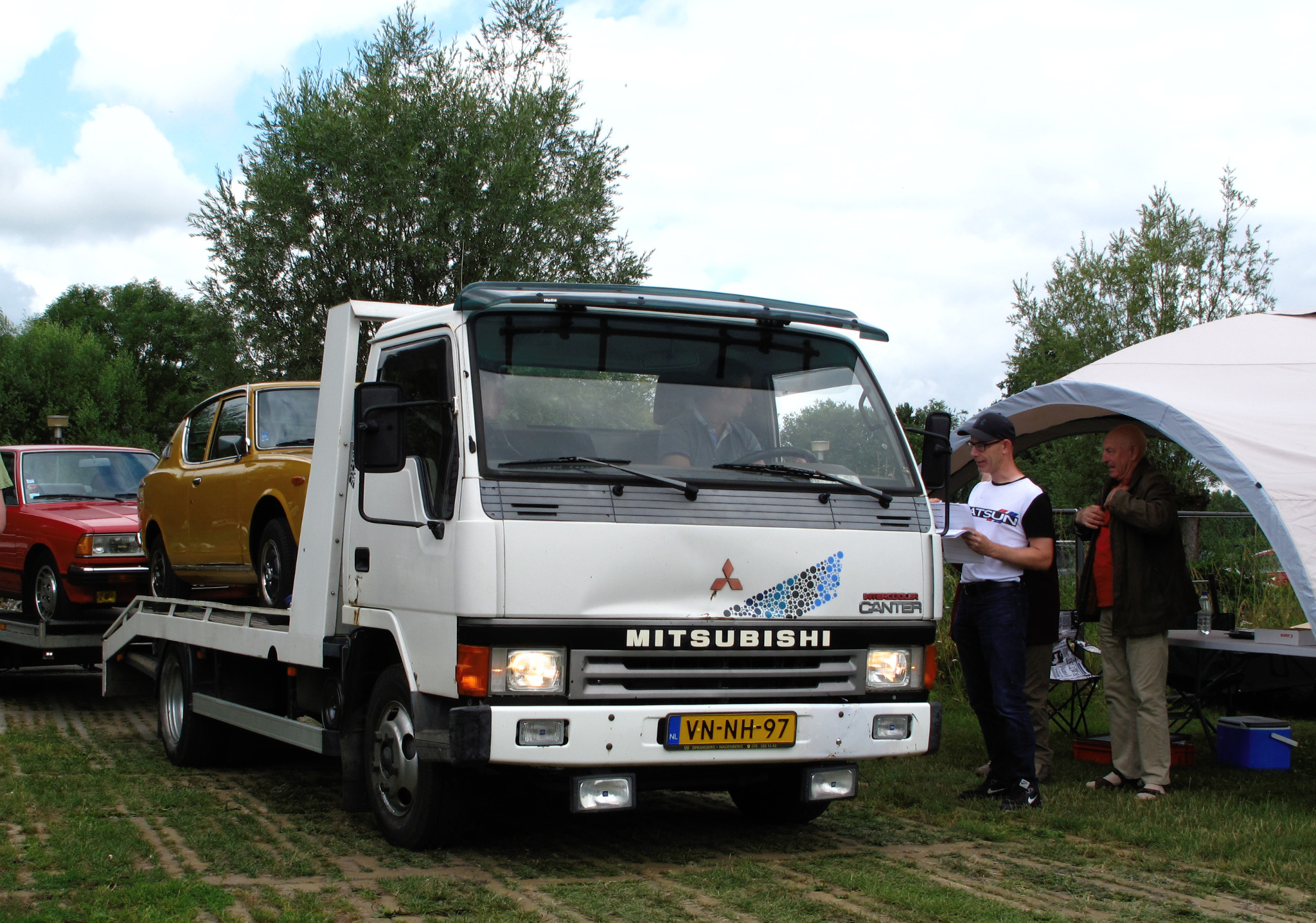
5th Gen Mitsubishi Fuso Canter vehicle carrier in Europe

| Engine (Japan) | Prod.Run | Displacement | Power @ 1/min | Torque @ 1/min | Fuel system | Valve train | Aspiration |
|---|---|---|---|---|---|---|---|
| 4G63 | 1990- | 1.997 L | | | petrol with carburetor | OHC | natural |
| 4DR5 | -1/87~ | 2.659 L | | | Swirl combustion + In-line Injection pump | | natural |
| 4DR7 | ~5/91- | 2.835 L | | | Swirl combustion + In-line Injection pump | | natural |
| 4D32 | ~3/86-11/93~ | 3.567 L | | | Direct Injection + In-line Injection pump | OHV | natural |
| 4D33 | ~9/91~ | 4.214 L | | | Direct Injection + In-line Injection pump | OHV | natural |
| 4D34 | ~4/92~ | 3.908 L | | | Direct Injection + In-line Injection pump | OHV | Turbo |
| 4D36 | ~8/94- | 3.56 L | | | Direct Injection + In-line Injection pump | OHV | |
Presumably the 4G52 used on the predecessor had been utilized on the 5th generation until 1990. The petrol engines, the 4DR. and 4M40 were utilized in the lightest vehicles only. Until 1995/96 the 4M40 could have actually been 4D56. ~1990- resp. -2001~ means the engine was utilized "starting from 1990 or earlier" resp. "until 2001 or later", ~1995~ stands for "around 1995".

| Engine (Europe) | Prod.Run | Displacement | Power @ 1/min | Torque @ 1/min | Fuel system | Valve train | Aspiration |
|---|---|---|---|---|---|---|---|
| 4M40 | 1982-1/89 | 2.5 L | 51 kW | 149 Nm @ 2300 | Swirl combustion | OHC | natural |
| 4M40 | 1/89- | 2.477 L | 55 kW | 152 Nm @ 2300 | Swirl combustion | OHC | natural |
| 4D30 | | 3.298 L | 66 kW | 215 Nm @ 2200 | Direct Injection + In-line Injection pump | OHV | natural |
| 4D31 | ~10/95~ | 3.298 L | 86 kW | 279 Nm @ 2000 | Direct Injection + In-line Injection pump | OHV | Turbo |
| (6Zyl.) | | 4.948 L | 107 kW | 355 Nm @ 2000 | Direct Injection + In-line Injection pump | | Turbo |
Presumably the 4G52 used on the predecessor had been utilized on the 5th generation until 1990. The petrol engines, the 4DR. and 4M40 were utilized in the lightest vehicles only. Until 1995/96 the 4M40 could have actually been 4D56. ~1990- resp. -2001~ means the engine was utilized "starting from 1990 or earlier" resp. "until 2001 or later", ~1995~ stands for "around 1995".

=== Sixth generation ===
The sixth generation of the Canter was introduced in Japan in November 1993, in Europe in 1996. In November 1995, the line-up was supplemented with variants in standard (narrow) 3.5 tons and wide 4 tons payload. In October 1997, the all-wheel drive of the Guts in Japan was modified from on-demand with crawler to a permanent system. Starting from 2002 all European Canters were permitted to tow trailers up to 3.5 tons gross weight. With a final make-over in 2004, ABS was added to some variants.

In Malaysia this generation was sold from 1996 to 2010. After that, the 7th generation was introduced.

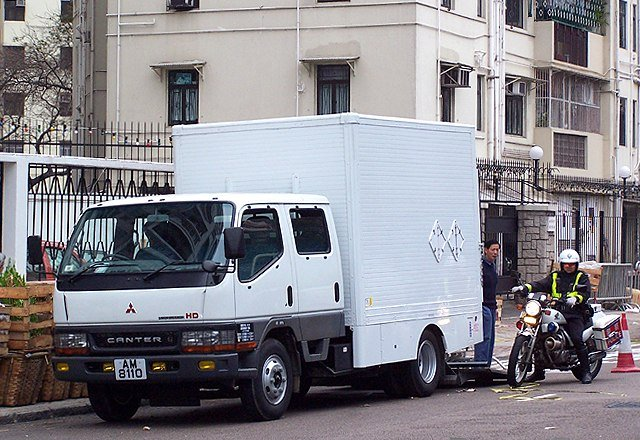
A 6th generation Canter used by the Hong Kong Police Force

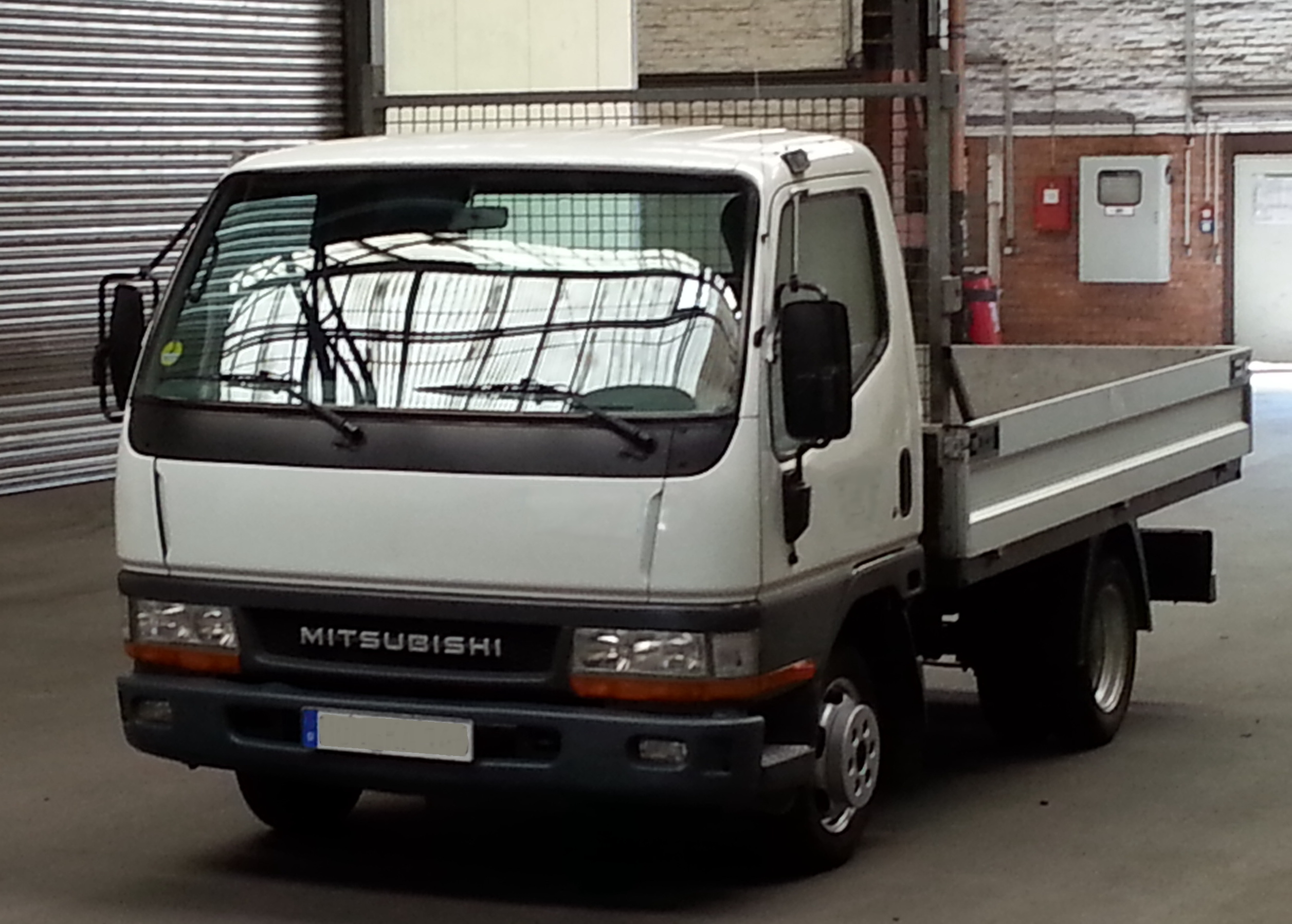
6th generation (latest version)

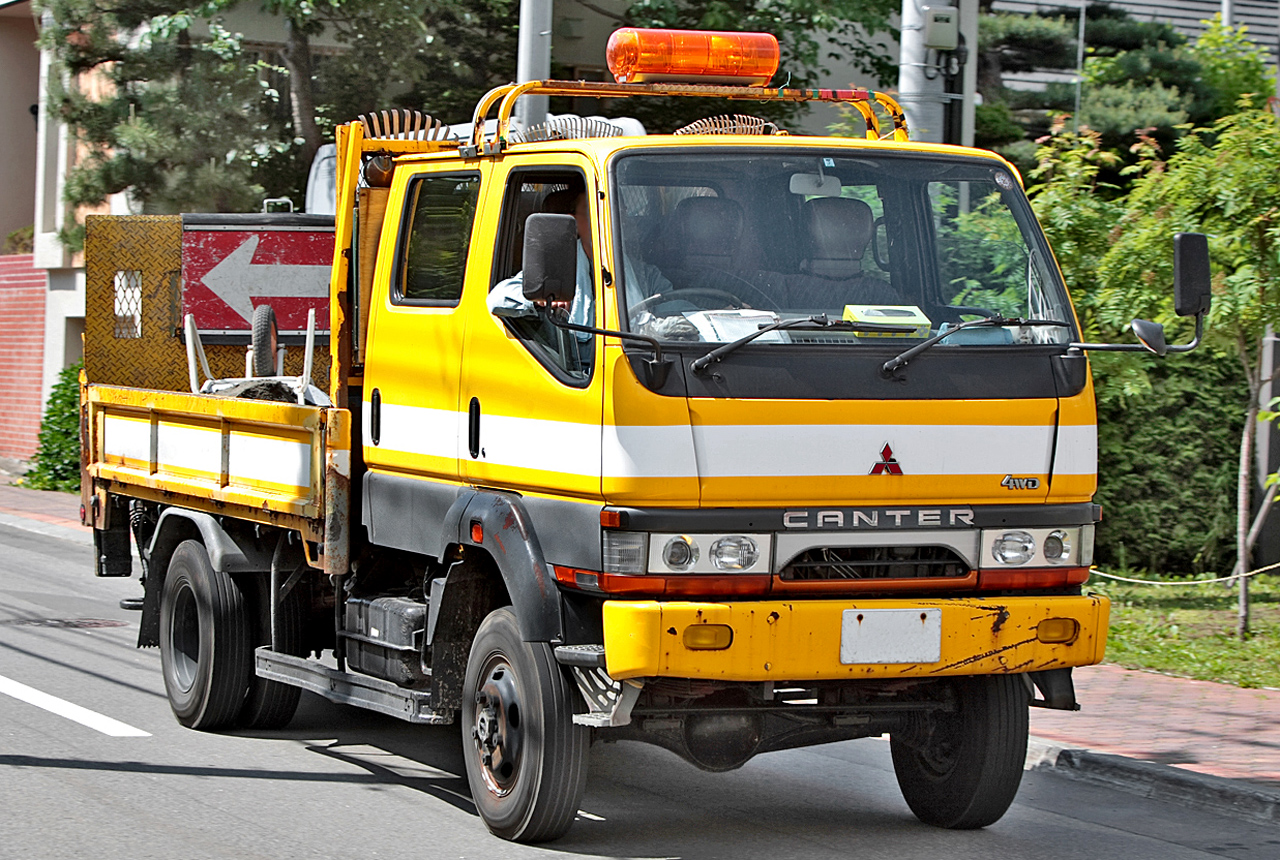
6th gen Fuso Canter Double cab 4x4 flatbed (early version)

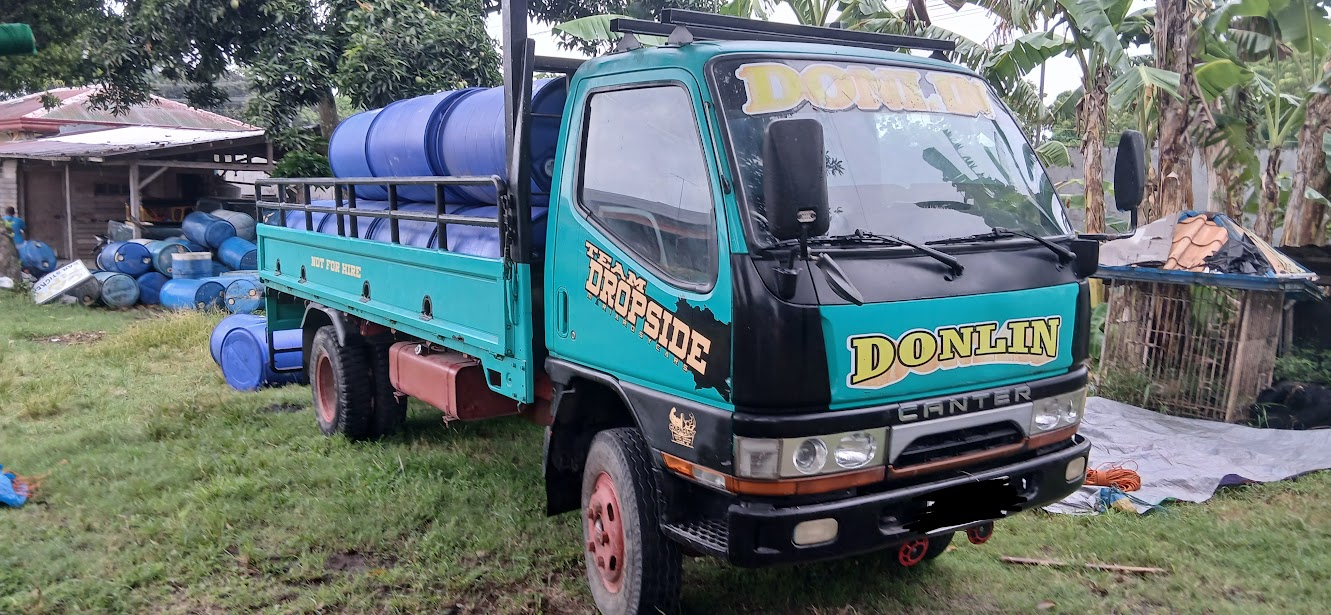
6th Generation Mitsubishi Fuso Canter Flatbed(Early Version)

| Model (Europe) | Canter 35 | | (Canter 55?) | Canter 60 | Canter 75 | (Canter 4x4?) |
|---|---|---|---|---|---|---|
| Also called | FB35 | FE35 | | FE60 | Canter HD | FG63 |
| Gross weight | 3.5 t | | 5.5 t | 6.0 – 6.3 t | 7.5 t | |
| Payload (estimated) | 1.5 t | | | 2.7 t | | |
| Engine (Europe) | 4M40/41/42 | | | 4D34 | | 4D33 |
| Transmission (standard) | 5-speed manual | | | | | |
| Fuel capacity | 100 L, 80 L with 2500 mm wheelbase | | | | | |

| Engine (Japan) | Prod.Run | Displacement | Power @ 1/min | Torque @ 1/min | Fuel system | Valve train | Aspiration |
|---|---|---|---|---|---|---|---|
| 4G63 | 6/97- | 1.997 L | 74 kW | | petrol with carburetor | OHC | natural |
| 4G64 | 2/96- | 2.351 L | 85 kW @ 5000 | | Otto with LPG | OHC | natural |
| | 9/97- | | | | Otto with CNG | OHC | natural |
| 4DR7 | -8/99~ | 2.835 L | | | Swirl combustion + In-line Injection pump | | natural |
| 4M40 | ~2/96-8/99 | 2.835 L | | | Swirl combustion + Rotary Injection pump | OHC | |
| 4D33 | | 4.214 L | | | Direct Injection + In-line Injection pump | OHV | natural |
| 4D35 | ~3/95-9/97~ | 4.560 L | | | | OHV | |
| 4D36 | -3/98~ | 3.567 L | 81 kW @ 3500 | | | OHV | |
| 4M50 | 10/97- | 4.899 L | | | Direct injection | DOHC | |
| 4M51 | ~7/98- | 5.240 L | | | | | |
Petrol engines, 4DR. and 4M40 were utilized on the lightest vehicles only. ~1990- resp. -2001~ means the engine was utilized "starting from 1990 or earlier" resp. "until 2001 or later", ~1995~ stands for "around 1995".

| Engine (Europe) | Prod.Run | Displacement | Power @ 1/min | Torque @ 1/min | Fuel System | Valve train | Aspiration | Emission class |
|---|---|---|---|---|---|---|---|---|
| 4M40 | -2/99 | 2.835 L | 69 kW | 191 Nm @ 2000 | Swirl combustion + Rotary Injection pump | OHC | | Euro II |
| 4M41 | 2/99-9/01 | 2.835 L | 85 kW | 216 Nm @ 2000 | Swirl combustion + Rotary Injection pump | OHC | Turbo + Intercooler | Euro II |
| 4M42-OAT | 9/01- | 2.977 L | 92 kW @ 3200 | 294 Nm @ 1800 | Direct Injection + Rotary Injection pump + EDC | DOHC | Turbo + Intercooler | Euro III |
| 4D34 | -2002 | 3.908 L | 100 kW | | Direct Injection + In-line Injection pump | OHV | Turbo + Intercooler | Euro II |
| 4D34 | 2002- | 3.908 L | 105 kW @ 2700 | 412 Nm @ 1600 | Direct Injection + In-line Injection pump | OHV | Turbo + Intercooler | Euro III |

=== Seventh generation (FE70/FE80) ===
The seventh generation of the Canter was introduced in Japan in June 2002, in Europe in 2005. Main goals were a modern vehicle, improved safety (new: disc brakes and Xenon head lights on some models) and comfort, e.g. the wide cabin became 20 mm higher and 100 mm lengthened to the front. For a more spacious cabin the shifting stick moved from between driver's and center seat to the dashboard, a world-first for cab-over trucks.

Until the end of production of the seventh generation the Canter was manufactured and sold in Japan without selective catalytic reduction. In Europe the engines of the predecessor continued to be used at first, succeeded by Mitsubishi engines with common rail injection and finally by a new generation of engines based on Fiat Powertrain Technologies' F1C engine. Starting with the eighth generation these "world engines" were also utilized in Japan and around the world for all developed countries with strict emissions standards; for less developed countries a simplified seventh generation remained in production in parallel as General Export Models.

During the DaimlerChrysler–Mitsubishi alliance, Fuso was hived off from MMC and when the alliance failed, the company remained with Daimler (at that time DCX). As new scandals, such as concealment of issues on car safety, came up again and again, Mitsubishi Fuso announced an internal audit and clean-up in 2004, including 43 recalls and 4 "improvement campaigns". The Canter's naming and badging was gradually changed during this period; the name changed from "Mitsubishi Canter" to "Mitsubishi Fuso Canter" on the seventh generation and then to "Fuso Canter" for the eighth generation; the diamond emblem design remained but was changed from red to silver.

This generation was introduced to Malaysia in 2010 and was discontinued in 2017.

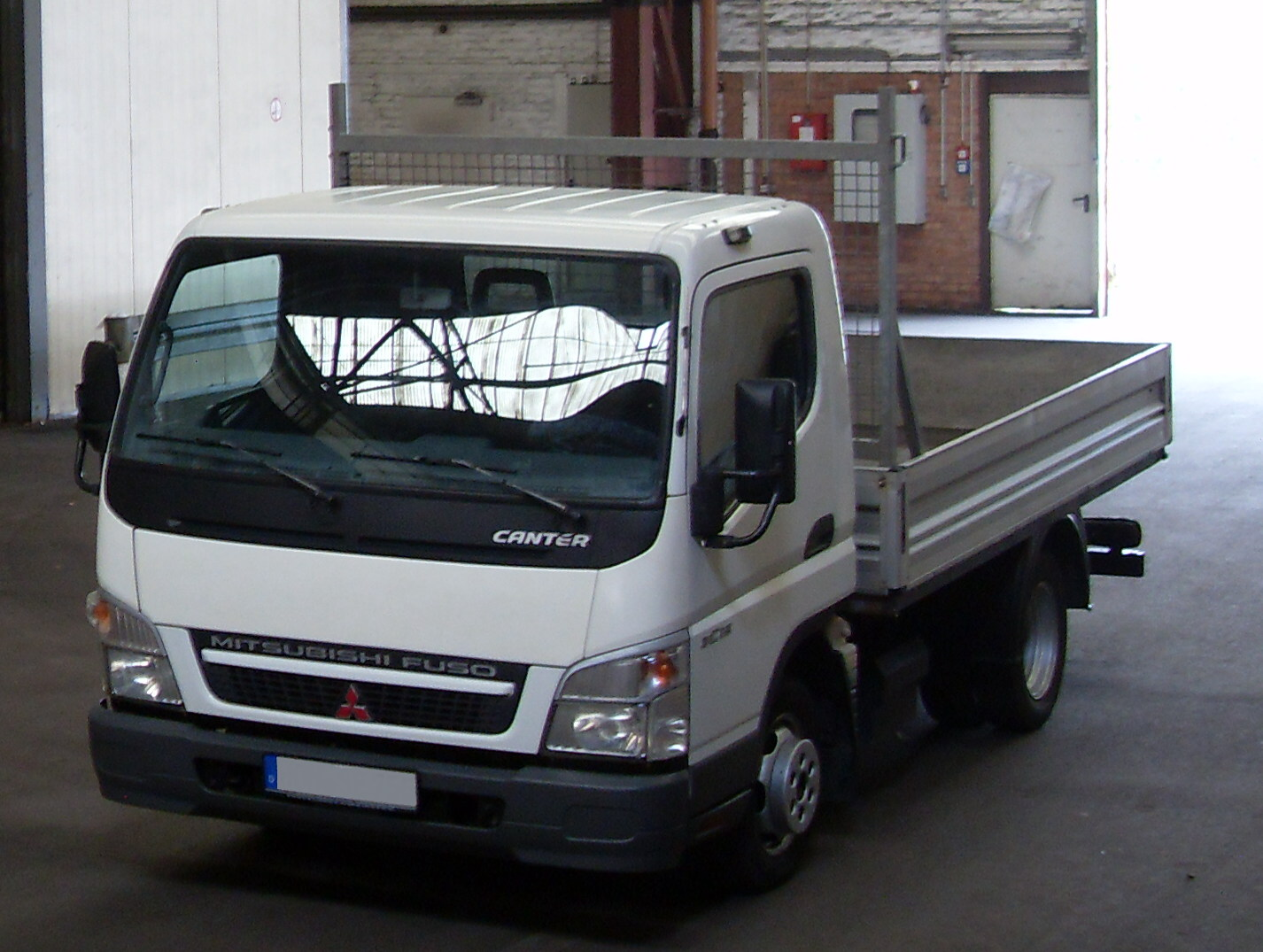
7th generation (2005-2009)

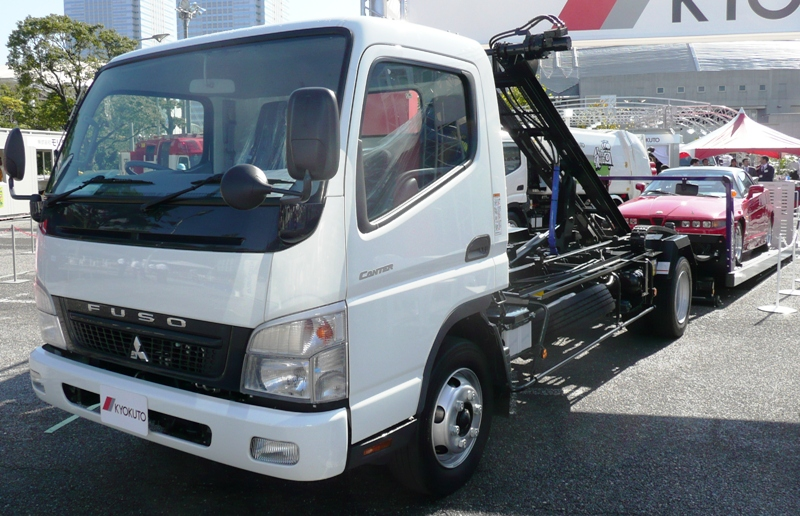
7th generation, Model FB (2009–2012)

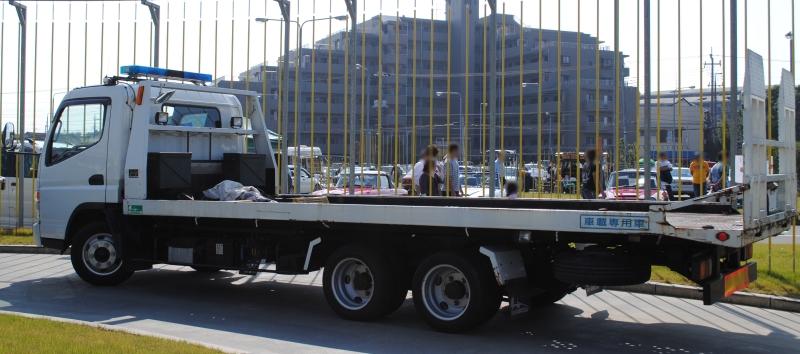
7th generation Canter with twin rear axles

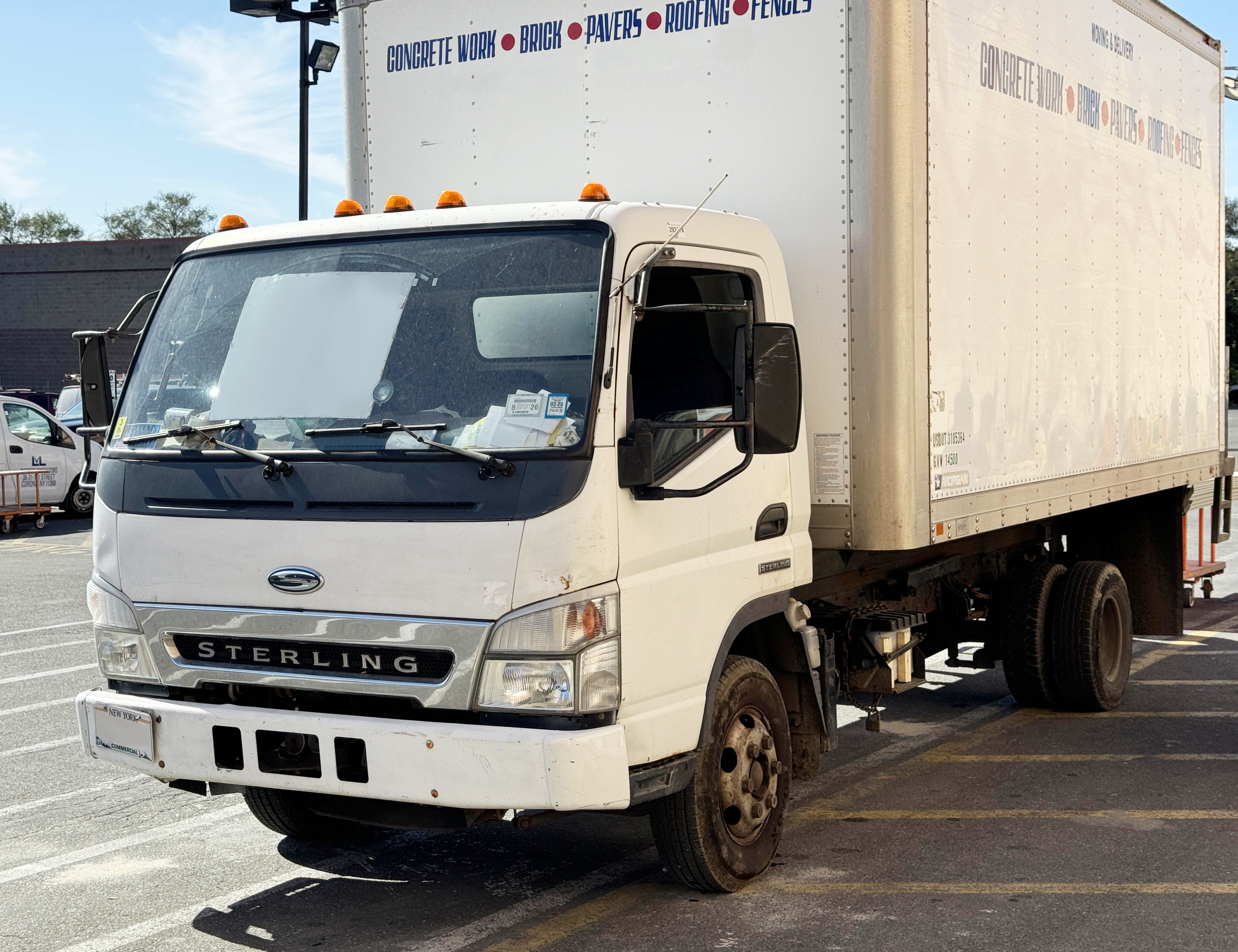
Sterling 360, a North American rebadge built for three years

==== Sterling 360 ====
Between April 2006 and March 2009 (when the brand was discontinued), the Canter was marketed as the Sterling 360 in North America. It was offered on five different wheelbases, with GVWRs ranging between 14,050 and 17,995 lb (6,373 and 8,162 kg), equipped with Fuso's 4M50, 4.9-liter turbodiesel engine producing 175 hp (130 kW).

| Model (Europe) | 3S13 | 5S13 | 3C13 3C15 | 6C14 6C15 • 6C18 | 7C14 7C15 • 7C18 | Pfau Rexter A6500 4x4 |
|---|---|---|---|---|---|---|
| also called | FE74? | FE74 | FE84 | FE85 | FE85 | |
| Cabin width | 1.7 m | 1.7 m | 2.0 m | 2.0 m | 2.0 m | 1.7 m |
| Gross weight | 3.5 t | 5.5 t | 3.5 t | 6.0 – 6.3 t | 7.5 t | 6.5 - 7 t |
| Payload (estimated) | | | | | 4.5 - 5.0 t | |
| Fuel capacity | 80 L | | | | | |
Model designations depended on the markets where sold, the European system indicated here appears to be the most expressive one: The leading digit indicates the (rounded) gross weight in tons, the following two digits stand for one tenth of the performance in horse power. The letter in-between represents the cabin width (S=Standard=Narrow, C=Comfort=Wide) while an attached D was presumably used for double cabin models. Pfau vehicles with narrow cabin including double cabin models have had gross weights ranging from 3.5 to 7.5 tons.

| Engine (Japan) | Production period | Displacement | Max Power | | | Max Torque | | | Fuel system | Valve train | Aspiration | Payload |
| Engine (Japan) | Production period | Displacement | PS | kW | /rpm | Nm | lbft | /rpm | Fuel system | Valve train | Aspiration | Payload |
|---|---|---|---|---|---|---|---|---|---|---|---|---|
| 4G63 | | 1,997 cc | 107 | 79 | 5,000 | 163 | 120 | 4,000 | petrol with MPI | OHC | natural | |
| 4M40 | | 2,835 cc | 140 | 103 | | | | | | | | |
| 4M42(T2) | | 2,977 cc | 125 | 92 | 3,200 | 294 | 217 | 1,700 | Direct Injection | | turbo IC | |
| 4M42(T3) | | 2,977 cc | 130 | 96 | 3,200 | 294 | 217 | 1,700 | Direct Injection | | turbo IC | |
| 4D33 | -11/04~ | 4,214 cc | 125 | 92 | 3,200 | 294 | 217 | 1,800 | Direct Injection + In-line Injection pump | OHV | natural | |
| 4M51 | -10/04~ | 5,249 cc | 140 | 103 | 3,200 | 333 | 246 | 1,600 | | | natural | |
| 4M50(T3) | 2/04- | 4,899 cc | 140 | 103 | 2,700 | 412 | 304 | 1,600 | Direct Injection | DOHC, 4V | | 2 t |
| 4M50(T4) | 2/04- | 4,899 cc | 150 | 110 | 2,700 | 441 | 325 | 1,600 | Direct Injection | DOHC, 4V | | 3 t |
| 4M50(T5) | 2/04- | 4,899 cc | 180 | 132 | 2,700 | 530 | 391 | 1,600 | Direct Injection | DOHC, 4V | | 3 t |
5-speed manual and 4-speed automatic transmissions ELC were available. The Guts has been (at least) announced to be available with engines running on LPG and LNG. Otto and 4M40 engines had been utilized for the lightest vehicles only. ~1990- resp. -2001~ means the engine was utilized "starting from 1990 or earlier" resp. "until 2001 or later", ~1995~ stands for "around 1995".

| Engine (Europe) | Production period | Displacement | Max Power | | | Max Torque | | | Fuel system | Valve train | Aspiration | Emission class |
| Engine (Europe) | Production period | Displacement | PS | kW | /rpm | Nm | lbft | /rpm | Fuel system | Valve train | Aspiration | Emission class |
|---|---|---|---|---|---|---|---|---|---|---|---|---|
| 4M42-OAT (..13) | -9/07 | 2,977 cc | 92 | 125 | 3,200 | 294 | 217 | 1,700 | Direct Injection + Rotary Injection pump + EDC | DOHC | Turbo + Intercooler | Euro III |
| 4M42-T2 (..13) | ~8/06-7/09~ | 2,977 cc | 92 | 125 | 3,200 | 294 | 217 | 1,700 | CR + Direct Injection | DOHC | VGT + Intercooler | Euro IV |
| 4M42-T? (..15) | ~10/06-7/09~ | 2,977 cc | 107 | 145 | 3,200 | 364 | 268 | 1,700 | CR+Direct Injection | DOHC | VGT + Intercooler | Euro IV |
| 4D34-2AT6 (..14) | -9/07 | 3,908 cc | 105 | 143 | 2,700 | 412 | 304 | 1,600 | Direct Injection + In-line Injection pump | OHV | Turbocharger + Intercooler | Euro III |
| 4M50 (..18) | ~4/07-9/09~ | 4,899 cc | 135 | 184 | | | | | DOHC | | Euro IV | |
| 4P10-T2 (..13) | ~5/10- | 2,998 cc | 96 | 131 | 3,500 | 300 | 221 | 1,300 | CR+Direct Injection | DOHC | VGT + Intercooler | EEV with SCR |
| 4P10-T4 (..15) | ~5/10- | 2,998 cc | 110 | 150 | 3,500 | 370 | 273 | 1,600 | CR+Direct Injection | DOHC | VGT + Intercooler | EEV with SCR |
| 4P10-T6 (..18) | ~5/10- | 2,998 cc | 129 | 175 | 3,500 | 430 | 317 | 1,600 | CR+Direct Injection | DOHC | VGT + Intercooler | EEV with SCR |
5-speed and 6-speed manual, as well as the Duonic® 6-speed DCT (on 4P10 engines only) were available. ~1990- resp. -2001~ means the engine was utilized "starting from 1990 or earlier" resp. "until 2001 or later", ~1995~ stands for "around 1995". Figures in brackets, e.g. (..13), represent a tenth of the horse power und relate to the naming practice seen in the above listing of European market models.

=== Eighth generation ===
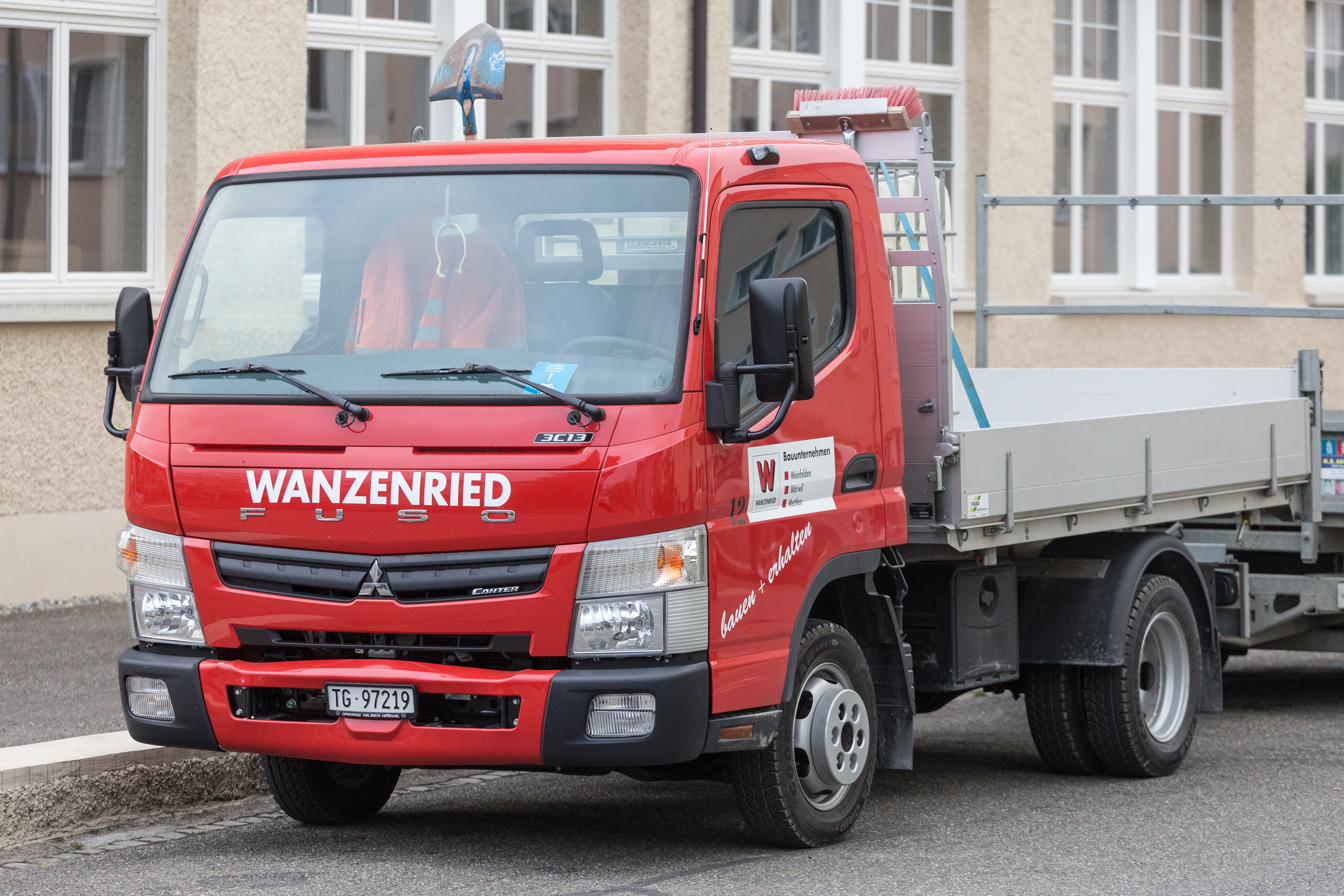
Fuso Canter 3C13, 8th generation, 3.5 tons

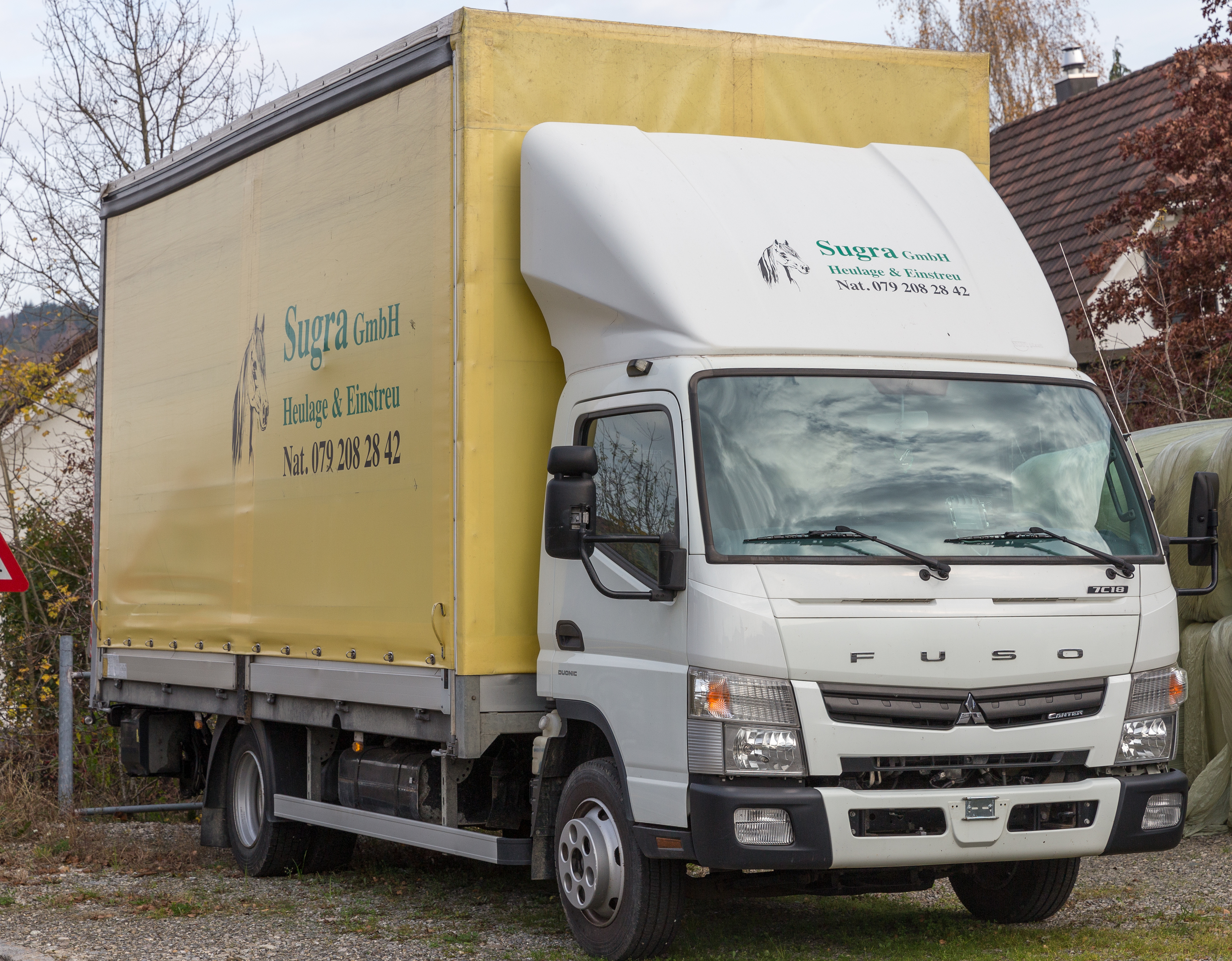
Fuso Canter 7C18, 8th generation, 7.5 tons

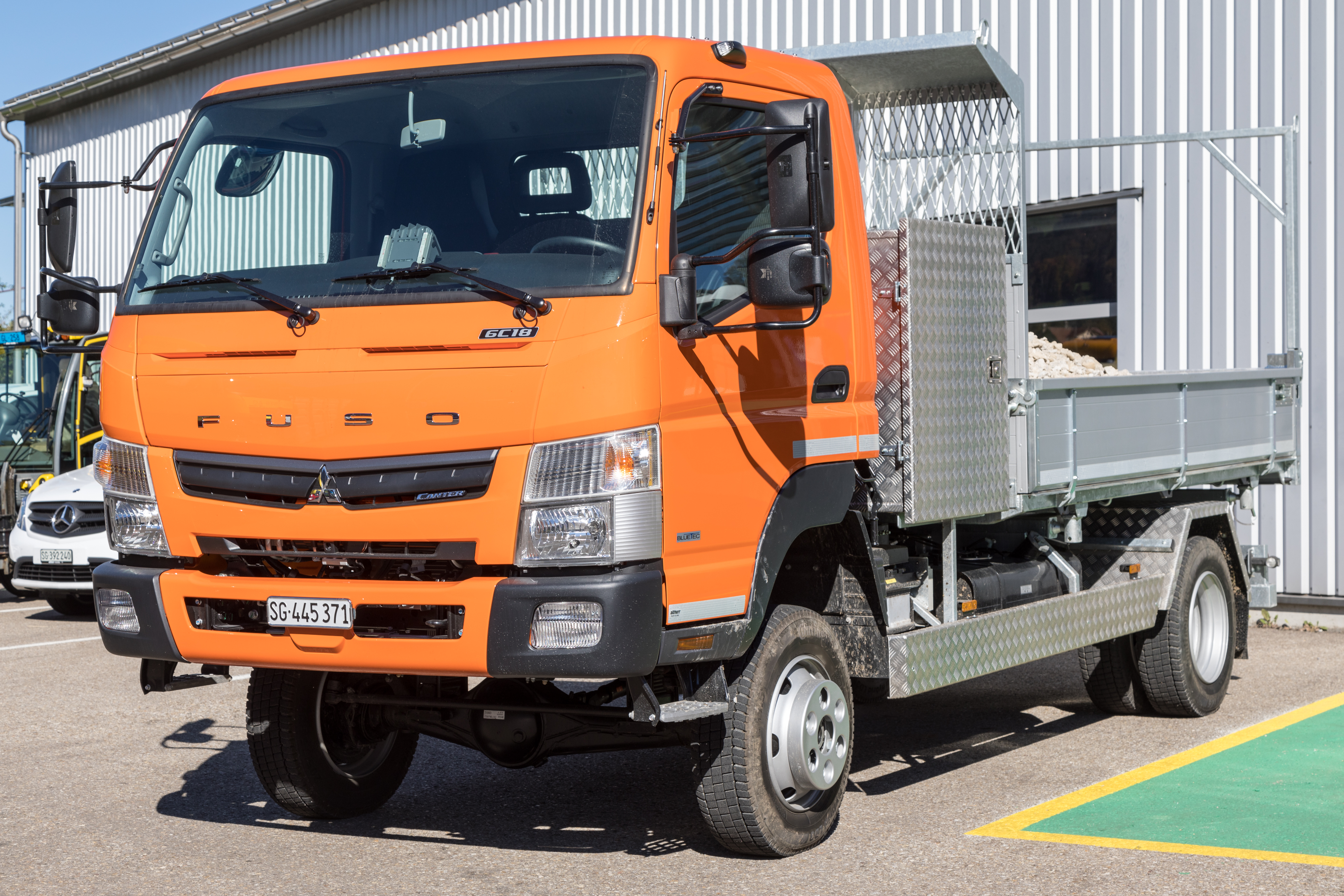
Fuso Canter 6C18 4x4

The eighth generation was first introduced in Japan in November 2010, sales started in Europe in 2012. At least in Europe this Canter also succeeds the Mercedes-Benz Vario since its discontinuation in 2013. In Malaysia, this generation was introduced in 2017 and is still in production.

The line-up includes chassis weighing from 3.5 to 8.55 tons gross with cabins 1.7 (S) or 2.0 (W) metres wide. Canters with 5 tons (gross) or less have front axles with independent suspension; selected variants are available with crew cabin (D = Double cabin). Generally, offerings depend widely on the country: there are no standard (narrow) cabins in the USA nor the U.K. and no standard (narrow) double cabins in Europe. In Australia a 3S13 (locally called 313 City) with reduced cabin height is available. Some bodies for the trucks are available ex works (Europe: drop-side and dumper beds, additionally in Japan: D-van, D-wing and reefer boxes, skip and car carriers).

The "world engines" ranging from 96 to 129 kW (131 to 175 hp) introduced in Europe with the seventh generation are now utilized worldwide paired to a manual five-speed transmission, the 6-speed Duonic Dual-clutch transmission is an option for many variants and a PTO is available with both gearboxes. On the Eco-Hybrid a 110 kW (150 hp) diesel engine is combined with a 40 kW electric motor-generator and a 2 kWh lithium-ion battery. Since 2019 the General Export Model is based on the 8th generation, but is fitted with simpler 4V21 engines which are Euro IV compliant only. In late 2017, the first pure electric eCanter was delivered to its customer in New York City. This was the first time the "Canter" designation has been used in North America. Daimler Trucks will also sell the eCanter under the RIZON Truck brand in North America. Some 500 eCanters were planned for assembly as forerunners to be replaced by mass production starting in 2019.

On October 19, 2020, Fuso introduced a facelifted version of the Canter in Japan. The new line-up includes 1.5 ton payload variants to comply with the Japanese class of compact vehicles/trucks, incorporating the former Canter Guts. Improved engines had already been phased-in in early 2020 offering reduced fuel consumption and exhaust emissions while torque was improved. The engine designation was changed from 4P10 to 4P10+ to underline these innovations.

| Model | 3S13 • 3S15 • 6S15 | 3C13(D) • 3C15(D) • 3C18 | 7C15(D) • 7C18(D) • 9C18 | 6C18(D) 4x4 | 7C15 Eco-Hybrid |
| Cabin width | 1.7 m | 2.0 m | 2.0 m | 2.0 m | 2.0 m |
| Gross weight | 3.5/6.0 t | 3.5 t | 7.5/8.55 t | 6.5 t | 7.5 t |
| Max. load of chassis | 1.5 t | 1.5 t | 4.5 - 6 t | 3.5 t | 4.8 t |
| Wheelbase | 2500 – 3400 mm | 2500 – 3850 mm | 2800 – 4750 mm | 3415 – 3865 mm | 3400 – 3850 mm |
| Fuel capacity | 70 L | 70 L | 100 L | 100 L | 100 L |
Model designations depend largely on the markets where sold. The European system indicated here appears to be most expressive (also utilized in Australia and New Zealand in a slightly different way).: The leading digit indicates the (rounded) gross weight in tons.; The letter in-between represents the cabin width (S=Standard, C=Comfort=Wide).; The following two digits stand for one tenth of the performance in horse power.; An attached (D) is used for double cabin models.

| Engine | Displacement | Power @ 1/min | Torque @ 1/min | Remarks |
|---|---|---|---|---|
| 4P10-T1 | 2.998 L | 81 kW @ 2130 | 430 Nm @ 1600 | Japan (2020) |
| 4P10-T2 | 2.998 L | 96 kW @ 3500 | 300 Nm @ 1300 | |
| 4P10-T2 | 2.998 L | 96 kW @ 2130 | 430 Nm @ 1600–2130 | Japan (2020) |
| 4P10-T4 | 2.998 L | 110 kW @ 2840–3500 | 370 Nm @ 1320–2840 | |
| 4P10-T4 | 2.998 L | 110 kW @ 2440 | 430 Nm @ 1600–2440 | Japan (2020) |
| 4P10-T5 | 2.998 L | 120 kW @ 3400 | 370 Nm @ 1300 | NAFTA/USA |
| 4P10-T6 | 2.998 L | 129 kW @ 2860–3500 | 430 Nm @ 1600–2860 | |
| 4P10-T6 | 2.998 L | 129 kW @ 2860 | 430 Nm @ 1600–2860 | Japan (2020) |
| GM V8 | 6.0 L | 297 hp (221 kW) | 361 lb⋅ft (489 N⋅m) | NAFTA/USA |

== Derivatives ==
=== All-wheel drive ===
Since its fifth generation Fuso offered the Canter with all-wheel drive in Japan and probably some export markets. In Europe all-wheel drive became available to selected customers by Pfau in Springe, Germany (since 2016 insolvent) with the seventh generation as standard (narrow) vehicles with 3.5 to 7.5 tons. For the eighth generation Pfau have also offered standard and wide vehicles with 5.5 to 7 tons GVW with all-wheel drive, despite the official European Canter programme only including a 6.5 tons all-wheel drive vehicle. On the eighth generation standard (narrow) cabins have a permanent all-wheel drive without crawling gear while wide cabin trucks feature a rigid front axle and part-time all-wheel drive with raised frame to improve ground clearance resp. approach angles.

=== Canter Guts ===
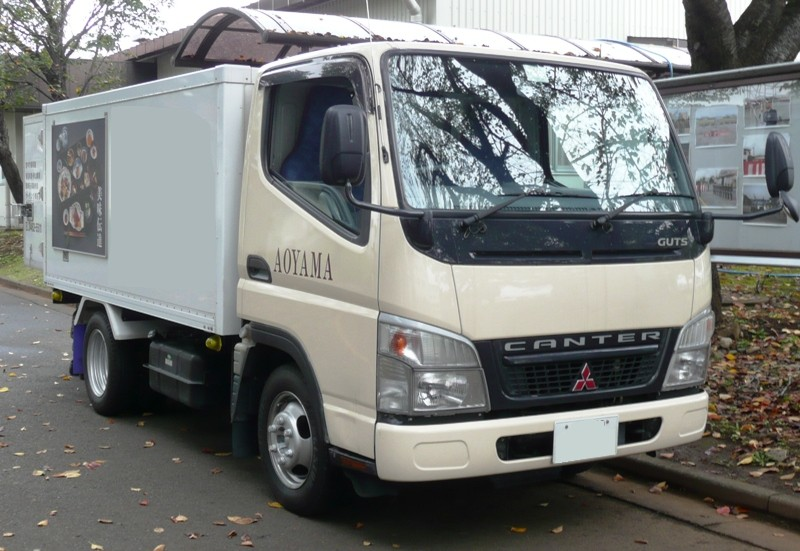
Fuso Canter Guts 7th generation

Guts was the denomination for a JDM variant of the Canter in Japan from 1987 through 2008 having a standard narrow cabin and slightly more than 3.5 tons gross weight.

In 2008 the Guts based on the seventh generation was discontinued but in January 2013 the same label was reinvented following an agreement in late 2012 between Daimler/Fuso and Renault-Nissan to supply each other with certain products, mainly on the Japanese market. Nissan markets the Canter with 2 tons payload or more as a Nissan NT450 Atlas (H44), while Fusō offers a revised variant of the Nissan NT400 (F24) as Canter Guts to fit the Japanese class of compact vehicles.

- Payload limited to 1.5 tons, minimum is 1.15 tons depending on the variant,
- gross weight slightly more than 3.5 tons,
- width reduced to 1.69 m from 1.87 m,
- height reduced to 1.99 m from 2.135 m,
- max. length limited to 4.69 m instead of 4.75 to 6.25 m in Europe,
- ZD30 engine reduced to 81 kW,
- manual 5-speed transmission instead of six speeds,
- various bed heights including reduced tire dimensions on the (driven) rear axle for the low bed variants.

The Canter Guts is powered either by a Nissan ZD30DDTI diesel engine having 81 kW (110 PS) at 2800 rpm and 276 N⋅m (204 lb⋅ft) at 1260-2800 rpm or by a petrol engine with a manual 5-speed transmission with overdrive and rear-wheel drive. Options include permanent all-wheel drive and a double cabin. As usual with the other smaller trucks it features independent front suspension.

End of 2019 production of the Nissan NT400 (F24) had been ceased, in early 2020 a rebadged Isuzu Elf has been presented as the new Nissan NT400 (F25). On October 19, 2020, Fuso launched the ninth generation Canter in Japan which now includes variants conforming to the class of compact vehicles. But the Guts label appears no to be utilized any more.

=== General Export Model ===
Continuously stricter exhaust gas limits resulted in raising production cost and complexity, e.g. Common rail injection and exhaust gas aftertreatment. Thus, for less developed countries simplified vehicles with the old Mitsubishi engines and manual 5-speed transmissions (the biggest engine without synchromesh for lowest and reverse gear) were introduced. These General Export Models base on the seventh generation Canter, engines comply to EURO II and were sold in parallel to the eighth generation until 2019. Since early 2018 they were offered in the Philippines with more modern Mitsubishi engines conforming to Euro IV. In 2019 these vehicles were replaced once more by simplified variants of the eighth generation again equipped with outfashioned Mitsubishi engines (4V21) conforming to EURO IV instead of EURO VI for the FPT engines utilized on the standard eighth generation.

=== Eco-Hybrid ===
Late 2005, the first generation of the "Canter Eco-Hybrid" based on the seventh generation Canter became commercially available in Japan. With a curb weight of 2.83 tons it featured 2 tons of payload, with 3 tons payload the curb weight was slightly higher at 2.87 tons.

The "Eco-Hybrid" based on the eighth generation is a wide 7.5 ton vehicle equipped with a 110 kW diesel engine with Duonic® automated mechanical transmission, 40 kW motor/generator located between engine and transmission and a 2 kWh lithium-ion battery. This parallel hybrid system facilitates 20% lower fuel consumption.

=== eCanter ===
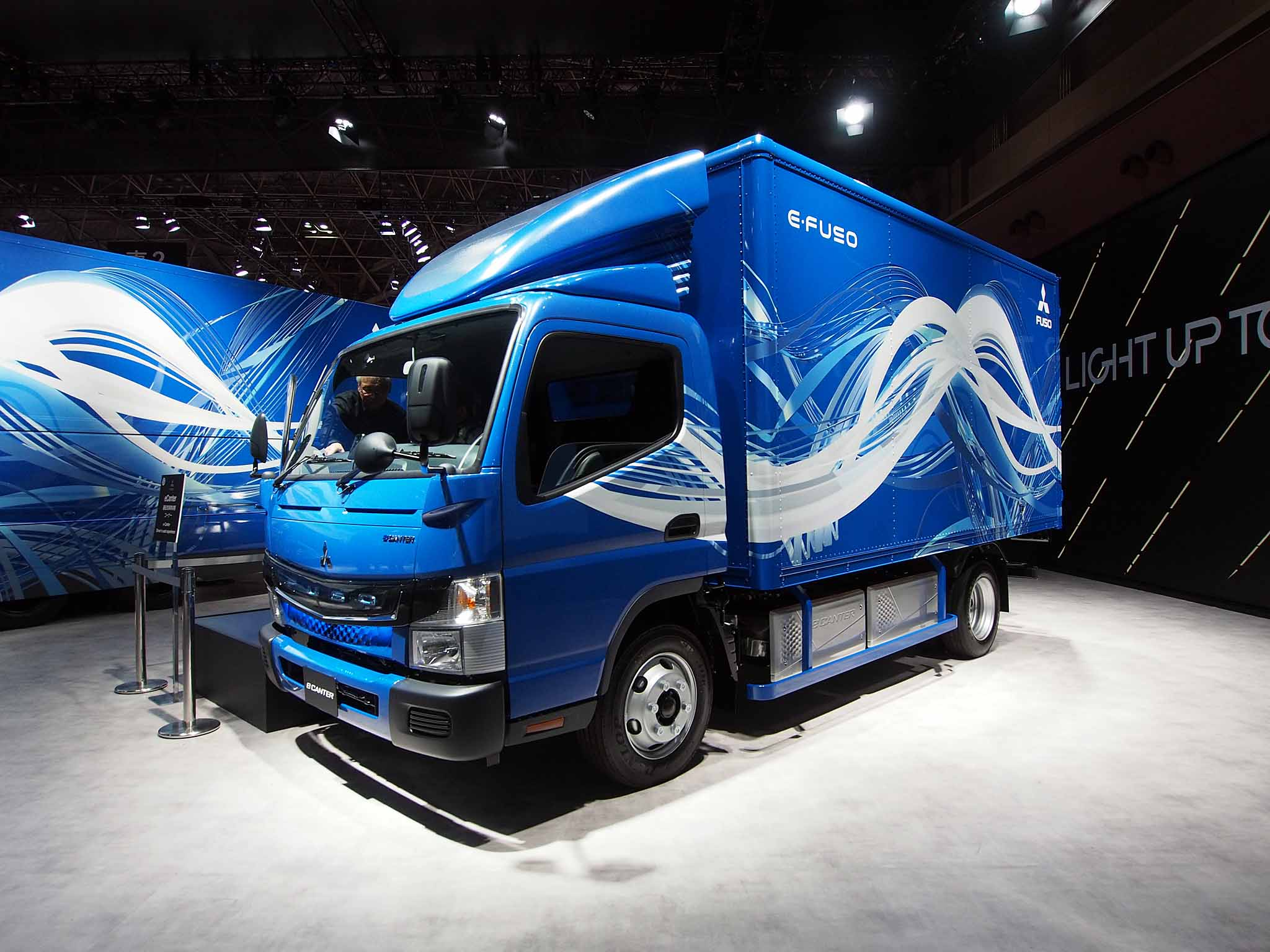
Fuso eCanter

The fully developed eCanter was launched in New York City in September 2017 and is scheduled for delivery in Japan, Europe and North America. It will also be sold under the RIZON brand in the North American market

=== CanterVan ===
In 2014 the co-operation between Fuso and Nissan has been extended, on some markets the Nissan NV350 is marketed by Fusō as CanterVan since then.

=== Buses ===
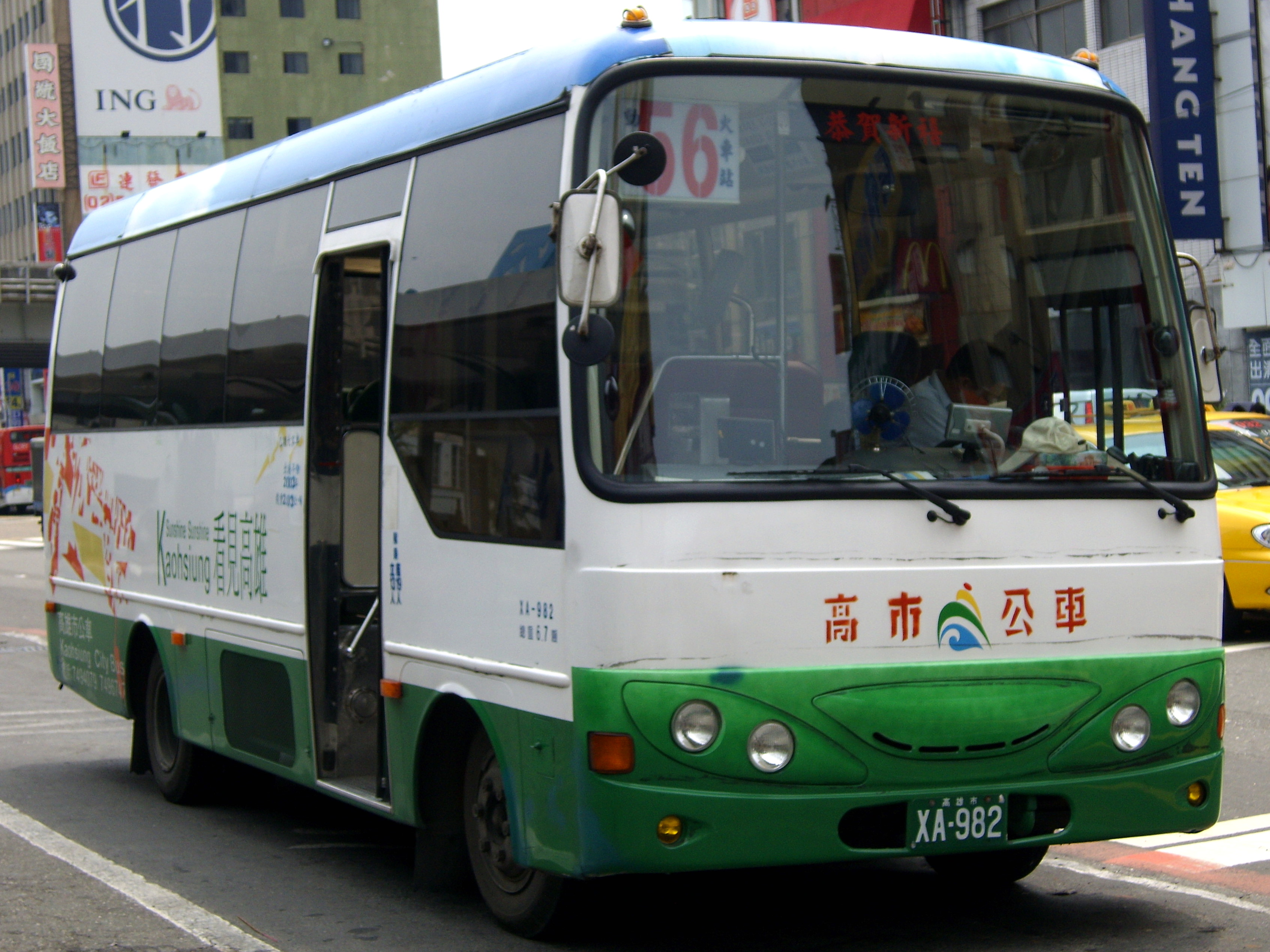
A 6th generation Canter chassied bus in Taiwan

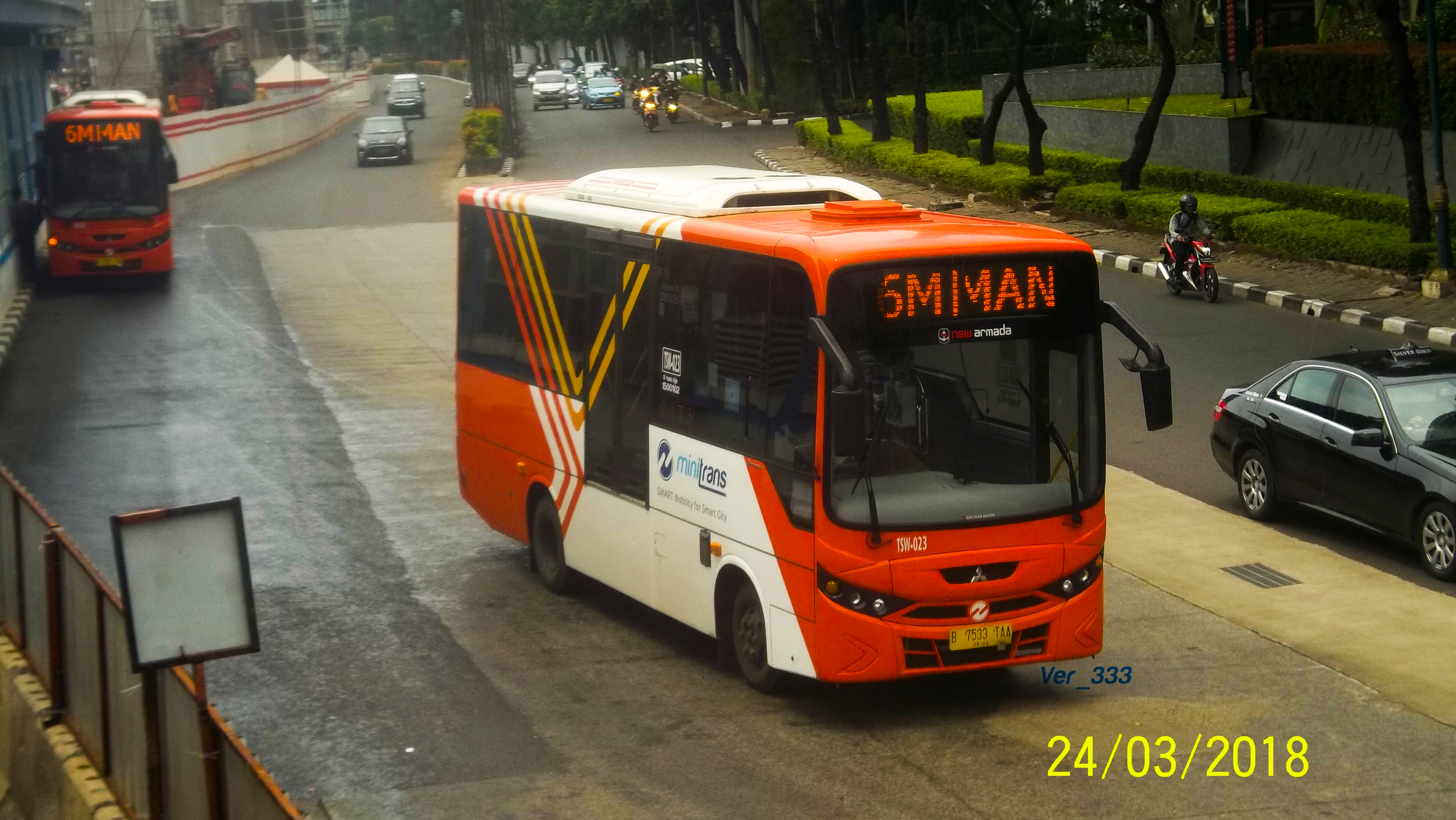
A converted FE84 Canter for Minitrans feeder buses in Indonesia

Several bus conversions exist based on Canter chassis including the factory made Fuso Rosa. In many countries locally made buses are a means to circumvent high import duties. In some cases under licence locally made chassis with outdated engines conforming to less strict emission standards allow for even lower prices. In Indonesia, some of the seventh-generation Canter FE84 are converted to Transjakarta Minitrans feeder buses by New Armada Carroserie.

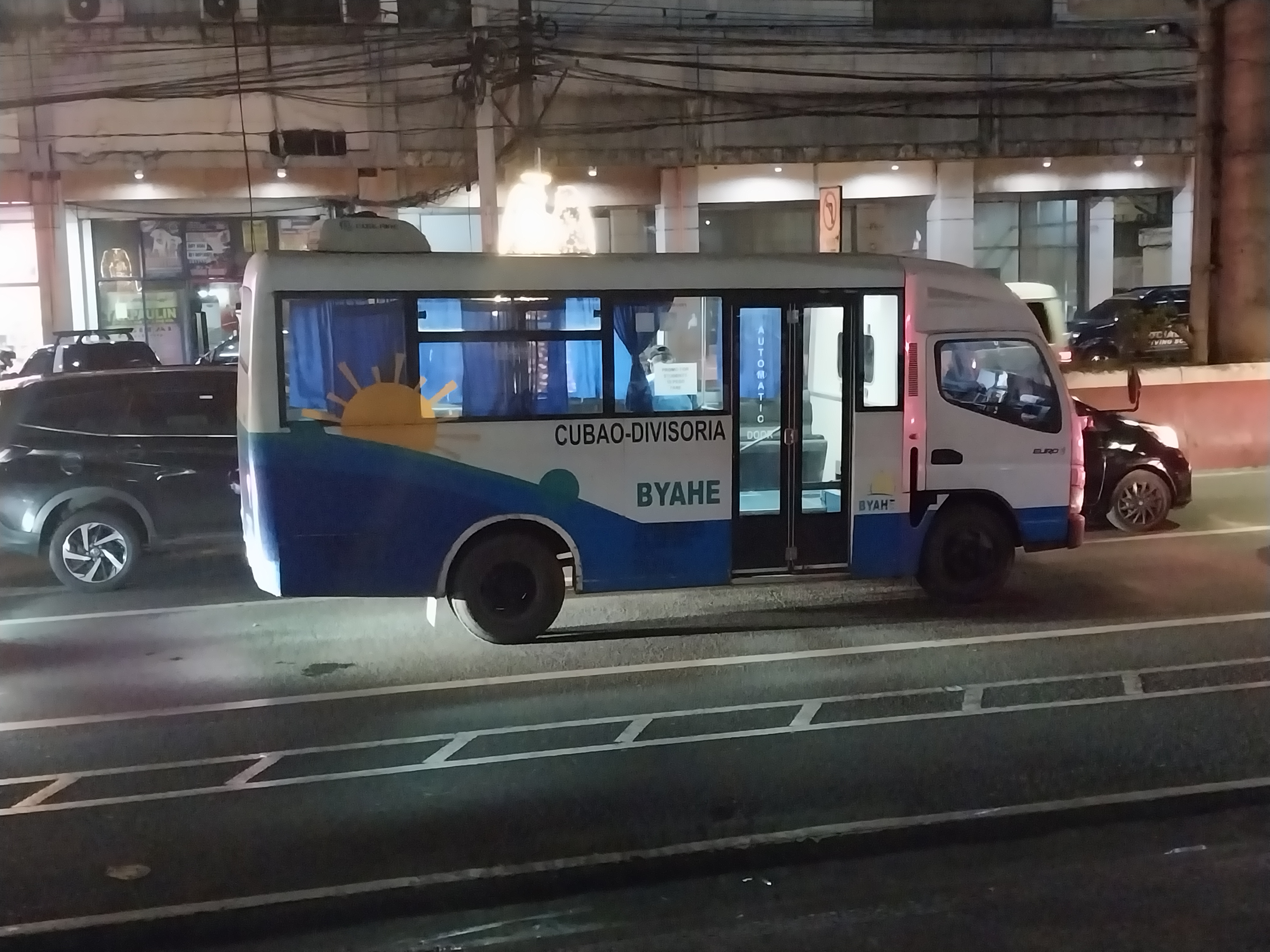
Almazora bodied Canter, used as minibus.

In the Philippines, the Canter Commute, and Canter Express are locally built minibus conversions of the Canter, with a coach-built body, and an aerodynamic fairing applied to the truck’s cab, resulting in a streamlined appearance.

== Models and Model codes ==
Early models utilized the coeval T coding system to distinguish the different versions of trucks, chassis and buses. Starting with the fourth generation it was replaced by the F codes for the same purpose. Over time this in turn has been adapted to newer developments of the product itself. Furthermore, it can easily be confused with some sales denominations in some markets at a given time, e.g. a FC35 decodes as a 3.5 tons (gross) gasoline Canter and the numerical part of the North American FE130 decodes as its gross weight in hectopounds.

=== Japan ===
- FB Canter Guts Diesel
- FD Canter Guts Diesel 4WD
- FE
- FF Tri-axle (7th generation only)
- FG 4WD

=== North America ===
In the mid-1980s Fuso (MMC at that time) started selling the Canter in the USA, originally as the FE. In certain years there was also a medium-duty (Class 7) FH series available which essentially was a Mitsubishi Fuso Fighter Mignon which because of its cabin was grouped as a Canter for Export. In the 2000s the Canter was also sold by Sterling Trucks with "Sterling 360" badging. The Canter nameplate was not used in North America until 2012.

In the United States the eighth generation was offered as FE/FG series (class 3 to 5). Since March 2018, specifically for North America the "Gas Truck" was created featuring the 6.0 Liter GM Vortec V8 small-block engine and an Allison Automatic. It was produced at Freightliner in Gaffney/SC, USA. The all-wheel driven FG series had been discontinued in about 2019, and on May 27, 2020, Mitsubishi Fuso Truck of America announced to cease sales of the Canter in the US and Canada.

In North America the designation had been used on the pure electric eCanter for the first time starting with the first delivery in New York City towards the end of 2017. Some 500 eCanters were planned for pre-production assembly as forerunners to mass production starting in 2019.

=== Europe ===
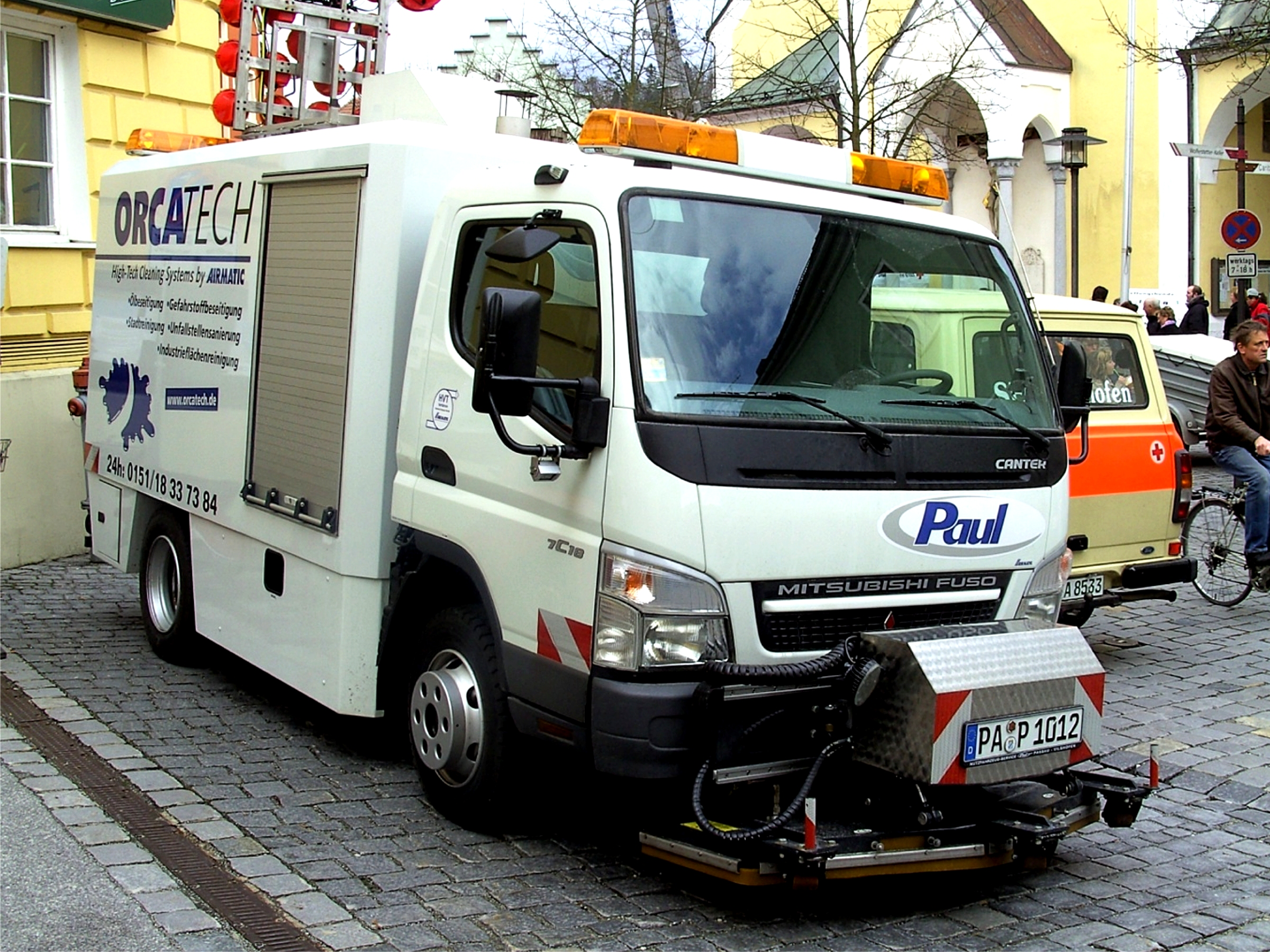
Fuso Canter 7th generation in Europe

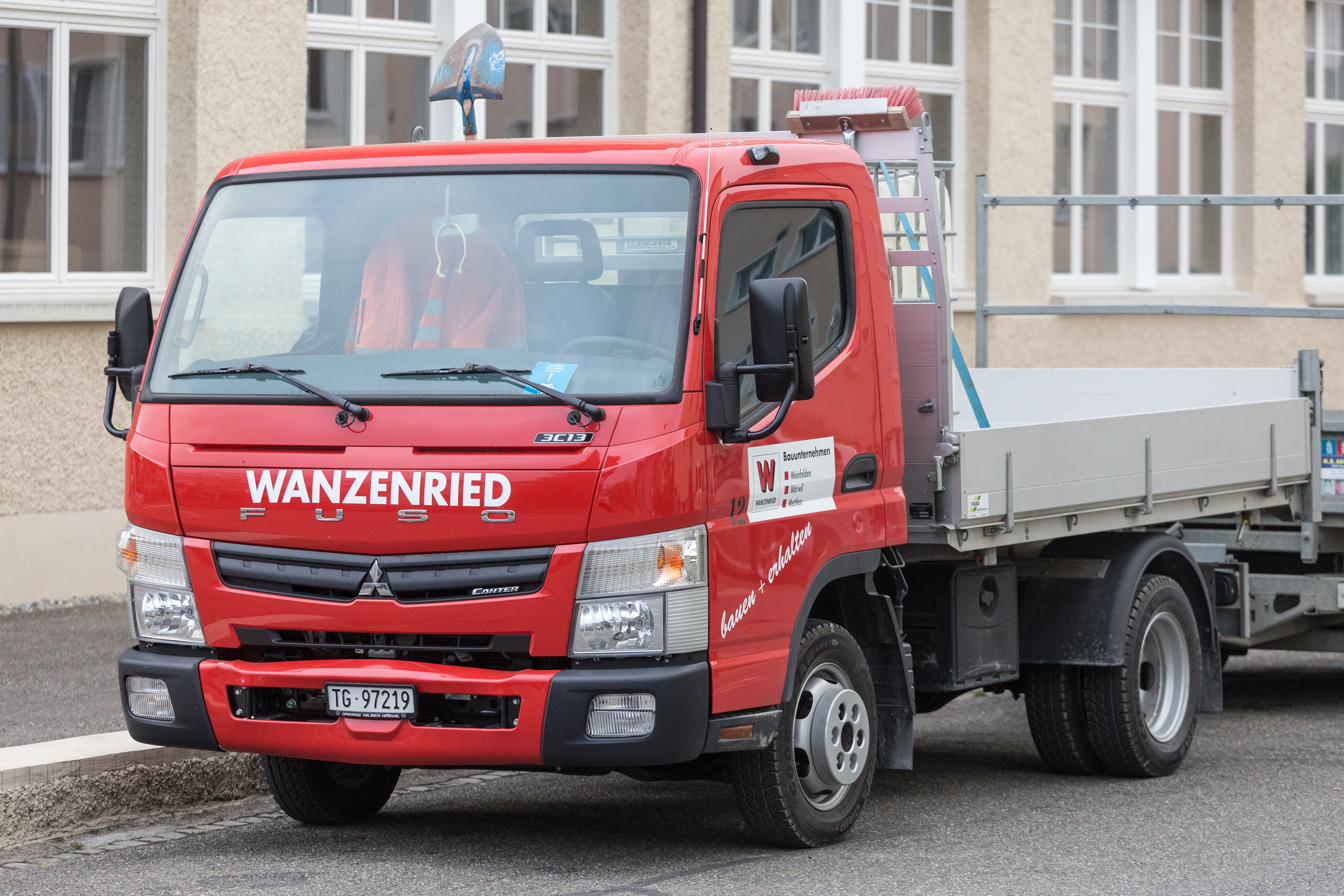
Fuso Canter 3C13 8th generation in Switzerland

With the fourth generation, sales began in the Benelux countries, and in 1980, local production started in Portugal on a regular basis. Sales designations and programme vary depending on time and country, e.g. no standard/narrow cabins in the U.K.

Due to declining sales resulting from new European driving licences for cars being restricted to 3.5 tons since 1998 the eighth generation 5 to 6 ton Canters are no more available except the 6.5 ton 4x4 and the 6-tonner as being the heaviest standard/narrow cabin Canter.

=== Turkey ===
Produced by Temsa. Over 3500 kg GVWR chassis is also basis of Temsa Prestij light midibus.

Pre-Euro models (1986 - 1997):

- FE 304 (3500 kg, narrow cab, single wheel only)
- FE 404 (3500 kg, wide cab)
- FE 444 (6500 kg, wide cab with 5-lug wheels, replaced with 6-lug FE 449)

Euro 2 to Euro 4 models (1998 - 2012):

- FE 511 (3500 kg, narrow cab, optional dual rear wheels, replaced with FE 711)
- FE 515 and FE 519 (3500 kg, narrow cab, long wheelbase)
- FE 730 (3500 kg, narrow cab, long wheelbase)
- FE 639 (3500 kg, wide cab, replaced with FE 839)
- FE 659 (6500 kg, wide cab with long wheelbase option, replaced with FE 859)

Euro 5 and Euro 6 models (2012 - ):

- TF A35 (3500 kg, narrow cab) - (phased out)
  - TF A35L (3500 kg, narrow cab, long wheelbase) (phased out)
- TF B35 (3500 kg, wide cab), -(replaced with 3.5B)
- TF B75 (7500 kg, wide cab), -(replaced with 8B)
  - TF B75L (7500 kg, wide cab, long wheelbase) -(replaced with 8BL with crew cab option)
- TF B85 (8550 kg, wide cab) - (replaced with 9B with 9BL long and 9BXL extra long wheelbase options)

Duonic dual clutch transmission is optional for over 3500 kg models unless stated otherwise.

=== New Zealand ===
- Canter FB, FE, FH
  - 2.0T FE130C1 Super Low
  - 2.0T FE150C1 Wide cab
  - 2.0T FE150E1 Wide Cab
  - 2.5T FG145C1 4x4
  - 3.5T FE150E2 Wide cab
  - 3.5T FE150W1 Double Cab
  - 4.0T FE150G1 Wide Cab
  - 4.5T FE150G2 Heavy Duty Wide Frame

=== Australia ===
All models available with either manual or duonic (dual clutch AMT) transmission, unless stated otherwise.

- 4x2 Range
  - 413 City (Narrow) Cab SWB
  - 515 City (Narrow) Cab SWB/MWB (Duonic only)
  - 515 City (Narrow) Super Low (low roof model)
  - 515 Wide Cab SWB/MWB
  - 615 Wide Cab MWB/LWB
  - 815 Wide Cab MWB/LWB
  - 918 Wide Cab MWB/LWB/XLWB/XXLWB
- Eco Hybrid Range
  - 815 Eco-Hybrid Wide Cab MWB/LWB (Duonic only)
- Tipper Range
  - 515 City (Narrow) Cab Tipper SWB
  - 715 Wide Cab Tipper SWB
- Crew Cab Range
  - 515 City (Narrow) Crew Cab MWB (Duonic only)
  - 815 Wide Crew Cab MWB (Duonic only)
  - 918 Wide Crew Cab MWB/LWB/XLWB
- 4x4 Range
  - 715 Wide Cab MWB (Manual only)
  - 715 Wide Crew Cab MWB (Manual only)

=== Indonesia ===
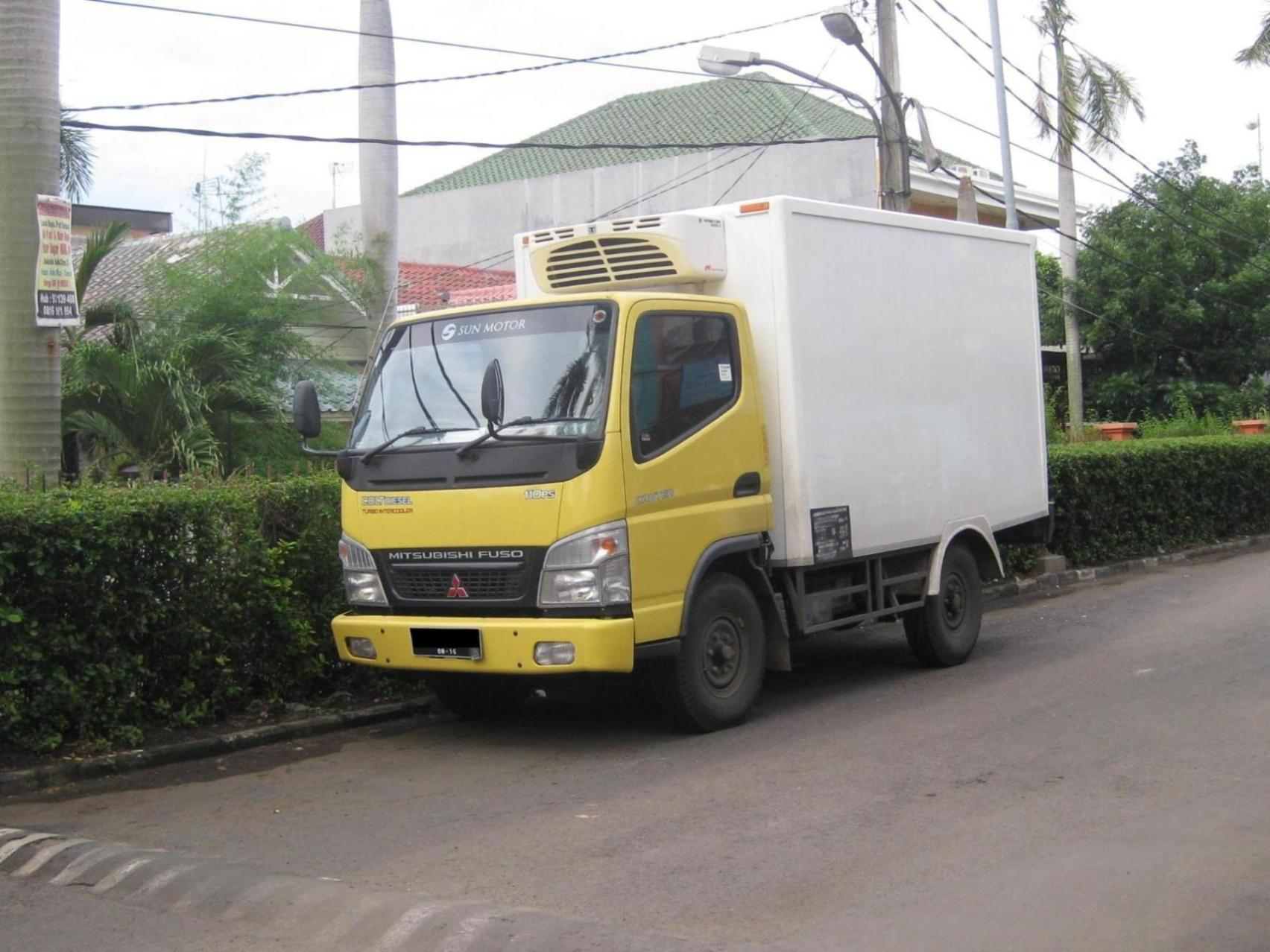
7th generation Canter / Colt Diesel (FE71) Refrigerated Box in Indonesia

In Indonesia, the locally assembled Mitsubishi Fuso Canter was marketed as Colt Diesel until 2022, when the "Canter" nameplate replaced it since then.

- 4-wheel
  - FE71
  - FE71 SUPER CAPACITY
- 6-wheel
  - FE73
  - FE73 SUPER POWER
  - FE74
  - FE74 SUPER SPEED
  - FE74 SUPER POWER
  - FE75
  - FE75 SUPER POWER
  - FE84
  - FE84 SUPER CAPACITY AND SUPER POWER

=== Philippines ===
- Canter
  - FE71
  - FE73
  - FE84
  - FE85

=== Iran ===
Mayan Foolad is the official distributor of Mitsubishi Fuso in Iran, and has started its activities since 2016. Canter models to be supplied are FEA51, FEB71CL, FEC71GL and FECX1. Units are all supplied from the Tramagal factory in Portugal. All units are to European specifications and are tested and homologated based on Iranian environment, fuel and topography and are exclusively designed for the Iranian market. All units are supplied with Euro V standard and DPF filter is included in all models. Delivery to customers started in January 2016, and the Canter is to be assembled in Iran from 2017.

=== Model codes explained ===
1. 2nd digit A to D refer to 1.5 ton payload trucks only and 2nd digit G only for 4-wheel drive only
2. 4th digit is questionable, e.g. a FE71 in Indonesia has a much higher payload (some 20%) compared to the Philippines.
3. 5th digit. Given this coding system is universal (as it appears here) where are the codes for older or gas engines, where is the room in this system to give them codes. Why are some engines mentioned twice? This explanation appears to be fairly correct for the 7th generation but no more.
4. 6th digit: What about a wheel base of 3460mm as seen on the Philippines FG83
5. 7th digit as a numerical code are most common, they represent chassis cabs, but what do the different numbers mean?

Each Mitsubishi Fuso Canter model code has an average of 4-5 alpha-numeric base model code. Each letter and number corresponds to a particular distinguishing feature.

- 1st Digit: "F" stands for Fuso Truck and "B" stands for Bus
- 2nd Digit:
  - A = Petrol 2 Wheel Drive
  - B = Diesel 2 Wheel Drive
  - C = Petrol 4 Wheel Drive
  - D = Diesel 4 Wheel Drive
  - E = Rear Wheel Drive (4 x 2)
  - F = Read Axle Vehicle (6 x 2)
  - G = 2 Wheel and 4 Wheel Drive models (does not apply to Guts or Canter Guts)
- 3rd Digit: "Odd Numbers" stands for Standard Body and "Even Numbers" means wide body
- 4th Digit: the 4th digit corresponds to the maximum payload
  - 0 to 3 = Maximum Payload of 2 - 3 tons.
  - 4 = Maximum Payload of 3.5 tons.
  - 5 = Maximum Payload of 4 - 4.7 tons
- 5th Digit: Corresponds to the engine model
  - 1 = 4D30
  - 2 = 4M51
  - 5 = 4D32
  - 6 = 4D36
  - 7 = 4D33
  - 8 = 4D35
  - 9 = 4D31(T), 4D34(T), or 4D34T4
- 5th Digit for 1999 models and above: The model code was checked in 1999 from numeric to alphabet.
  - B = 4M42
  - C = 4D33
  - D = 4M50(T)
  - E = 4M51(1) or 4M51(2)
- 6th Digit: Corresponds to wheelbase
  - B = 2500/2520mm
  - C = 2750mm
  - E = 3350mm
  - F = 3760mm
  - G = 3850mm
- 7th Digit: Corresponds to the body specification
  - D = Dump Truck
  - C = Dump Truck
  - P = Packer

Thus, the example of "FE305BD" decodes as:

1. F = Fuso Truck
2. E = Rear Wheel Drive (4 x 2)
3. 3 = Standard Body
4. 0 = Maximum Capacity of 3-4 Tons
5. 5 = 4D32 Engine
6. B = 2500/2520mm
7. D = Dump -->

== See also ==
- List of low cab forward trucks
- Mitsubishi Fuso Truck & Bus Corporation
- Mitsubishi Fuso Truck of America, Inc.
