= Fuso Ecanter =

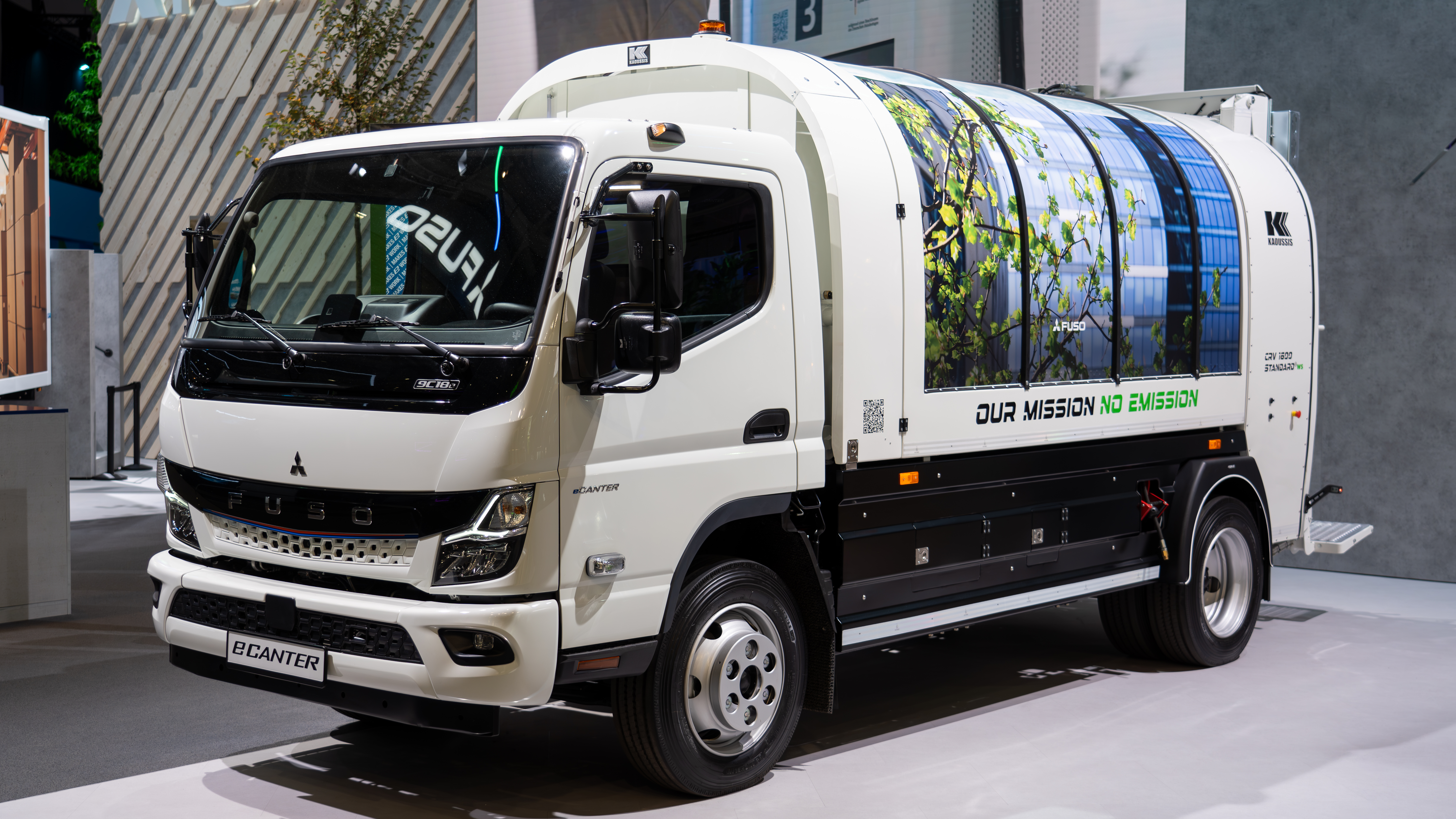

Overview
- Manufacturer: Mitsubishi Fuso Truck and Bus Corporation
- Also called: RIZON Trucks (North America, 2023-Present)
- Production: 2017-present
- Assembly: Japan: Kawasaki; Portugal: Tramagal

Body and chassis
- Class: Truck
- Body style: Truck (standard cab, crew cab)

Powertrain
- Engine: Permanent synchronous electric motor

The Fuso Ecanter, also stylized as FUSO eCanter, is an electric truck in the class of light commercial vehicles produced by the Mitsubishi Fuso Truck and Bus Corporation.

The Fuso Ecanter, a variant of the Fuso Canter, has a gross vehicle weight of 7.49 tonnes and a payload of 4.5 tons.

The electric motor has a power of 115 kW (154 hp). The light truck was first introduced in 2016 and the first units were delivered in 2017. Daimler initially produced 500 vehicles in 2017 and 2018 and planned to start mass production in 2019.

The Fuso Ecanter will also be sold in North America under the RIZON brand starting in 2023.

== Presentation ==
The light truck was presented at the IAA Commercial Vehicles 2016 in Hanover and represents the third development generation of the project Mitsubishi Fuso Canter 3S13 E-Cell. At that time, a permanent synchronous machine with an output of 185 kW/251 hp and a torque of 380 Newton meters was used. The power was transmitted via an input gear to the rear axle.

On September 14, 2017 in New York, Daimler and Fuso celebrated the delivery of 3 units of the eCanter to UPS, as well as to four New York City non-profits, which included the Wildlife Conservation Society, New York Botanical Garden, Habitat for Humanity New York City and Big Reuse Brooklyn.

== Specifications ==
=== Chassis ===
The chassis of the Fuso eCanter is based on the 8th generation of the Mitsubishi Fuso Canter in the 7.5-tonne version with a possible payload on the chassis of 4.5 tons at the start of the small series production in 2017.

=== Drive and Battery ===
The electric motor produces 115 kW (154 hp) and 390 N⋅m (288 lb⋅ft), which are available as usual for electric motors from the first turn on. The traction battery consists of 112 kg battery packs, which in turn consist of 100 lithium-ion cells with a capacity of 13.8 kWh per package. Depending on the configuration, up to 6 individual water-cooled battery packs to a total capacity of 82.8 kWh and a maximum of 420 [Volt] voltage. This should allow a range of 100 km. The battery can be charged up to 80 percent in 9 hours with alternating current, for example, overnight. With direct current, 80 percent of the capacity can be charged in one hour via an EU-compliant CCS-Type-2 charger.

== Production ==
The small series production of the eCanter launched in the Japanese main plant of Mitsubishi Fuso in Kawasaki on July 7, 2017.

Low-volume production in Europe started on 27 July 2017 at Fuso plant Tramagal in Portugal in the presence of Portuguese President Marcelo Rebelo de Sousa and Marc Llistosella (President and CEO Mitsubishi Fuso Truck and Bus Corporation) and plant manager Jorge Rosa. The Ecanter is manufactured in line with the conventional Canter Light Truck. The special components for the electric powertrain are installed in stations parallel to the production line.
