= Mitsubishi 4M4 engine =

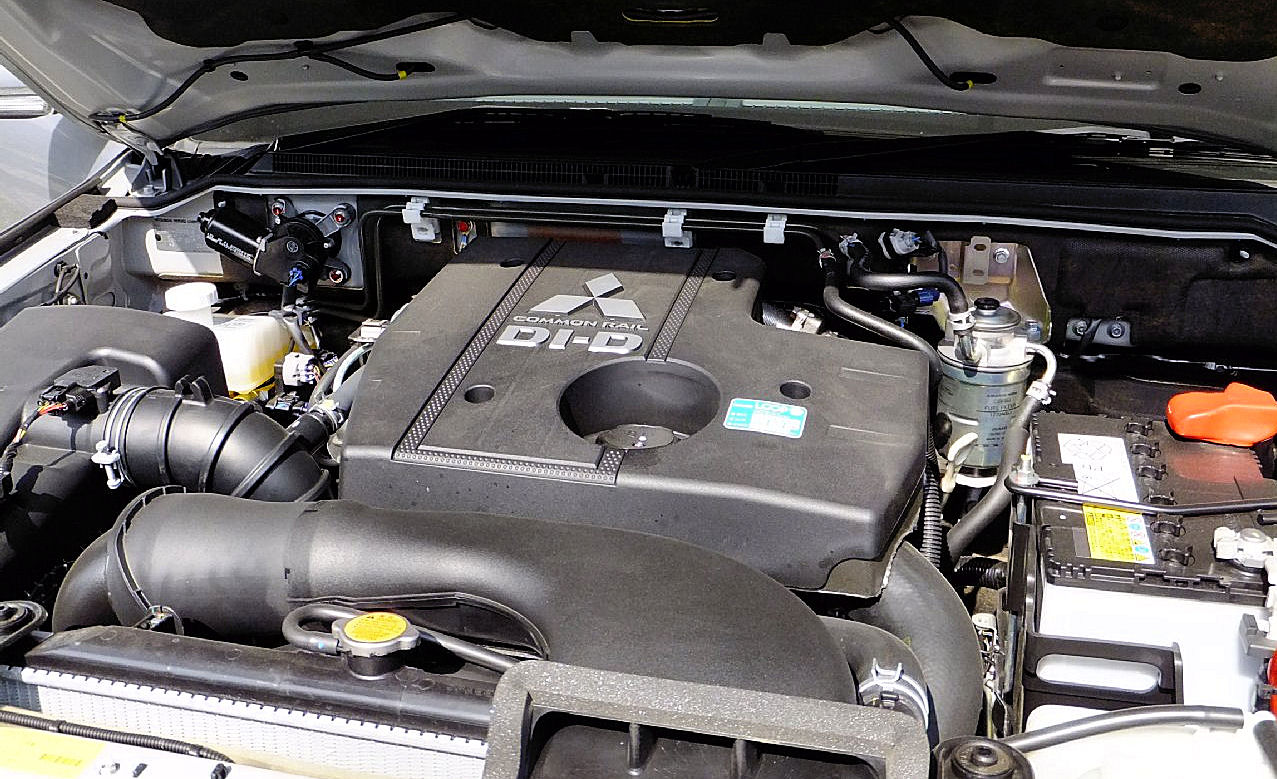
- Mitsubishi 4M41 on the Pajero VR-II

Overview
- Manufacturer: Mitsubishi Motors
- Production: 01/1993-

Layout
- Configuration: Straight-4
- Displacement: 2.8–3.2 L (2,835–3,200 cc)
- Cylinder bore: 95 mm (3.74 in); 98.5 mm (3.88 in); 95 mm (3.74 in)
- Piston stroke: 100 mm (3.94 in); 105 mm (4.13 in); 105 mm (4.13 in)
- Cylinder block material: Cast iron
- Valvetrain: SOHC, DOHC 4 valves x cyl.
- Compression ratio: 16.0:1-21.0:1

Combustion
- Turbocharger: TD04 turbo (4M40); TF035 turbo (4M40/4M41); IHI RHV5 variable-geometry turbo (4M41); Intercooler available
- Fuel system: Zexel Mechanical or Electronically controlled Distributor type injection pump Denso Common rail direct injection
- Fuel type: Diesel
- Cooling system: Water-cooled

Output
- Power output: 59–147 kW (80–200 PS)
- Torque output: 198–441 N⋅m (146–325 lb⋅ft)

The Mitsubishi 4M4 engine is a range of four-cylinder diesel piston engines from Mitsubishi Motors, first introduced in the second generation of their Montero/Pajero/Shogun SUVs. They superseded the previous 4D5 engine family, main differences are enlarged displacements and the utilization of one or two over-head camshafts. Originally available only as a 2835 cc intercooled turbo, detail improvements in 1996 and a larger 3.2 litre option in 1999 served to improve power, torque, fuel economy and emissions. The final version has 3.0 litres swept volume and Common rail direct injection.

== 4M40 ==
Inline 4-cylinder SOHC, bore x stroke = 95 mm × 100 mm (3.74 in × 3.94 in), 2,835 cc (173.0 cu in), swirl combustion chamber

=== Naturally aspirated ===
Compression ratio 21.0:1, Zexel Distributor type injection pump, 59 kW (80 PS) at 4000 rpm, 198 N⋅m (146 lb⋅ft) at 2000 rpm

Applications:

- 1996–1999 Canter (lightest-duty), 69 kW (94 PS), 191 N⋅m (141 lb⋅ft) at 2000 rpm

=== Intercooled turbo gen 1 ===
Compression ratio 21.0:1, 92 kW (125 PS) at 4000 rpm, 294 N⋅m (217 lb⋅ft) at 2000 rpm

Applications:

- 1993–1999 Pajero (second generation)
- 1996–2013 Mitsubishi Type 73 light truck, second generation
- 1998–2003 Triton/L200 Sport 4x4
- 1999–2009 Mitsubishi Colt LDV 4x4

=== Intercooled turbo gen 2 ===
Compression ratio 21.0:1, Zexel Electronically controlled or Mechanical controlled distributor type Injection Pump, 103 kW (140 PS) at 4000 rpm, 314 N⋅m (232 lb⋅ft) at 2000 rpm

Applications:

- 2003–2006 Triton/L200 Sport 4x4
- 1994–2006 L400 Delica

== 4M41 ==
Inline 4-cylinder DOHC 16 valve, Bore x Stroke 98.5 mm × 105 mm (3.88 in × 4.13 in), 3,200 cc (200 cu in)

=== Intercooled turbo ===
Compression ratio 17.0:1, Zexel Electronic control type distributor type pump (direct injection inside diesel tube) or Denso Common Rail direct injection, 121 kW (165 PS) at 4000 rpm, 351 N⋅m (259 lb⋅ft) at 2000-3000 rpm

Applications:

- 1999-2006 Pajero (third generation)
- 2005-2011 Triton/L200/Strada, 118 kW (160 PS) at 3800 rpm, 343 N⋅m (253 lb⋅ft) at 2000 rpm
- 2004-2006 Pajero (Philippine Domestic Market), 121 kW (165 PS) at 3800 rpm, 373 N⋅m (276 lb⋅ft) at 2000 rpm
- 2008-2011 Pajero Sport/Montero Sport, 120 kW (163 PS) at 3500 rpm, 343 N⋅m (253 lb⋅ft) at 2000 rpm

=== Variable geometry intercooled turbo ===
Compression ratio 17.0:1 or 16.0:1, Denso Common Rail Direct Injection

Applications:

- 2006–2009 Pajero (fourth generation), 125 kW (170 PS) at 3800 rpm; manual transmission: 118 kW (160 PS), 382 N⋅m (282 lb⋅ft) at 2000 rpm
- 2010–2022 Pajero (fourth generation), 147 kW (200 PS) at 3800 rpm, 441 N⋅m (325 lb⋅ft) at 2000 rpm

== 4M42 ==
Inline 4-cylinder DOHC 16 valve, Bore x Stroke 95 mm × 105 mm (3.74 in × 4.13 in), 2,977 cc (181.7 cu in), direct injection

OAT, Applications:

- 2001-2007 Mitsubishi Fuso Canter

CR, Applications:

- 2007-2010 Mitsubishi Fuso Canter, 92 kW
- 2007-2010 Mitsubishi Fuso Canter, 107 kW

== See also ==
- List of Mitsubishi engines
- List of Mitsubishi Fuso engines
