= Tramagal =

Civil parish in Portugal

- Civil parish
- Location in Portugal
- Coordinates: 39.451°N 8.247°W
- Country: Portugal
- Region: Oeste e Vale do Tejo
- Intermunic. comm.: Médio Tejo
- District: Santarém
- Municipality: Abrantes

Area
  - Total: 24.10 km^{2} (9.31 sq mi)

Population (2011)
  - Total: 3,500
  - Density: 150/km^{2} (380/sq mi)
- Time zone: UTC+00:00 (WET)
  - Summer (DST): UTC+01:00 (WEST)

Tramagal is a Portuguese freguesia ("civil parish"), located in Abrantes Municipality, in Santarém District. The population in 2011 was 3,500, in an area of 24.10 km^{2}. The parish is the third-most populous in the municipality.

== Economy ==
Tramagal is the seat of a historical ironworks, originally called Metalúrgica Duarte Ferreira, which was later acquired by Mitsubishi's truck division Fuso, majority owned by the Daimler Truck group. In the 1960s the factory produced, under licence, Berliet trucks for the Portuguese military. As of 2023, it hosts European production of the eCanter electric light truck.

== History ==
According to local tradition, the name Tramagal derives from tramagas or tramagueiras — shrubs with astringent bark and medicinal properties — which are said to have caught the attention of Queen Eleanor of Viseu as she passed through the region.

Tramagal gained significant economic prominence in the 20th century following the establishment and subsequent expansion of its ironworks into a major truck manufacturing facility serving European markets.

== Economy ==
The principal industrial facility in Tramagal was established in 1964 as a joint venture between the Duarte Ferreira family company and the French truck manufacturer Berliet, producing military vehicles under licence for the Portuguese Colonial War (1961–1974). At its peak the plant employed more than 3,000 workers.

In 1980, the plant began CKD (completely-knocked-down) assembly for Mitsubishi Fuso Bus and Truck Corporation (MFTBC), producing the Fuso Canter light-duty truck for European markets. The facility became part of Daimler Truck in 2004 following the acquisition of a majority share in Mitsubishi Fuso. As of 2024, more than 260,000 vehicles have been manufactured at the Tramagal plant since production began in 1964.

In 2017, the Tramagal plant commenced small-series production of the Fuso eCanter, the first battery-electric light truck manufactured by FUSO. Since 2023, the next-generation eCanter has been manufactured at the site in mass production, making Tramagal one of the few European facilities dedicated to large-scale electric light commercial vehicle production. The plant is the central European production facility for the Daimler Truck-owned FUSO brand, manufacturing all Canter and eCanter models for the European market.

In December 2021, the Tramagal plant was selected to begin production of the updated Fuso Canter model, reaffirming its position as the group's central European manufacturing hub.

Tramagal also has a winemaking tradition. The Quinta do Casal da Coelheira, a 330-hectare estate in its third generation of family ownership, produces wines that have received distinctions at international competitions including the Winternational Wine Challenge (London), the Vinalies Internationales (Paris), and the Concours Mondial du Vin (Brussels).

== Transport ==
Tramagal is served by the Linha da Beira Baixa, a 240-kilometre electrified single-track railway line inaugurated on 6 September 1891, connecting Entroncamento and Guarda.The line was inaugurated by King Carlos and Queen Amélia and passes through Abrantes, Castelo Branco, Fundão, and Covilhã on its route to the Spanish border region.

The Tramagal station also serves as the junction point for a short freight spur line connecting the Fuso manufacturing plant directly to the national rail network, facilitating the transport of raw materials and finished vehicles.
