= DaimlerChrysler–Mitsubishi alliance =

Deal between automakers

The DaimlerChrysler–Mitsubishi alliance refers to the 69-month period during which U.S.-German automaker DaimlerChrysler AG (DCX) held a controlling stake in Mitsubishi Motors Corporation (MMC). First established on March 27, 2000, with the signing of a letter of intent, it was initiated by Jürgen E. Schrempp, the chairman of DCX, who was attempting to build what he called a "Welt AG" (global corporation) which would have as widespread a presence across worldwide automotive markets as its rivals. The merger with the Chrysler Corporation had increased Daimler-Benz's share of the North American market, and Mitsubishi Motors offered a gateway to Asia.

The deal was to prove costly for both DaimlerChrysler shareholders and for Schrempp personally, whose part in the deal contributed to his eventual replacement at the helm of DCX in 2006.

== Background ==
Jürgen Schrempp was one of the primary architects of the "Welt AG" plan, developed by Daimler-Benz to increase its presence in the American and Asian markets, and to improve its profitability. Schrempp believed that a modern automaker needed a full range of products beyond the luxury vehicle market in which Mercedes-Benz competed, and began looking for a partner as soon as he became chairman in 1994. The Chrysler Corporation was targeted in 1995, and on January 12, 1998, he met with Chrysler chairman Bob Eaton with the intent of negotiating a merger/takeover. Following its completion in May that year, Schrempp then turned to Asia.

However, DaimlerChrysler's first steps came to nothing. It considered but ultimately declined to invest in Nissan prior to the Japanese company's alliance with Renault, and it was rumoured that they also courted Honda that same year. Schrempp, who had given a speech in Tokyo in early 1999 where he predicted DCX's market share in Asia would increase from 1.3 to over 10 percent, began to come under pressure to deliver on his promises.

Mitsubishi Motors was DaimlerChrysler's third choice partner, but in 1999 MMC chairman Katsuhiko Kawasoe rebuffed their initial approach. However, in the aftermath of the 1997 East Asian financial crisis MMC was saddled with ¥1.7 trillion of debt, and some outside analysts were suggesting that the company should give priority to becoming a takeover or merger target. Kawasoe rejected this, preferring to present Mitsubishi as an equal partner to potential suitors, adding that Mitsubishi would continue to follow their longstanding approach of establishing ventures without capital tie-ups. But eventually a deal was struck: DCX would purchase a controlling 34 percent stake in the company for ¥450 billion (€2.1 billion). This would ostensibly preserve Mitsubishi's "independence", as only three out of the company's ten board members would be elected by the new largest shareholder, although DaimlerChrysler did now possess a veto power over boardroom decisions. For DCX, the benefit would come from increased market share without MMC's debts appearing on their balance sheet.

== Recall cover up ==
Shortly after the deal was finalised, Mitsubishi became embroiled in accusations that it had covered up complaints from customers about defects in their vehicles. A police raid on its headquarters in July 2000 uncovered hidden documents stashed in a locker, and soon after over 500,000 vehicles were recalled for repairs. Mitsubishi's shares fell by 13 percent as these revelations became public, and over the summer, further investigations took a similar toll on the company's stock. By the end of August, following a second police raid, the total number of vehicles recalled had reached one million, while the share price had fallen by almost 30 percent. As a result of the collapse in the value of Mitsubishi, DaimlerChrysler renegotiated a €200 million reduction price of its stock purchase, while Kawasoe was forced to step down as chairman.

== Increasing control ==
Mitsubishi's difficulties contributed to a sharp fall in the DaimlerChrysler group's profits, and following the recall of a further 1.5 million cars in February 2001, including almost a million in the U.S., the German parent moved quickly to restructure; approximately 10,000 Mitsubishi employees would be axed and one of its four assembly plants would be closed.

The following month, DaimlerChrysler approached Volvo about acquiring the Swedish automaker's 3.3 percent stake in Mitsubishi. Volvo had planned on forming a joint venture with MMC for bus and truck manufacturing as part of a deal originally negotiated in 1999, until the involvement of DaimlerChrysler, a rival in the commercial vehicle marketplace, led Volvo to ultimately withdraw. The €760 million sale was concluded in April 2001, taking DCX's share to 37.3 percent.

Olivier Boulay, then the head of DaimlerChrysler's Japanese design studio in Yokohama, was recruited by Mitsubishi in May 2001. Answering directly to Rolf Eckrodt, the DCX-appointed Chief Operating Officer, Boulay's appointment was part of the "Turnaround Plan" initiated by Eckrodt and new Chief Executive Takashi Sonobe, where Mitsubishi tried to move away from an engineering-led approach to development. Despite the new initiatives and increased investment, Mitsubishi Motors announced a revised profit forecast in April 2001, and their downward projections were confirmed in May when the company reported a net loss for the year of ¥278 billion.

During 2001 and 2002 DaimlerChrysler and Mitsubishi began to co-operate more closely on longer-term ventures. A €244 million plant would be built at Kölleda in Germany to manufacture engines for the new Z-car platform, while in concert with Hyundai they established the Global Engine Manufacturing Alliance, a joint venture with an annual capacity of two million powerplants in five factories across the globe. There was also extensive platform sharing, cross-supply agreements, and manufacturing subcontracts, which were reflected in the 2002-2013 Colt and first-generation Smart Forfour.

== Unravelling ties ==
Despite DaimlerChrysler's involvement, debts at Mitsubishi continued to accumulate. A torpid economy in Japan dragged down the company's domestic performance in 2003, while the same year the after effects of a disastrous credit scheme in the U.S. saw Mitsubishi Motors North America suffer a US$454 million loss. By 2004 the automaker owed ¥1.14 trillion, and a ¥700 billion rescue plan was put to shareholders in April. Other companies within the keiretsu of Mitsubishi which owned 23 percent of MMC were committed to the plan, and the Japan Development Bank had also been approached for support.

However, at DaimlerChrysler there was dissent against the idea of further investment; only weeks before Schrempp had endured calls for his resignation from shareholders. In the face of this and his boardroom's opposition, DCX refused to pledge further funds, and formally stated that it would no longer financially support its partner. Japan's finance minister, Nobuteru Ishihara, commented that the decision "could affect the future of the company", while corporate analysts were more forthright, calling it "a disaster" and claiming that "[Mitsubishi] will vanish if it continues this way."

An alternative rescue package was formulated by May 2004, involving a ¥450 billion investment in newly issued stock by U.S. bank JPMorgan Chase, Tokyo-based private investment fund Phoenix Capital and other Mitsubishi Group companies. The deal was announced as MMC reported a loss for the year of ¥215 billion. Further negotiations, and the involvement of the China Motor Corporation, boosted this figure to ¥546 billion by June, in return for 11,000 redundancies and cuts to corporate pensions, salaries and bonuses. As a result of the new investment, DaimlerChrysler's own stake was diluted.

Profitability remained out of reach for Mitsubishi, and enlarged losses in 2005 were forecast by the company. The company's stock price slid 41 percent in 2004 to approximately one quarter the value of when DaimlerChrysler first became involved.

== Divorce ==
Following DaimlerChrysler's decision to cease further investment in its Japanese partner, Rolf Eckrodt stepped down as chairman and CEO of Mitsubishi, and retired from DCX in April 2004. Soon after, Chrysler's Chief Operating Officer Wolfgang Bernhard also parted ways with the German parent over its continuing troubles and falling profits, while the merger with MMC was now routinely being referred to by the media as a "debacle". A third attempt to recapitalize Mitsubishi in January 2005 led to ¥540 billion of further investment, and DaimlerChrysler's now owned only a 12.4 percent stake. Finally, on November 11, 2005, the remaining stock was sold for US$1.1 billion. Three days later the buyer, investment bank Goldman Sachs sold the shares on for US$80 million profit.

New major stockholder Phoenix Capital followed suit the following month, selling all but 50 million of its 575 million shares to JPMorgan on December 9, 2005, and once again the investment bank offloaded their purchase within a few days for tens of millions of dollars in profit. In both cases, the eventual buyers were part of the Mitsubishi keiretsu, returning MMC to Japanese ownership.

By 2007, DaimlerChrysler had also found themselves in a divorce on their own when Daimler sold Chrysler to Cerberus Capital Management for US$6 billion.

== Corporate performance ==
Mitsubishi Motors' revenue, net profit/loss, and assets before, during, and immediately after the period when DaimlerChrysler held a share.

Fiscal year	Revenue	Profit/Loss	Assets
1998	¥3,512.6 billion	¥5.7 billion	n/a
1999	¥3,335.0 bn	-¥23.3 bn	¥2,784.1 bn
2000	¥3,276.7 bn	-¥278.1 bn	¥2,981.7 bn
2001	¥3,200.7 bn	¥11.2 bn	¥2,894.6 bn
2002	¥3,884.9 bn	¥37.4 bn	¥2,425.4 bn
2003	¥2,519.4 bn	-¥215.4 bn	¥2,029.0 bn
2004	¥2,122.6 bn	-¥474.8 bn	¥1,589.3 bn
2005	¥2,120.1 bn	-¥92.2 bn	¥1,557.6 bn
2006	¥2,202.9 bn	¥8.7 bn	¥1,778.7 bn

Mitsubishi Motors' financial performance during the years 1998 to 2006.
