= Mitsubishi Fuso Fighter =

Truck

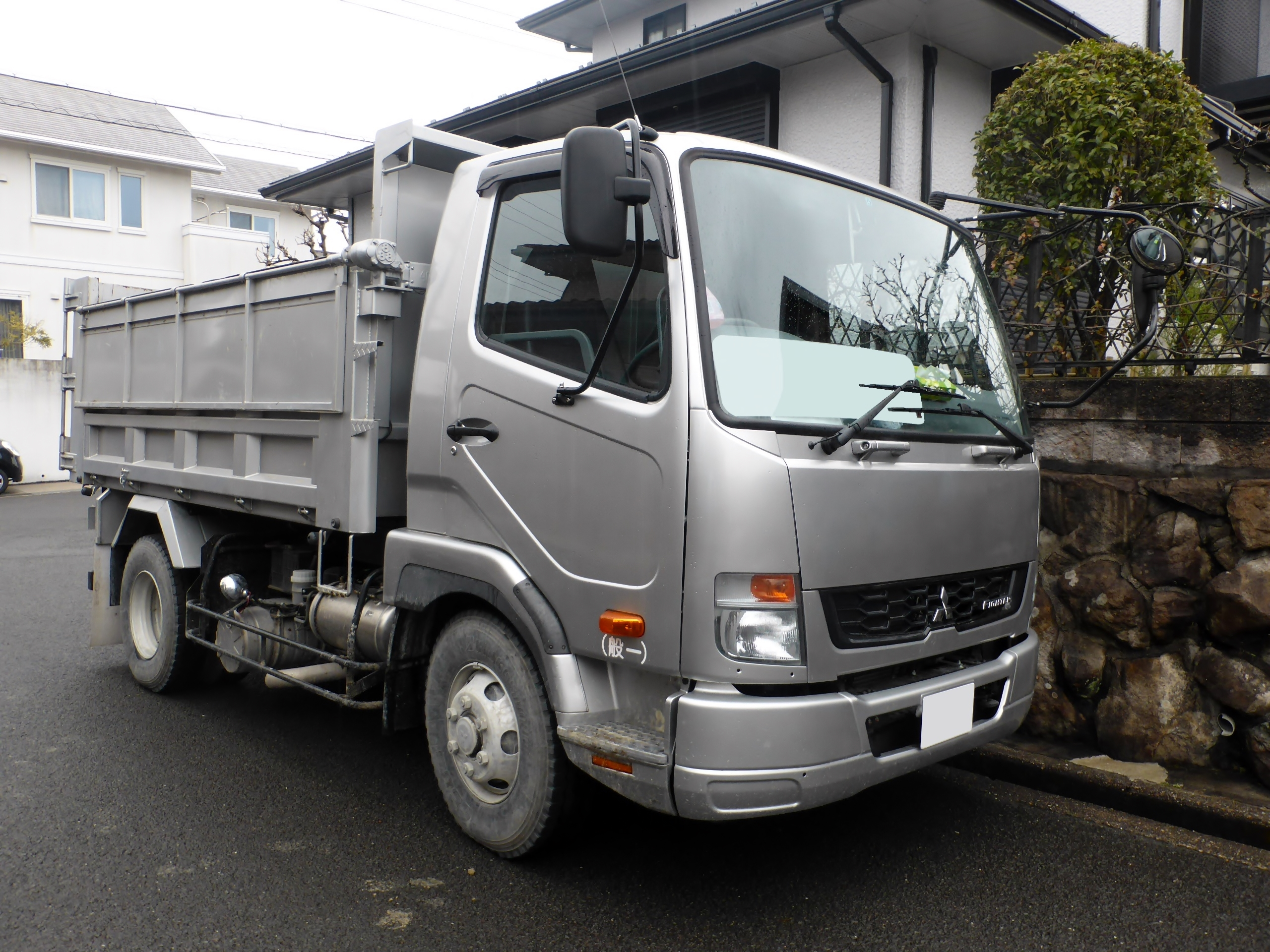

Overview
- Manufacturer: Mitsubishi Motors Corporation (1984–2002); Mitsubishi Fuso Truck and Bus Corporation (2003–2026); Hino Motors (2026–present)
- Production: 1984–present

Body and chassis
- Class: Truck
- Body style: Single cab (worldwide); Crew cab (certain regions)
- Related: Hyundai 4.5 to 5-ton truck Mercedes-Benz Axor; Mercedes-Benz Actros; Mercedes-Benz Arocs; Mercedes-Benz Atego

Powertrain
- Engine: 4M50, 6D14, 6D15, 6D16, 6D17, 6D31 (for export outside Japan), 6M60, 6M61
- Transmission: 5-speed manual 6-speed manual INOMAT 6-speed automatic Eaton 9-speed manual (range selector); 10-speed manual (high-low splitter); 8-speed automatic (TMMS)

Chronology
- Predecessor: Mitsubishi Fuso FK series

The Mitsubishi Fuso Fighter (Japanese: 三菱ふそう・ファイター, Hepburn: Mitsubishi Fusō Faitā) is a line of medium- and heavy-duty trucks produced by Mitsubishi Fuso.

== First generation (1984–1992) ==
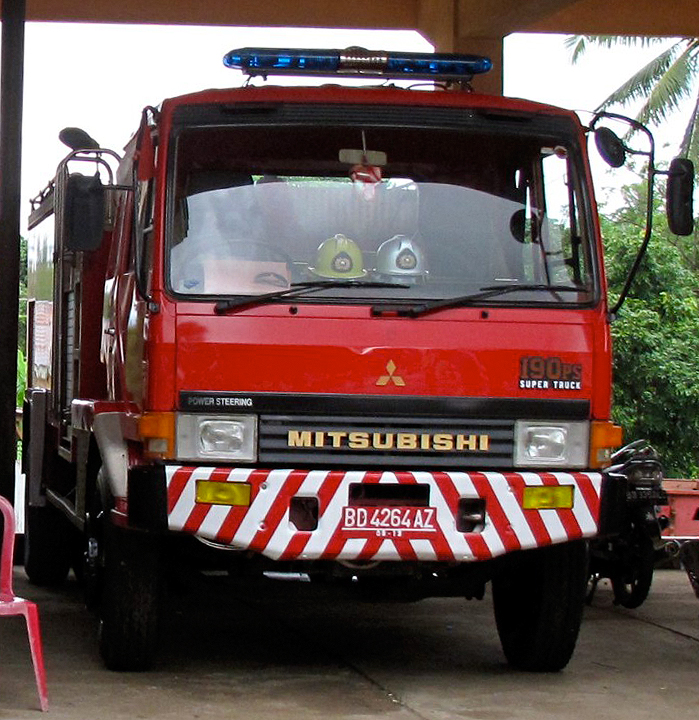
1st-gen Fighter fire truck in Indonesia

The first-generation Fighter was originally introduced in February 1984 as a successor to the FK series (though "FK" still designates lighter-duty Fighter models). Designed in line with the smaller Canter and the larger The Great, it shared parts with the latter, including the headlights, doors, and rear window glass. In most export markets, four round headlights were fitted rather than the square lamps used in Japan.

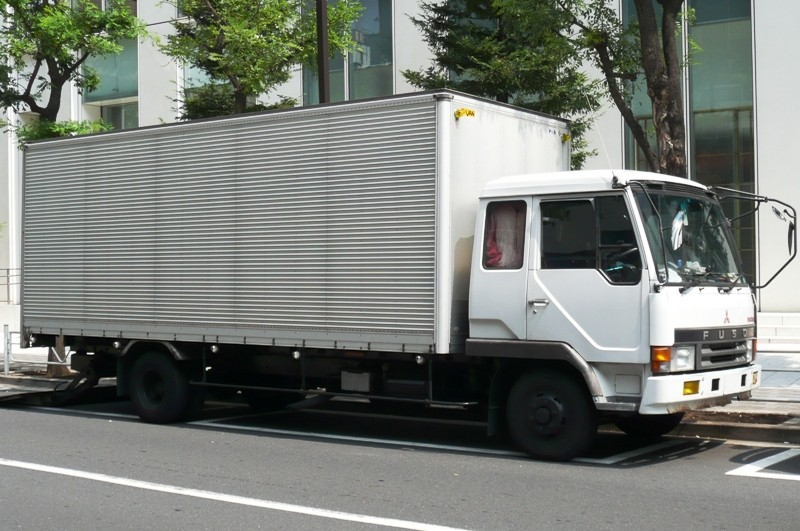
Facelift Fighter model

In December 1987, it received slightly refreshed front styling with an additional panel above the grille, and a 230 PS (170 kW) intercooled turbo-diesel engine became available. The FM series was updated in February 1988 alongside the 4WD-based FL models. February 1990 saw the first year of Heisei-era emissions compliance and another slight change in the design of the grille.

=== Facelift ===
In July 1991, the Fighter received a facelift, including new corner lamps and ABS as standard equipment on the FK. Also new was a 210 PS (154 kW) naturally aspirated engine. That year, advertisements for the Fighter bore the slogan "The power of the brand, walking with professional men. Fuso Fighter, on the roads of Japan more than anyone else". (Note: Puro no otokotachi to ayumu, burando no jitsuryoku. Dare yori mo Nihon no michi ni, Fusou Faitā (プロの男たちと歩む、ブランドの実力。誰よりも日本の道に、ふそうファイター)) Ken Takakura and Aki Yashiro's song "Elegy" was featured in commercials.

=== Maru-P ===
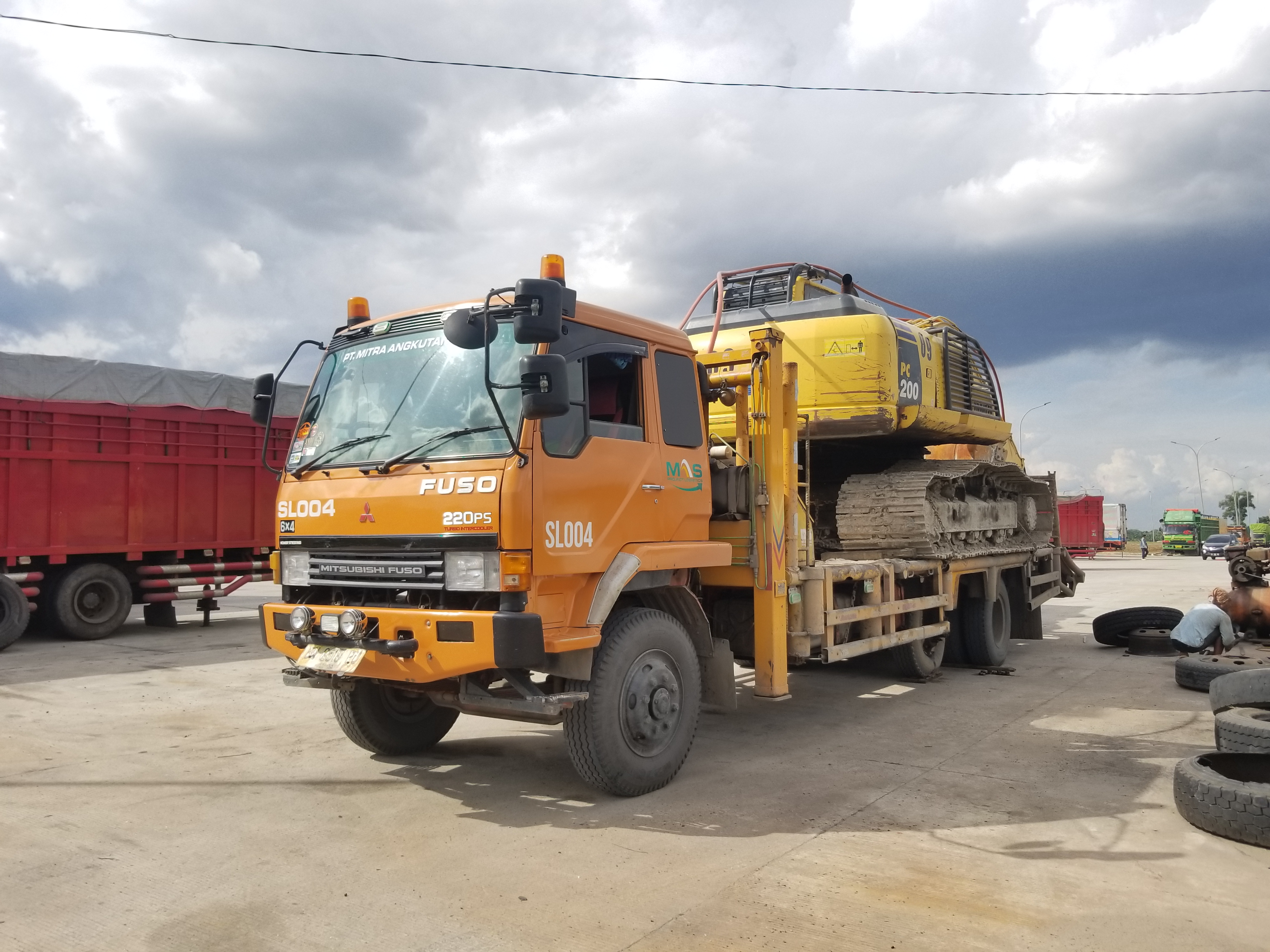
Fuso FN527 Fighter 6x4 Flatbed carrying an excavator in Indonesia

This generation was produced and sold from 1985 through April 2022 in Indonesia, internally known as the Maru-P. It was discontinued due to Euro 4 emissions regulations, being replaced with the second-generation model with the 2011 facelift. It was equipped with either the 190 PS (140 kW) 6D16 naturally aspirated engine with a 5-speed gearbox, or the 220 PS (162 kW) 6D16T turbo engine with an Eaton FS-8209 9-speed gearbox.

== Second generation (1992–2026) ==
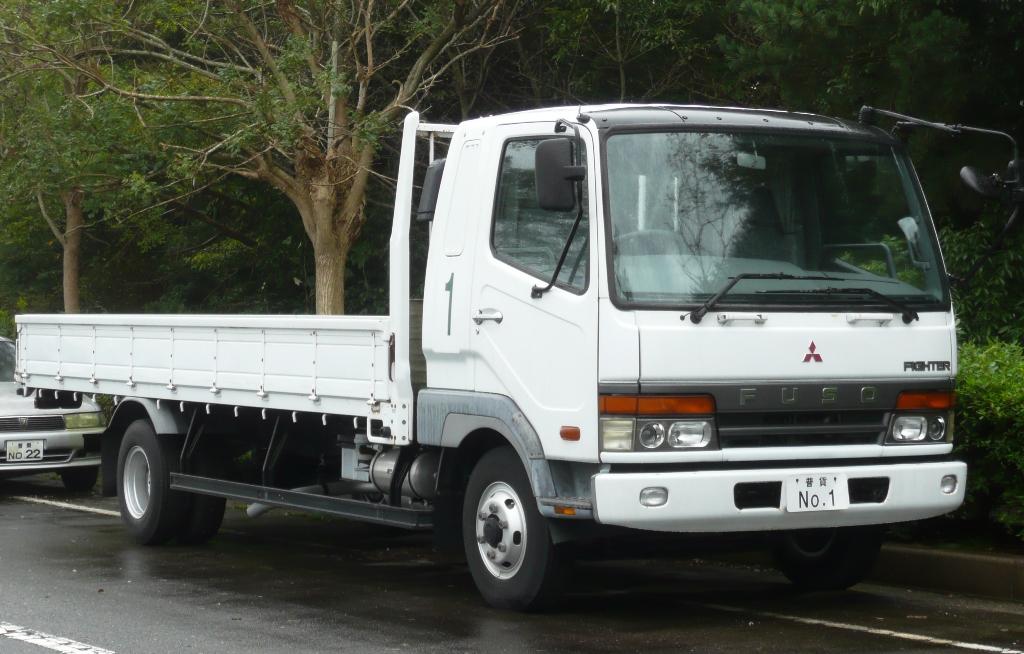
2nd-gen Fighter in Japan

The second generation, also called the Full-Com Fighter (フルコンファイター, Furukon Faitā; short for "Full Comfort"), was introduced in July 1992 and fitted with projector headlights which were later also added to the facelifted The Great. In export markets, it was fitted with twin rectangular headlights instead. Hong Kong actor Jackie Chan appeared in commercials for the Fighter, and its slogan was "Exciting Handsome".

April 1995 saw 1994 emissions regulations come into effect for the Fighter, earning it the nickname Powerful-Com Fighter (パワフルコンファイター, Pawafurukon Faitā; short for "Powerful Comfort") , as well as the introduction of the lightweight SL model. In December 1996, the range was updated with the FK-Z, which had a load capacity of 7.5 tons, and the FL-X, with a low floor and full-time all-wheel drive.

In February 1997, the Fighter received numerous updates. A rear-axle parking brake became standard equipment in trucks with a GVWR of more than 11 tons, and could be installed as an option on lighter trucks. Side door beams and impact-absorbing steering became standard on all models. Models with engines producing over 200 PS (150 kW) were equipped with a hill start assist device called "EZGO". The opening mechanism of the passenger window was changed, and the fender trim was removed.

The short-cab Fighter NX was added in 1998. The shorter cab increased cargo volume by 305 mm lengthwise, but maximum load weight stayed the same. The replacement of the bed with a box also meant that the NX was less suitable for long-distance trips as opposed to local or suburban trips. Norika Fujiwara featured in Fighter NX commercials.

=== First facelift ===
The Fighter's first facelift, dubbed the New Fighter, came in 14 April 1999. Designed in line with The Great's successor, the Super Great, its headlights are compatible with pre-facelift Fighters and late The Great models. Engine options were changed to the 6M60 and 6M61, which complied with 1998 emissions regulations. Airbags were also added. That June, the "INOMAT" mechanical automatic gearbox was introduced as an option.

In February 2002, a 5-speed automatic gearbox was added as an option, the front turn signal covers were changed from amber to clear, and the number of standard color variations was increased to nine. In June and July of the same year, an "INOMAT-II" gearbox and CNG engine were respectively added to the range.

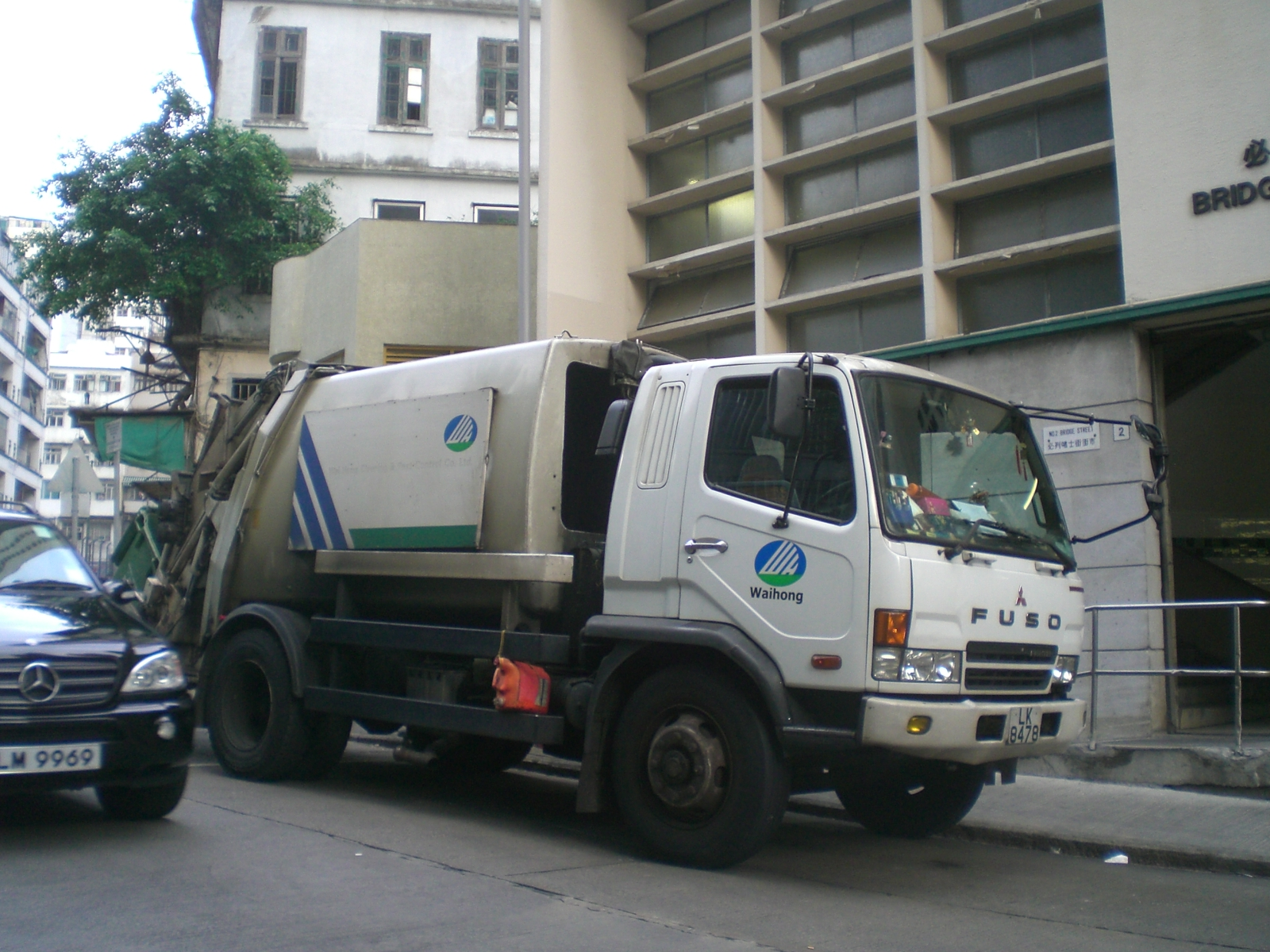
"New Fighter" in Hong Kong

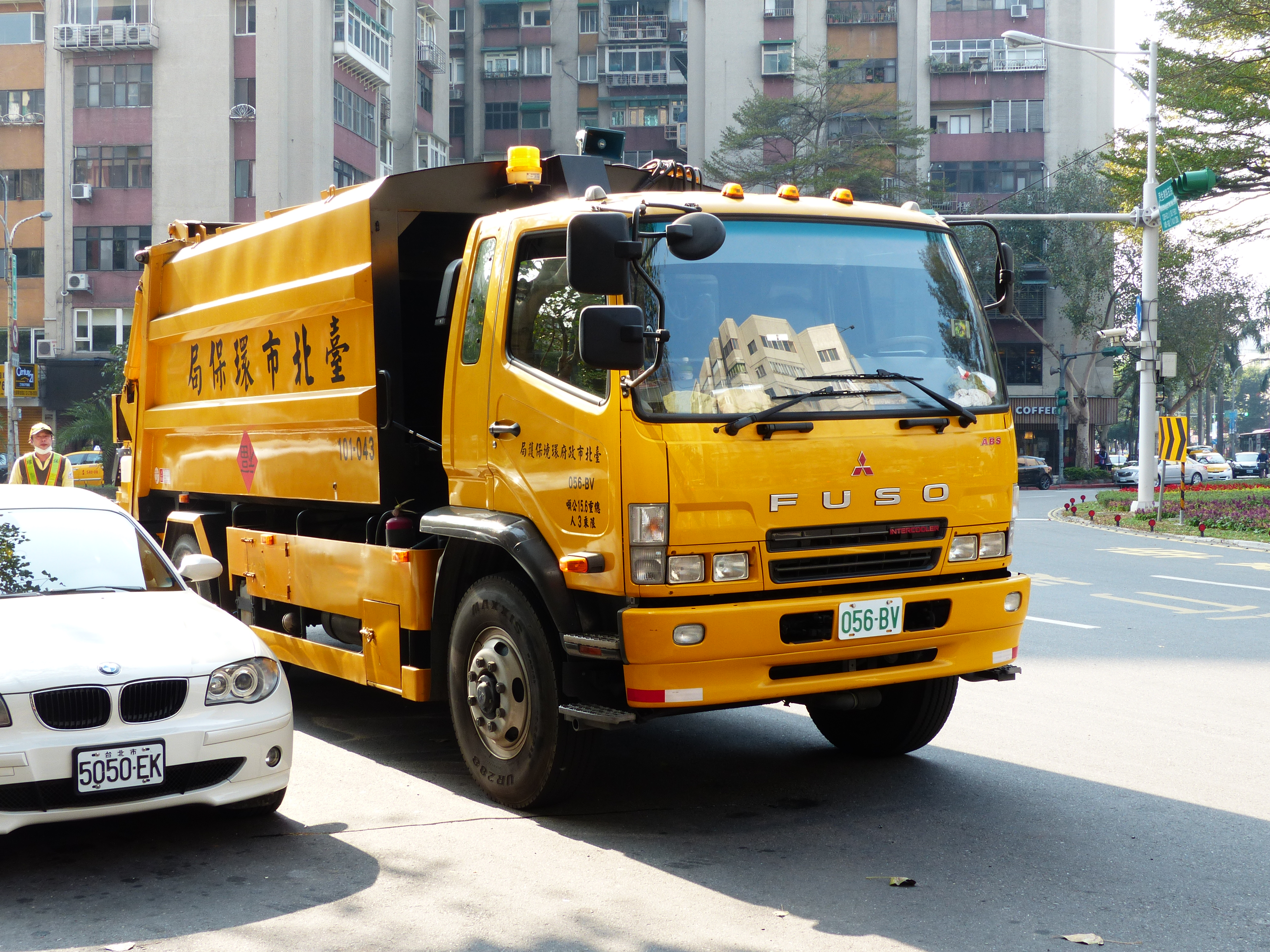
"New Fighter" in Taipei, Taiwan

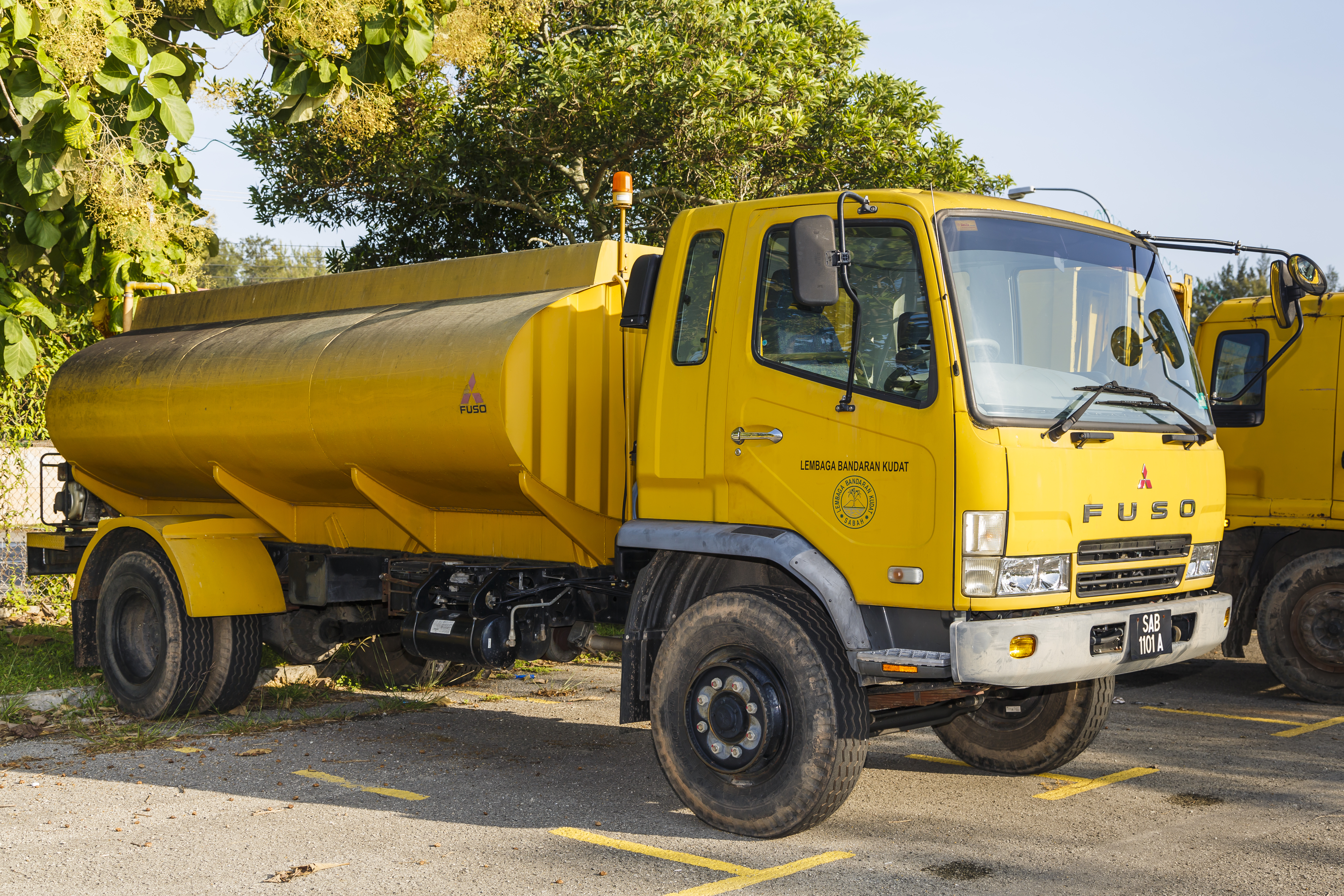
"New Fighter" in Kudat, Malaysia

=== Second facelift ===
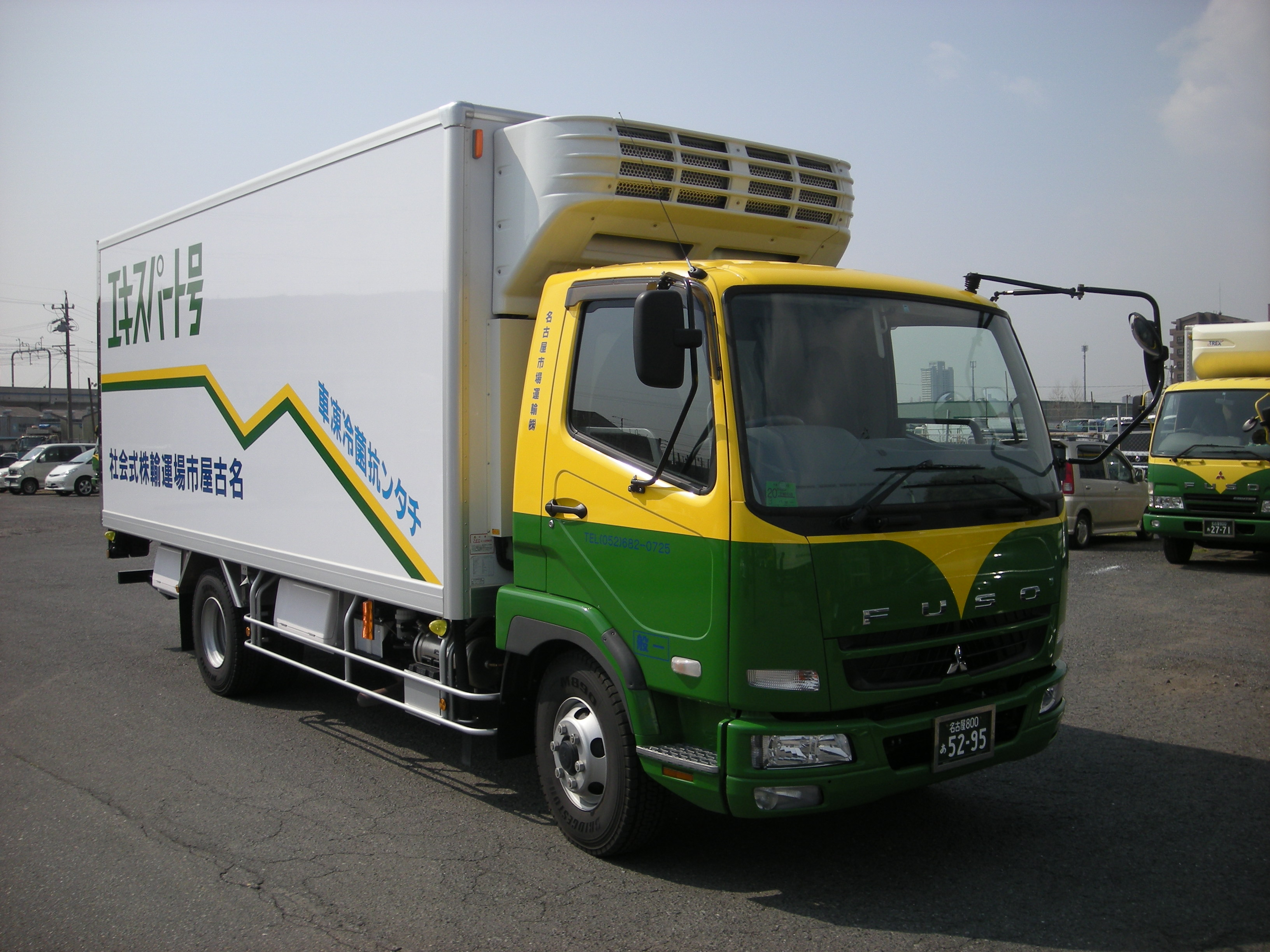
2005 "Best One Fighter"

The Fighter's second facelift came in October 2005, known as the Best One Fighter. The Fighter NX dropped the "NX" in its name, becoming just the Fighter. Trucks with a GVWR of more than 11 tons gained wedge air brakes as standard equipment, being the only vehicles in their class to do so. Influenced by the 2004 "FUSO" concept tractor truck, the headlights were relocated to the front bumper—a first for a Fuso truck—though a separate front styling package with cab-mounted headlights was also available. Other aesthetic customization options included seat upholstery and a chrome bumper.

2007 saw the emissions regulations introduced on 15 June 2005 come into effect for the Fighter. All-wheel air suspension was added in September 2008.

Following Daimler's acquisition of Fuso, sub-20-ton Fighters were given BlueTEC engines in June 2010 to comply with long-term emissions regulations, and a 220 PS (162 kW) 6-cylinder engine became an option for 8-ton trucks. The design of the front grille was changed to incorporate a hexagonal mesh pattern. Additional engine options for 8-ton trucks were added in July 2011: a 240 PS (177 kW) 6-cylinder and a 270 PS (199 kW) 6-cylinder.

This generation was produced in 2013 and replaced with another facelift in 2018 for the Indonesian market. The 2013 model uses the 6D16-T7 engine producing 250 PS (184 kW), whereas the 2018 model uses the Euro 4-compliant 6M60 outputting 240–270 PS (177–199 kW). Both models use the Eaton ES-11109 9-speed gearbox.

== Third generation (2026-present) ==
On 26 August 2026, as part of its transition from Mitsubishi Fuso to Hino Motors, the third generation Fighter was introduced. It is now a rebadged version of the Hino Ranger, with unique front fascia and new cab.

== Body type ==
- Fighter mid-size
- Fighter mid-size NX
- Fighter mid-size CNG
- Fighter big-size narrow cab (see big-size wide cab by Mitsubishi Fuso Super Great)
- Fighter big-size narrow cab 4WD

== Models ==
=== Philippines ===
- Fighter FK
  - FK-MR
  - FK-SR
  - FK-HR
  - FK200
  - FK417
- Fighter FM
  - FM 657 H
  - FM 657 N
  - Fire Truck

=== Indonesia ===
- Fighter FM
  - FM 515
  - FM 516
  - FM 517 H2
  - FM 517 H3
  - FM 517 L
  - FM 517 HS
  - FM 517 HL
  - FM 557 DR
  - FM 65 FS
  - FM 65 FL
  - FM 65 TRACTOR
- Fighter FN
  - FN 517 HL
  - FN 517 ML
  - FN 517 ML2
  - FN 527 M2
  - FN 527 M3
  - FN 527 M2L
  - FN 527 M3L
  - FN 527 ML
  - FN 527 MS
  - FN 617
  - FN 627
  - FN 61 FS
  - FN 61 FM
  - FN 62 F

=== Thailand ===
- Fighter FK
  - FK 415
  - FK 415 H
  - FK 455
  - FK 455 H
  - FK 455 F
  - FK 457 J
  - FK 457 F
  - FK 457 H
  - FK 457 M
  - FK 458
  - FK 458 F
  - FK 458 H
- Fighter FN
  - FN 515
  - FN 516
  - FN 517
  - FN 517 M
  - FN 527 S
  - FN 527 SR
  - FN 527 M
  - FN 527 H
  - FN 528
  - FN 627

=== Japan, US, and Canada ===
- Fighter FK
  - FK-MR
  - FK-SR
  - FK-HR
  - FK-HD
  - THE FK-HD 455
  - FK200
  - FK417
- Fighter FM
  - FM-HD
  - FM-MR
  - FM-SR
  - FM-HR
  - FM 64 F
  - FM 260
  - FM 330
  - FM 555
  - FM 555 F
  - FM 557
  - FM 617
  - FM 617 L

=== New Zealand ===
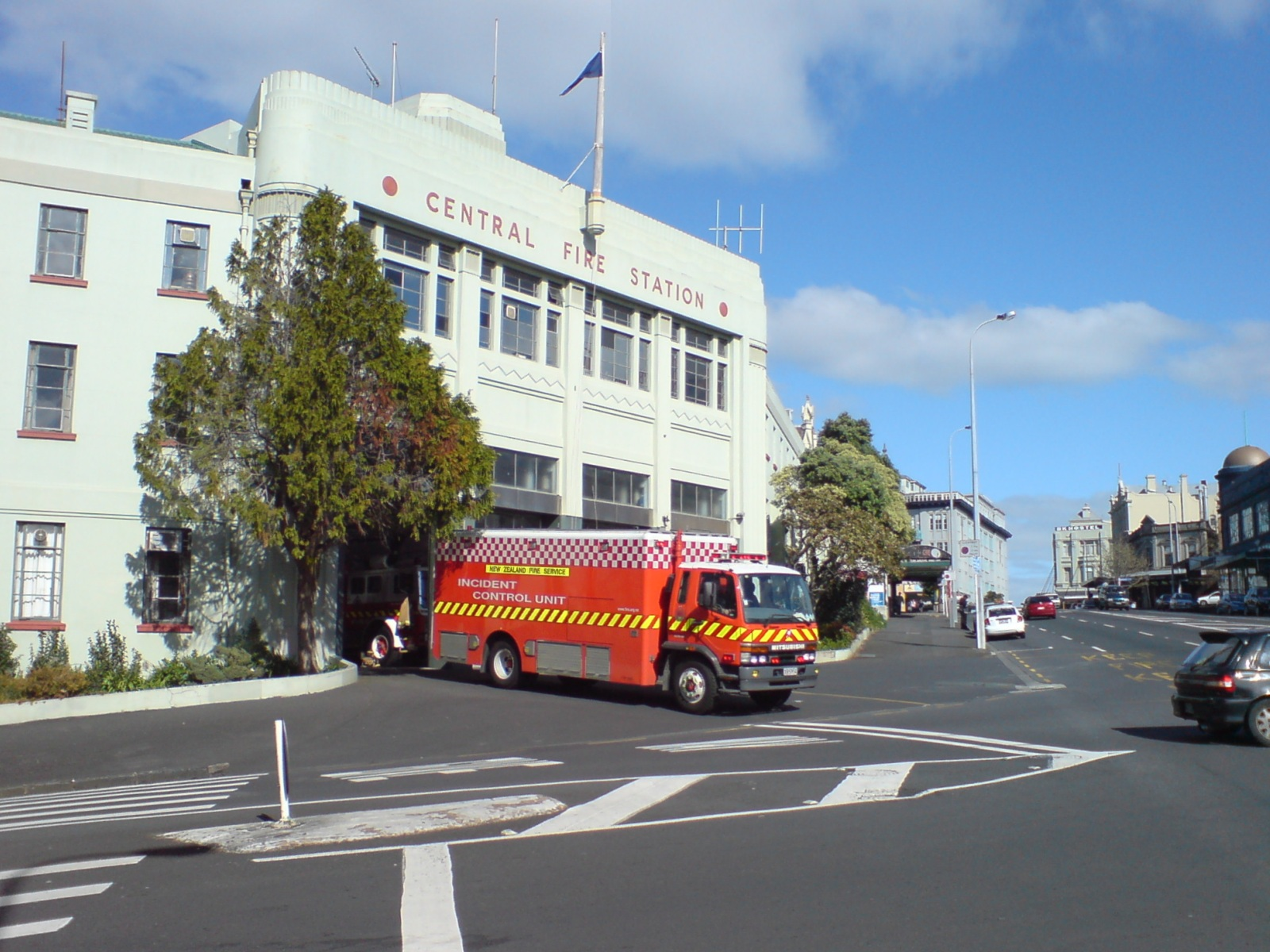
Fighter FK in New Zealand

- 4X2 Fighter
  - FK200K1
  - FK200K6
  - FK200H6
  - FK250L6
  - FM250H6
  - FM250M6
  - FM250A6
  - FM280H6
  - FM280M6
- 6x2 Fighter
  - FM220R2
  - FU220R2
  - FU250L6
  - FU250R6
  - FU280U6
- 6X4 Fighter
  - FN280K6
  - FN280U6

=== Australia ===
All Australian models are equipped with a manual transmission unless stated otherwise.

- Fighter FK
  - 1024 SWB/MWB/LWB/XLWB
  - 1024 Auto LWB
  - 1024 Crew Cab MWB
  - 1224 SWB/LWB
  - 1224 Auto SWB
  - 1227 LWB/XLWB
  - 1424 LWB
  - 1427 XLWB
- Fighter FM
  - 1627 SWB/XLWB/XXLWB
  - 1627 Auto XLWB/XXLWB
- Fighter FN
  - 2427 XLWB/XXLWB
  - 2427 Auto XLWB/XXLWB

=== Engine ===
For details, see List of Mitsubishi Fuso engines.

- 4M50-T5/4M50-T6 - 180 or 210 PS (130 or 150 kW)
- 6D14
- 6D15
- 6D16-T2 - 220 PS (160 kW) @ 2800 rpm, 687N•m @ 1400 rpm
- 6D16-T7 - 255 PS (188 kW)
- 6D17 - 8202cc, 118 x 125mm, 225 PS (165 kW)
- 6M60-T1 - 240 PS (180 kW) @ 2600 rpm, 686N•m @ 1400 rpm
- 6M60-T2 - 270 PS (200 kW) @ 2600 rpm, 785N•m @ 1400 rpm
- 6M60-T2 - 280 PS (210 kW) @ 2600 rpm, 801N•m @ 1400 rpm
- 6M60-T2 (new) - 270 PS (200 kW) @ 2500 rpm, 785N•m @ 1100~2400 rpm
- 6M60-T3 - 220 PS (160 kW) @ 2200 rpm, 745N•m @ 1400~2000 rpm
- 6M61 (CNG) - 225 PS (165 kW)
