= Mitsubishi Fuso =

Mitsubishi Fuso may refer to:

- Fuso (company), officially Mitsubishi Fuso Truck and Bus Corporation
  - Fuso Trucks America, formerly Mitsubishi Fuso Trucks America
- Mitsubishi Fuso Fighter, earlier models marketed as Mitsubishi Fuso in Indonesia
