= List of Mitsubishi Fuso engines =

This is a list of all engines produced or used by Mitsubishi Fuso Truck and Bus Corporation. All engines are diesel unless stated otherwise.

== Gasoline engines ==
The JH4 was an F-head engine based on the Willys Hurricane engine and its predecessor Willys Go-Devil sidevalve four, and was used to power early Mitsubishi Jeeps as well as Mitsubishi Fuso trucks and buses. It was of 2.2 L (2,199 cc), had 69 HP and formed the basis for the KE31, a diesel engine of the same dimensions.

Several other engines had been taken over from Mitsubishi Motors.

== Diesel engines ==
=== Four Cylinders ===
==== KE series ====
- KE31 – 2199 cc, bore × stroke is 79.375 mm × 111.125 mm (3.13 in × 4.38 in), peak power is 61 PS (45 kW) at 3,600 rpm. Mainly fitted to the Mitsubishi Jeep, this engine has its roots in the JH4 design. The six-cylinder KE36 with 3.3 L is based on the KE31 and shares that engine's dimensions.

==== 4DQx ====
- 4DQ1 – 1986 cc, peak power is 68 PS (50 kW). Fitted to the T720 Mitsubishi Canter from 1963 on (as the 4DQ11A), this engine was replaced by the 4DR1 in 1968.

==== 4DRx ====
- 4DR1 2384 cc, OHV, 2 valves per cylinder, crossflow cylinder head design. Peak power is 75 PS (55 kW) at 3800 rpm. Bore and stroke is 88 × 98 mm. Introduced in June 1968 for the T90-series Canter.
- 4DR5/6 2659 cc, Bore × stroke is 92 × 100 mm. The 4DR5 has indirect injection and 20:1 compression ratio. Naturally aspirated, its peak power is 80 PS (59 kW) at 3800 rpm with peak torque of 18kgm at 2200rpm. The 4DR6 is a direct injection turbo version with 17.5:1 compression ratio and Mitsubishi TD04-1 turbocharger that produced up to 94 PS (69 kW) and 21.0kgm of torque. Both of these engines were used in large forklift trucks, as well as Canter models and the Mitsubishi J20 and J50 series Jeep. The final iteration of the 4DR5 fitted to the J25 Jeep had 21.5:1 compression and was turbocharged and intercooled, developing 100 PS.
- 4DR7 2835 cc, peak power is 88 PS (65 kW) – according to some, this is a 2.5 L with 70 PS (51 kW)

==== 4D3x ====
The 4D3x is a series of 4-cylinder OHV diesel engines.

- 4D30 – 3298 cc, bore 100 mm × stroke 105 mm, naturally aspirated, indirect injection 90–95 PS (66–70 kW). European models claimed 80 PS (59 kW) DIN.
- 4D31 – 3298 cc, bore 100 mm × stroke 105 mm, Naturally aspirated or turbo charged, direct injection,100–130 PS (74–96 kW)
- 4D32 – 3567 cc, bore 104 mm × stroke 105 mm, 110 PS (81 kW)
- 4D33 – 4214 cc, bore 108 mm × stroke 115 mm, naturally aspirated, ohv gear driven camshaft, direct injection with in-line injection pump. In the Canter trucks (General export model) this engine serves as a standard and outputs 83 kW (113 PS) at 3200 rpm resp. 304 Nm at 1600 rpm, but output may vary slightly on other trucks/in other markets due to e.g. indicating gross power 120–135 PS (88–99 kW).
- 4D34 – 3907 cc, bore 104 mm × stroke 115 mm, turbo charged. In 2017, the 4D34 engines, e.g. in the Philippines, comply with Euro 2. In Europe, they were replaced with the introduction of Euro 5. Peak power is 120 PS (88 kW). The turbocharged T4 has 165 PS (121 kW). Known versions:

4D34-2AT4 – 100 kW (136 PS) at 2900 rpm, 370 Nm at 1600 rpm, option on Canter 6.0 – 8.2 ton (General export model)
4D34-2AT5 – 81 kW (110 PS) at 2900 rpm, 275 Nm at 1600 rpm, option on Canter 4.4 – 6.0 ton (General export model)
4D34-2AT7 – 100 kW (136 PS) at 2900 rpm, 373 Nm at 1600 rpm, Canter 8.25 ton (General export model Indonesia)
4D34-2AT8 – 92 kW (125 PS) at 2900 rpm, 324 Nm at 1600 rpm, Canter 7.5 ton (General export model Indonesia)

- 4D35 – 4.56 L, 140 PS (103 kW)
- 4D36 – 3.56 L
- 4D37 – 3907 cc, common rail, four valves per cylinder, OHV gear driven camshaft

- 100 kW at 2500 rpm, 420 Nm at 1500 rpm

- ~2020–present Fuso FA/FI, Euro IV/V with SCR

- 125 kW at 2500 rpm, 520 Nm at 1500 rpm

==== 4M4x ====
- 4M40 – 2835 cc. Inline-four cylinder, OHC, natural aspiration, and swirl combustion. Introduced with the 6th generation of the Canter in September 1996, the engine produced 69 kW (94 PS) and 191 Nm at 2000 rpm. The injection pump may be of the rotary type. Late engines complied to Euro 2. It replaced the 2.5-liter 4D56 in the lightest-duty Canters.
- 4M41 – this engine is of 3200 cc. Four cylinders, DOHC, swirl combustion and a rotary injection pump. They complied to Euro 2 and were equipped to the Canter from 02/1999 thru 09/2001 producing 85 kW and 216 Nm at 2000 rpm.
- 4M42-AOT – 2977 cc. Another 4-cylinder with DOHC, direct injection, a Bosch VP44 rotary injection pump with electronic control, turbocharging, and intercooling. With EGR they complied to Euro 3 and were equipped to the Canter from 09/2001 performing 92 kW at 3200 rpm and 294 Nm at 1800 rpm. Starting from 10/2007 the engine was modified to common rail injection, VNT charging and a Diesel particulate filter was added to meet Euro 4. On the Canter they were replaced by the 4P10 in 07/2009.

==== 4M5x ====
The 4M50 is a series of 4-cylinder diesel engines with 4899 cc, bore × stroke 114 mm × 120 mm (4.49 in × 4.72 in), gear driven, DOHC 4 valves per cylinder, and common rail direct injection with turbocharging and intercooler.

- 4M50-T3 – 103 kW (140 PS), 412 N⋅m (304 lb⋅ft)

02/2004- Mitsubishi Fuso Canter

- 4M50-4AT4 – 110 kW (150 PS) at 2700 rpm, 442 N⋅m (326 lb⋅ft) at 1600 rpm
- 4M50-T4 – 118 kW (160 PS), 470 N⋅m (347 lb⋅ft)

02/2004– Mitsubishi Fuso Canter

- 4M50-T5 or 4M50-5AT5 – 132 kW (180 PS) at 2700 rpm, 530 N⋅m (391 lb⋅ft) at 1600 rpm

02/2004– Mitsubishi Fuso Canter
Rosa
10/2004 – 06/2008 Nissan Civilian

The 4M51 is a bored out version of the 4M50 with 5249 cc from a bore and stroke of 118 mm × 120 mm (4.65 in × 4.72 in). It is a four-cylinder diesel engine producing 140–155 PS (103–114 kW).

==== 4P1x ====
The 4P10 is a 2998 cc turbodiesel engine purchased by Daimler from FPT Industrial for the Mitsubishi Fuso Canter since 2009. Essentially it is a Fiat F1C. The 4P10 with common rail fuel system and high pressure piezo-injectors meets Euro 6 emission norms with Bluetec selective catalytic reduction system and was introduced as the new "Global Powertrain" for the Canter. Since the "General Export Models" retained the old Mitsubishi engines, the utilization of the "Global Powertrain" was limited to highly developed countries with strict exhaust gas emission limitations, e.g. Japan (starting with the 8th generation of the Canter only), Europe, and North America. In 2020, a revised version with improvements on torque, fuel economy and exhaust gas emissions appeared in Japan for the Canter under the denomination 4P10+.

4P10T2 – 130 PS (96 kW) at 3500 rpm, 300 N⋅m (221 lb⋅ft) at 1300 rpm in Europe,
4P10T4 – 150 PS (110 kW) at 3500 rpm, 370 N⋅m (273 lb⋅ft) at 1320 rpm in Europe
4P10T5 – 161 hp (120 kW) at 3400 rpm, 489 N⋅m (361 lb⋅ft) at 1300 rpm, 2 turbochargers in NFTA
4P10T6 – 175 PS (129 kW) at 3500 rpm, 430 N⋅m (317 lb⋅ft) at 1600 rpm in Europe
4P10T1+ – 110 PS (81 kW) at 2130 rpm, 430 N⋅m (317 lb⋅ft) Nm at 1600 rpm, in Japan for 1.5 ton Canter
4P10T2+ – 130 PS (96 kW) at 2130 rpm, 430 N⋅m (317 lb⋅ft) Nm at 1600–2130 rpm, in Japan for Canter
4P10T4+ – 150 PS (110 kW) at 2440 rpm, 430 N⋅m (317 lb⋅ft) Nm at 1600–2440 rpm, in Japan for Canter
4P10T6+ – 175 PS (129 kW) at 2860 rpm, 430 N⋅m (317 lb⋅ft) Nm at 1600–2860 rpm, in Japan for Canter

Applications
Mitsubishi Fuso Canter
Mitsubishi Fuso Rosa
Nissan Civilian
Temsa Prestij

==== 4V2x ====
Bore 104 mm × stroke 115 mm, 3907 cc, OHV, gear-driven camshaft, based on the 4D37 engine. Common rail direct injection, turbo with intercooler.

- 4V20 – 125 kW (170 PS) at 2,500 rpm, 520 N⋅m (384 lb⋅ft) 1,500 rpm – with SCR and DPF

~2020–present Fuso Fighter (JDM)

- 4V21 – 100 kW (136 PS) at 2,500 rpm, 420 N⋅m (310 lb⋅ft) 1,500 rpm – Euro IV

~2020–present Fuso Canter (export model)

=== Six Cylinder ===
==== KE series ====
- KE36 – 3,299 cc, bore × stroke is 79.375 × 111.125 mm, peak power is 85 PS (63 kW). Mostly a six-cylinder version of the KE31, this engine saw use in the heavier (3.5 ton) version of the Mitsubishi Jupiter.

==== DB series ====
- DB5A – peak power is 130 PS (96 kW)
- DB31A – peak power is 155–165 PS (114–121 kW)
- 6DB1 – 8550 cc, peak power is 165 PS (121 kW) at 2300 rpm. Also called 6DB10A, and in turbocharged form (6DB1AT), it produces 220 PS (162 kW). The turbo version first appeared in 1965.

==== DH series ====
The inline-six DH-series diesel engines were used in heavy-duty trucks beginning in 1952 with the W21. The engine name included the max power, so that the DH21 is of 210 PS (154 kW).

==== 6DCx ====
- 6DC2 – 9,955 cc V6, peak power is 200 PS (147 kW). This engine has the same internal dimensions as the eight-cylinder 8DC2 and was first introduced in 1967 with indirect injection, Mitsubishi Fuso F-series.

==== 6DRx ====
- 6DR5 – 3,988 cc, peak power is 105 PS (77 kW) at 3,500 rpm. Bore and stroke is 92 × 100 mm (as for the 4DR5). A forklift version only has 70 PS (51 kW) at 2200 rpm.

Applications:
Mitsubishi Fuso Canter
Mitsubishi Fuso Rosa
Mitsubishi Fuso Jupiter T44
1978–1979 Dodge D150/D200, W150/W200 (not available in California; 1979 is uncertain)
1979 Dodge B100/B200/B300 (cancelled)

==== 6DSx ====
- 6DS1 – 4678 cc, peak power is from 110 to 120 PS (81 to 88 kW)
- 6DS3 – peak power is 125 PS (92 kW)
- 6DS5 – peak power is from 122 to 130 PS (90 to 96 kW)
- 6DS7 – 5430 cc, peak power is 135 PS (99 kW)

==== 6D1x ====
- 6D10 – 5974 cc, peak power is 145 PS (107 kW) at 3200 rpm.
- 6D11 – 6754 cc, peak power is 155 PS (114 kW) at 2800 rpm.
- 6D14 – 6557 cc, bore 100 mm × stroke 115 mm, peak power is 155–160 PS (114–118 kW), while the turbocharged 6D14(T) has 195 PS (143 kW).
- 6D15 – 6920 cc, bore 113 mm × stroke 115 mm, peak power is 170–175 PS (125–129 kW), while the turbocharged 6D15(T2) has 230 PS (169 kW). The T3 has 245 PS (180 kW).
- 6D16 – 7545 cc, bore 118 mm × stroke 115 mm, ohv gear driven camshaft, direct injection with in-line injection pump, peak power is 170–185 PS (125–136 kW), n/a, turbo and turbo with intercooler

6D16-1A – turbocharged, 140 kW (190 PS) @ 2900rpm and 520 Nm @ 1400rpm
6D16-3AT3 – turbocharged, intercooled, 145 kW (197 PS) @ 2600rpm and 575 N⋅m (424 lb⋅ft) @ 1400rpm
6D16-T2 – 220ps/2800rpm 687N•m/1400rpm, Fuso Fighter
6D16-T5 – turbocharged, 255 PS (188 kW)
6D16-T7 – 255ps, Fuso Fighter

- 6D17 – 8201 cc, bore 118 × stroke 125 mm, peak power is 210 PS (154 kW) while the cleaner 6D17-II has 200 PS (147 kW), 225ps on Fuso Fighter

==== 6D2x ====
- 6D20 – 10,308 cc, peak power is 215 PS (158 kW) at 2500 rpm, with torque of 70.0 kg⋅m (686 N⋅m; 506 lb⋅ft) at 1600 rpm, introduced in 1975, Mitsubishi Fuso F-series.
- 6D22 – 11,149 cc

naturally aspirated – 225 PS (165 kW), Mitsubishi Fuso The Great
6D22-T0 – 270 PS (199 kW), The Great
6D22-T1 – 285 PS (210 kW), The Great
6D22-T2 – 310 PS (228 kW), The Great
6D22-T6 – 280 PS (206 kW), The Great
6D22-T7 – 310 PS (228 kW), torque of 117 kg⋅m (1,147 N⋅m; 846 lb⋅ft), introduced 1988

- 6D24 – 11,945 cc, bore × stroke is 130 × 150 mm, ohv, gear driven camshaft, direct injection with in-line injection pump

naturally aspirated 240 PS (177 kW) at 2,200 rpm, 85 kg⋅m (834 N⋅m; 615 lb⋅ft) at 1,400 rpm
6D24-T1 – 300 PS (221 kW) or 320 PS (235 kW) at 2,200 rpm, 1,177 N⋅m (868 lbf⋅ft) at 1,400 rpm, Mitsubishi Fuso The Great, Mitsubishi Fuso Super Great
6D24-T? – 330 PS (243 kW), Mitsubishi Fuso The Great
6D24-T2 – 350 PS (257 kW) at 2,200 rpm, 1,422 N⋅m (1,049 lbf⋅ft) at 1,400 rpm, Mitsubishi Fuso Super Great

==== 6D3x ====
4.9 L – 5.9 L

==== 6D4x ====
- 6D40 – 12,023 cc, 24 valves, bore × stroke is 135mm × 140mm,

6D40-T1 – turbocharged+intercooled, 350 PS (257 kW) at 2200, 142 kg⋅m (1,393 N⋅m; 1,027 lb⋅ft) at 1300
6D40-T1 (II) – turbocharged+intercooled, 360 PS (265 kW) at 2200, 147 kg⋅m (1,442 N⋅m; 1,063 lb⋅ft) at 1200, Mitsubishi Fuso Super Great
6D40-T3 – turbocharged+intercooled 390 PS (287 kW) at 2200, 180 kg⋅m (1,765 N⋅m; 1,302 lb⋅ft) at 1200, Mitsubishi Fuso Super Great
6D40-T3 – VGT-charged 390 PS (287 kW), Mitsubishi Fuso The Great

==== 6M6x ====
- 6M6 – 7,545 cc, bore × stroke is 118mm × 115mm, inline six-cylinder turbocharged and intercooled diesel engine, gear-driven SOHC, common rail injection. Successor of the 6D16 engine, 2010–present JDM version, 2018 on Fuso Fighter in South Africa

6M60-T1 or 6M60-1AT1 – peak power is 240 PS (177 kW) at 2,600 rpm, torque is 686 N⋅m (70.0 kg⋅m; 506 lb⋅ft) at 1,400 rpm (Fuso Fighter)
6M60-T2 or 6M60-1AT2 – peak power is 270 PS (199 kW) at 2,600 rpm, torque is 785 N⋅m (80.0 kg⋅m; 579 lb⋅ft) at 1,400 rpm, (Fuso Fighter), 280 PS (206 kW) at 2,600 rpm 801Nm/1400rpm (Fighter), new/later 199 kW (270 PS) at 2,500 rpm 785Nm/1100–2400rpm (Fighter)
6M60-T3 – peak power is 220 PS (162 kW) at 2,200 rpm, torque is 745Nm/1400–2000rpm (Fighter)
6M60-T4 – 220 PS (162 kW) at 2,070 rpm, 745 Nm at 950-2070 rpm, on ~2020–present Japanese Fighter
6M60-T5 – 240 PS (177 kW) at 2,270 rpm, 745 Nm at 950-2270 rpm, on ~2020–present Japanese Fighter
6M60-T6 – 270 PS (199 kW) at 2,500 rpm, 785 Nm at 1100-2400 rpm, on ~2020–present Japanese Fighter

- 6M61 – 8,201 cc, bore 118 × stroke 125 mm, peak power is 190 PS (140 kW) (CNG), 225 PS (165 kW) (naturally aspirated)
- 6M61-A – 8,201 cc, peak power is 225 PS (165 kW) (CNG), 290 PS (213 kW) inline six-cylinder turbocharged and intercooled diesel engine.

==== 6M7x ====
- 6M70 – 12,882 cc, bore × stroke is 135mm × 150mm, first version:

6M70-T1 - peak power is 320 PS (235 kW) at 2,200 rpm, torque is 130 kg⋅m (1,275 N⋅m; 940 lb⋅ft) at 1,200 rpm
6M70-T2 - peak power is 350 PS (257 kW) at 2,200 rpm, torque is 165 kg⋅m (1,618 N⋅m; 1,193 lb⋅ft) at 1,200 rpm
6M70-T5 - peak power is 410 PS (302 kW) at 2,200 rpm, torque is 220 kg⋅m (2,157 N⋅m; 1,591 lb⋅ft) at 1,200 rpm

- 6M70 – Second version:

6M70-T3 – peak power is 380 PS (279 kW) at 2,000 rpm, torque is 185 kg⋅m (1,814 N⋅m; 1,338 lb⋅ft) at 1,100 rpm
6M70-T4 – peak power is 420 PS (309 kW) at 2,000 rpm, torque is 185 kg⋅m (1,814 N⋅m; 1,338 lb⋅ft) at 1,100 rpm
6M70-T5 – peak power is 460 PS (338 kW) at 2,000 rpm, torque is 220 kg⋅m (2,157 N⋅m; 1,591 lb⋅ft) at 1,100 rpm
6M70-T8 – peak power is 380 PS (279 kW) at 2,000 rpm, torque is 220 kg⋅m (2,157 N⋅m; 1,591 lb⋅ft) at 1,100 rpm
6M70-T7 – peak power is 520 PS (382 kW) at 2,000 rpm, torque is 220 kg⋅m (2,157 N⋅m; 1,591 lb⋅ft) at 1,100 rpm

==== 6R1x ====
- 6R10 – 12,808 cc, bore × stroke is 132mm × 156mm, mutually developed with Daimler OM 471, in contrast to OM471 with a conventional turbocharger, the 6R10 features a VGT.

6R10-T2 – peak power is 350 PS (257 kW) at 1,800 rpm, torque is 185 kg⋅m (1,814 N⋅m; 1,338 lb⋅ft) at 1,200 rpm
6R10-T3 – peak power is 380 PS (279 kW) at 1,800 rpm, torque is 185 kg⋅m (1,814 N⋅m; 1,338 lb⋅ft) at 1,200 rpm
6R10-T4 – peak power is 420 PS (309 kW) at 1,800 rpm, torque is 185 kg⋅m (1,814 N⋅m; 1,338 lb⋅ft) at 1,200 rpm
6R10-T5 – used in Mitsubishi Fuso Super Great
6R10-T6 – peak power is 460 PS (338 kW) at 1,800 rpm, torque is 220 kg⋅m (2,157 N⋅m; 1,591 lb⋅ft) at 1,200 rpm, Mitsubishi Fuso Super Great
6R10-T7 – peak power is 520 PS (382 kW) at 1,800 rpm, torque is 255 kg⋅m (2,501 N⋅m; 1,844 lb⋅ft) at 1,200 rpm, Mitsubishi Fuso Super Great
6R10-T8 – peak power is 460 PS (338 kW) at 1,800 rpm, torque is 255 kg⋅m (2,501 N⋅m; 1,844 lb⋅ft) at 1,200 rpm, Mitsubishi Fuso Super Great

==== 6R2x ====
The 6R20 is a series of inline six-cylinder diesel engines with 10,677 cc, bore 125mm × stroke 145mm, mutually developed with Daimler OM 470.

- 2017–present Aero Queen
- 2017–present Ace Tour
- 6R20T2 290 kW (390 hp) @ 1600 rpm, 2,000 N⋅m (1,500 lbf⋅ft) @ 1100 rpm

2017–present SuperGreat

==== 6S1x ====
- 6S10 7,698 cc, bore x stroke is 110mm x 135mm, mutually developed with Daimler OM 936

used on 2017–present SuperGreat, 2017–present Aero Queen, 2017–present Ace Tour

==== 6S2x ====
The 6S2x is a series of 6,373 cc six-cylinder turbocharged and intercooled diesel engines with 3 valves per cylinder, ECU, direct injection and inline injection pump. In 2020, they received Euro IV/V compliance with the help of SCR. Related to Mercedes Benz OM906.

- 6S20-T1 170 kW (231 PS) @ 2,200 rpm, 810 N⋅m (600 lbf⋅ft) @ 1,200–1800 rpm

~2020–present Fuso FZ

- 6S20-T2 205 kW (279 PS) @ 2,200 rpm, 1,100 N⋅m (810 lbf⋅ft) @ 1,200–1600 rpm

~2020–present Fuso FO
~2020–present Fuso FZ

- 175 kW (238 PS) @ 2,200 rpm, 850 N⋅m (630 lbf⋅ft) @ 1,200–1600 rpm

~2020–present Fuso FJ

=== Eight Cylinder ===
==== 8DCxx ====
- 8DC2 – 13,273 cc, 250–265 PS (184–195 kW), indirect injection, Mitsubishi Fuso F-series, T-series, W-series
- 8DC20AD – 230 PS (169 kW).
- 8DC4 – 13,273 cc, 250–265 PS (184–195 kW), direct injection, Mitsubishi Fuso F-series.
- 8DC6 – 14,886 cc, 280–300 PS (206–221 kW), indirect injection, Mitsubishi Fuso F-series, Mitsubishi Fuso The Great
- 8DC7 – 13,804 cc, 280 PS (206 kW), direct injection, Mitsubishi Fuso F-series.
- 8DC8 – 14,886 cc, 275–305 PS (202–224 kW), direct injection, Mitsubishi Fuso F-series, Mitsubishi Fuso The Great
- 8DC9 – 16,031 cc, 135 × 140 mm

naturally aspirated – 300–320 PS (221–235 kW) @ 2200, 1,079 N⋅m (796 lbf⋅ft) @ 1400, Mitsubishi Fuso The Great, Mitsubishi Fuso Super Great
8DC9T – 360 PS (265 kW) (turbo), Mitsubishi Fuso F-series, Mitsubishi Fuso The Great
8DC9T – 380 PS (279 kW) (turbo), 142 kg⋅m (1,393 N⋅m; 1,027 lb⋅ft) Mitsubishi Fuso The Great
8DC9-T2 – twin turbocharged+intercooled, 440 PS (324 kW) at 2000, 160 kg⋅m (1,569 N⋅m; 1,157 lb⋅ft) at 1300, Mitsubishi Fuso The Great, Mitsubishi Fuso Super Great

- 8DC10 – 16,752 cc, 335 PS (246 kW), Mitsubishi Fuso The Great
- 8DC11 – 17,737 cc, 142 × 140 mm

8DC11-1 – naturally aspirated, 330 PS (243 kW) @ 2100, 1,179 N⋅m (870 lbf⋅ft) @ 1300, Mitsubishi Fuso Super Great
8DC11-2 – naturally aspirated, 355 PS (261 kW) @ 2200, 1,225 N⋅m (904 lbf⋅ft) @ 1300, Mitsubishi Fuso The Great, Mitsubishi Fuso Super Great
8DC11-3 – naturally aspirated, 365 PS (268 kW) @ 2200, 1,275 N⋅m (940 lbf⋅ft) @ 1300, Mitsubishi Fuso Super Great

==== 8M2x ====
- 8M20 – 20,089 cc, 146 × 150 mm

8M20-1 – naturally aspirated, 400 PS (294 kW) @ 2200, 1,470 N⋅m (150 kg⋅m; 1,084 lb⋅ft) at 1300 – Mitsubishi Fuso The Great, Mitsubishi Fuso Super Great
8M20-2 – naturally aspirated, 375 PS (276 kW) @ 2200, 1,323 N⋅m (135 kg⋅m; 976 lb⋅ft) at 1300 – Mitsubishi Fuso The Great, Mitsubishi Fuso Super Great
8M20-3 – naturally aspirated, 385 PS (283 kW) @ 2200, 1,353 N⋅m (138 kg⋅m; 998 lb⋅ft) at 1300 – Mitsubishi Fuso The Great, Mitsubishi Fuso Super Great

- 8M21 – 21,205 cc, 150 × 150 mm

8M21-1 – naturally aspirated, 370 PS (272 kW) @ 2200, 1,274 N⋅m (130 kg⋅m; 940 lb⋅ft) at 1200 – Mitsubishi Fuso Super Great
8M21-2 – naturally aspirated, 400 PS (294 kW) @ 2200, 1,392 N⋅m (142 kg⋅m; 1,027 lb⋅ft) at 1200 – Mitsubishi Fuso Super Great
8M21-3 – naturally aspirated, 420 PS (309 kW) @ 2200, 1,470 N⋅m (150 kg⋅m; 1,084 lb⋅ft) at 1300 – The Great, Mitsubishi Fuso Super Great
8M21-4 – naturally aspirated, 430 PS (316 kW) @ 2200, 1,519 N⋅m (155 kg⋅m; 1,120 lb⋅ft) at 1200 – Mitsubishi Fuso Super Great

- 8M22 – 19,004 cc, 142 × 150 mm

8M22-T1 – twin-turbo+intercooler, 550 PS (405 kW) at 2,000 rpm, 220 kg⋅m (2,157 N⋅m; 1,591 lb⋅ft) at 1,100 rpm – Mitsubishi Fuso Super Great
8M22-T2 – twin-turbo with intercooler, 480 PS (353 kW) at 2,000 rpm, 177 kg⋅m (1,736 N⋅m; 1,280 lb⋅ft) at 1,100 rpm – Mitsubishi Fuso Super Great

=== Ten Cylinder ===
==== 10DCx ====
The ten-cylinder 10DC engines share the dimensions of the 8DC series and were first seen in 1974, in the heavy-duty F-series trucks.

- 10DC6 – 18,608 cc, 375 PS (276 kW) at 2500 rpm.
- 10DC8 – 18,608 cc, 375–380 PS (276–279 kW), direct injection, torque is 130 kg⋅m (1,275 N⋅m; 940 lb⋅ft) for the 375PS version, Mitsubishi Fuso F-series.
- 10DC11 – 22,171 cc, 440 PS (324 kW), torque is 156 kg⋅m (1,530 N⋅m; 1,128 lb⋅ft), Mitsubishi Fuso The Great.

==== 10M2x ====
- 10M20 – 25,112 cc, 146 × 150 mm, naturally aspirated, 480 PS (353 kW) at 2,200 rpm, 1,735 N⋅m (1,280 lb⋅ft) at 1,300 rpm, Mitsubishi Fuso The Great, Mitsubishi Fuso Super Great
- 10M21 – 26,507 cc, 150 × 150 mm, naturally aspirated, 520 PS (382 kW) at 2,200 rpm, 185 kg⋅m (1,814 N⋅m; 1,338 lb⋅ft) at 1,200 rpm, Mitsubishi Fuso Super Great

=== Twelve Cylinder ===
- 12DC2 – 19,910 cc, bore × stroke is 130 mm × 125 mm (5.12 in × 4.92 in), peak power is 400 PS (294 kW) at 2,500 rpm, torque is 134 kg⋅m (1,314 N⋅m; 969 lb⋅ft) at 1,200 rpm. This is essentially two coupled 6DC2 six-cylinder engines.

== See also ==
- Mitsubishi Motors engines
