= Mitsubishi Fuso The Great =

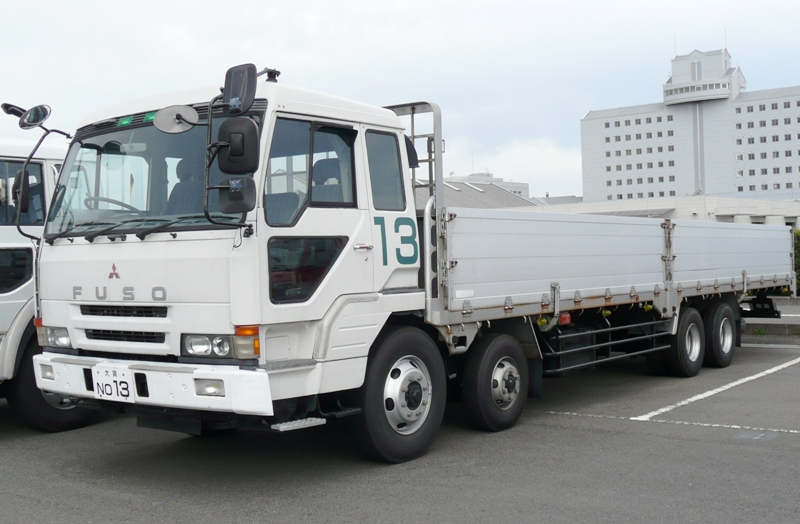
- Mitsubishi Fuso The Great (1993 facelift model)

Overview
- Manufacturer: Mitsubishi Motors Corporation
- Also called: Mitsubishi FP/FV/FT/FU; Hyundai 91A; Dongfeng
- Production: 1983–2001
- Assembly: Japan; Indonesia; Taiwan; China

Body and chassis
- Class: Heavy duty truck
- Body style: Cab-over truck
- Related: Hyundai 91A

Powertrain
- Engine: 6D22, 6D24, 6D40 I6; 8DC8, 8DC9, 8DC10, 8DC11, 8M20, 8M21 V8; 10DC11, 10M20 V10

Chronology
- Predecessor: Mitsubishi Fuso F-series
- Successor: Mitsubishi Fuso Super Great

Mitsubishi Fuso The Great is a heavy truck range manufactured and sold by Mitsubishi Motors Corporation (now Mitsubishi Fuso Truck and Bus Corporation) from 1983 until 2001. It is a gathering name for the FT, FV, and FU-series trucks. The Great succeeded the Mitsubishi F-series line of heavy trucks, and was gradually replaced by the Super Great which was introduced in 1996. The design language of The Great also defined the look of the succeeding generations of the Canter and Fighter trucks. The Great was also built as a tractor truck.

== History ==
The vehicle has also been produced under license in South Korea by the Hyundai Motor Company under the name Hyundai 91A, and by Dongfeng Liuqi in China. It has frequently been used as a basis for armored security vehicles by Japanese law enforcement, as a fire truck, and even in competition: The Greats participated in the 1997 Dakar–Dakar Rally, finishing fifth and sixth in the truck (T4-2) category with teams headed by veteran French drivers Gilbert Versino and Christophe Granjon. This was enough to finish 38th and 41st overall amongst the four-wheeled competitors. While both Greats entered finished, the result was overshadowed by competitors Hino's triple victory and Mitsubishi did not return to Dakar with heavyin the truck category.

In export markets, the name "The Great" was not typically used, with Mitsubishi selling them using the model code names.

== Development ==
July 1983

Introduced. The headlights were rectangular, inset in larger, clear plastic rectangles. Export models for certain markets and special vehicles such as snowplows used four, easier to replace, round headlights. It was designed to be more easy to use, with single-key operation, a steering lock, and no battery relay switch.

September 1983

An 8-ton semi-tractor with the six-cylinder 6D22(T3) engine was added (FP-R).

November 1983

The heavier, 6x4 FV-R semi-tractor was added, fitted with the 8DC9 or turbocharged 8DC9(T) V8 engine.

November 1984

The twin-turbo, intercooler 8DC9(T2) V8 engine was introduced.

July 1986

Minor facelift with a larger grille, extending up above the headlamps onto the bonnet; the 8DC11 engine was introduced. In December 1986, new safety and drive-by noise regulations were addressed by the addition of sound damping, seat belts, and laminated windshield glass.

May 1989

Added the 440 PS (324 kW) 10DC11 engine.

December 1989

Facelift, with redesigned grille, now compliant with Japan's 1989 exhaust gas regulations. The FUSO emblem is somewhat smaller and is now attached to the black stripe above the grille.

July 1991

ABS brakes made standard equipment on tractor units.

October 1991

8M20 engine model available.

July 1993

Major revision, heralding the design later seen on the later Super Great, using projector headlights shared with the second generation Fighter. The dashboard was given a more rounded design.

December 1994

Made compliant with 1994 exhaust gas regulations. A new 22-25 tonne GVWR series of vehicles was added, called the "Z Series". These feature a front grille in the same color as the cab. The 8M21 engine was introduced.

April 1995

The tractor underwent minor changes to accommodate Japan's relaxation of regulations on total vehicle weight.

May 1996

The model was replaced by the Super Great. However, production of export and off-highway vehicles continued.

2001

Production of off-highway and export market vehicles came to an end.

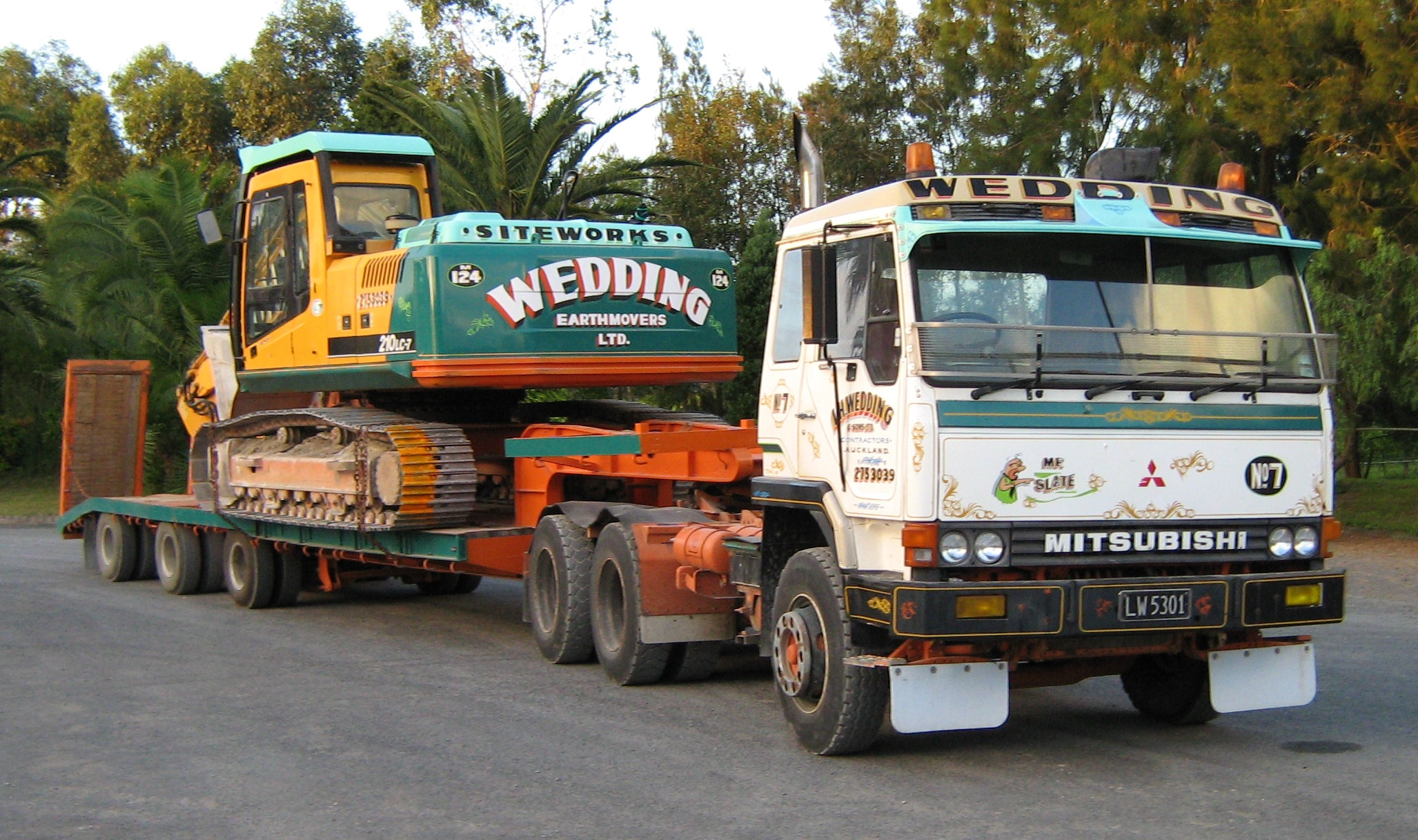
1984 early round headlight export model.

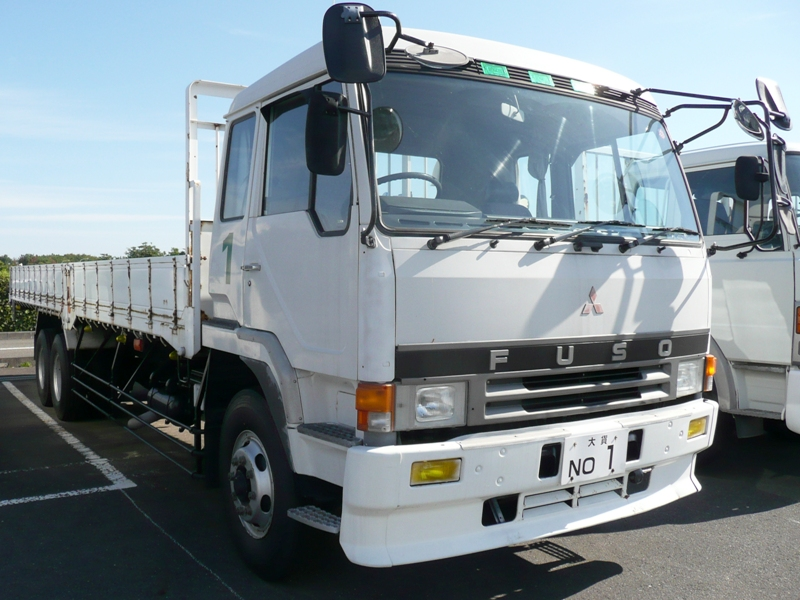
1990–1993 (second) facelift model, here as an FV, straight cargo truck

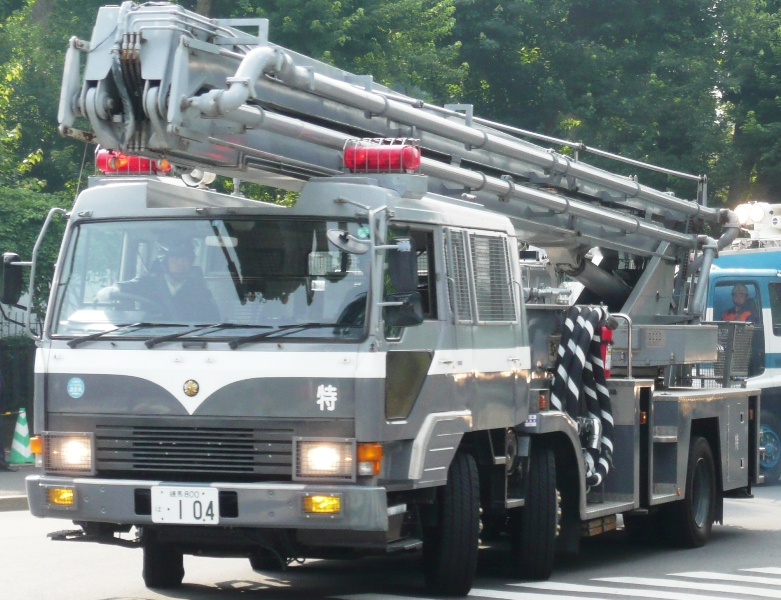
Special use version: a water cannon belonging to the Tokyo Metropolitan Police Department

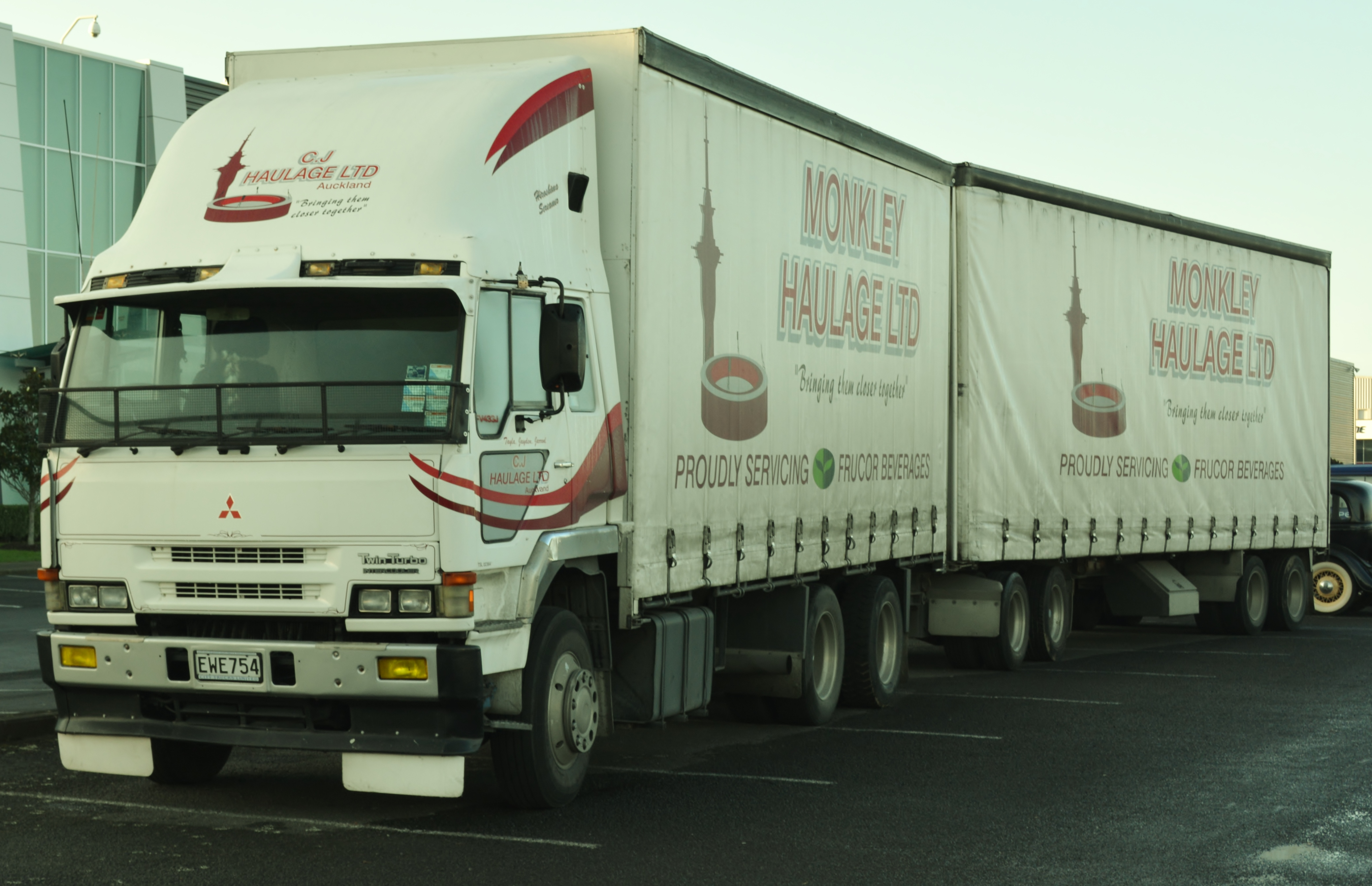
1996 Mitsubishi FV433J, export model (New Zealand)

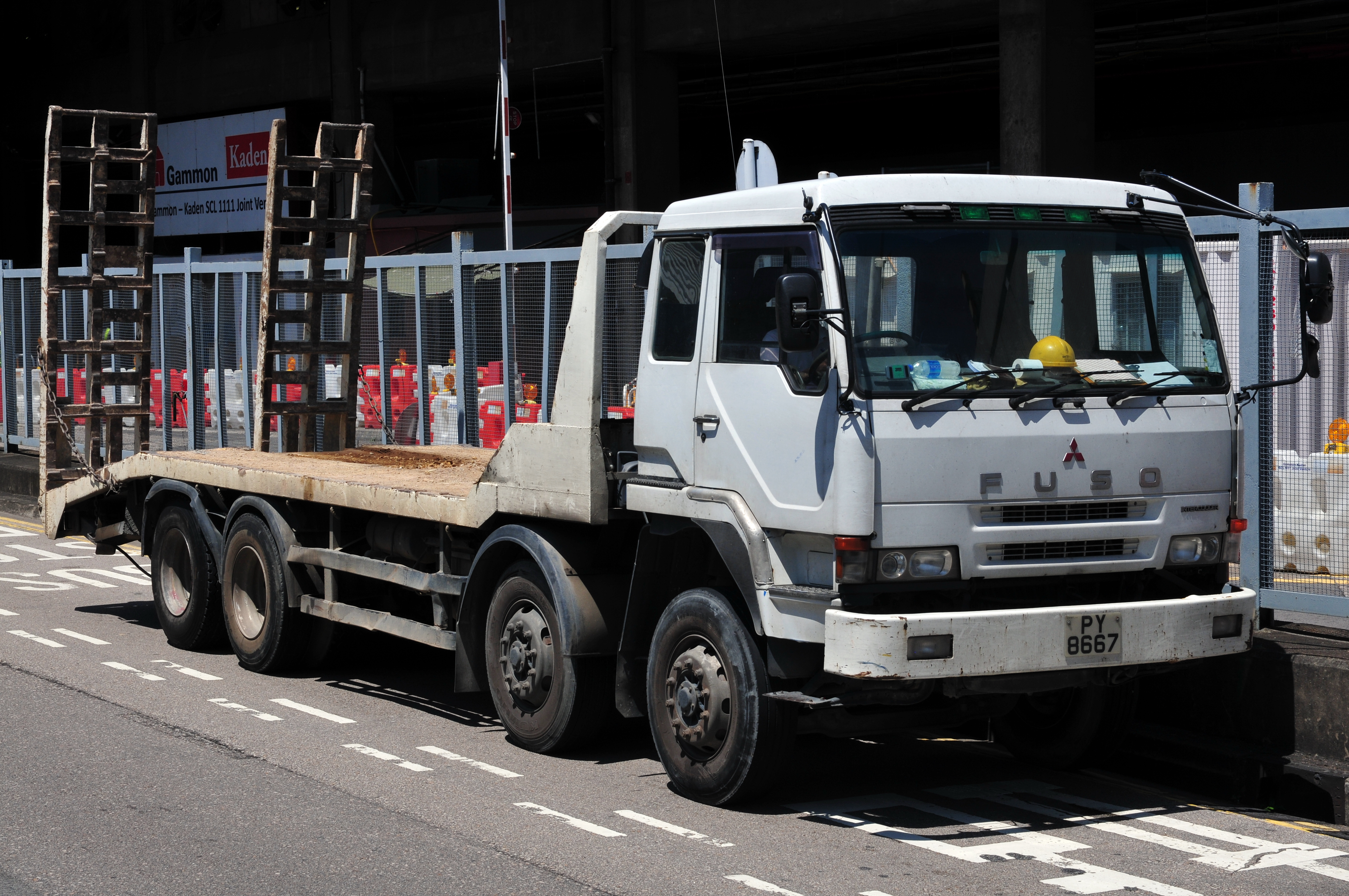
1993–2001, final facelift model with projector headlamps and new grille

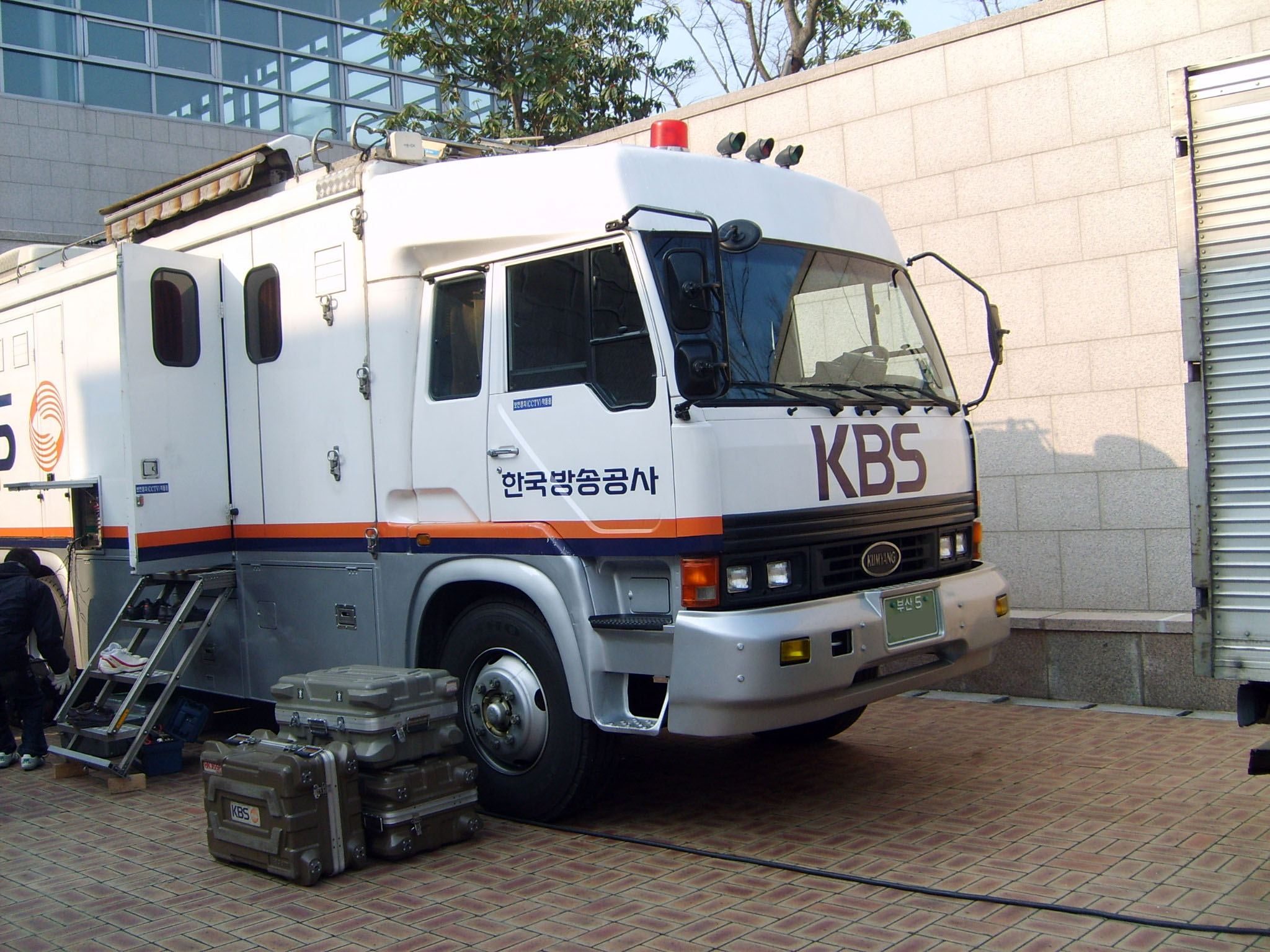
Hyundai 91A

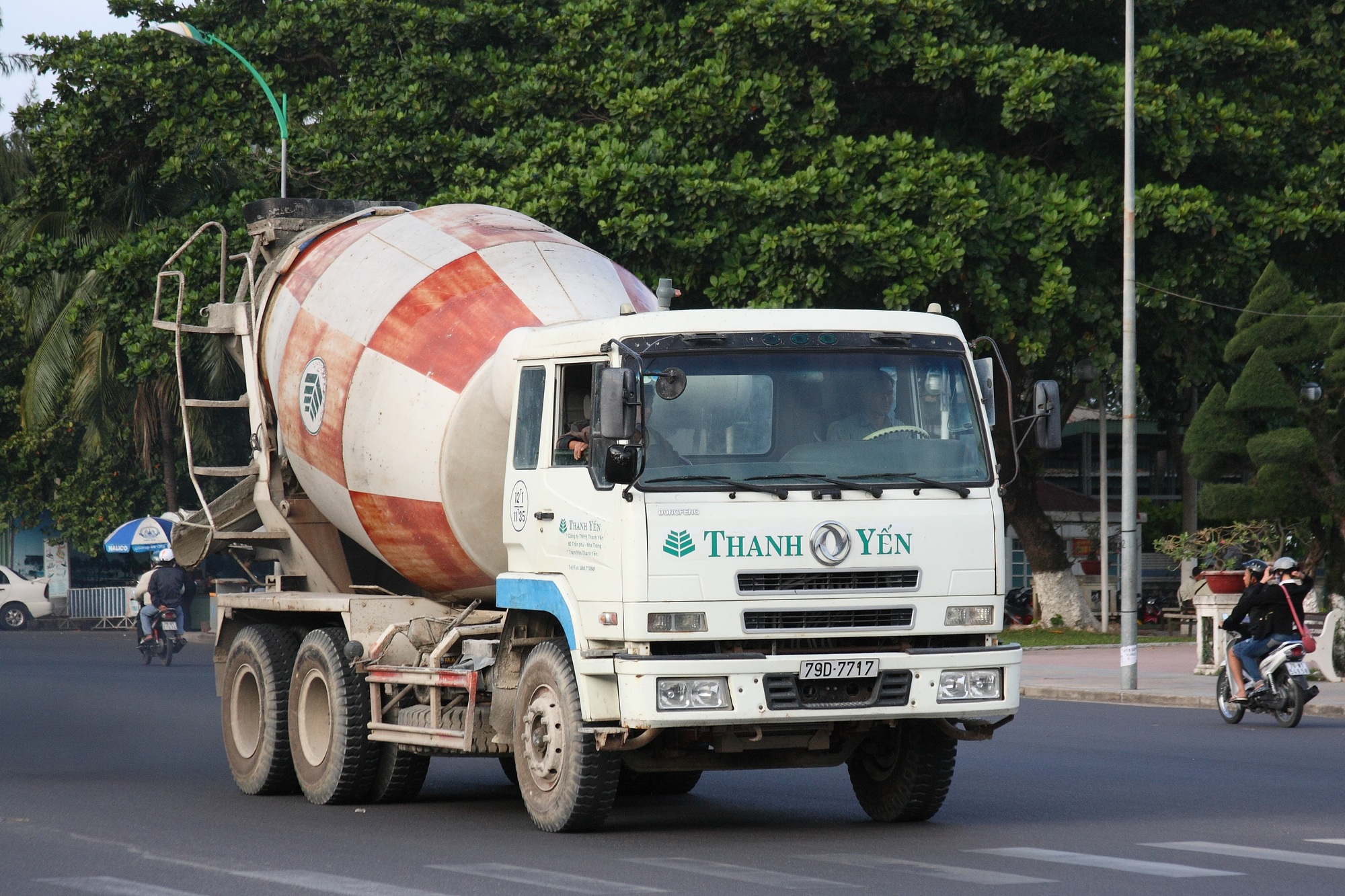
Dongfeng derivative, with a redesigned front mask

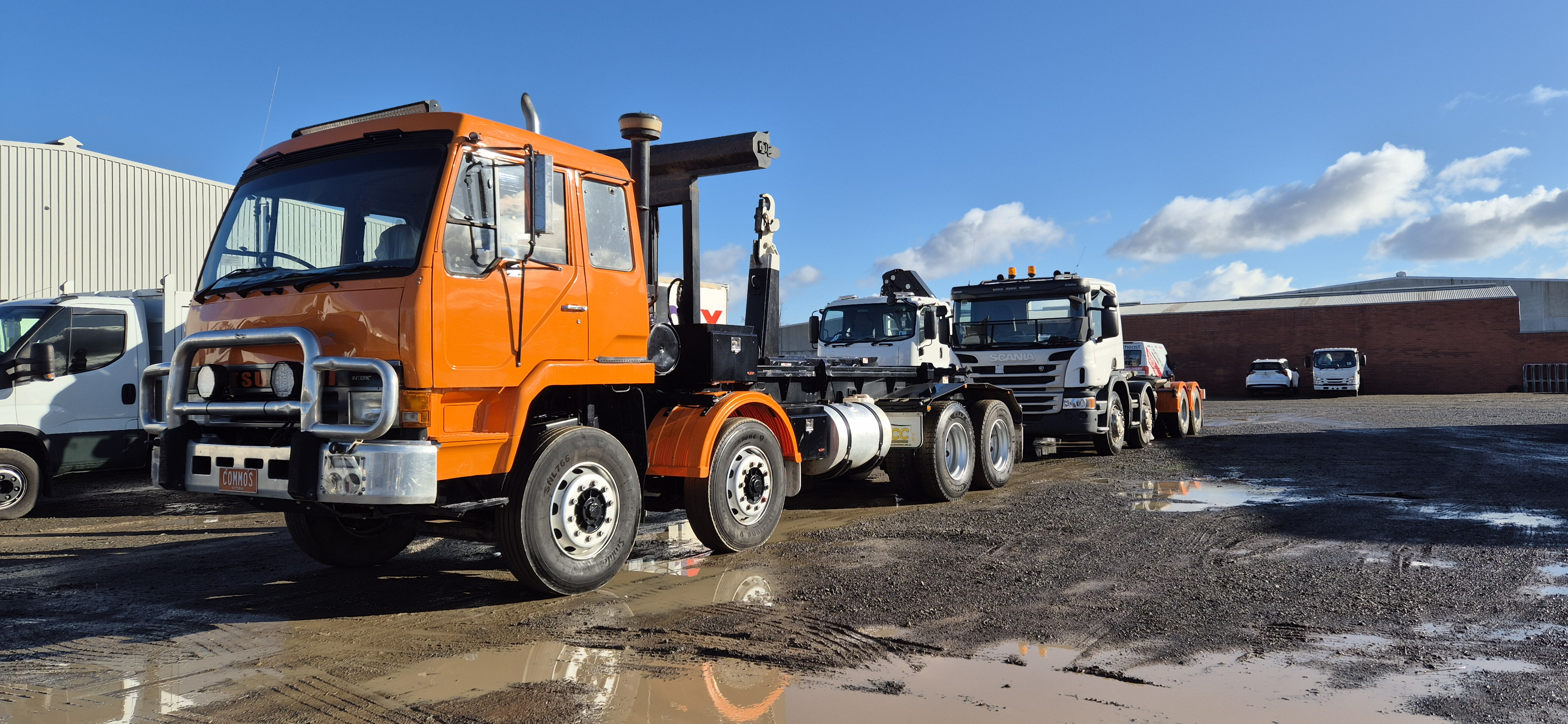
1991 Mitsubishi FS428 Hooklift seen in Australia.

== Model Codes ==
These model codes are followed by a three-digit code - this includes a leading digit "4" since The Great is the fourth iteration of the Fuso F-series trucks . The last two numbers indicate the engine; additional letter codes for more specific differences come at the end (see engine table below).

FP (1 front axle, 1 rear axle, 4x2)
FP-R (1 front axle, 1 rear axle, 4x2) semi-tractor model numbers end with an R. For example, KC-FP419DR.
FS (2 front axles, 2 rear axles, 8x4)
FT (2 front axles, 1 rear axle, 6x2)
FU (1 front axle, 2 rear axles, 6x2)
FV (2-differential version of FU) – includes tractors
FV-R (1 front axle, 2 rear axles, 6x4) semi-tractor model numbers end with an R. For example, P-FV415HR.
FN (low-floor version of FV)
FR (4×4 for snowplows)
FW (6×6 for snowplows)
FX (8×8 for snowplows)

== Engines ==
The only difference visible from the outside is the air intake snorkel, which differs between some models. There are three different snorkel placements: naturally aspirated or turbocharged V8 and 6D40 engines have a left snorkel, twin turbos have snorkels on both sides, and 6D22 and 6D24 engines have the snorkel on the right.

Model code	Engine code	Layout	Displacement		Maximum power		Years produced
Model code	Engine code	Layout	cc	cuin	PS	kW	Years produced
410	6D40(T1)	Turbo+IC; I6	12,023	733.7	350	257	1989-1996
410	6D40(T2)	Turbo+IC; I6	12,023	733.7	330	243	1989-1996
410	6D40(T3)	Turbo+IC; I6	12,023	733.7	390	287	1989-1996
411	8M20-2	V8 (NA)	20,089	1,225.9	375	276	1992-2001
411	8M20-3	V8 (NA)	20,089	1,225.9	385	283	1992-2001
411	8M20-1	V8 (NA)	20,089	1,225.9	400	294	1992-2001
412	8M21	V8 (NA)	21,205	1,294.0	420	309	1995-1996
413	8DC8	V8 (NA)	14,886	908.4	275	202	1992-1996
413	8DC8	V8 (NA)	14,886	908.4	290	213	1992-1996
414	10DC11	V10 (NA)	22,171	1,353.0	440	324	1989.5-1996
415	8DC9	V8 (NA)	16,031	978.3	300	221	1983-1996
415	8DC9	V8 (NA)	16,031	978.3	320	235	1983-1996
415	8DC9T	Turbo; V8	16,031	978.3	380	279	1983-1996
415	8DC9(T7)	Twin turbo V8	16,031	978.3	390	287	1983-1996
415	8DC9(T2)	Twin turbo V8	16,031	978.3	430	316	1983-1996
415	8DC9(T2)	Twin turbo V8	16,031	978.3	440	324	1983-1996
416	8DC10	V8	16,752	1,022.3	335	246	1983-1996
417	6D24(T1)	Turbo+IC; I6	11,945	728.9	300	221	1995-1996
417	6D24(0AT2)	Turbo+IC; I6	11,945	728.9	330	243	1995-1996
418	6D22	Turbo+IC; I6	11,149	680.4	225	165	1983-1996
418	6D22(T0)	Turbo+IC; I6	11,149	680.4	270	199	1983-1996
418	6D22(T1)	Turbo+IC; I6	11,149	680.4	285	210	1983-1996
418	6D22(T2/T7)	Turbo+IC; I6	11,149	680.4	310	228	1983-1996
418	6D22(T3)	Turbo+IC; I6	11,149	680.4	330	243	1983-1996
418	6D22(T6)	Turbo+IC; I6	11,149	680.4	280	206	1983-1996
419	8DC11	V8	17,737	1,082.4	355	261	1986.7-1996
424	10M20	V10	25,112	1,532.4	480	353	1995-1996
