= Mitsubishi Fuso Super Great =

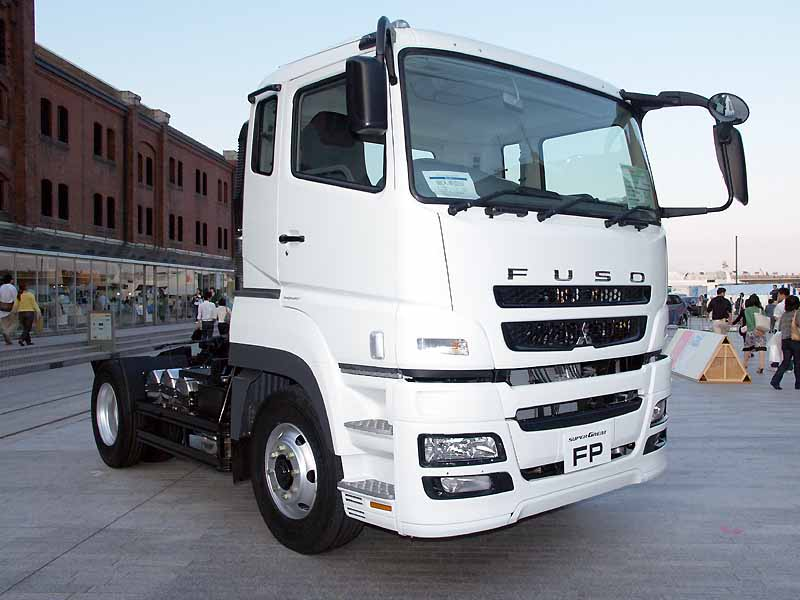
- 2007 Mitsubishi Fuso Super Great FP

Overview
- Manufacturer: Mitsubishi Motors Corporation (1996–2002); Mitsubishi Fuso Truck and Bus Corporation (2003–present)
- Also called: Mitsubishi Fuso Shogun; CAMC Classic (China)
- Production: 1996–present
- Assembly: Japan, Philippines, Dominican Republic, Singapore, Hong Kong, Taiwan, China, Australia, New Zealand, Malaysia

Body and chassis
- Class: Heavy duty truck
- Body style: Truck (standard cab (Worldwide), crew cab (Australia only))
- Related: UD Quon

Powertrain
- Engine: 8DC9, 8DC11, 8M20, 8M21, 8M22 V8, 10M20, 10M21 V10, 6D24, 6D40, 6M70, 6R10, 6R20, 6R30, 6S10, OM457, OM470 I6
- Transmission: 7-speed manual 16-speed manual 6-speed automatic INOMAT 6-speed automatic INOMAT 9-speed automatic INOMAT-II 12-speed automatic INOMAT 16-speed automatic SHIFTPILOT 12-speed automatic (since 2017)

Chronology
- Predecessor: Mitsubishi Fuso The Great

The Mitsubishi Fuso Super Great (Japanese: 三菱ふそう・スーパーグレート) is a heavy-duty commercial vehicle produced by Mitsubishi Fuso, a former division of Mitsubishi Motors (later acquired by Daimler AG). The line was launched in June 1996 to succeed the Mitsubishi Fuso The Great.

== History ==
The Super Great had driver's airbag and wheel parking brake equipped in 2000. The Super Great's cab was heavily facelifted, and the UD Trucks based AdBlue Urea Selective catalytic reduction system was equipped in 2007 on the facelift version, also used in the Nissan Diesel Quon.

In April 2017, the second generation of the Super Great appeared. The new generation retained the doors, some cabin panels, and some of the interior from the first generation. Standard equipment in the new Super Great include a new LED projector headlamps, a new 4-spoke steering wheel (replacing the original facelift version), an integrated new instrument cluster, an improved 12-speed automated manual transmission (now branded as SHIFTPILOT) and a multi-function key with push start/stop button. Sales commence of this new model in Japan started later in 2017. Safety features including Active Brake Assist, Active Attention Assistant that monitors driver alertness and provides a warning when a low attention level or distraction is detected, Lane Departure Warning System and Proximity Control Assist (side guard assist). The Super Great was the first commercial vehicle in Japan to be fitted with such advanced driving assistanc systems.

In 2023, the Mitsubishi Fuso Super Great received a facelift for the 2024 model year. The major changes are new headlights, engine, design, and the interior as well. The new engine is a 12.8-liter 6R30 turbocharged intercooled diesel engine with 394-421 PS and 2,000-2,100 Nm. The new 6R30 engine also complies with the JH25 mode heavy-duty fuel efficiency standards. The new Mitsubishi Fuso Super Great also receives these upgraded safety systems like Active Brake Assist 6, Active Sideguard Assist 2, and Front Blindspot Information System. These new models are only available with the rigid chassis type, and have 2 grades such as FS and FU, and 2 body types such as the wing box and the dump truck

== Models ==
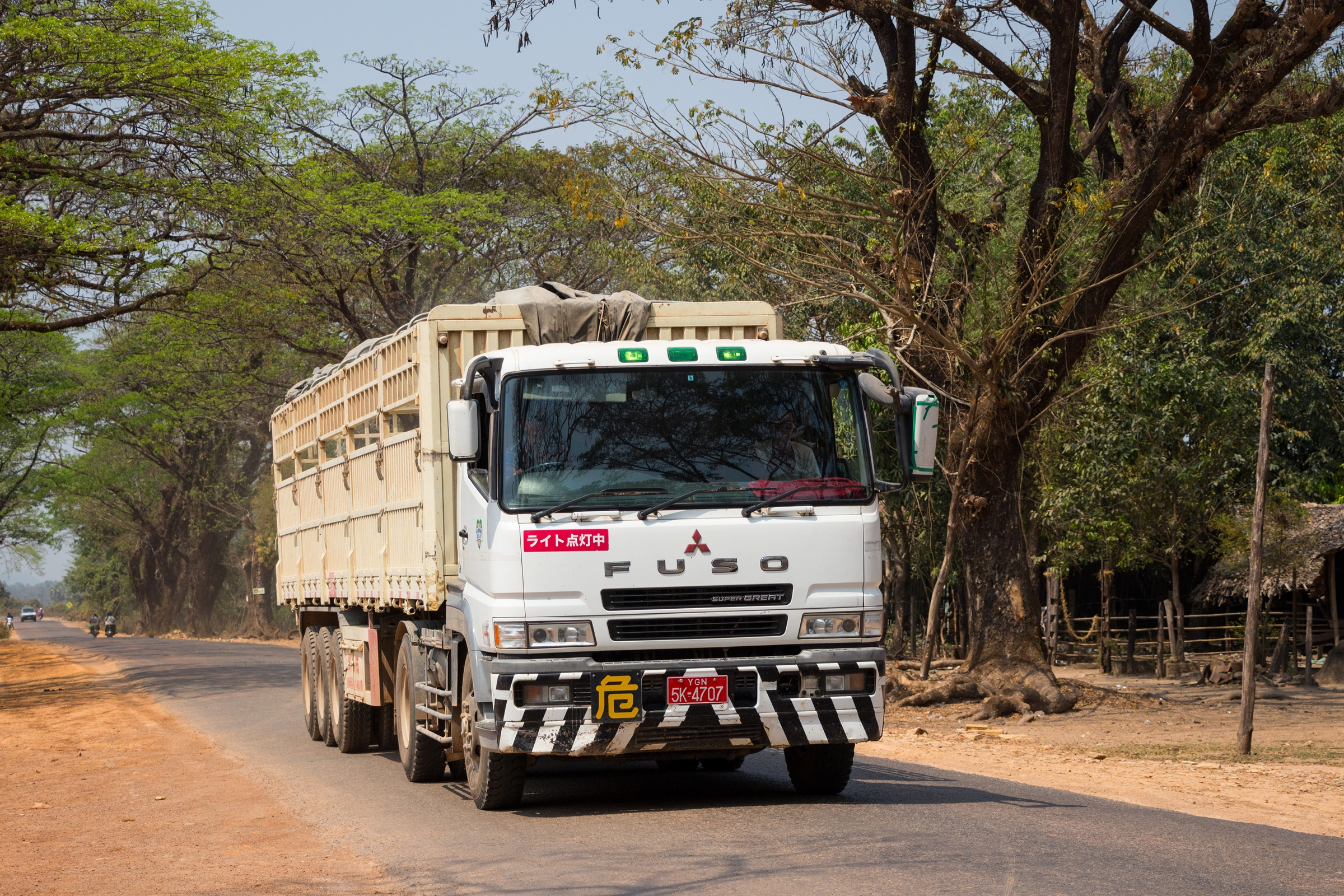
Fuso Super Great FP stake trailer truck in the rural areas of Myanmar (Burma)

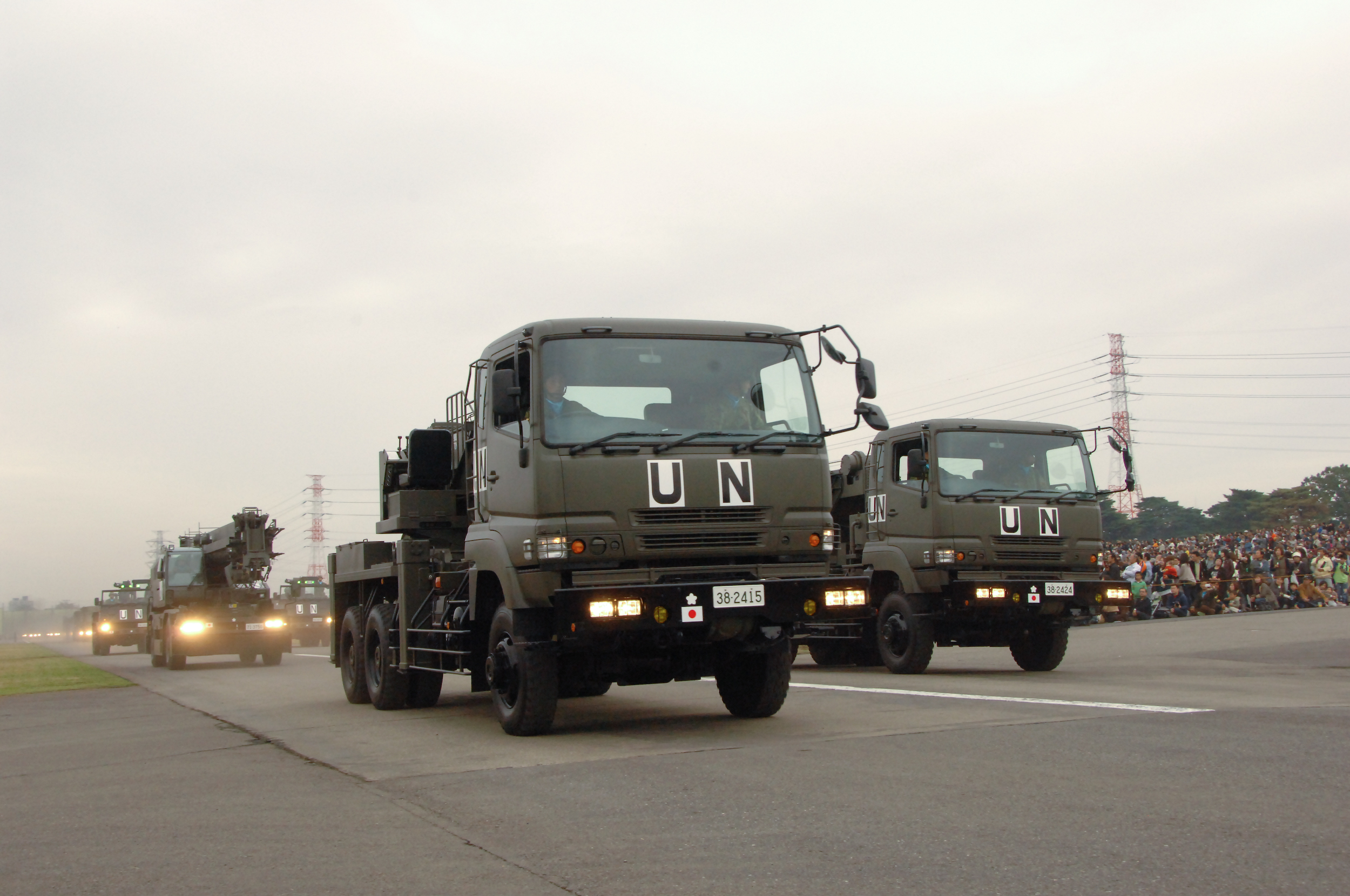
An all-terrain Fuso super great 6x6 wrecker in Japan Ground Self Defense Force part of the United nations (UN).

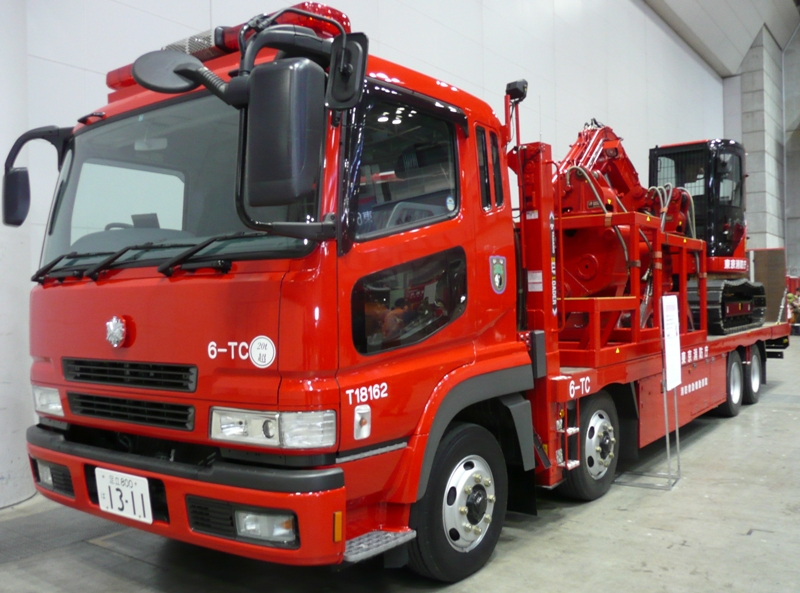
Super Great FS rescue flatbed truck with Excavator

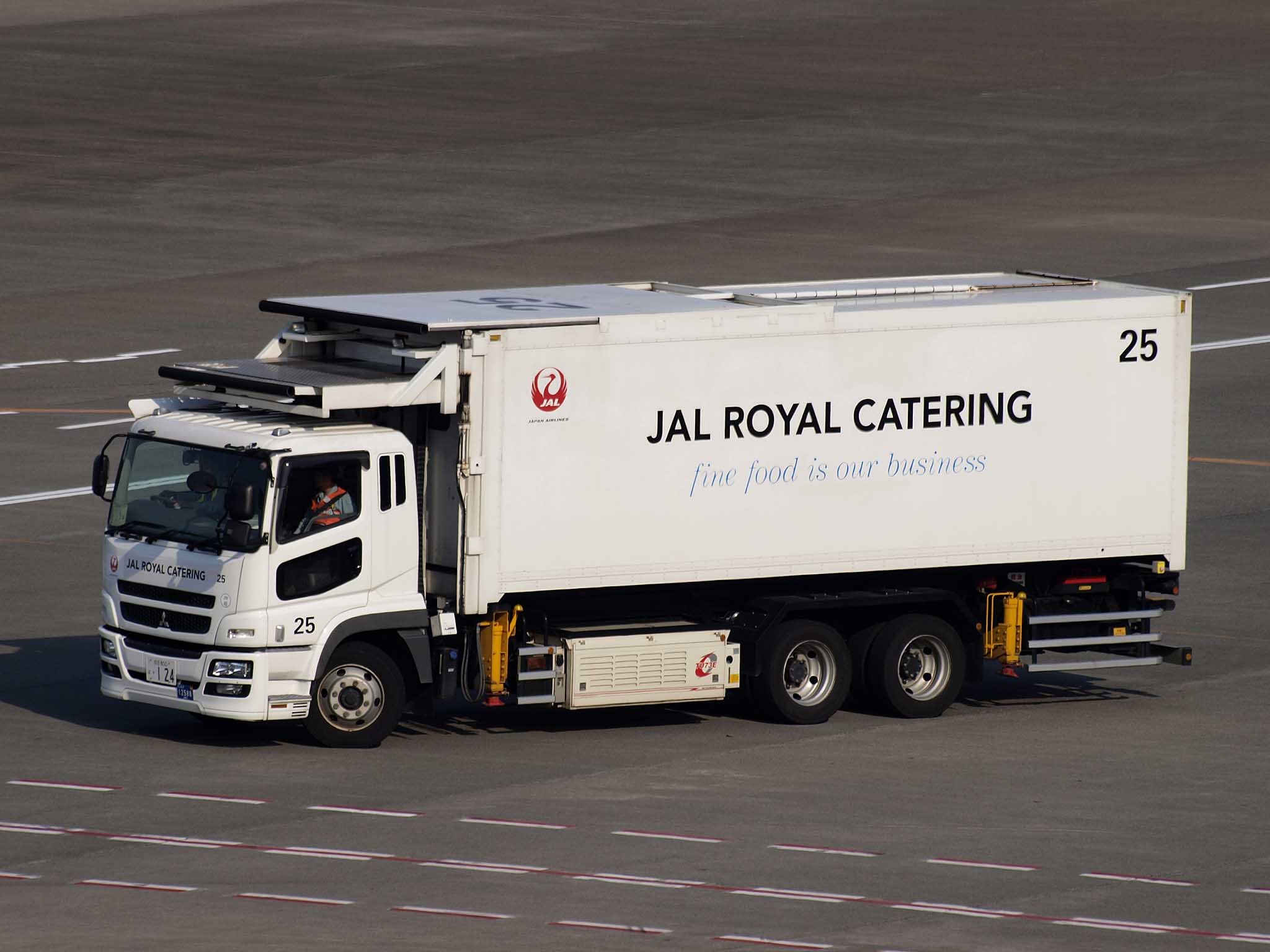
Super Great FY Catering truck #25 of JAL (Japan Airlines)

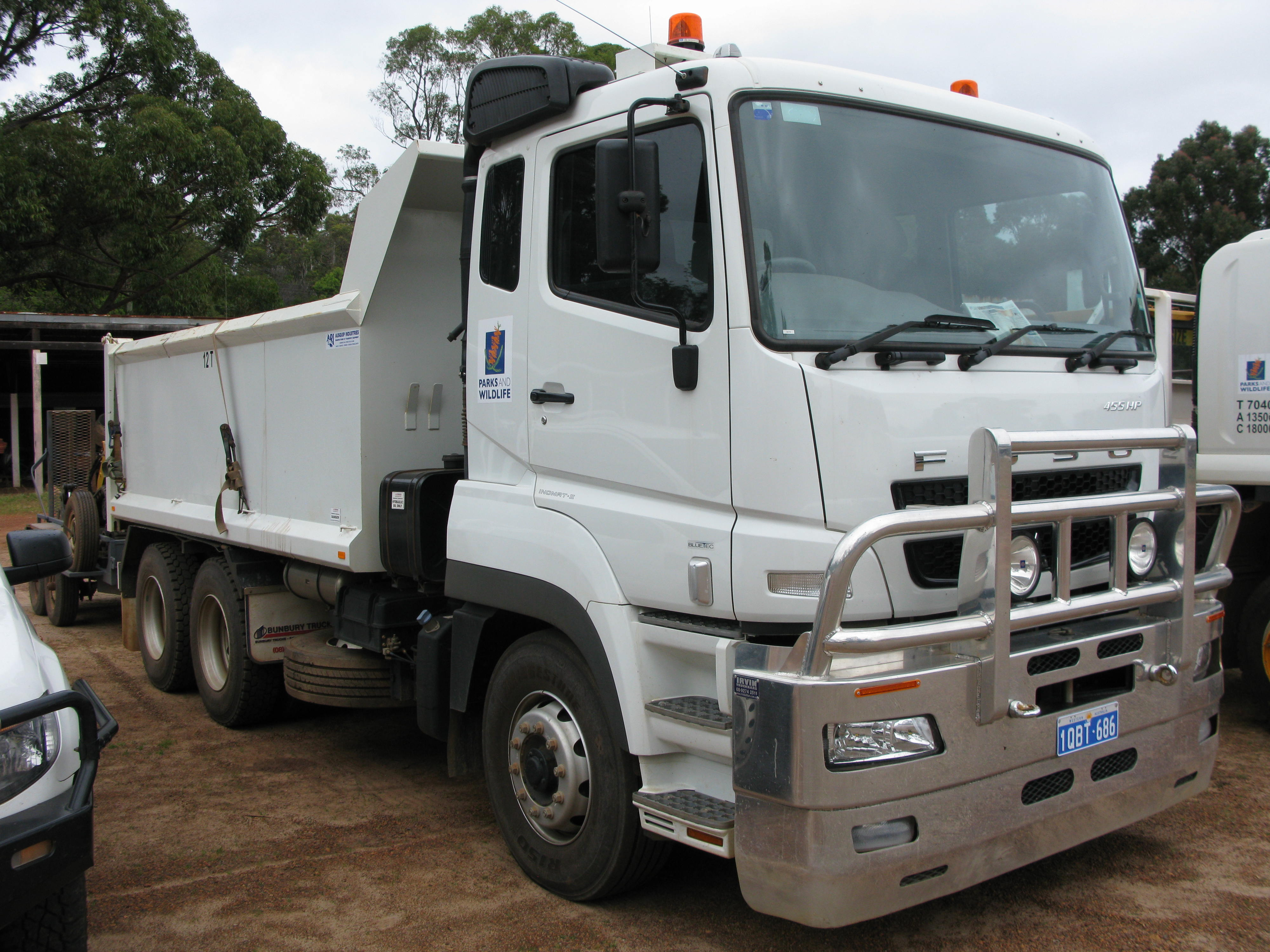
455HP Tipper Truck

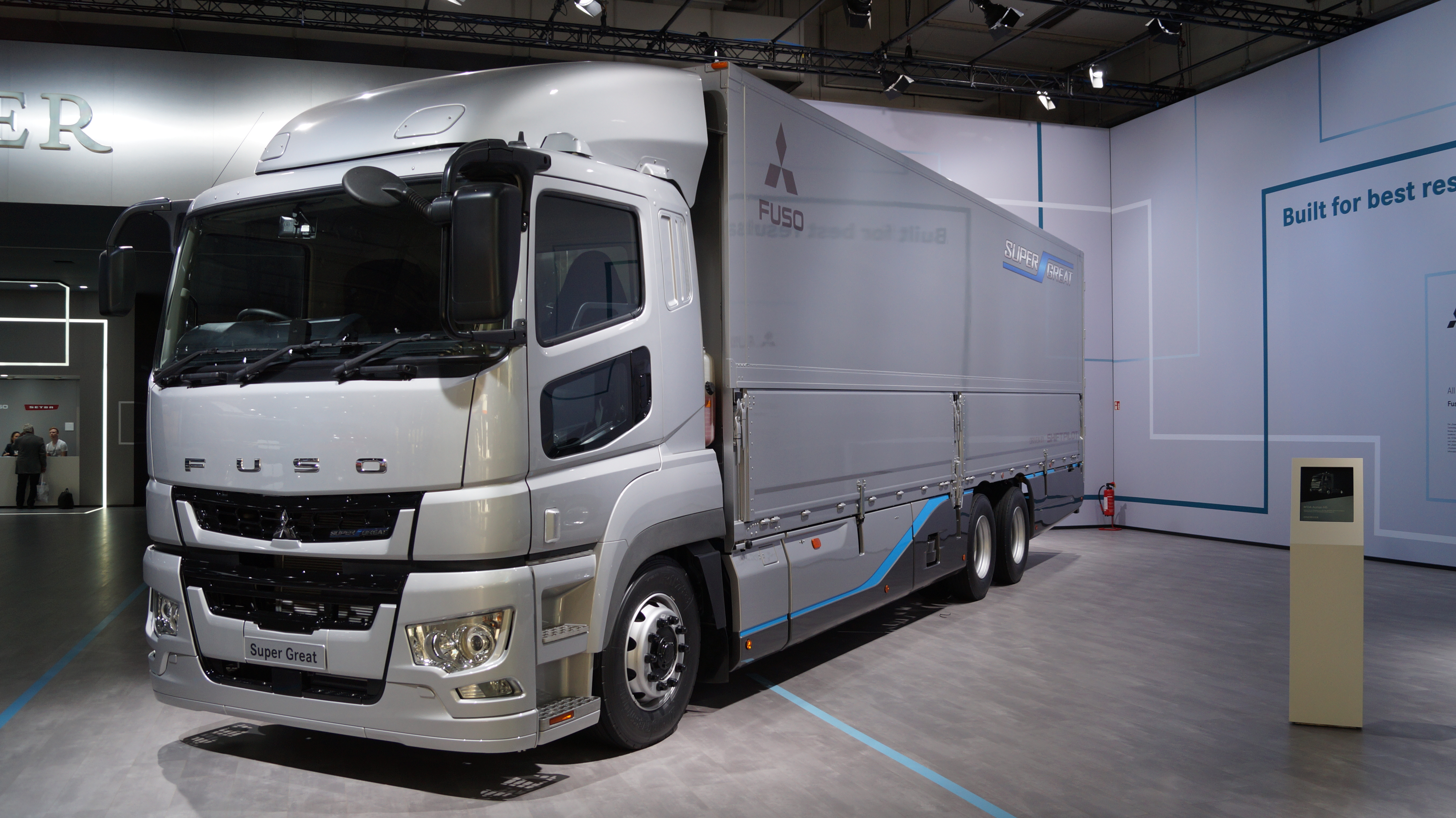
2018 FUSO Super Great FU cargo truck 6x2 (now with ShiftPilot)

=== Asia-Pacific, Mid-East, Africa, South America ===
- FP (4x2)
- FT (6x2 front twin-steer axle)
- FR (4x4)
- FU (6x2 rear tag axle)
- FV (6x4)
- FS (8x4)
- FY (6x4 low-floor)
- FW (6x6)
- FX (8x8) - JGSDF only
- FP-R (4x2 tractor)
- FV-R (6x4 tractor)
- FV-T (6x6 tractor) - JGSDF only

=== Australia ===
Sold as Heavy

- Prime Movers
  - FP54 AMT 4x2
  - FV54 AMT 6x4 (standard and high roof available)
- FV
  - AMT 6x4 MWB (air and mechanical suspension available)
  - AMT 6x4 XLWB (air suspension)
- FS
  - AMT 8x4 LWB
  - Auto 8x4 LWB

== Engines ==
Engine model	Power	Torque	Displacement	Cylinders	Bore × Stroke	Aspiration	Usage
6D24-T1	300 PS / 2,200 rpm	1,177 Nm / 1,400 rpm	11,946 cc	I6	130 × 150 mm	Turbocharged + Intercooler	1996/6–2000
6D24-T2	350 PS / 2,200 rpm	1,422 Nm / 1,400 rpm	11,946 cc	I6	130 × 150 mm	Turbocharged + Intercooler	1996/6–2000
6D40-T1	360 PS / 2,200 rpm	1,470 Nm / 1,200 rpm	12,023 cc	I6	135 × 140 mm	Turbocharged + Intercooler	1996–2001
6D40-T2	390 PS / 2,200 rpm	1,765 Nm / 1,200 rpm	12,024 cc	I6	135 × 140 mm	Turbocharged + Intercooler	1996–2001
6M70-T1	320 PS / 2,000 rpm	1,275 Nm / 1,100 rpm	12,882 cc	I6	135 × 150 mm	Turbocharged + Intercooler	2001-2010
6M70-T2	350 PS / 2,000 rpm	1,810 Nm / 1,100 rpm	12,882 cc	I6	135 × 150 mm	Turbocharged + Intercooler	2001-2010
6M70-T3	380 PS / 2,000 rpm	1,810 Nm / 1,100 rpm	12,882 cc	I6	135 × 150 mm	Turbocharged + Intercooler	2001-2010
6M70-T4	420 PS / 2,000 rpm	2,160 Nm / 1,100 rpm	12,882 cc	I6	135 × 150 mm	Turbocharged + Intercooler	2001-2010
6M70-T5	460 PS / 2,000 rpm	2,160 Nm / 1,100 rpm	12,882 cc	I6	135 × 150 mm	Turbocharged + Intercooler	2001-2010
6M70-T7	520 PS / 2,000 rpm	2,160 Nm / 1,100 rpm	12,882 cc	I6	135 × 150 mm	Turbocharged + Intercooler	2001-2010
6R10-T2	350 PS / 1,800 rpm	1,810 Nm / 1,200 rpm	12,809 cc	I6	132 × 156 mm	Turbocharged + Intercooler	2010/04–2017
6R10-T3	380 PS / 1,800 rpm	2,160 Nm / 1,100 rpm	12,809 cc	I6	132 × 156 mm	Turbocharged + Intercooler	2010/04–2017
6R10-T4	420 PS / 1,800 rpm	2,160 Nm / 1,100 rpm	12,809 cc	I6	132 × 156 mm	Turbocharged + Intercooler	2010/04–2017
6R10-T5	460 PS / 1,800 rpm	2,160 Nm / 1,100 rpm	12,809 cc	I6	132 × 156 mm	Turbocharged + Intercooler	2010/04–2017
6R20-T1	360 PS / 1,600 rpm	2,000 Nm / 1,100 rpm	10,676 cc	I6	125 × 145 mm	Turbocharged + Intercooler	2017–present
6R20-T2	394 PS / 1,600 rpm	2,000 Nm / 1,100 rpm	10,676 cc	I6	125 × 145 mm	Turbocharged + Intercooler	2017–present
6R20-T3	428 PS / 1,600 rpm	2,100 Nm / 1,100 rpm	10,676 cc	I6	125 × 145 mm	Turbocharged + Intercooler	2017–present
6R20-T4	460 PS / 1,600 rpm	2,200 Nm / 1,100 rpm	10,676 cc	I6	125 × 145mm	Turbocharged + Intercooler	2017–present
6S10-T1	354 PS / 2,200 rpm	1,400 Nm / 1,200–1,600 rpm	7,697 cc	I6	110 × 135 mm	Turbocharged + Intercooler	2017–present
6S10-T2	381 PS / 2,200 rpm	1,400 Nm / 1,200–1,600 rpm	7,697 cc	I6	110 × 135 mm	Turbocharged + Intercooler	2017–present
8DC9	320 PS / 2,200 rpm	1,079 Nm / 1,400 rpm	16,032 cc	V8	135 × 140 mm	Naturally Aspirated	1996/06–2005/10*
8DC9-T2	440 PS / 2,200 rpm	1,571 Nm / 1,300 rpm	16,032 cc	V8	135 × 140 mm	Twin Turbocharged + Intercooler	1996/06–2005/10*
8DC11-1	330 PS / 2,100 rpm	1,179 Nm / 1,300 rpm	17,737 cc	V8	142 × 140 mm	Naturally Aspirated	1996/06–2005/10*
8DC11-2	355 PS / 2,200 rpm	1,225 Nm / 1,300 rpm	17,737 cc	V8	142 × 140 mm	Naturally Aspirated	1996/06–2005/10*
8DC11-3	365 PS / 2,200 rpm	1,274 Nm / 1,300 rpm	17,737 cc	V8	142 × 140 mm	Naturally Aspirated	1996/06–2005/10*
8M20-1	400 PS / 2,200 rpm	1,470 Nm / 1,300 rpm	20,090 cc	V8	146 × 150 mm	Naturally Aspirated	1996/06–2005/10*
8M20-2	375 PS / 2,200 rpm	1,323 Nm / 1,300 rpm	20,090 cc	V8	146 × 150 mm	Naturally Aspirated	1996/06–2005/10*
8M20-3	385 PS / 2,200 rpm	1,353 Nm / 1,300 rpm	20,090 cc	V8	146 × 150 mm	Naturally Aspirated	1996/06–2005/10*
8M21-1	370 PS / 2,200 rpm	1,274 Nm / 1,200 rpm	21,206 cc	V8	150 × 150 mm	Naturally Aspirated	1996/06–2005/10*
8M21-2	400 PS / 2,200 rpm	1,392 Nm / 1,200 rpm	21,206 cc	V8	150 × 150 mm	Naturally Aspirated	1996/06–2005/10*
8M21-3	420 PS / 2,200 rpm	1,470 Nm / 1,300 rpm	21,206 cc	V8	150 × 150 mm	Naturally Aspirated	1996/06–2005/10*
8M21-4	430 PS / 2,200 rpm	1,519 Nm / 1,200 rpm	21,206 cc	V8	150 × 150 mm	Naturally Aspirated	1996/06–2005/10*
8M22-T1	550 PS / 2,000 rpm	2,160 Nm / 1,100 rpm	19,004 cc	V8	142 × 150 mm	Twin Turbocharged + Intercooler	1996/06–2005/10*
8M22-T2	480 PS / 2,000 rpm	1,770 Nm / 1,100 rpm	19,004 cc	V8	142 × 150 mm	Twin Turbocharged + Intercooler	1996/06–2005/10*
10M20	480 PS / 2,200 rpm	1,735 Nm / 1,300 rpm	25,112 cc	V-10	146 × 150 mm	Naturally Aspirated	1996/06–2005/10*
10M21	520 PS / 2,200 rpm	1,810 Nm / 1,200 rpm	26,507 cc	V-10	150 × 150 mm	Naturally Aspirated	1996/06–2005/10*
OM457	401 PS / 1,900 rpm	2,000 Nm / 1,100 rpm	11,967 cc	I6	128 × 125 mm	Turbocharged + Intercooler	
OM470	394 PS / 1,600 rpm	2,000 Nm / 1,100 rpm	10,677 cc	I6	125 × 145 mm	Turbocharged + Intercooler	
*V engines phased out October 2005 or earlier at least for JDM

=== New Zealand ===
Fuso Shogun (truck model in New Zealand only)

- Shogun 4x2 350
- Shogun 6x4 350/430/HT 470/HT 530
- Shogun 8x4 430

== See also ==
- Mitsubishi Fuso Truck & Bus Corporation
