= EPower Engine Systems =

Hybrid train development company

ePower Engine Systems, llc. is a developer of hybrid electric drive train technology for Class 8 trucks. It was issued US Patent 8,783,396 on July 22, 2014, encompassing their drive train technology. ePower is in the final stages of its Research and Development of a diesel electric kit for rebuilding older Class 8 trucks. The kit consists of a road-certified diesel engine, batteries, electric motor and an automatic transmission from major manufacturers.

== Technique ==
ePower Engine Systems' technique is to have a diesel generator drive an electric motor and utilize an automatic transmission to drive the wheels of large Class 8 trucks (called semi trucks in the USA). Batteries are used to store additional power needed to climb grades and recharged either by the genset or regenerative braking. The diesel engine being used is about 1/2 the size of a normal engine found in one of these trucks. Therefore, the diesel consumption is about thirty to forty percent less than a normal truck. The company is currently experimenting with an Eaton 10-speed transmission and Super capacitors. The Cummins diesel engine, Marathon generator and Marathon electric motor remain as in prior versions of the kit.
