= Hybrid electric truck =

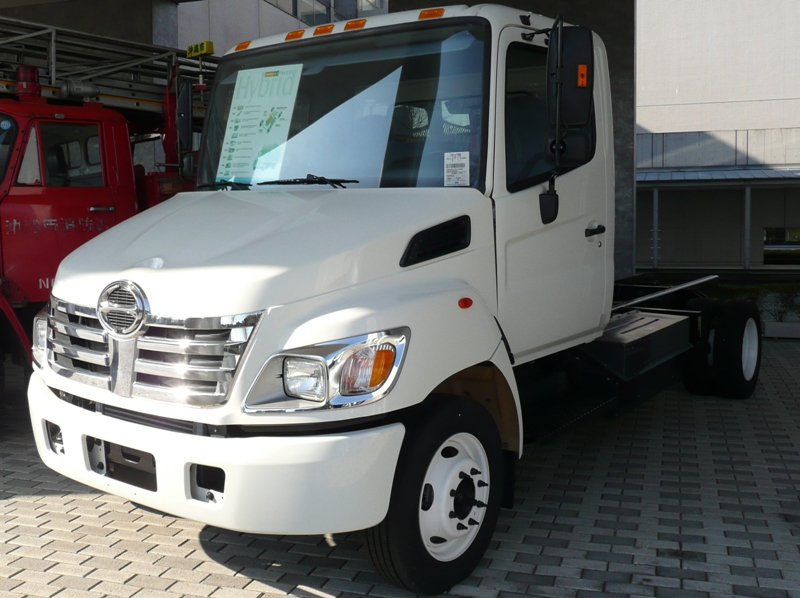
Hino hybrid diesel-electric truck.

A hybrid electric truck is a form of truck that uses hybrid electric vehicle (HEV) technology for propulsion, instead of using only a combustion engine.

According to a report from Pike Research, the global market for hybrid medium- and heavy-duty trucks and buses will increase from 9,000 vehicles sold in 2010 to more than 10 times more (more than 100,000 vehicles) in 2015. During this five-year period, the firm forecasts that a total of nearly 300,000 hybrid electric trucks will be sold worldwide.

== History ==
In 2003, GM introduced a hybrid diesel-electric military (light) truck that is equipped with a diesel electric and a fuel cell auxiliary power unit. Hybrid electric light trucks were introduced in 2004 by Mercedes-Benz (Sprinter) and Micro-Vett SPA (Daily Bimodale).

International Truck and Engine Corp. and Eaton Corp. were selected to manufacture diesel-electric hybrid trucks for a U.S. pilot program that is serving the utility industry in 2004.

== Vehicles ==
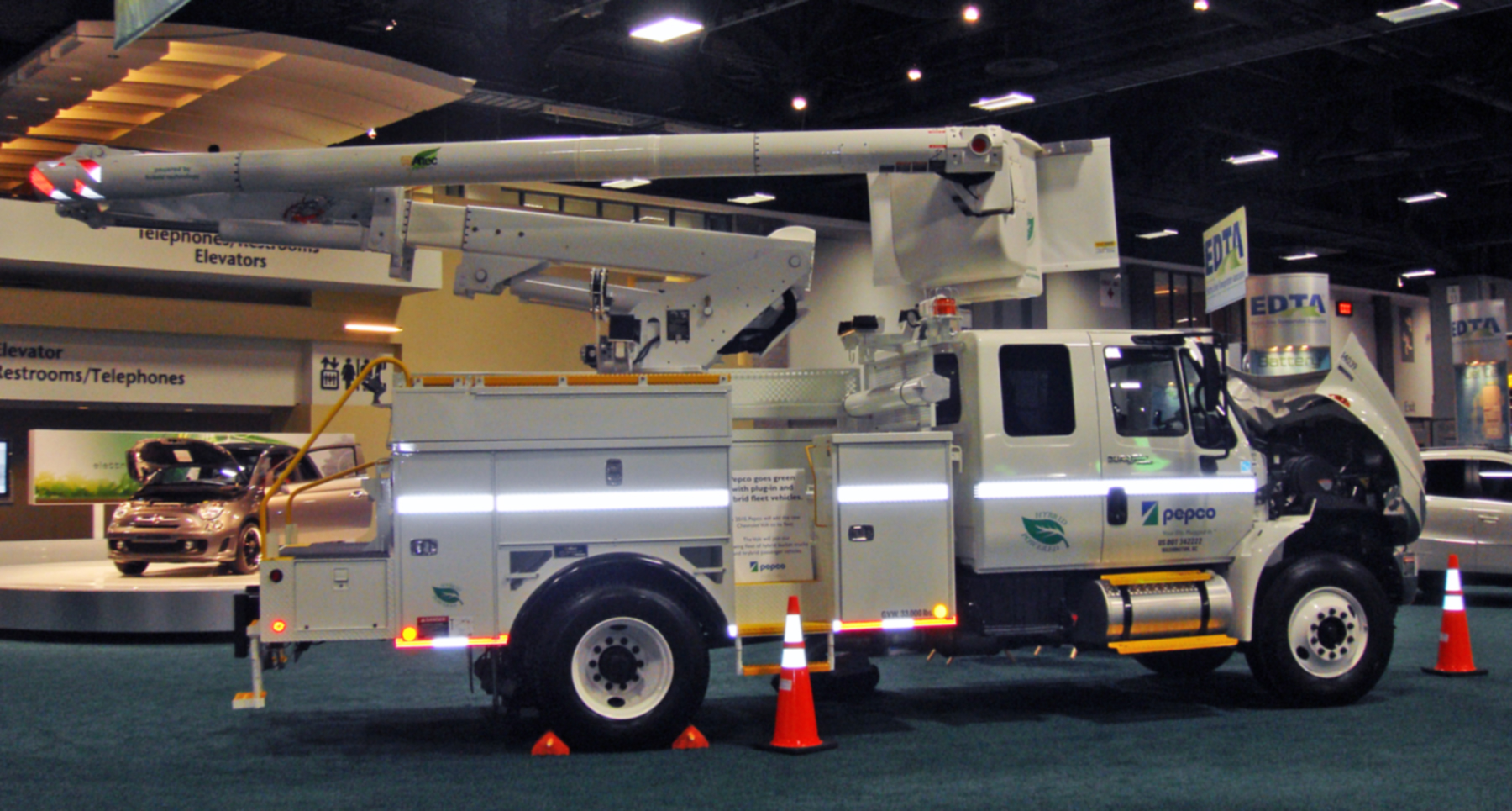
PEPCO's hybrid diesel-electric utility truck exhibited in the 2010 Washington Auto Show.

In mid-2005, Isuzu introduced the Elf Diesel Hybrid Truck to the Japanese market. They claim that approximately 300 vehicles, mostly route buses are using the Hinos HIMR (Hybrid Inverter Controlled Motor & Retarder) system. In 2006, Mitsubishi Canter Eco Hybrid was introduced at the National Work Truck Show in Atlanta, GA, and at the Mid-America Trucking Show in Louisville. In 2007, high purchase price meant a hard sell for hybrid trucks and appears the first U.S. production hybrid truck (International Durastar Hybrid). In September 2010, DAF Trucks introduced a hybrid version of the LF45 in Hannover. In January 2018 Ram Trucks introduced its fifth generation Pickup Truck at the North American International Auto Show in Detroit, Michigan. In December 2019, Nikola Corporation in a joint venture with Iveco and FPT Industrial introduced zero emission class 8 truck in US market. In 2021, Ford Motor Company introduced Hybrid Truck F-150 Lightning Ford F-Series

Other vehicles are:

- Big mining machines, for example the Liebherr T 282B dump truck or Keaton Vandersteen LeTourneau L-2350 wheel loader are powered that way. Also there was several models of BelAZ (7530 and 7560 series) in USSR (now in Belarus) since 1970.
- NASA's huge Crawler-Transporters are diesel-electric.
- Mitsubishi Fuso Canter Eco Hybrid is a diesel-electric commercial truck.
- Hino Motors (a Toyota subsidiary) has the world's first production hybrid electric truck in Australia (110 kW or 150 hp diesel engine plus a 23 kW or 31 hp electric motor).
- Azure Dynamics Balance Hybrid Electric is a gasoline-hybrid electric medium dutry truck based on the Ford E-450 chassis.
- Volvo FE Hybrid with Volvo Trucks D7F Engine with diesel and parallel hybrid. Suitable for example waste collecting trucks.

Other hybrid petroleum-electric truck makers are DAF Trucks, Hyliion, MAN AG with MAN TGL Series, Nikola Motor Company with the Nikola One, Nissan Motors and Renault Trucks with Renault Puncher.

Consumer trucks:

- Ford F-150 PowerBoost
- Ford Maverick Hybrid
- GMC Sierra 1500 Hybrid
- Chevrolet Silverado 1500 Hybrid
- Toyota Tundra i-FORCE MAX

Large battery:

- BYD T5DM - 55.39 kWh, Class 2b
- Edison Motors semi truck - 280 kWh, Class 8
- Harbinger motors/Jayco embark ev - 175 kWh, Class 5

== Powertrains ==
Hybrid electric truck technology and powertrain maker: ZF Friedrichshafen, Eaton Corporation, Azure Dynamics.

== Fleets ==
Coca-Cola Enterprises (CCE) has the largest fleet of hybrid electric trucks in North America. The hybrid electric tractors are the standard bulk delivery truck that the company uses for large deliveries. CCE plans to incrementally deploy 185 of the hybrid electric trucks across the United States and Canada in 2009, bringing their total number of hybrid electric delivery trucks to 327, the largest such fleet in North America. The company has 142 small hybrid electric delivery vehicles on the road. The trucks are powered by Eaton Corporation's hybrid electric drivetrain systems.

In 2010, the UPS fleet in Philadelphia has expanded with 50 new hybrid electric trucks.

== Legislation ==
By a voice vote, the United States House of Representatives approved the Heavy Duty Hybrid Vehicle Research, Development, and Demonstration Act of 2009 (for heavy duty plug-in hybrid vehicles) authored by representative James Sensenbrenner. The term advanced heavy duty hybrid vehicle means a vehicle with a gross weight between 14,000 pounds (6,400 kg) and 33,000 pounds (15,000 kg) that is fueled, in part, by a rechargeable electricity storage system.

== See also ==
- Cummins
- Electric bus
- Electric vehicle conversion
- Energy conservation
- Hybrid electric bus
- North American Council for Freight Efficiency
- Plug-in hybrid
- Retrofit
- Rocky Mountain Institute
- Truck classification
