= Archion =

Japanese holding company for truckmakers

Archion Corporation

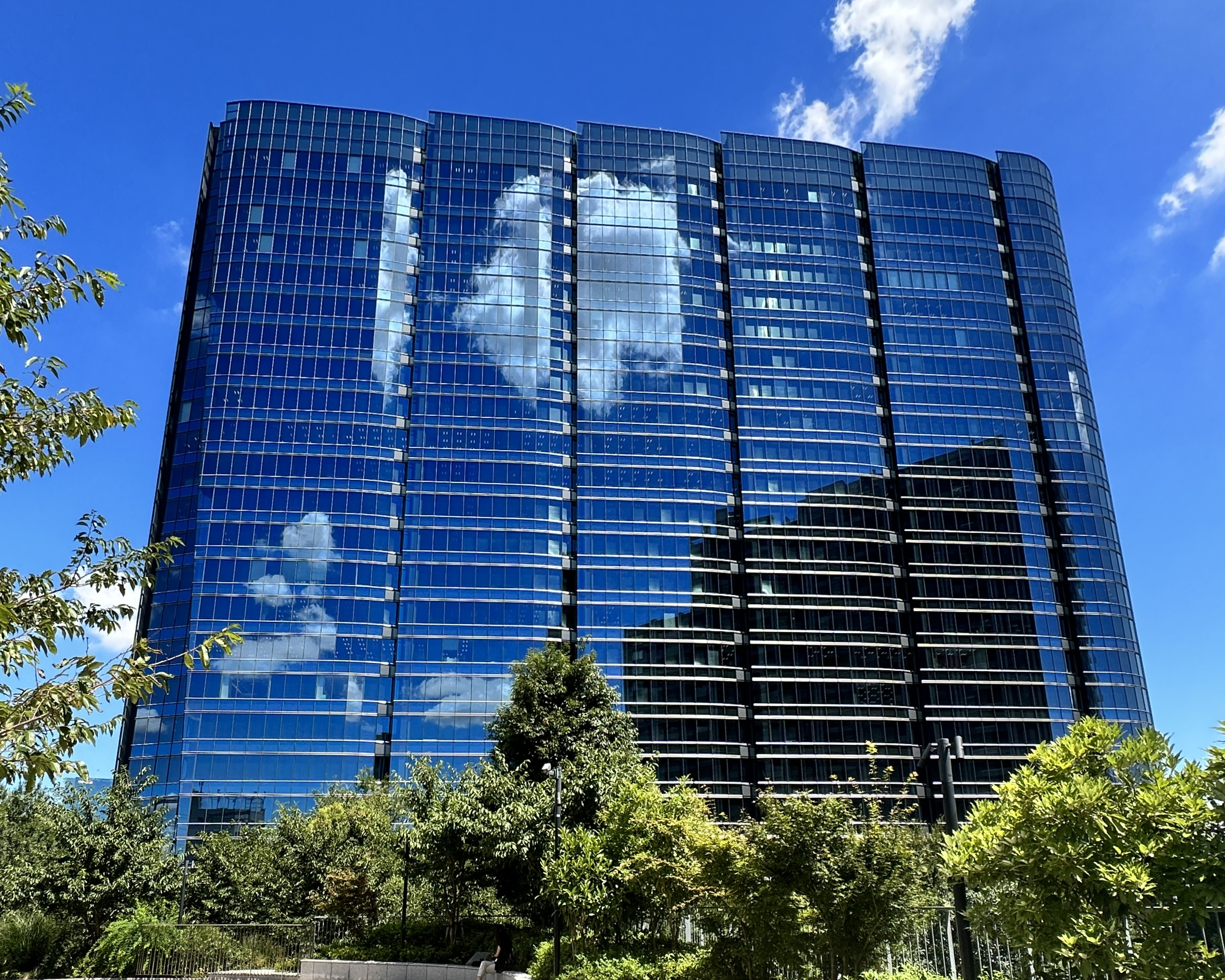
- Archion's headquarters at Osaki Garden Tower in Shinagawa, Tokyo
- Type: Public company
- Traded as: TYO: 543A
- Industry: Automotive
- Founded: 2 June 2025; 17 months ago in Shinagawa, Japan
- Headquarters: Nishi-shinagawa 1, Shinagawa, Tokyo, Japan
- Key people: Karl Deppen (Chairman, President & CEO); Satoshi Ogiso (Chief Technology Officer)
- Products: Trucks and buses
- Parent: Daimler Truck (25%); Toyota (25%)
- Subsidiaries: Fuso; Hino Motors; Rizon Trucks
- Website: archion.co.jp

Archion (Japanese: アーチオン, Hepburn: Āchion) is a Japanese holding company that was founded to assume full ownership of truck manufacturing companies Mitsubishi Fuso, Hino, and Rizon Trucks in 2026, following their 2025 merger agreement. Its headquarters are in Shinagawa, Tokyo, Japan.

Archion was established in Japan on 2 June 2025, and became operational on 1 April 2026 to align with the Japanese fiscal year. Daimler Truck and Toyota, respectively the parent companies of Fuso and Hino, each own 25% of Archion. The merger was delayed from 2024 because of concerns that Hino would be liable in the United States for fraudulently certifying its engines' air pollutant emissions. (Note: Hino ultimately pled guilty to criminal fraud, and was placed on probation and ordered to pay fines and penalties of about US$1.6 billion.) It also took longer than expected to receive regulatory approval in Japan and Southeast Asia, where both truckmakers have large market shares.

Truck production will be consolidated into three Japanese factories (at Kawasaki in Kanagawa, Koga in Ibaraki, and Ōta in Gunma). Hino's factory at Hamura, Tokyo will become a Toyota factory, and Fuso's factory at Aikawa, Kanagawa will be subsumed into the facility at Kawasaki. Initially, the Fuso, Hino, and Rizon brands and corporate operations will remain distinct, and Archion will offer truck models from both brands. Archion's executive management roles were filled by a combination of former Fuso and Hino personnel, including a Chief Executive Officer and Chief Financial Officer from Fuso, and a Chief Technology Officer from Hino.

Additionally, Archion intends to pursue the development and increased commercialization of zero-emissions vehicles (including hydrogen-powered vehicles, which are politically important in Japan and closely associated with Toyota). Presently, both Hino and Fuso have battery-electric vehicle development programs, and Hino is developing fuel-cell drivetrains.
