= Mitsubishi Fuso Aero Star =

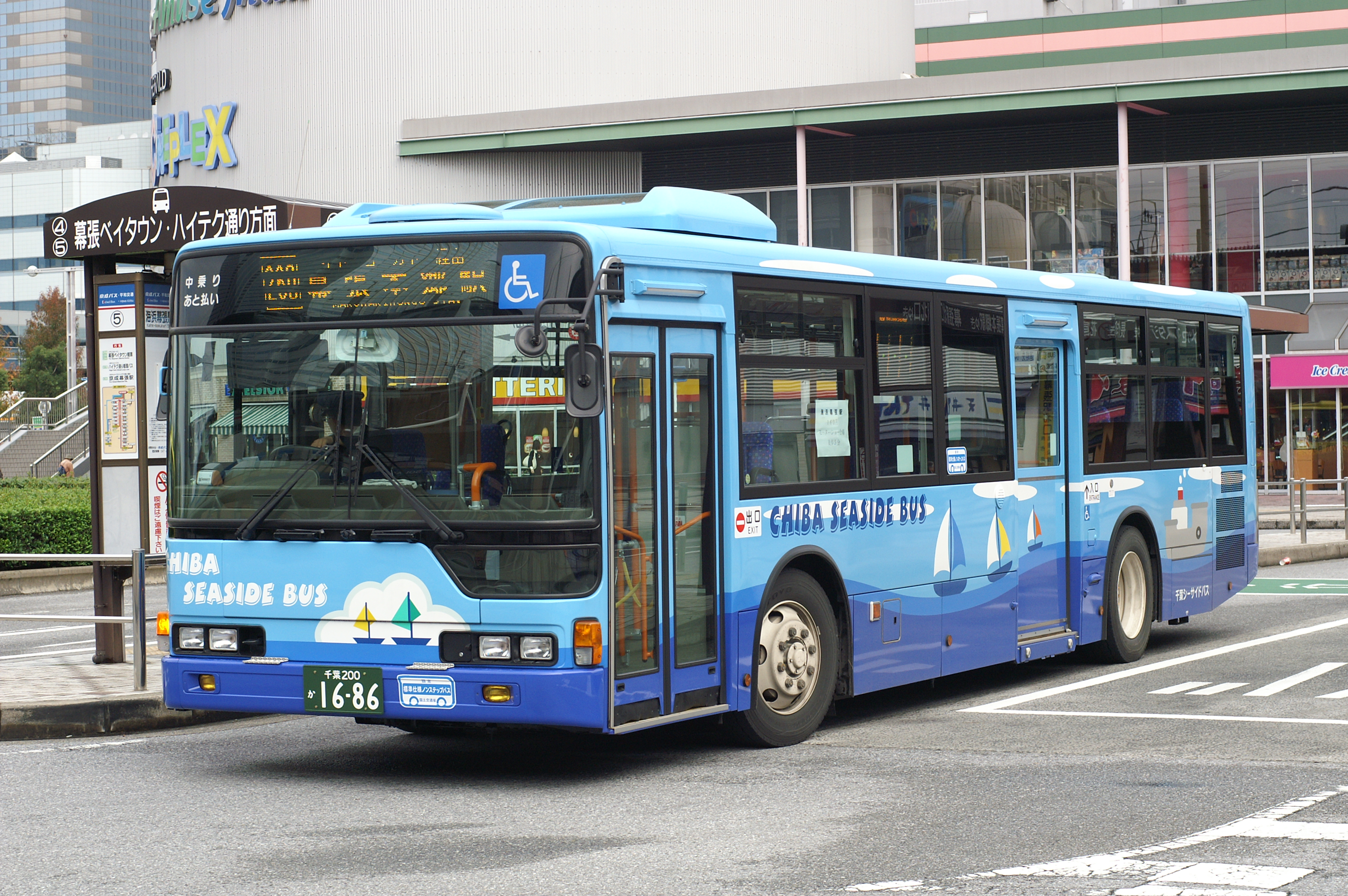

Overview
- Manufacturer: Mitsubishi Motors Corporation (1984–2002); Mitsubishi Fuso Truck and Bus Corporation (2003–present); Hyundai Motor Company
- Also called: Hyundai Aero City
- Production: 1984–present

Body and chassis
- Class: Complete bus Bus chassis
- Body style: Single-decker bus
- Doors: 1 or 2
- Floor type: Step-entrance; Low floor Low entry

Powertrain
- Engine: 6D22, 6D24, 6M70, MD92 (UD Trucks), 6M60 (Mitsubishi Fuso)
- Transmission: 5-speed manual INOMAT 6-speed automatic Allison 5-speed automatic

Dimensions
- Wheelbase: 4.8 meter, 5.3 meter
- Length: 9.4m, 10.1m and 10.5m
- Width: 2.5m
- Height: 3.0m or 3.4m

Chronology
- Predecessor: Mitsubishi Fuso MP Series

The Mitsubishi Fuso Aero Star (kana:三菱ふそう・エアロスター) is a heavy-duty single-decker bus produced by the Japanese manufacturer Mitsubishi Fuso. The range was available as either a public bus or a coach. Its principal competitors are the Isuzu Erga, the Nissan Diesel Space Runner RA and the Hino Blue Ribbon.

== Fuso full-size city bus (1950–1976) ==
- MR Series (1960–1964)
- B800 Series (Line)
  - B800, B805 (1967)
  - B820J (1969)
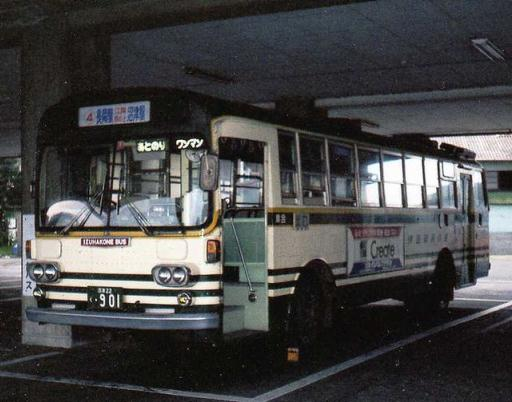
MR410

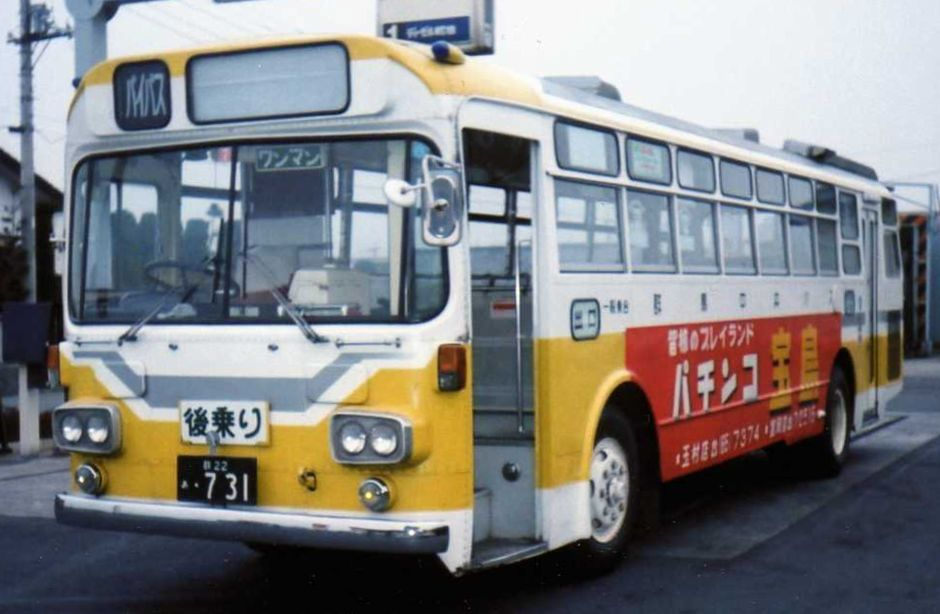
MR470

== MR Series (1950 - 1977) ==
Mitsubishi Japan Heavy Industries (at that time) was the first route car to adopt a frameless monocoque structure, and was announced in 1959. There was an MR series with leaf suspension (leaf spring) specifications and a MAR series with air suspension (air spring) specifications. In addition, the R (leaf suspension) / AR (air suspension) series continued to be available for models with frames, and (A) the R300 series and (A) R400 series were available. The initial lineup was divided into the M(A)R300 series, which had an inline 6-cylinder DB31 engine (165 PS) mounted transversely, and the M(A)R400 series, which had the same engine mounted vertically, but the year after its appearance, the production of transverse engine cars was discontinued, and it was unified into the M(A)R400 series. The models were subdivided according to the length of the body and wheelbase, and there were minor changes with each minor change, but the 10 m length M(A)R410 type and the 10.5 m length M(A)R470 won the support of many bus operators and became the best-selling model of route cars at the time.

In addition, in 1963, the MR430 was released as a long car. It was a unique vehicle for a route bus vehicle with a total length of 12 m and two front wheels, but due to the road conditions at that time, there were few situations where long cars could be fully utilized, and because it was too large, there were restrictions on the running road, so JNR Bus, Nagoya railways, Asahikawa Bus (merged with Asahikawa Electric Railway) were only 14 sales results to the three companies, 11 Fuji Heavy Industries bodies and 3 Kure bodies.

== MP Series (1976–1984) ==
- MP107/117/517 (1976)
- K-MP107/MP118/518 (1980)
- P-MP118/518 (1983)
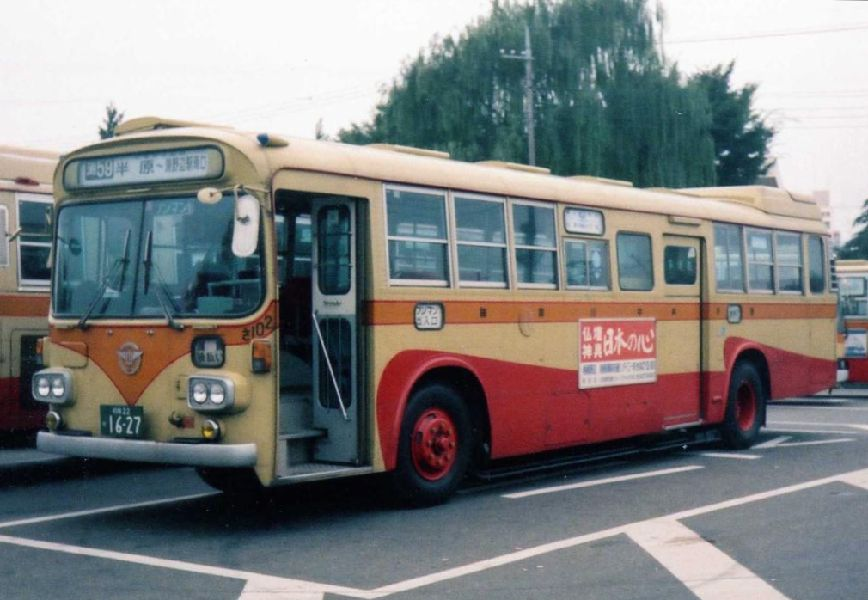
MP117N

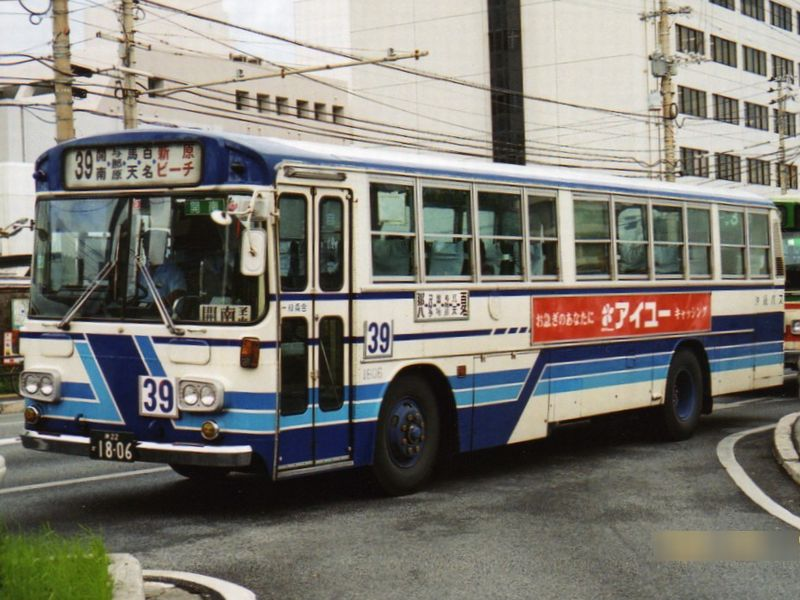
MP K-MP118M

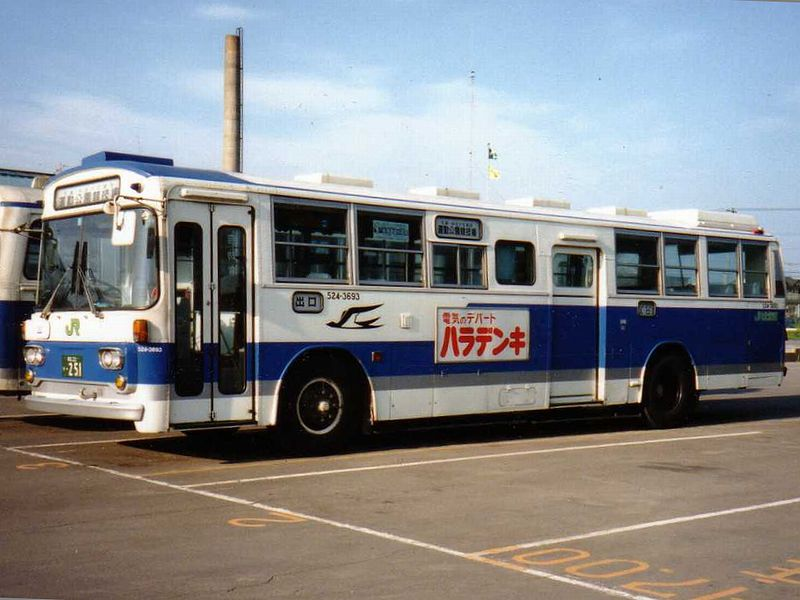
MP K-MP118N

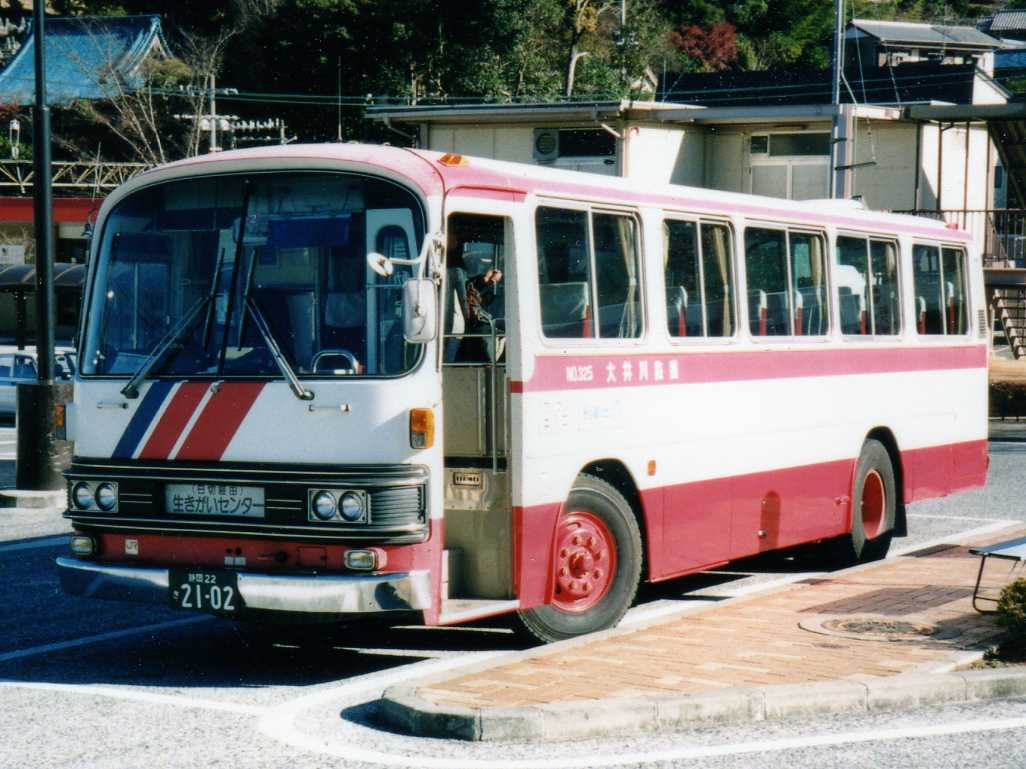
MP K-MP518K

== Aero Star (first series, 1984–1996) ==
- P-MP218/618K/M/N/P (1984)
- U-MP218/618K/M/N/P (1990)
  - U-MP618K/Mkai (MBECS Hybrid, 1993)
  - U-MP628K (1993)
- KC-MP217/617/627K/M/N/P (1995)
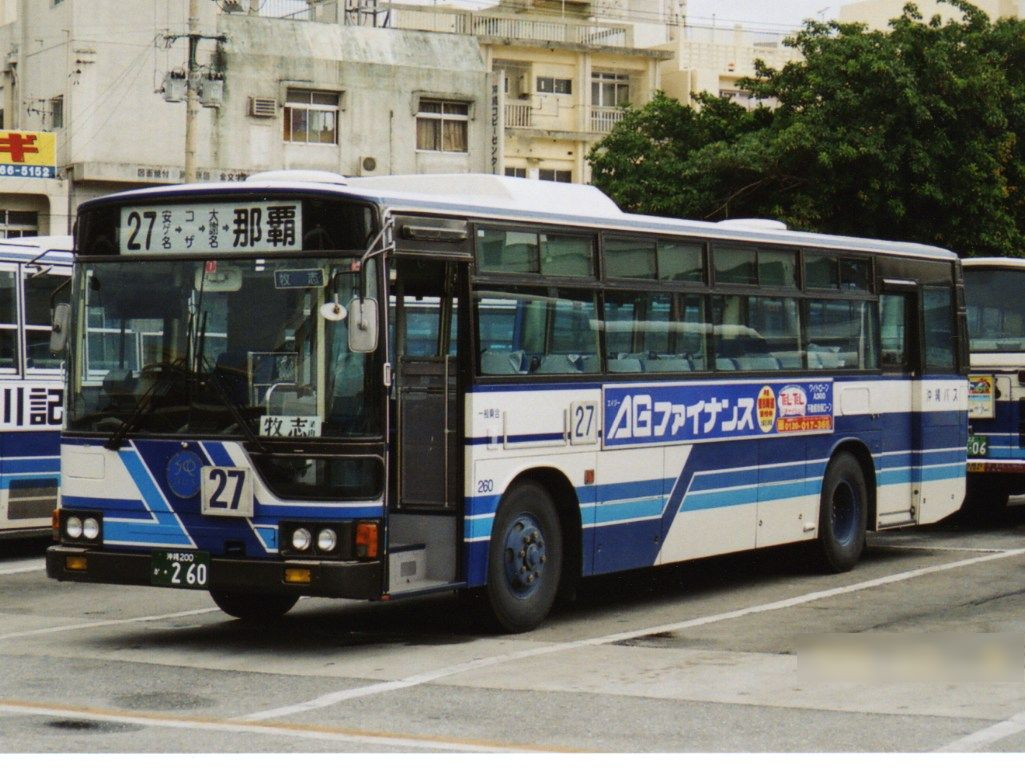
Aero Star K P-MP218M

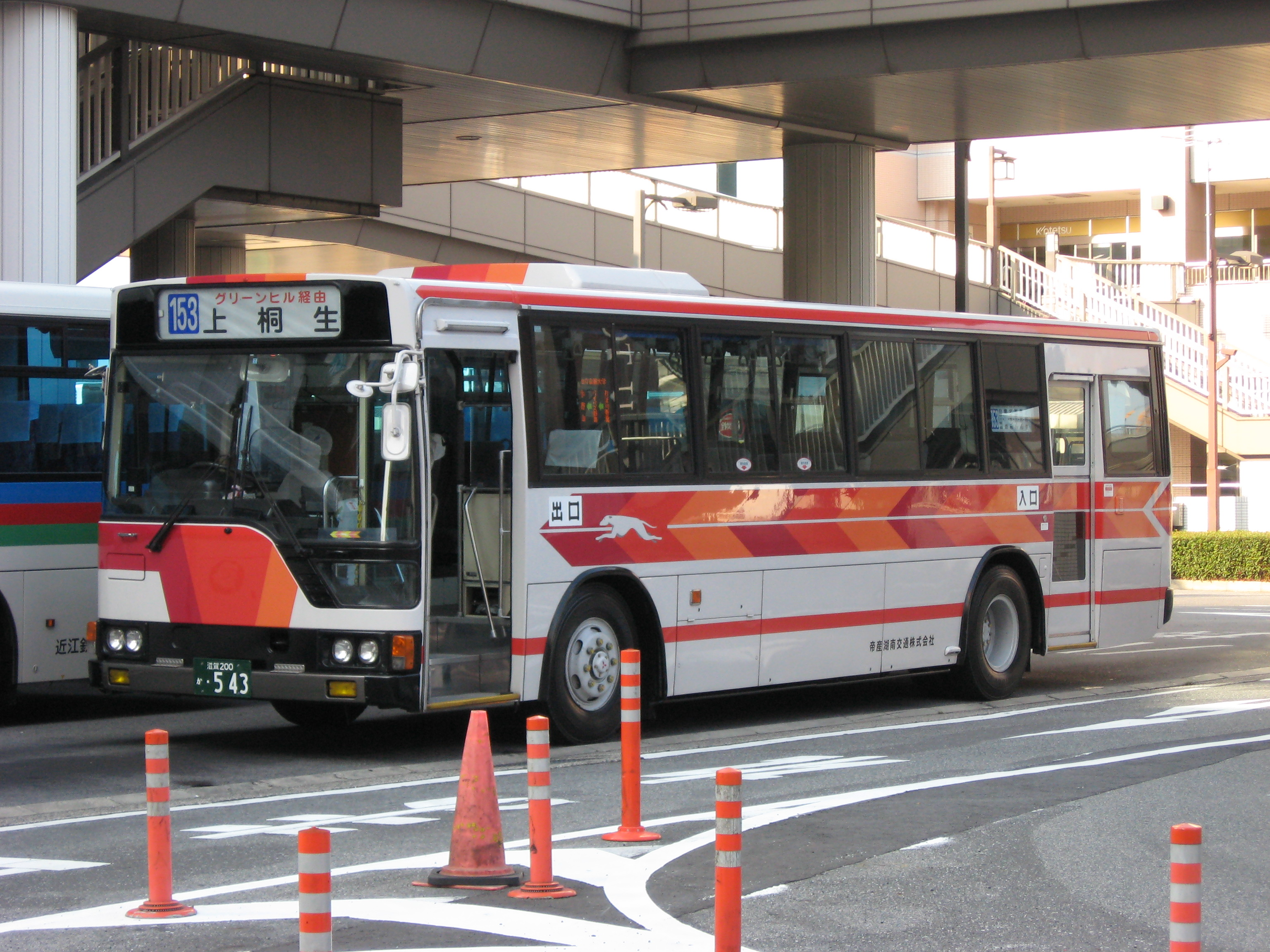
Aero Star M U-MP218M

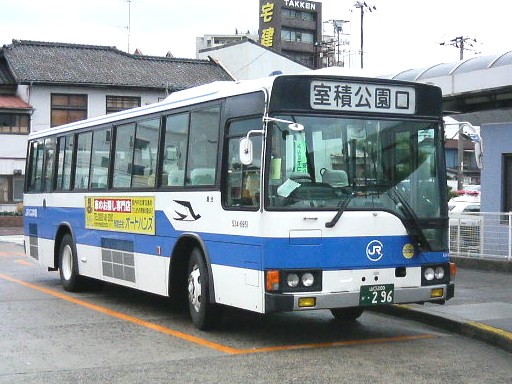
Aero Star M KC-MP617M

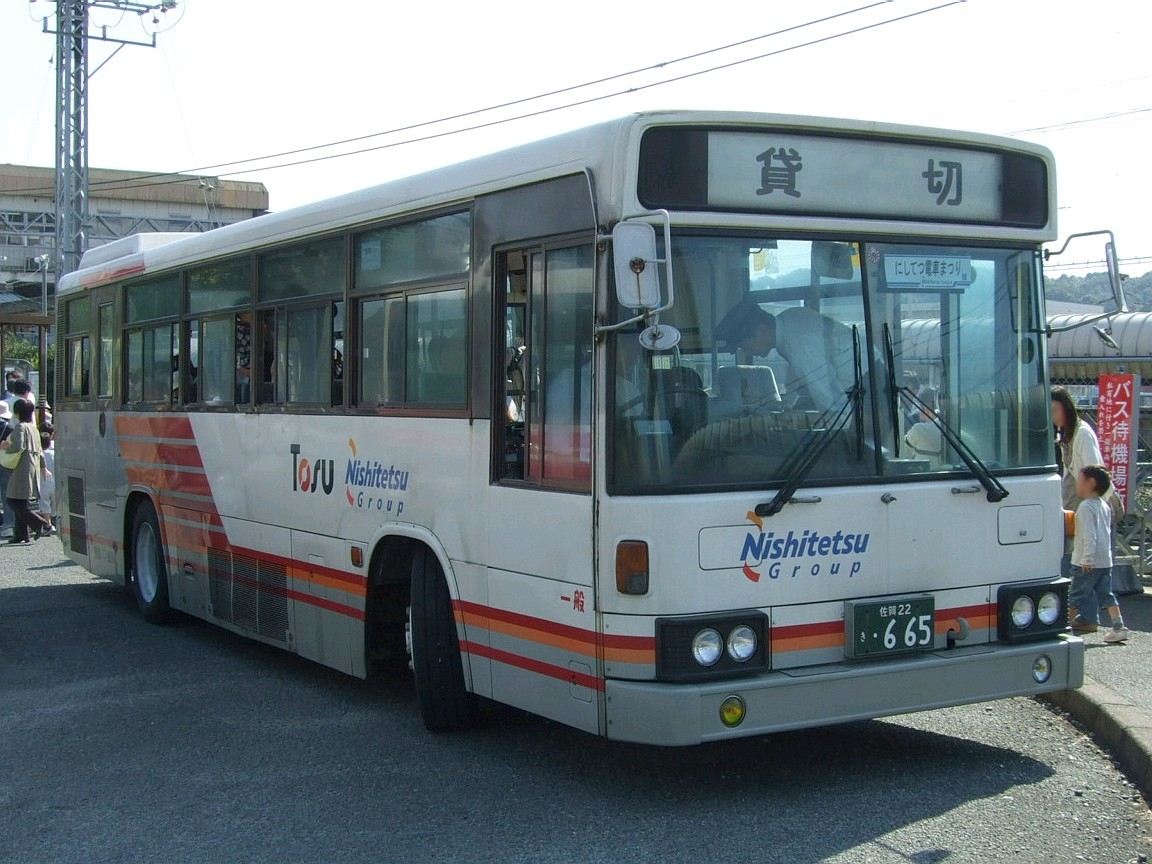
Aero Star (NSK 58MC body) P-MP218K

== Aero Star (second series, 1996–present) ==
- KC-MP317/717K/M/P (1996)
  - KC-MP747K/M (Non-step Low-floor, 1997)
  - KC-MP737K/M (MBECS-III Hybrid Electric)
- KL-MP35/37K/M/P (2000)
  - MP37JM kai (Aero Star HEV Hybrid Electric, 2004)
- PJ-MP35/37JK/M/P (2004)
- PKG-MP35UK/UM/UP (2007)
  - BJG-MP37TK/M (Aero Star Eco Hybrid)
    - 4M50 Engine with 79*2 (158) kW Motor Equipped
  - PKG-MP35UK/M kai (Non-step Low-floor, 2009)
  - Nissan Diesel MD92TJ equipped, with Urea SCR (It requires AdBlue).
- LKG-/QKG-MP35/37FK/M/P (2010)
  - Equipment: 6M60 engine with VGT, BlueTec and Powertard, Allison 6-speed automatic transmission as standard
  - Sold currently in Australia as Fuso School Bus (MP35F) and Fuso City Bus (MP37F)
- QKG-MP35/38FK/M/P (2014)
  - Face-lifted model of MP35/37, wheel bases have extended on MP38.
- 2PG/2KG-MP35/38K/M/P(2017)

Between 2007 and 2011, some Aero Star has been sold as UD Trucks Space Runner A (old name: Nissan Diesel Space Runner A).

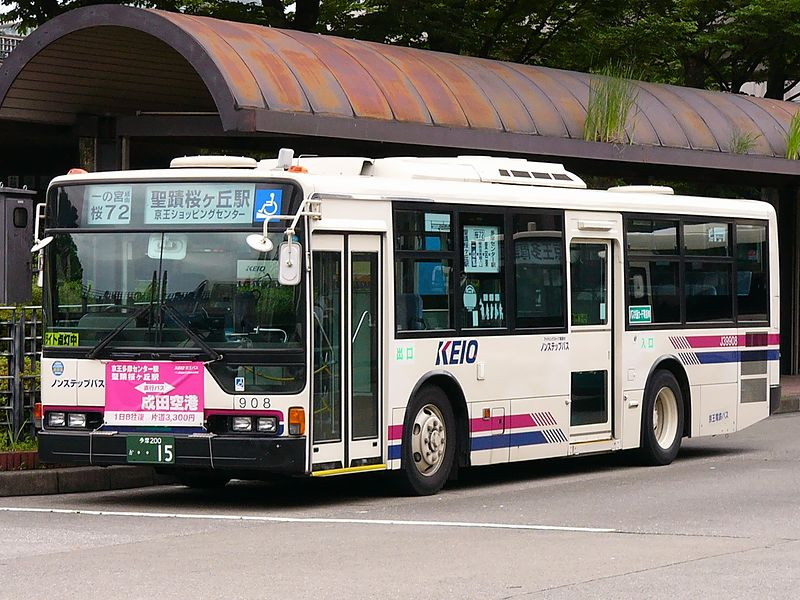
Aero Star KC-MP747K

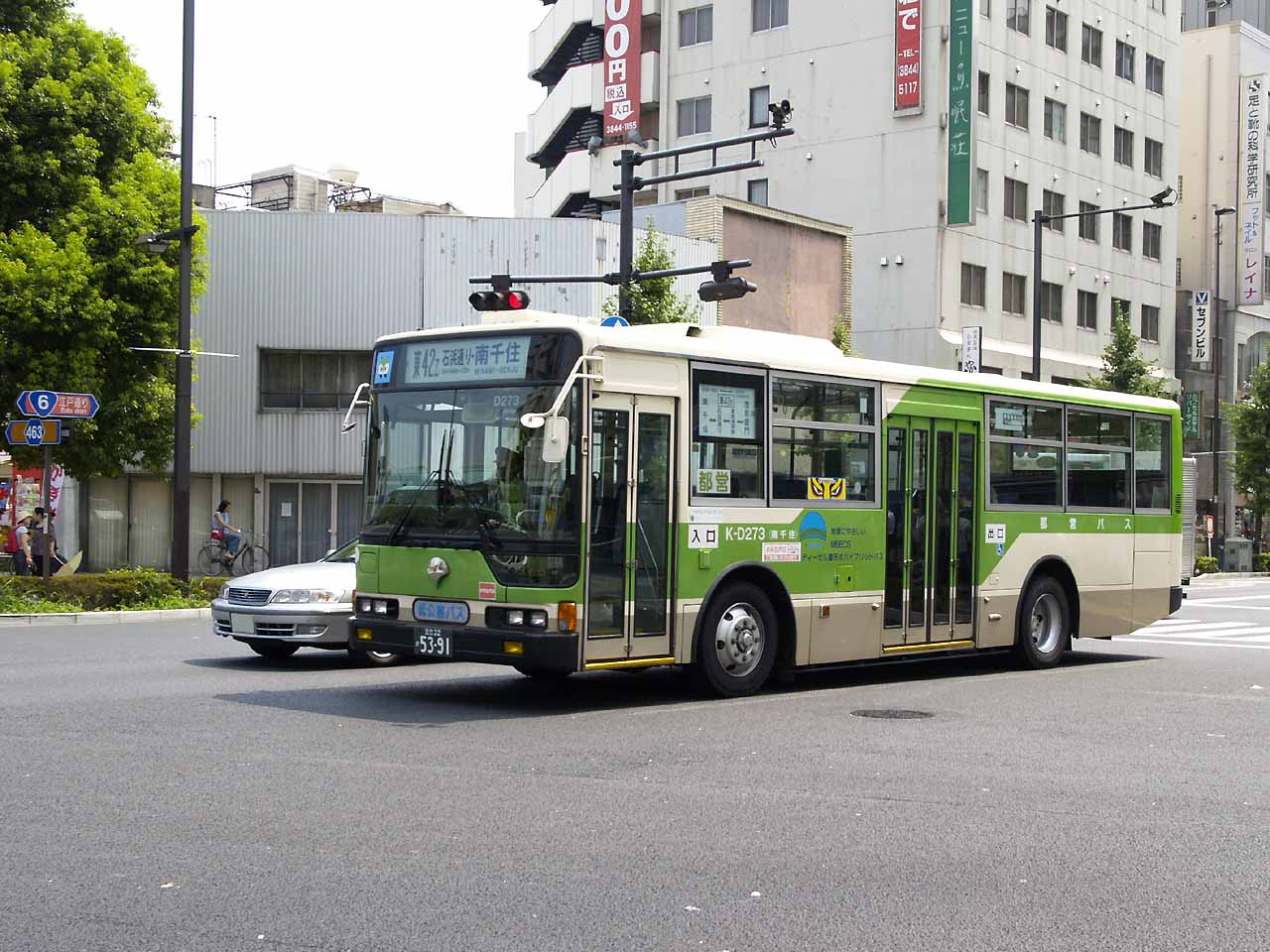
Aero Star MBECS-III KL-MP737K

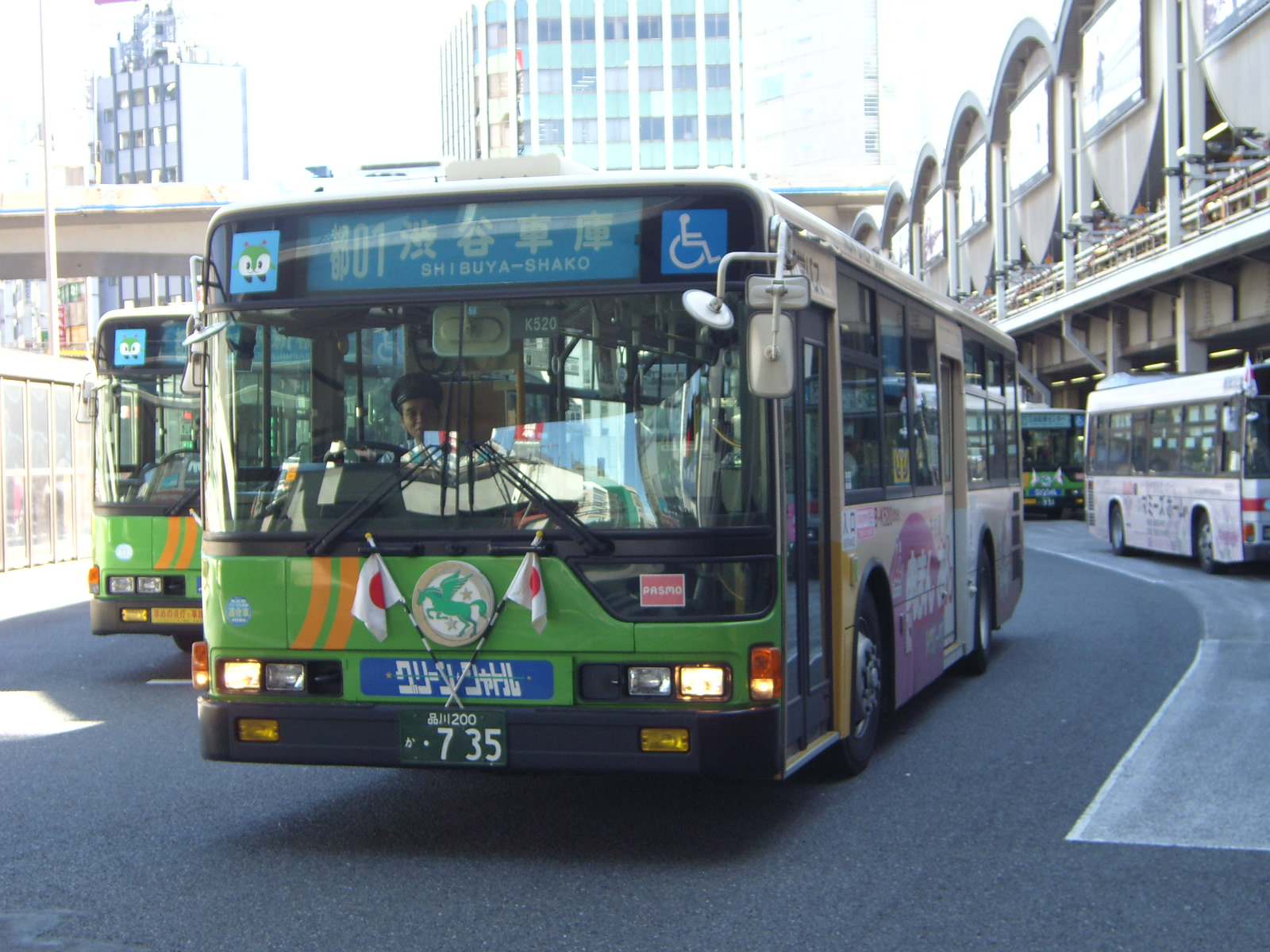
Aero Star KL-MP37JK

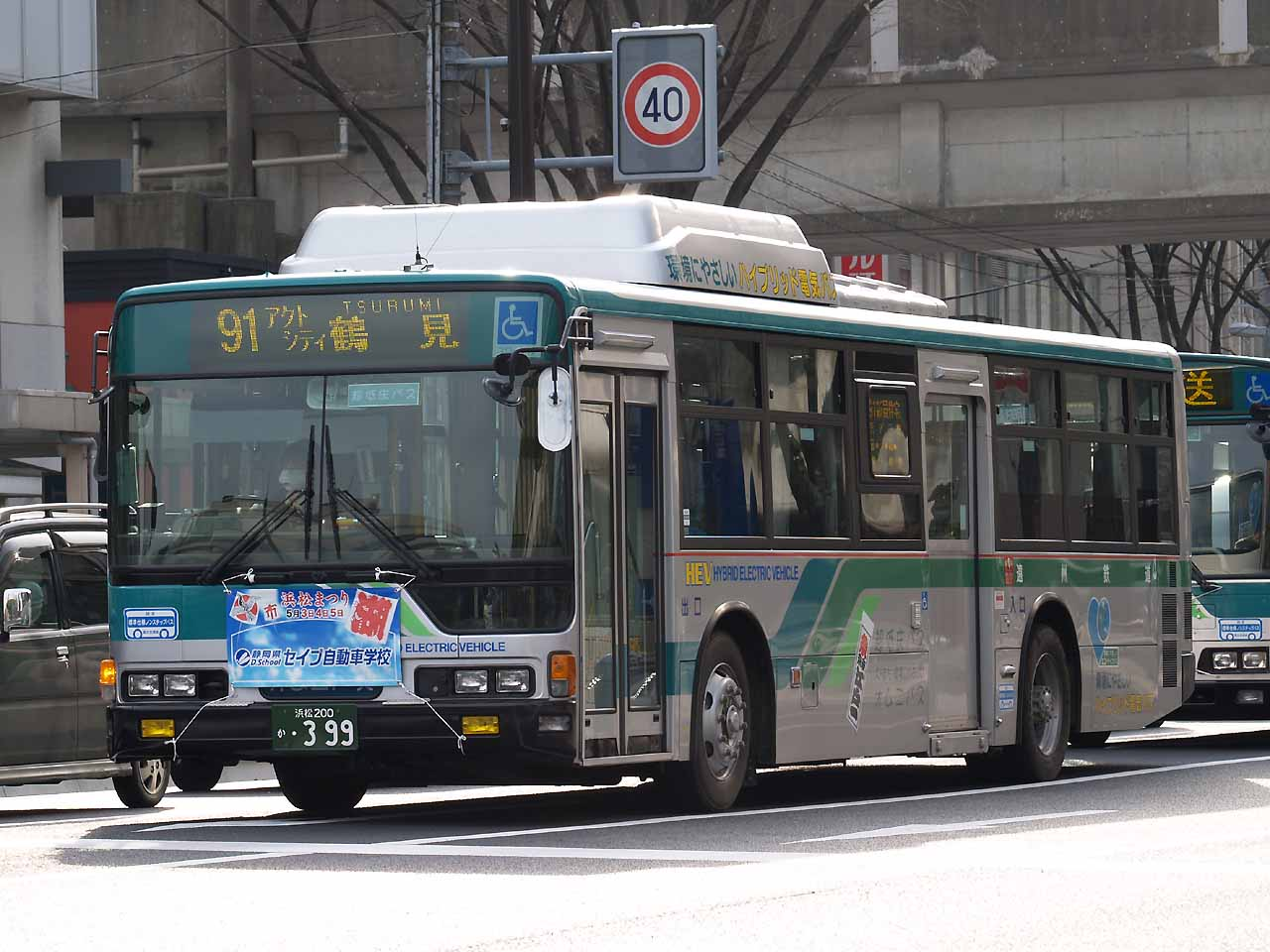
Aero Star HEV MP37JM kai

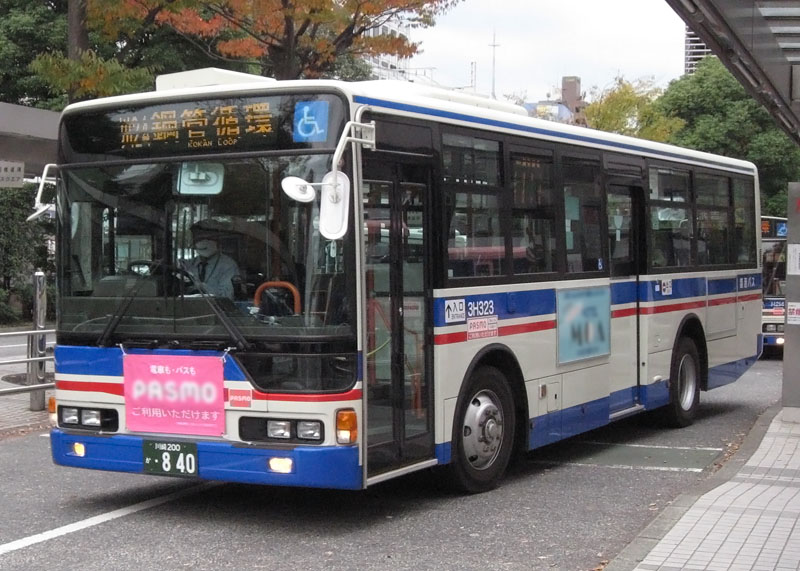
Aero Star PKG-MP35UK

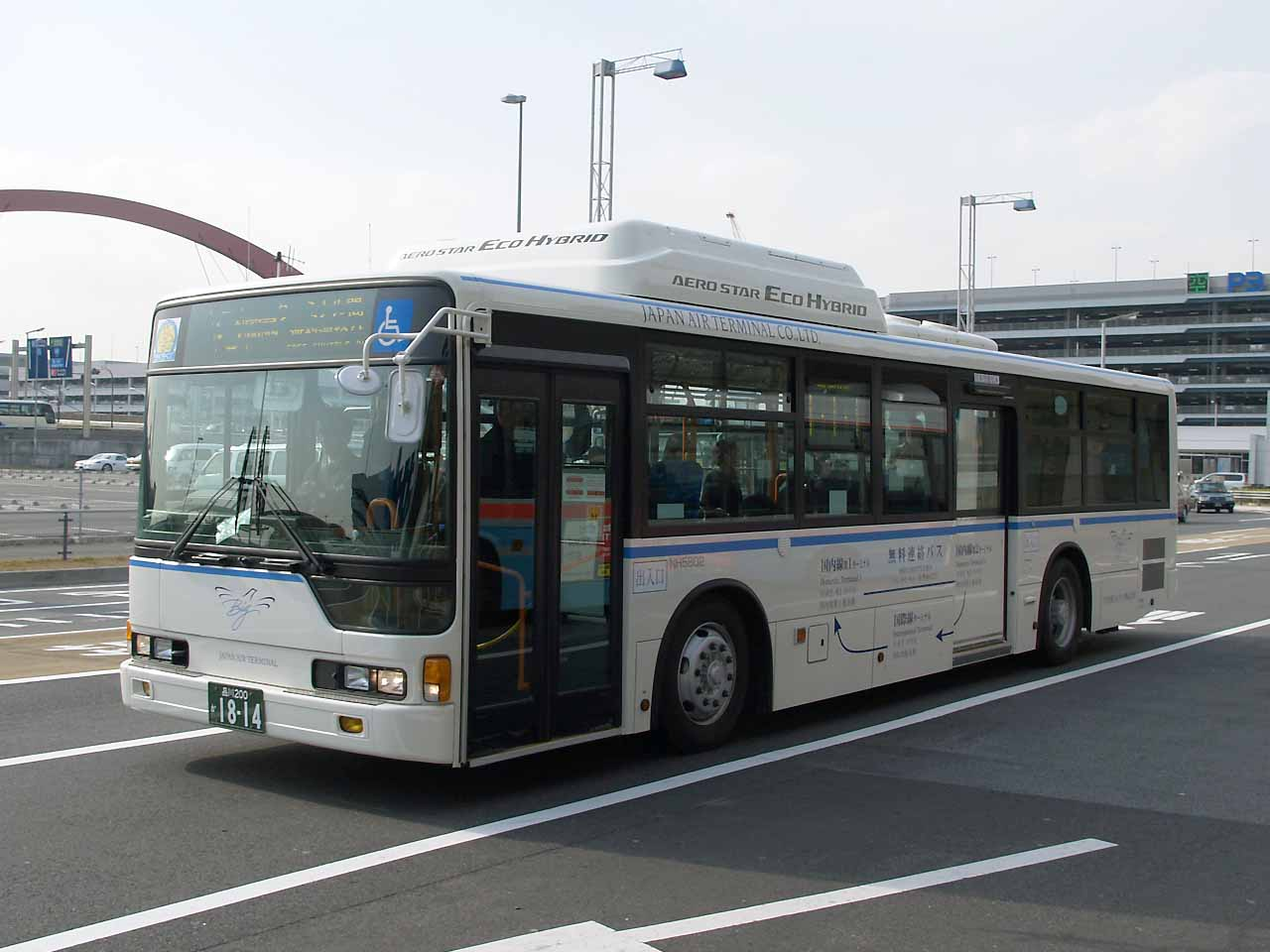
Aero Star Eco Hybrid BJG-MP37TM

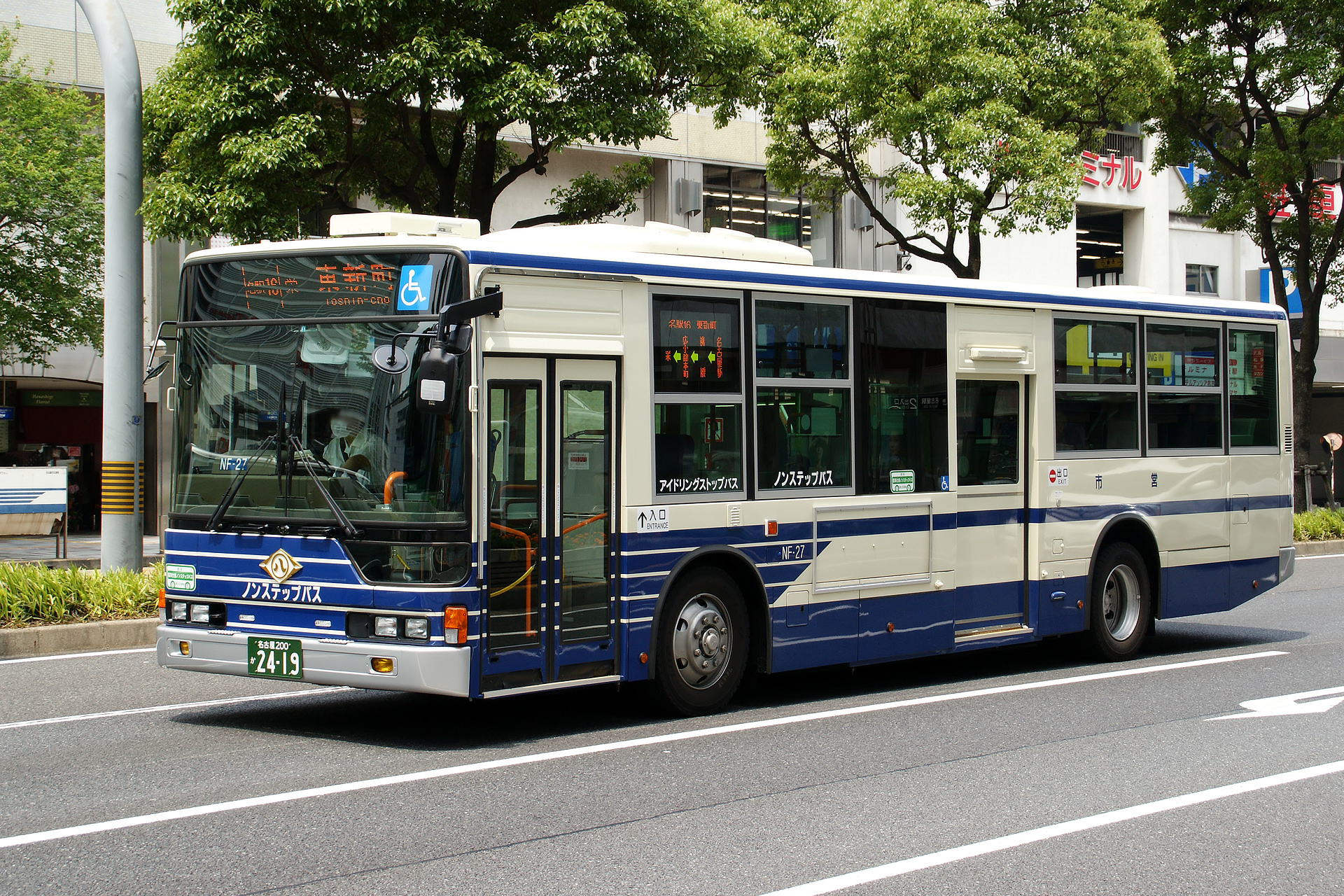
Aero Star Non-step PKG-MP35UM kai

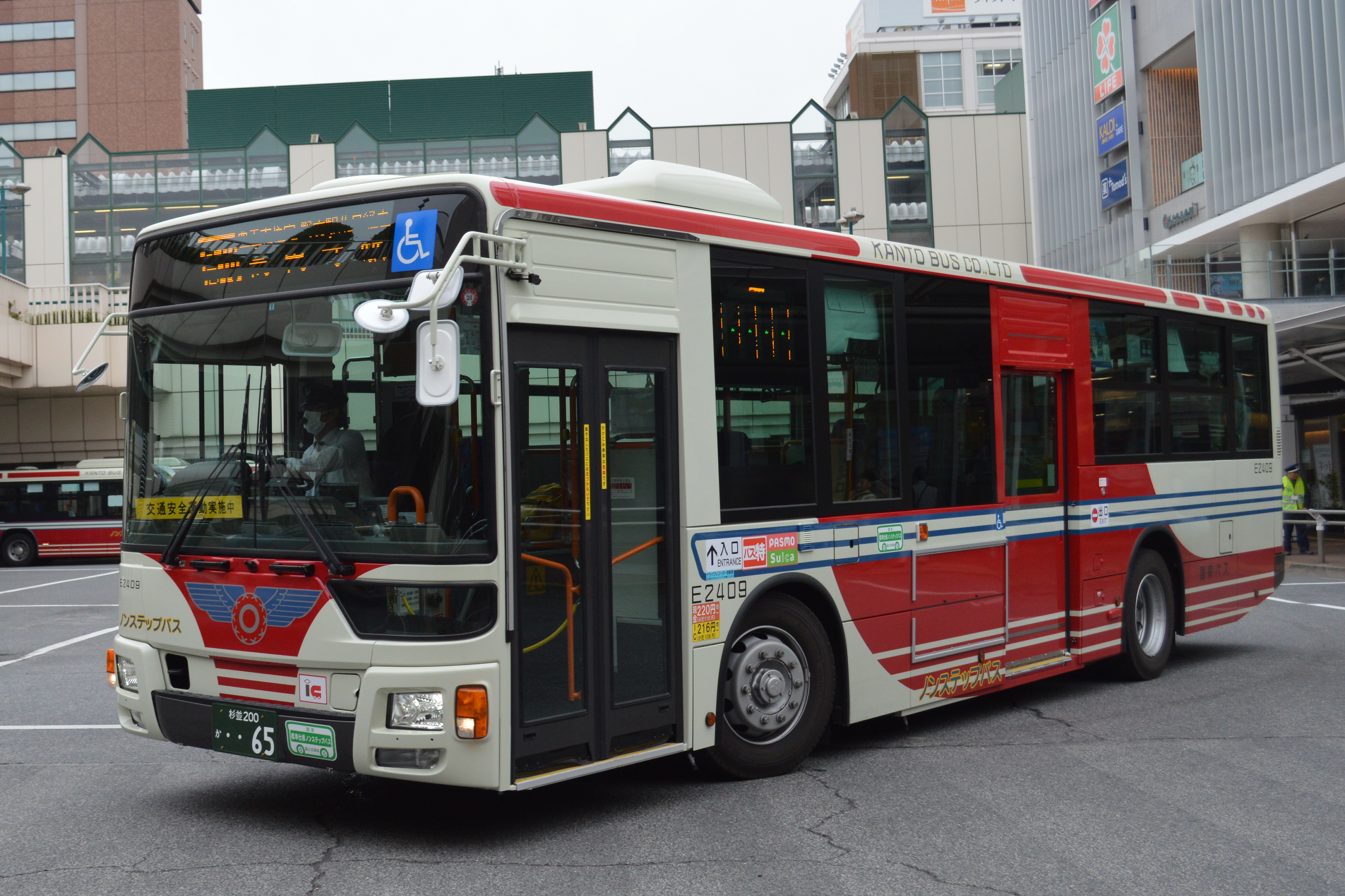
Aero Star QKG-MP38FK

== Aero Star-S ==
The Aero Star-S is the rebadged UD Trucks Space Runner RA (old name: Nissan Diesel Space Runner RA). It has a double-curvature windscreen, rounded roof dome (more rounded than the 1996–present Aero Star) with a separately mounted destination blind.

- PKG-AA274/ADG-AA273 (2007)
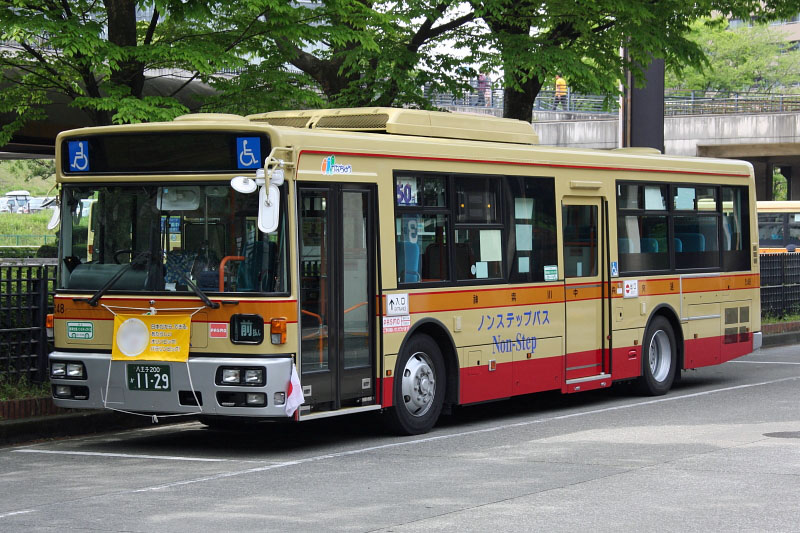
Aero Star-S PKG-AA274MAN

== Transport electrification ==
The Eco Hybrid (diesel-electric bus) is now setting new standards in practical trials in Japan. It can reduce fuel consumption by as much as 30 percent. The Mitsubishi Fuso Aero Star Eco Hybrid operates with a series hybrid drive, in which the diesel engine does not drive wheels directly but instead is used solely to drive an electrical generator to recharge lithium-ion batteries, connected to the two electric motors (with a combined output of 158 kW), which propel the vehicle. Series hybrids are efficient on vehicles like urban buses with low shares of constant or high speed within their driving profile. On trucks like the Mitsubishi Fuso Canter Eco Hybrid Daimler Trucks utilizes - opposed to buses - a parallel hybrid system with an electric Motor-generator on the transmission input shaft. This system maintains better efficiency gains at higher speeds.

Range is 300 km (almost 200 miles).

== See also ==
- Mitsubishi Fuso Truck & Bus Corporation
- List of buses
