= Fuso (company) =

Japanese automobile manufacturer

Mitsubishi Fuso Truck and Bus Corporation

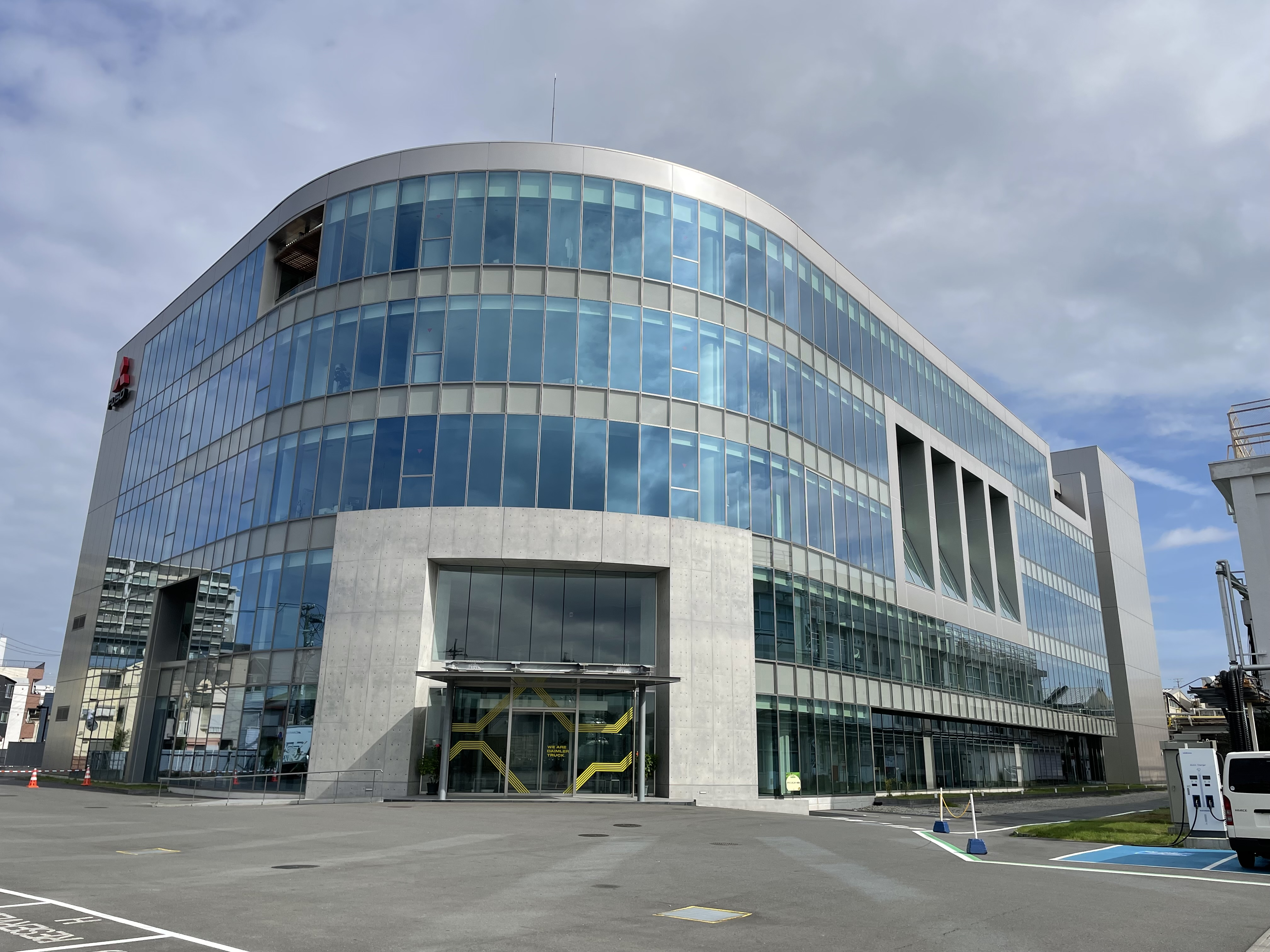
- Headquarters in Nakahara-ku, Kawasaki, Kanagawa
- Native name: 三菱ふそうトラック・バス株式会社
- Type: Subsidiary
- Industry: Commercial vehicles
- Founded: 1932; 94 years ago 2003; 23 years ago (Independent)
- Headquarters: 10 Ōkura-chō, Nakahara-ku, Kawasaki, Kanagawa, Japan
- Key people: Seiichi Nagatsuka (Chairman); Franziska Cusumano (President and CEO)
- Products: Buses and trucks
- Revenue: $7.6 billion (2010)
- Owner: Archion
- Number of employees: About 10,000 (December 2015)
- Parent: Archion
- Subsidiaries: Fuso Trucks America
- Website: mitsubishi-fuso.com

Mitsubishi Fuso Truck and Bus Corporation (Japanese: 三菱ふそうトラック・バス株式会社, Hepburn: Mitsubishi Fusō Torakku・Basu Kabushiki gaisha; MFTBC), doing business as Mitsubishi Fuso (三菱ふそう), or Fuso (ふそう, Fusō), is a Japanese company whose principal business is the manufacturing and sales of diesel trucks, buses, bus chassis, and special-purpose vehicles. Its headquarters are located in Kawasaki, Kanagawa, Japan. The company is a wholly owned subsidiary of Archion since 2026. Following its merger with Hino Motors, the company operates as a subsidiary of Archion.

The Fuso brand traces its origins to 1932, when the first B46 bus was built at the Kobe Works of Mitsubishi Shipbuilding Company (a predecessor of Mitsubishi Heavy Industries). The current corporate entity was established in 2003 when the truck and bus division was spun off from Mitsubishi Motors to form an independent company. Previously a subsidiary of Daimler Truck, Fuso merged with Hino Motors in 2026 and became a subsidiary of the newly formed Archion.

Fuso derives from the ancient Chinese term fusang (扶桑), for a sacred tree said to grow at the spot in the east where the sun rises, and has been used to refer to Japan itself. The actual fuso tree is a hibiscus.

== History ==
=== Mitsubishi Heavy Industries ===
In 1932, the first B46 bus (the Fuso) was built at the Mitsubishi Shipbuilding Company's Kobe Works. Two years later (1934), the Mitsubishi Shipbuilding Company was renamed Mitsubishi Heavy Industries (MHI). Three years after that (1937), the MHI motor-vehicle operations at the Kobe Works were transferred to the Tokyo Works. In 1949, the Fuso Motors Sales Company was established.

In 1950, Mitsubishi Heavy Industries was split into three companies:

- West Japan Heavy Industries.
- Central Japan Heavy Industries.
- East Japan Heavy Industries.

Two years later (1952):

- West Japan Heavy Industries was renamed to Mitsubishi Shipbuilding and Engineering Company.
- Central Japan Heavy Industries was renamed to Shin Mitsubishi Heavy Industries.
- East Japan Heavy Industries was renamed to Mitsubishi Nippon Heavy Industries (MNHI).
- Fuso Motor Sales Company was renamed to the Mitsubishi Fuso Motors Sales Company.

Products from the companies were distributed by Mitsubishi Fuso Motor Sales because of brand recognition.

=== Mitsubishi Fuso Heavy Industries ===
In 1957, MNHI integrated the Tokyo and Kawasaki Works into the Tokyo Motor Vehicle Works. Seven years later (1964), these three companies merged to form Mitsubishi Fuso Heavy Industries;

=== Distribution ===
Mitsubishi Fuso Motors Sales split into two divisions: Shin and Fuso Motors Sales Company.

Sharing a logo, they split the distribution of heavy and light machinery; Shin distributed light machinery branded as Mitsubishi, and Fuso distributed heavy machinery branded as Fuso.

=== Mitsubishi Motor Company ===
In 1970, MFHI signed a joint-venture agreement with Chrysler Corporation, establishing the Mitsubishi Motors Corporation (MMC), and MFHI transferred its motor-vehicle operations to MMC.

In 1975, MMC opened the Nakatsu Plant at its Tokyo Motor Vehicle Works; five years later, it opened the Kitsuregawa Proving Grounds. Four years after that, MMC merged with Mitsubishi Motor Sales Company.

In 1985, MMC and Mitsubishi Corporation established the joint-equity company Mitsubishi Trucks of America in the United States. Eight years later, MMC and Chrysler dissolved their equity partnership. The following year, MMC and Mitsubishi joined to design, build, and distribute the Mitsubishi Lancer.

In 1999, MMC and Volvo joined their truck and bus operations, and Volvo acquired 5% of MMC. Two years later, DaimlerChrysler, formed after Chrysler had merged with Mercedes-Benz owners Daimler-Benz, replaced Volvo as MMC's truck and bus partner and MMC renamed the Tokyo Plant the Truck and Bus Production Office (also known as the Kawasaki Plant).

=== Daimler Truck ===
In 2003, the Mitsubishi Fuso Truck and Bus Corporation (MFTBC) was established. DaimlerChrysler, Mitsubishi Motors Corporation, and other Mitsubishi companies acquired 43, 42, and 15% shares, respectively, in MFTBC.

In 2005, Mitsubishi Motors Corporation transferred its MFTBC shares to DaimlerChrysler as part of their compensation agreement for financial damages resulting from quality problems and recalls at MFTBC. DaimlerChrysler and the Mitsubishi companies hold shares of 89 and 11%, respectively. In 2006, MFTBC moved its headquarters from Tokyo to Kawasaki-shi, Kanagawa; the following year, DaimlerChrysler sold its majority stake in Chrysler Corporation to Cerberus Capital Management. The corporation was renamed Daimler AG and the DaimlerChrysler Truck Group was renamed Daimler Truck, with MFTBC part of the latter.

On May 27, 2020, Mitsubishi Fuso Truck of America announced it was discontinuing new truck sales. The move is a result of a re-evaluation by Mitsubishi Fuso Truck and Bus Corp. of its business situation in the United States and Canada, according to the announcement, as the company shifts to a service-focused operation in these markets.

In May 2023, Fuso and its parent Daimler Truck signed a memorandum of understanding with Hino and its parent Toyota for a plan of merging Hino and Fuso into a publicly traded holding company with "equal investment" from both Toyota and Daimler Truck.

In June 2025, a definitive agreement was reached with an as yet unnamed holding company to list on the Tokyo Stock Exchange with Daimler Truck and Toyota each to own 25% of the holding company. Archion took ownership of Fuso on 1 April 2026.

== Leadership ==
=== Chief Executive Officers ===
- Willfried Port (2003–2005)
- Harald Boelster (2005–2009)
- Albert Kirchmann (2009–2015)
- Mark Llistosella (2015–2018)
- Hartmut Schick (2018–2021)
- Karl Deppen (2021–2026)
- Franziska Cusumano (2026-present)

=== Chairmen ===
- Takashi Usami (2003–2004)
- Michio Hori (2004–2005)
- Keisuke Egashira (2005–2009)
- Takao Suzuki (2009–2015)
- Albert Kirchmann (2015–2017)
- Kazuo Matsunaga (2017–2025)
- Seiichi Nagatsuka (2025–present)

== Facilities ==
Fuso trucks are developed and built primarily at these Japanese facilities:

- Kitsuregawa Proving Ground
- Kawasaki Plant and Research and Development Center
- Nakatsu Plant, Aikawa, Kanagawa
- Mitsubishi Fuso Bus Manufacturing Company in Toyama, Toyama

Mitsubishi Fuso Canter work-trucks are manufactured in Indonesia, Egypt, Tramagal (Portugal), the Philippines, Venezuela, Turkey, and Russia. They are marketed in Japan, Europe, Australia, New Zealand, and a number of other Asian countries, as well as in the United States.

Fuso trucks are also manufactured in India at the Daimler India Commercial Vehicles plant in Oragadam, near Chennai. Those vehicles are sold in East Africa and Southeast Asia. Mitsubishi Fuso's European marketing and sales headquarters is in Stuttgart.

== Products ==
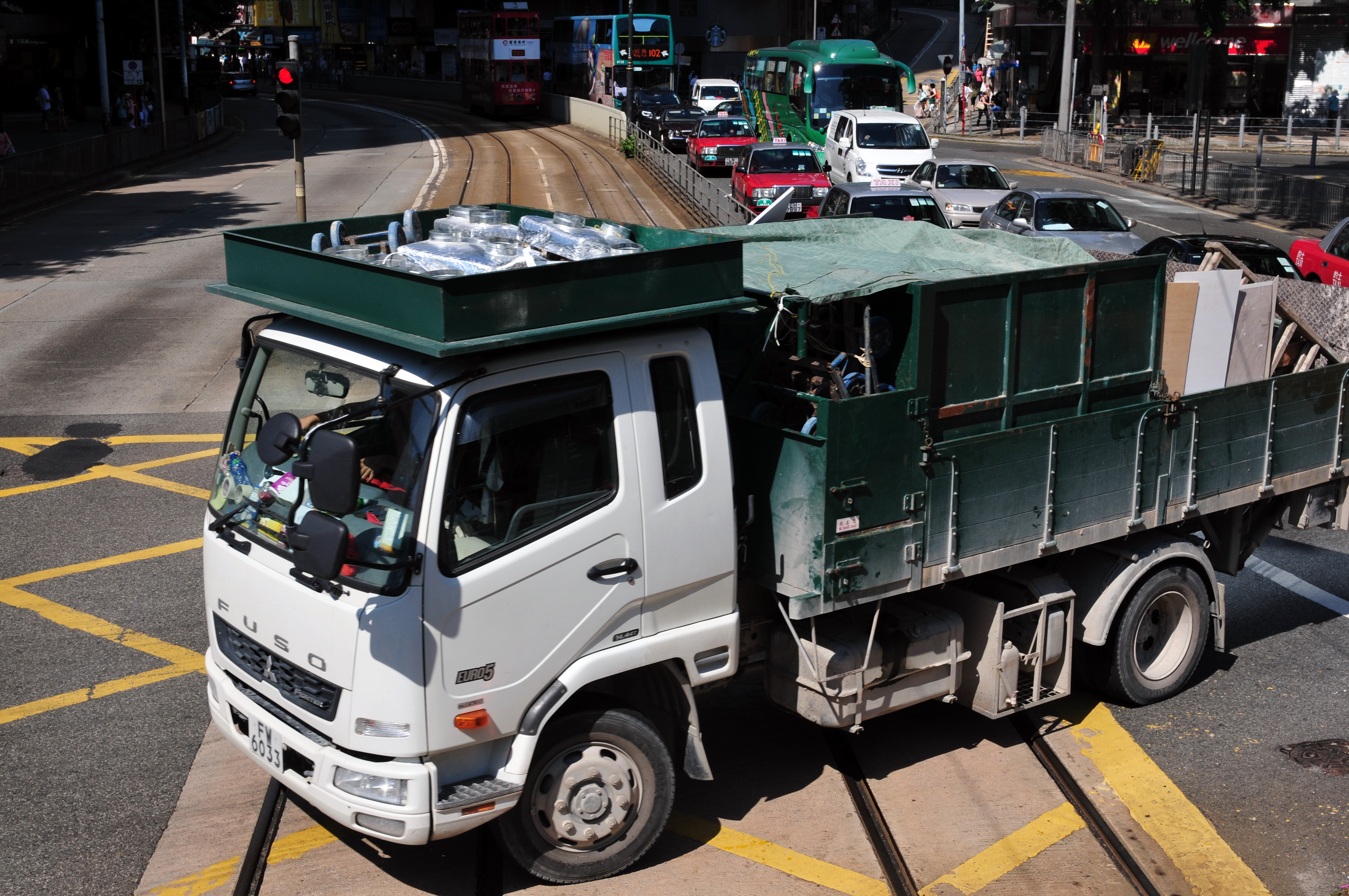
Fuso Fighter in Hong Kong, 2013

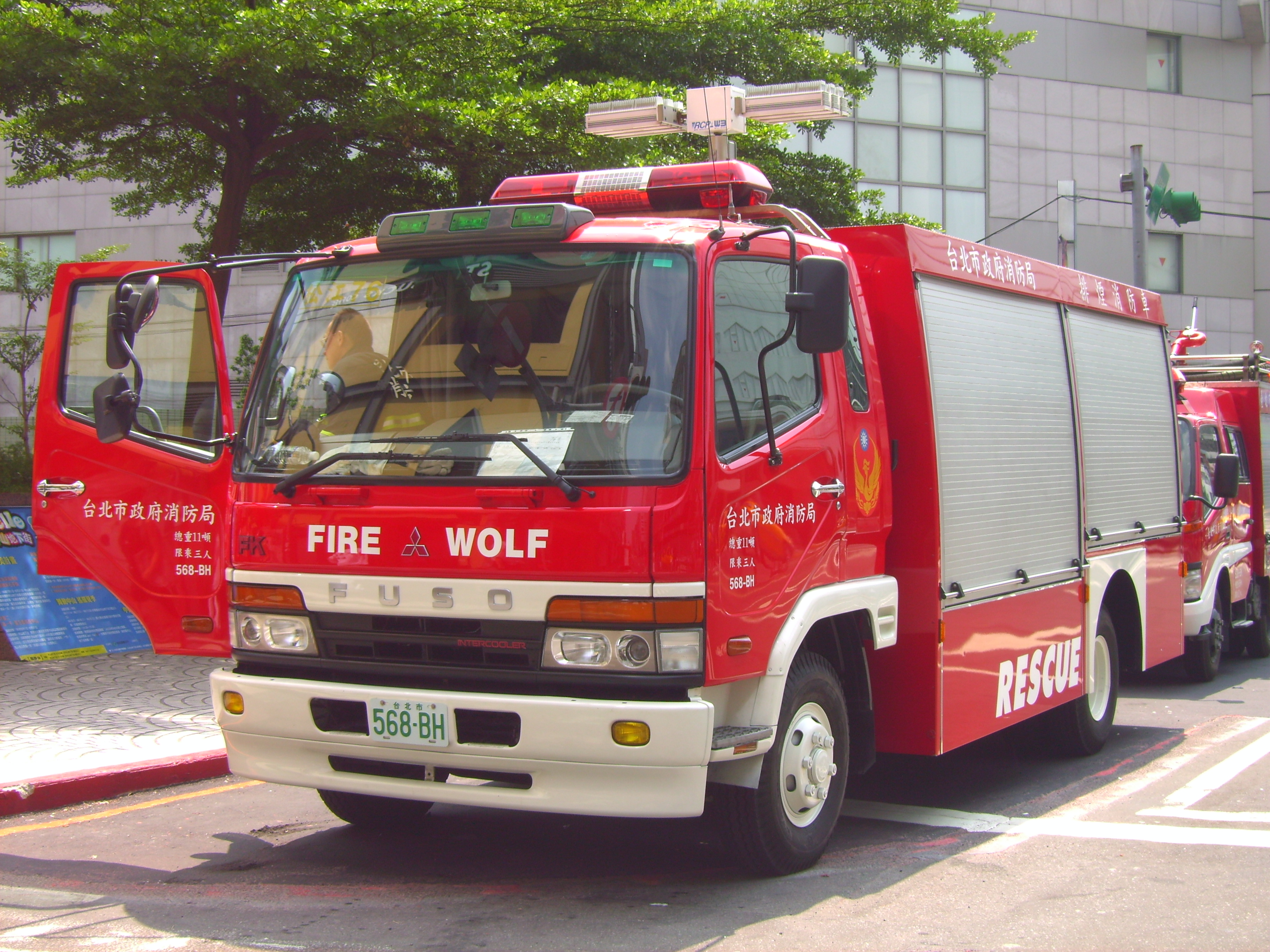
Fuso FK fire engine

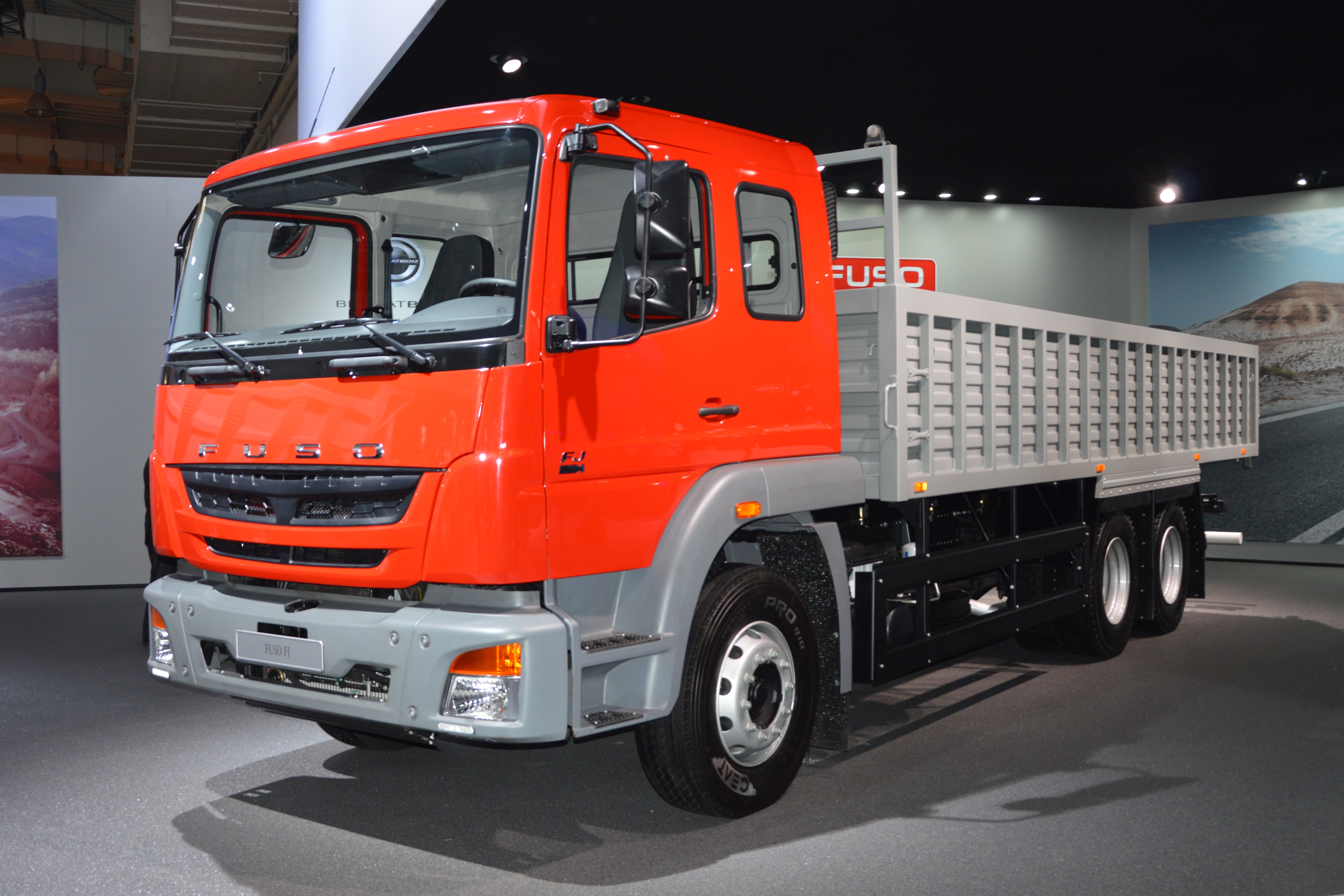
Fuso FJ rigid truck, made in India, at the International Motor Show 2014 in Hanover, Germany

=== Van ===
- Canter Van (OEM Nissan Caravan, export only)

=== Trucks ===
- Canter aka FE/FF/FG/FH, formerly also rebadged and sold as the Sterling 360
- Canter Guts (Canter Mini FA/FB/FC/FD)
- Canter Eco Hybrid
- Fighter aka FH/FK/FM/FL (3rd OEM Hino Ranger)
- The Great
- Super Great/Heavy Duty aka FP/FS/FV
- Fuso Shogun (manufactured in New Zealand)
- Fuso FJ (manufactured in India by BharatBenz for export)
- Fuso TV (manufactured in Malaysia and Thailand)
- Fuso FI

=== Buses and chassis ===
- Rosa
- Aero Midi MK/MJ/ME
- Aero Star MP
- Aero King
- Aero Ace/Bus/Queen MS
- Mitsubishi Cruiser
- Mitsubishi Eagle
- Fuso BK125L (Bus chassis)
- Fuso BM115/116/117/118 (Bus chassis)
- Fuso FE84G (Bus chassis)
- Fuso RK (Bus chassis)
- Fuso RM (Bus chassis)
- Fuso RP (Bus chassis)
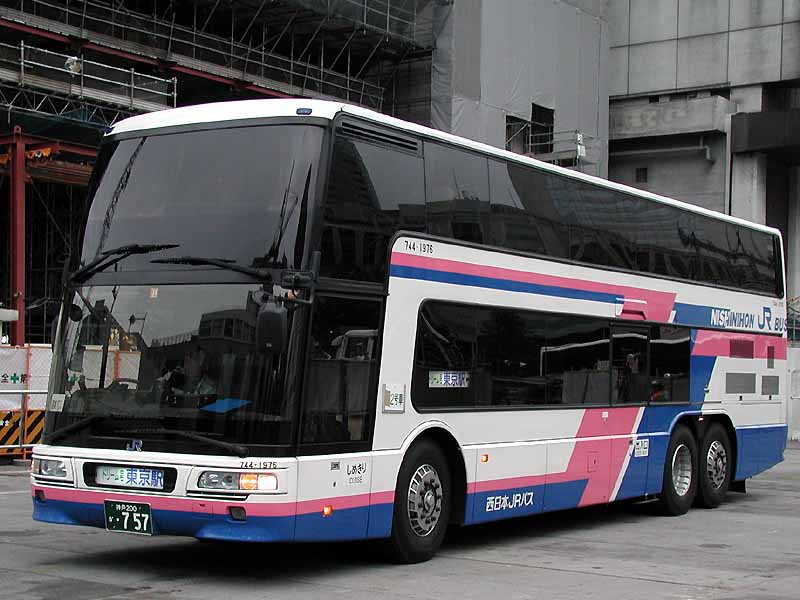
A Fuso Aero King is operated by Nishinihon JR Bus Co., in Japan.

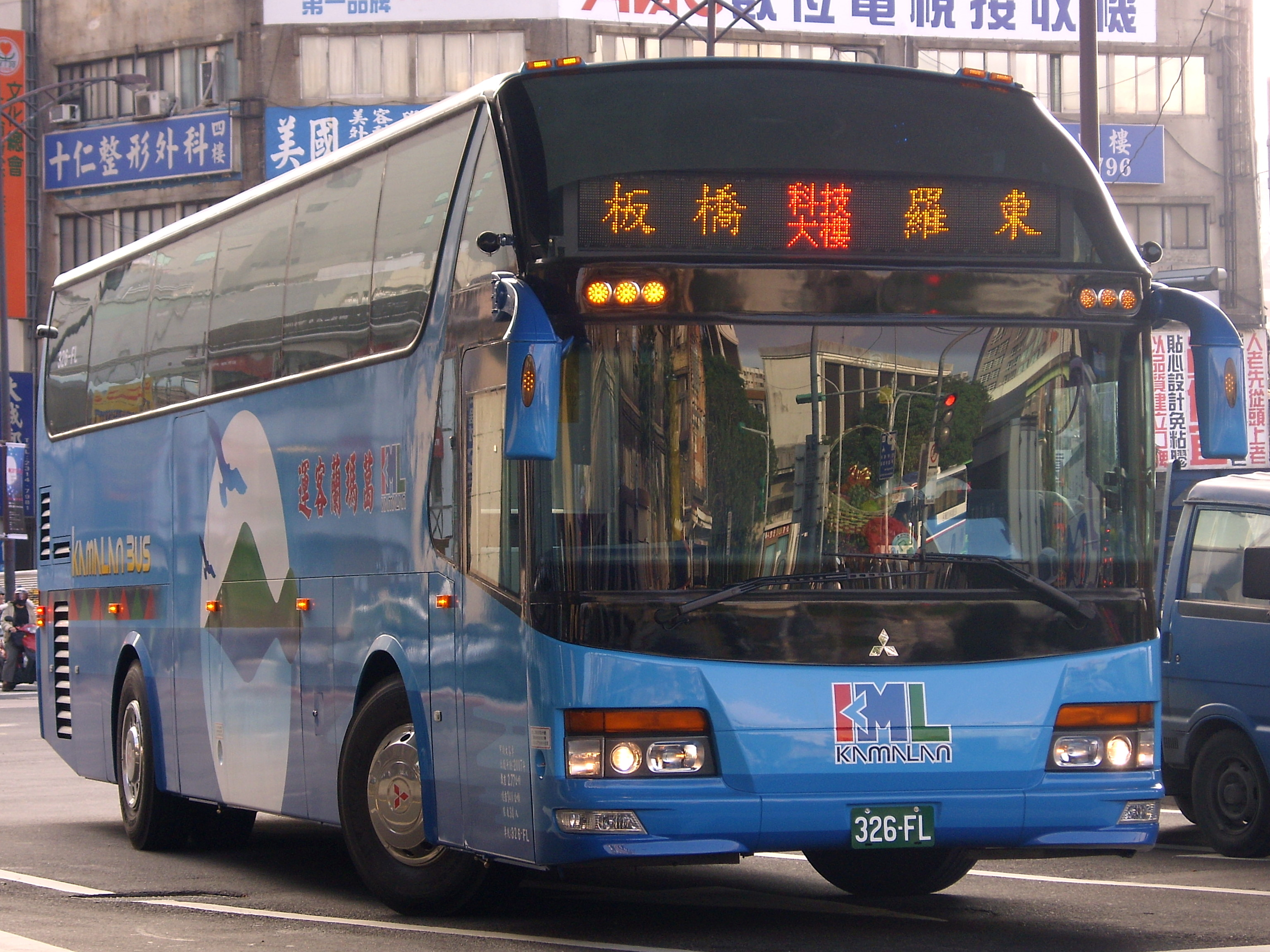
A Fuso RM bus is operated by Kamalan Bus Inc. in Taiwan.

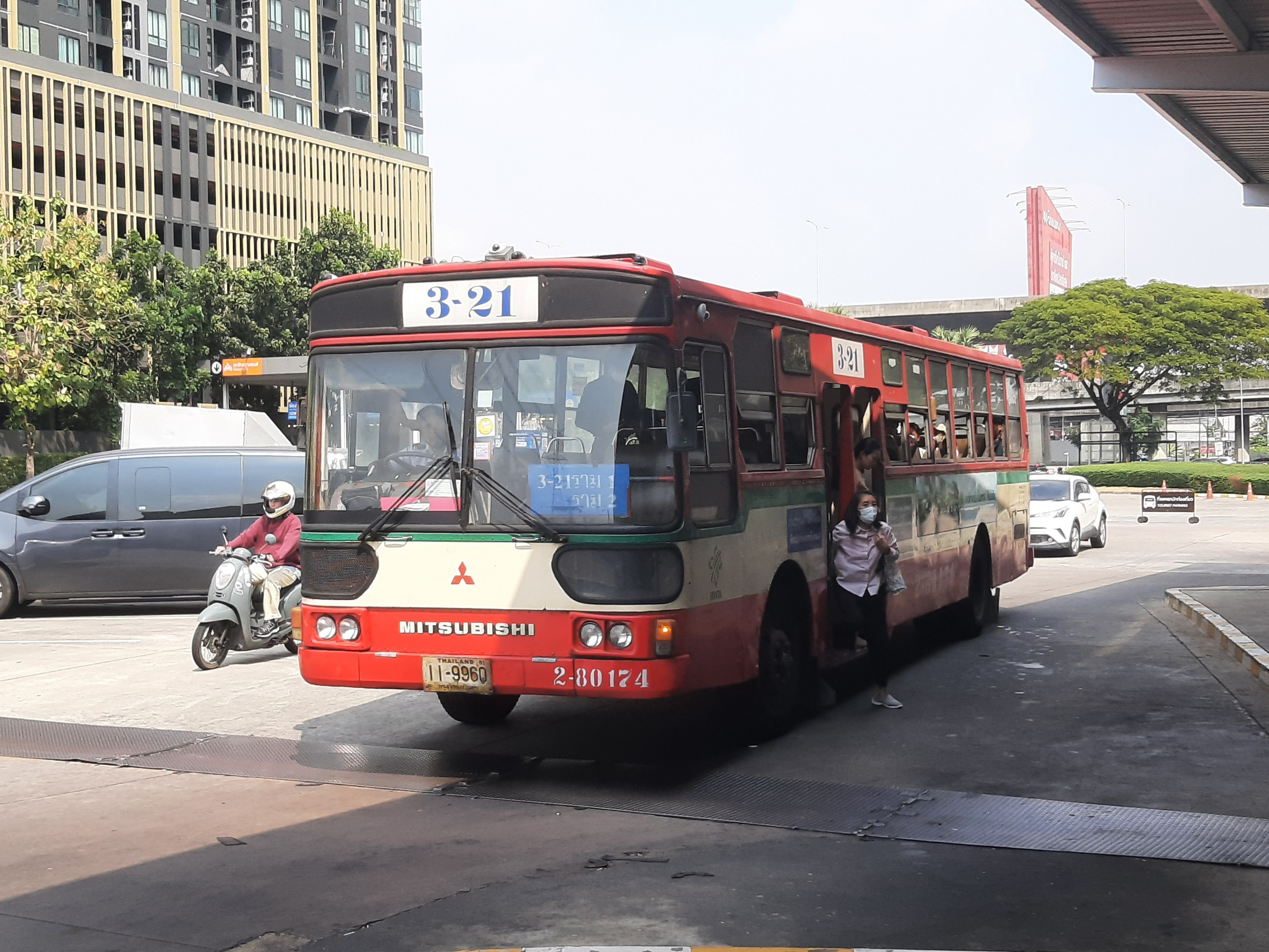
A Fuso RP118 bus is operated by BMTA in Thailand.

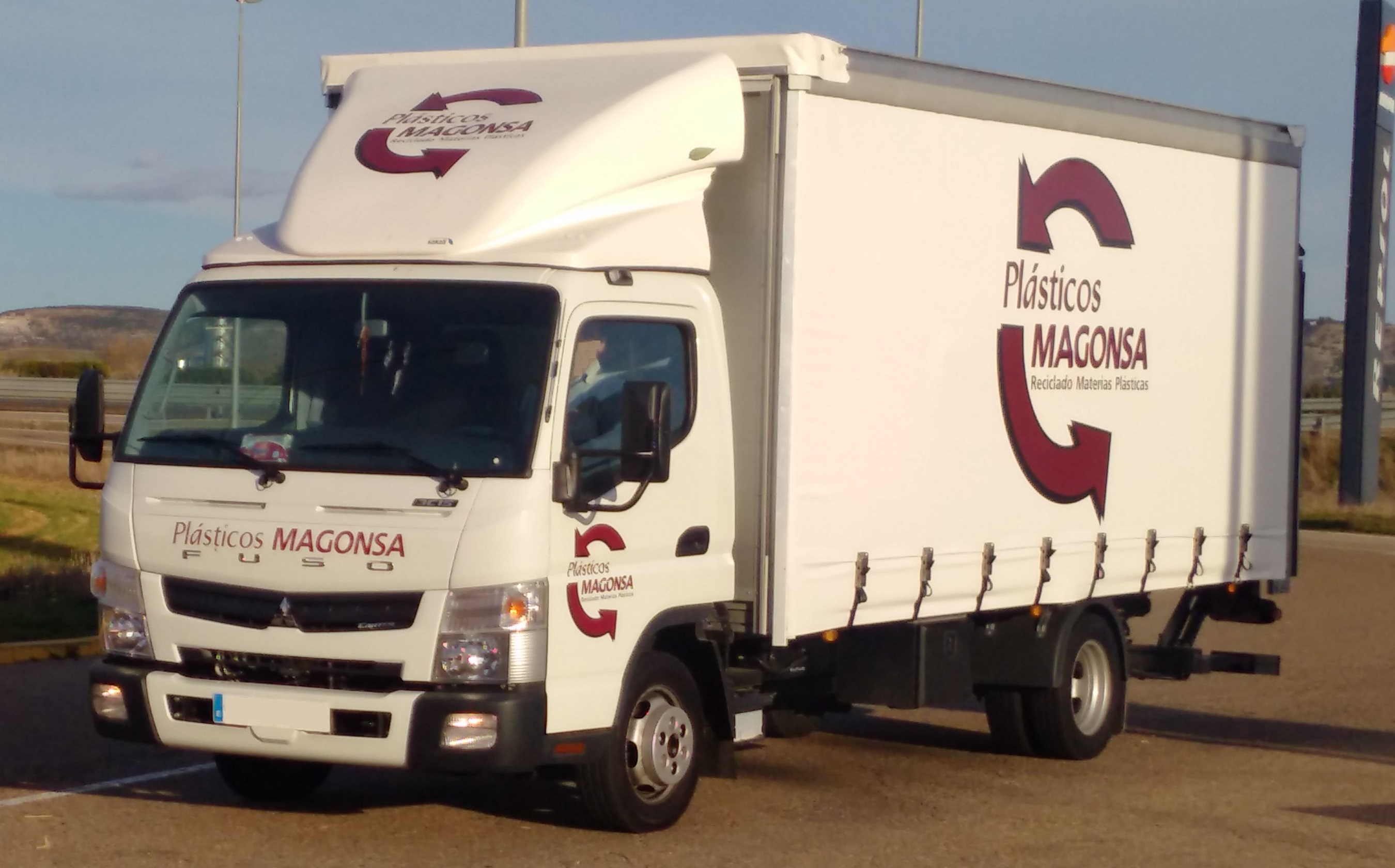
Fuso Canter, 8th Generation in Dueñas, Spain.

== Electric transport ==
The Mitsubishi Fuso Aero Star diesel-electric bus is being tested in Japan. According to the company, it can reduce fuel consumption by as much as 30%. The Aero Star uses a series hybrid drive, where its diesel engine drives an electric generator to recharge lithium-ion batteries connected to the two electric motors with a combined output of 158 kW, which propel the vehicle. Series hybrids are efficient on urban buses. Opposed to the buses the Mitsubishi Fuso Canter Eco Hybrid uses a parallel hybrid system with an electric Motor-generator on the transmission input shaft. This system maintains better efficiency gains at higher speeds.

== Global distribution ==
Outside Japan, vehicles manufactured by the corporation are sold in:

- Latin America by Mitsubishi Motors, Daimler, and independent dealers (in Mexico, some Fuso vehicles are offered in Freightliner trademark, to replace the Sterling Trucks image that previously badged some trucks such as Canter and Super Great)
- Asia by Mitsubishi Motors, Mitsubishi Fuso Company, and Daimler independent dealers
- Middle East by Mitsubishi Motors and independent dealers
- Africa by Mitsubishi and independent dealers in Rwanda by Akagera Business Group
- Oceania by Daimler-Mercedes-Benz, Mitsubishi Motors, Fuso, and independent dealers
- Europe by Daimler Truck and dealers
