= Mitsubishi Fuso Canter Eco Hybrid =

The Mitsubishi Fuso Canter Eco Hybrid is a hybrid diesel-electric commercial truck made and sold by the Mitsubishi Fuso Truck and Bus Corporation in Japan. The vehicle is being produced at the company’s Kawasaki Manufacturing Plant, in Kawasaki City, Kanagawa Prefecture, Japan.

It combines a compact clean-burning diesel engine, an electric motor/generator, and advanced lithium-ion batteries in a drive train that utilizes a high-efficiency automated transmission. The result is a medium-duty truck that achieves up to 30% better fuel economy in delivery applications and also produces significantly less emissions than its standard diesel-only model.

The small, efficient, 123 hp turbocharged diesel engine is the same one utilized in conventional medium-duty truck service in Japan for several years. It is coupled to a slim 47 hp brushless permanent-magnet synchronous electric motor/generator.

The truck was shown at the National Work Truck Show in Atlanta, GA, and at the Mid-America Trucking Show in Louisville, KY, during March 2006.

== Usage ==
DHL Japan has been using the Canter Eco Hybrid truck for collection and delivery of small and medium-sized packages in Ohta-ku (Omori Minami, Omori Higashi, Nishi Koujiya, Higashi Koujiya, Haneda, Hon Haneda, Haginaka, and Kamata) since July 20, 2006.

== Models 1993 mitsubishi truck ==
=== Australia ===
- 815 Eco-Hybrid Wide Cab MWB/LWB (Duonic only)

== Other electric vehicles of the Group ==
=== Mitsubishi Fuso ===
- Mitsubishi Fuso Aero Star

=== Mercedes-Benz ===
- Mercedes-Benz Atego BlueTec Hybrid
