= Hyliion Holdings =

American energy technology company

Hyliion
- Type: Public
- Traded as: AMEX: HYLN
- Industry: Energy technology
- Founded: 2015; 11 years ago in Pittsburgh, Pennsylvania
- Founder: Thomas Healy
- Headquarters: Cedar Park, Texas, U.S.
- Key people: Thomas Healy (CEO); Jon Panzer (CFO); Josh Mook (CTO); Cheri Lantz (CSO)
- Products: KARNO Generator
- Revenue: ▲US$3.48 million (2025)
- Net income: ▼ −US$57.2 million (2025)
- Website: hyliion.com

Hyliion Holdings Corp. is an American manufacturer of modular power generators based in Cedar Park, Texas. It started as an electrified Class 8 powertrain systems manufacturer before shifting toward power generation following the acquisition of the KARNO generator from GE Aerospace.

== History ==
Hyliion was founded in 2015 by Thomas Healy in Pittsburgh, Pennsylvania, while studying mechanical engineering at Carnegie Mellon University. The company developed hybrid electric drivetrains for Class 8 trucks, including the Trailer Hybrid Electric (HE) system and the 6X4HE hybrid axle.

In 2018, Hyliion relocated to Cedar Park, Texas, following approval of an economic incentives package from the Cedar Park City Council. During this period, Hyliion acquired Gentherm's battery division.

In 2020, Hyliion merged with Tortoise Acquisition Corp., a special-purpose acquisition company (SPAC). At the time of the merger, the company was valued at US$1.6 billion. In October 2020, activist short-seller Bonitas Research published a critical report in which it disputed Hyliion's claim that its hybrid retrofit system delivered up to 30% fuel efficiency improvements and asserted that only a portion of the customers listed in Hyliion's investor presentations had actually purchased its Hybrid-X system.

In August 2022, Hyliion acquired KARNO generator technology from GE Additive for $37 million.

In November 2023, Hyliion shifted its focus to the KARNO generator. As part of this transition, Hyliion discontinued its powertrain business and reduced its workforce by two-thirds.

In January 2025, Hyliion installed an M Line additive manufacturing system in the United States from Colibrium Additive for production support.

== KARNO generator technology ==
The KARNO generator, developed by GE, is a fuel-agnostic linear generator. It operates on natural gas, hydrogen, propane, diesel, ammonia, and methane without mechanical modification. The KARNO system produces power through a flameless, low-temperature oxidation process.

The generator uses synchronized linear motion to drive a thermodynamic cycle within a hermetically sealed system.
