= Ten Outstanding Red Cross Youth =

Ten Outstanding Red Cross Youth (TORCY) of the Philippines
- Logo of the Ten Outstanding Red Cross Youth of the Philippines
- Launched: 2003
- Affiliations: Philippine Red Cross

The Search for the Ten Outstanding Red Cross Youth of the Philippines is an annual search for exceptional Red Cross Youth volunteers who have rendered unselfish service of excellence to the Philippine Red Cross. It aims to recognize the volunteers for their invaluable support and contribution to the PRC through the Red Cross Youth.

== History ==
Launched in 2003, the first batch was awarded with a simple but meaningful ceremony on October 31 at the National Headquarters in Manila. With the initiative of the 14th National Youth Council Officers, the award system was improved and the search was renewed with the awarding of the 2006 TORCY.

Chapter	Number of Awardee
La Union-San Fernando City	6
Negros Occidental-Bacolod City	7
Davao City	6
Manila	5
Laguna	4
Rizal	5
Cotabato	3
Iloilo	4
Bohol	2
Bulacan	2
Misamis Oriental-Cagayan de Oro City	2
Pangasinan - Dagupan City-San Carlos City	2
Valenzuela City	2
Capiz	1
Baguio City	1
Agusan Del Norte - Butuan City	1
Cagayan	1
Caloocan City	1
Camarines Sur	1
General Santos City - Sarangani	1
Isabela	1
Misamis Occidental - Oroquieta City	1
Olongapo City	1
South Cotabato	1
Sulu	1
Tarlac	1
Western Samar	1
Zamboanga City	1

== 2003 Awardees ==
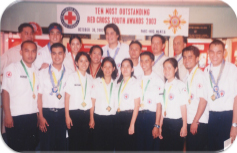
Ten Outstanding Red Cross Youth 2003

The awarding was held on October 31, 2003 at the National Headquarters of the Philippine Red Cross in Port Area, Manila.

Awardee	Chapter
ALCANTAR, Vanessa D.	Misamis Oriental - Cagayan de Oro City
GALLARDO, Carlos Benigno S.	La Union - San Fernando City
PABION, Ramoncito F.	Rizal
PELOS, Paul Ritchie G.	Agusan del Norte - Butuan City
RAYMUNDO, Ma. Verginia T.	Laguna
REQUILLAO, Jaime L. Jr.	Baguio City
SANGGO, Alma G.	General Santos City
SEBASTIAN, Alyssa Chrystine G.	Zamboanga City
TODA, Enrique A. Jr.	Negros Occidental - Bacolod City
YU, Michael Rico C.	Western Samar

== 2004 Awardees ==
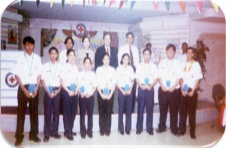
Ten Outstanding Red Cross Youth 2004

The awarding was held at the National Headquarters of the Philippine Red Cross in Port Area, Manila.

Awardee	Chapter
ACAC, Rizalene P.	Davao City
ANDALLO, Irish Cristine S.	Laguna
CARTA, Charlie Jones N.	General Santos City - Sarangani
CATBAGAN, Janice L.	La Union - San Fernando City
OPLE, Kevin Francis B.	Bulacan
ORDANIEL, Eric L.	Negros Occidental - Bacolod City
QUILAB, Glen T.	Misamis Occidental - Oroquieta City
QUITORIANO, Carol Jo-Deng I.	Cagayan
SALAS, Krish Ranjit R.	Caloocan City
TAN, Bernadette P.	Manila

== 2006 Awardees ==
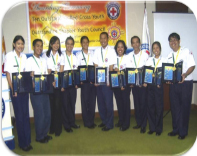
Ten Outstanding Red Cross Youth 2006

Awardee	Chapter
BONGAYAL, Ira Mario	Davao City
GABUNALES, Maeflor Pilar P.	Cotabato
GARCIA, Lyn V.	Laguna
JOPIA, Ryan Jay B.	Pangasinan - Dagupan City-San Carlos City
LLERA, Cherry Bee Q.	Negros Occidental - Bacolod City
NORA, Lulubelle M.	Rizal
PAMPLONA, Dan Dexter M.	South Cotabato
TORDA, Jehan D.S.	Valenzuela City
VARGAS, Francisco D.	Manila
VILLANUEVA, Chester V.	La Union - San Fernando City

== 2007 Awardees ==
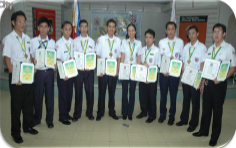
Ten Outstanding Red Cross Youth 2007

Awardee	Chapter
ALIH, Aibenhar	Sulu
ALINCASTRE, Dexter Lui-g	Negros Occidental - Bacolod City
JIMENO, Ace Lester	La Union - San Fernando City
MARANDANG, Adeah	Cotabato
MATILLANO, Francisco Jr.	Iloilo
MAZO, Mario Jay	Manila
NATIVIDAD, Noel	Laguna
PORQUIA, Lean Redino	Iloilo
SECRETARIA, Eloiza Miraflor	Davao City
TUMONONG, Kevin Lyzander	Negros Occidental - Bacolod City

== 2009 Awardees ==
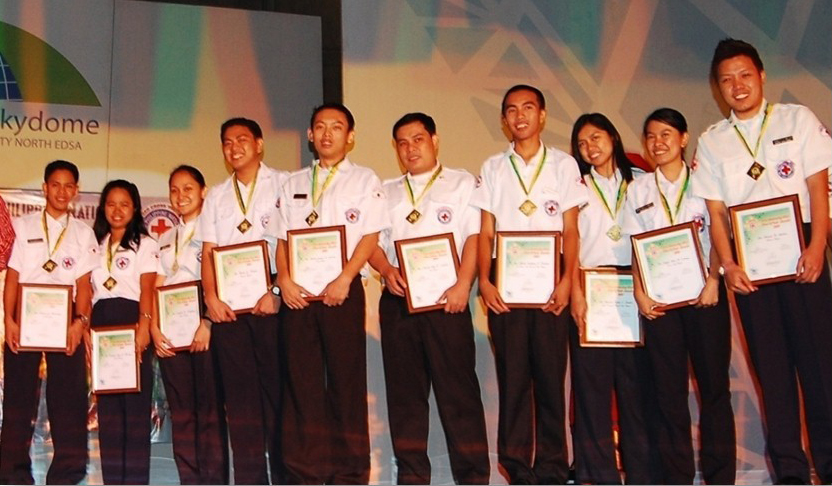
Ten Outstanding Red Cross Youth 2009

The awarding was held at the Sky Dome, SM North EDSA, Quezon City.

Awardee	Chapter
BORROMEO, Joelen	Iloilo
CABAYLO, Angel Mae N.	Davao City
CASTILLO, Chlark Kirby D.	Rizal
DELEÑA, Mark Anthony I.	La Union - San Fernando City
DIMEN, Bryan K.	Manila
FERRER, Krystel Joy A.	Isabela
GOTIDOC, Mark Joseph P.	Tarlac
INGKING, Camille D.	Bohol
MOLINA, Nonisto B.	Bulacan
PERIDO, Marisal Belle C.	Negros Occidental - Bacolod City

== 2010 Awardees ==
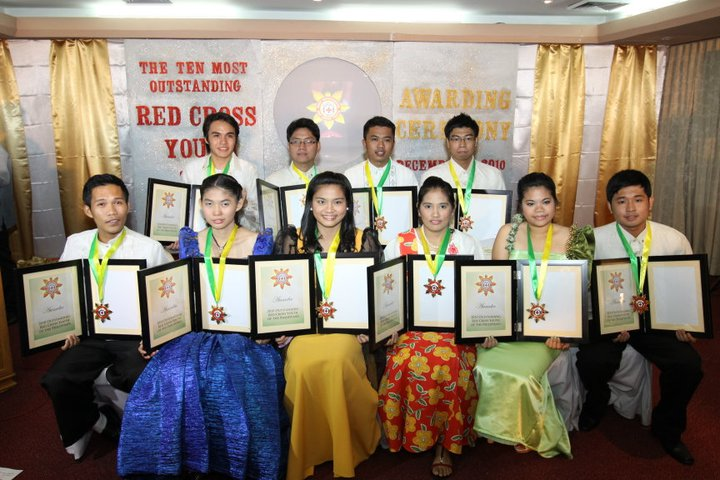
Ten Outstanding Red Cross Youth 2010 (L-R) Top: Peter Dampor of Bohol, Van Cristian Lo, Manila; Joe Jurado, Misamis Oriental-Cagayan de Oro City; Jerison Macrohon, Rizal; Bottom: Randy Mendoza, Pangasinan-Dagupan City; Janice Tabano, Valenzuela City; Elcy Debildos, Davao City; Irish Alhambra, Olongapo City; Francia Cardinez, La Union-San Fernando City; and Michael San Juan, Camarines Sur.

The awarding was held on December 18, 2010 at Bayview Park Hotel, Roxas Boulevard, City of Manila.

Awardee	Chapter
ALHAMBRA, Irish Rose G.	Olongapo City
CARDINEZ, Francia Mae A.	La Union - San Fernando City
DAMPOR, Peter Jorge I.	Bohol
DEBILDOS, Elcy Kieth L.	Davao City
JURADO, Joe Remil B.	Misamis Oriental - Cagayan de Oro City
LO, Van Christian S.	Manila
MACROHON, Julio Jerison E.	Rizal
MENDOZA, Randy A.	Pangasinan - Dagupan City-San Carlos City
SAN JUAN, Michael B.	Camarines Sur
TABANO, Janice B.	Valenzuela City

== 2022 Awardees ==
The formal awarding ceremony for the five selected youth leaders of TORCY 2022 was held on April 17, 2022, at The Manila Hotel in Manila, Philippines. This batch was notable for having an all-women roster of awardees, a first in the recognition's history. The announcement also coincided with Women's Month in March 2022.

Awardee	Chapter
OROCIO, Lenice Joy	Capiz
BARING, Camille	Rizal
MADRILEJOS, Nicole	Negros Occidental-Bacolod City
DAZO, Ruby Joy	Iloilo
IGNAS, Stephanie Lorraine	Davao City

Https://www.facebook.com/share/p/1DQjsQbBwj/
𝐓𝐇𝐄 𝐎𝐔𝐓𝐒𝐓𝐀𝐍𝐃𝐈𝐍𝐆 𝐑𝐄𝐃 𝐂𝐑𝐎𝐒𝐒 𝐘𝐎𝐔𝐓𝐇 𝐎𝐅 𝐓𝐇𝐄 𝐏𝐇𝐈𝐋𝐈𝐏𝐏𝐈𝐍𝐄𝐒 𝟐𝟎𝟐𝟐

These outstanding youth have gone above and beyond in their efforts to serve others and make a positive impact in their communities. Through their work and dedication, they have shown that young people can be powerful agents of change, and that their contributions are essential to building more resilient and compassionate communities.

Congratulations to the newest batch of awardees of The Outstanding Red Cross Youth of the Philippines. May you serve as an inspiration to the fellow youth of not just your chapter, but to the whole Red Cross Youth Philippines. See you at the awarding ceremony on April 17 at the Manila Hotel, Manila City.
