= Red Cross Youth (Philippines) =

Service of the Red Cross

Red Cross Youth (RCY)
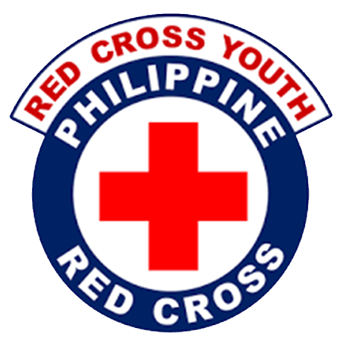
- Abbreviation: RCY
- Formation: December 4, 1917
- Type: Humanitarian Organization
- Purpose: Youth Volunteering Program
- Headquarters: Mandaluyong, Philippines
- Location: Philippine Red Cross National Headquarters, 37 EDSA cor. Boni Avenue, Mandaluyong, Philippines
- NYC President: Gov. Jay-Ar B. Gallos
- Affiliations: Philippine Red Cross
- Website: http://redcross.org.ph/what-we-do/red-cross-youth

The Red Cross Youth is one of the six major services of the Philippine Red Cross. Its mission is to educate and empower the children and youth in the spirit of Red Cross through constructive training and effective leadership, and provide opportunities for directing and harnessing their energy and idealism into worthwhile humanitarian activities.

== History of Red Cross Youth in the Philippines ==
When the Philippine Branch became a Chapter of the American Red Cross on December 4, 1917, it included the Junior Red Cross (JRC) among its activities. The director of education who was elected chairman of the JRC, directed the work of 6,000 children in JRC in the schools of Manila. JRC activities included the sewing of comfort articles and making surgical dressings for soldiers at war and planting vegetables in school gardens.

From 1922 until the outbreak of World War II in 1941, the JRC dental service became the major program with school children contributing 30 centavos each as their annual membership fee and in return they received an American JRC pin. By 1941, there were 184 dental clinics all over the country. A total of 898,333 children were inspected, 495,086 of which had defective teeth and 108,035 given treatment.

In October 1946, the JRC dental service was formally turned over to the government. From then on, it has become an integral part of child health in the Philippines.

After the liberation, the first JRC enrollment campaign under the new Philippine Republic was conducted in October 1946. Enrollment of elementary school children in the JRC was on a group basis. Schools join by class or section with a membership fee of PHP2.00 per class.

In 1948, the Philippine Junior Red Cross Magazine was published with Mrs. Loreto Paras-Sulit as editor and at the same time director of the Junior Red Cross. Activities carried out in schools were along the lines of health, service, and international friendship. The decade of 1961–1970 recorded an increase in the JRC enrollment from 3 to 4 million members from 12,000 public and private elementary and secondary schools.

The adoption of the program for college students on January 28, 1969, solved the problem of young people who would want to continue serving through the Red Cross after graduation from high school. It aimed at developing the spirit of humanitarianism and social service through active and direct involvement in Red Cross activities.

Another new important program which was approved by the board to include not only school children but also young people both in and out of school until 25 years of age. The change in name of the program from Junior Red Cross (JRC) to Red Cross Youth (RCY) was approved by the board on March 31, 1970.

From December 28 to 30, 1974, the 1st National Red Cross Youth Congress was held at the Hall of Mercy of the PNRC Manila Chapter Building with the Theme: "Voluntarism: A Force in Nation Building." The Congress elected Mr. Ruben C. Angeles of Zamboanga City as the 1st National Red Cross Youth Council President. It was not until November 1998 that the NYC President was seated as a member of the board of governors, the highest decision-making body of the Philippine National Red Cross, having then NYC President Crescente Abragan, representing the Red Cross Youth in the board. Soon after, the board approved having elected Chapter Youth Council Presidents seated as a mandated member of the chapter board of directors, thereby representing the interest of the youth in the local level.

In February 2000, the board of governors approved the assignment of October of every year as the Red Cross Youth Month. In December 2000, the National Youth Council celebrated its 25th Founding Anniversary.

On August 12, 2003, the United Nations in the Philippines recognized the Red Cross Youth as one of the Five Outstanding Youth Organizations Awardee.

October 2003 saw the launch of the first batch of the Ten Outstanding Red Cross Youth (TORCY) and by October 2005, the first batch of the Outstanding Chapter Youth Council Award. In June 2006, PNRC spearheaded the South East Asia National Youth Leaders' Summit (SEANYLS) electing then NYC president, Gov. Carlos Benigno S. Gallardo, as its chairman.

Fast forward, August 2016 when the Philippine Red Cross's board of governors appointed Gov. Novey Robert Dolde to be the first NYC president to chair the Youth Committee of the governing board.

Through DepEd Order No. 38 Series of 2005, the department of education recognized the Red Cross Youth as a co-curricular club in all schools and in 2008, a memorandum of agreement was signed with the department of education, Commission of Higher Education (CHED), Philippine Association of College and Universities (PACU), Technical Education Skills Development Authority (TESDA) and the Philippine Drug Enforcement Agency (PDEA) in strengthening the establishment of Red Cross Youth Councils in the different schools and colleges as well as updating the Drug / Substance Abuse Education (in the case of PDEA).

Most recently, through DepEd Order No. 53 Series of 2015, the department of education granted the issuance of Service Credits to all Red Cross Youth Advisers participating in Red Cross Youth activities thereby strengthening all Red Cross Youth Advisers in their participation in empowering their youth volunteers.

== Four (4) Major Objectives ==
1. Inculcation of Humanitarian Values – the organization believes that the early development of humanitarian leaders lie in the inculcation of humanitarian values among its youth members.
2. Instill the Practice of a Healthy Lifestyle – build a healthy community through youth participation and involvement in health promotion and education towards a stronger nation.
3. Enhance Youth Leadership Skills through Service Delivery – to be active in community development by leading the delivery of Red Cross services in their capacity as volunteers.
4. Advocate National / International Friendship – to promote camaraderie and unity, mutual respect and the spirit of international brotherhood amidst socio-cultural diversity.

== The Red Cross Youth Pledge ==
As a Youth Member of the premier humanitarian organization, I pledge to alleviate human suffering, protect life and dignity, to be a responsible citizen of the Republic of the Philippines, to conform with the objectives and policies of the Philippine Red Cross, its seven fundamental principles: Humanity, Impartiality, Neutrality, Independence, Voluntary Service, Unity and Universality and to be at all times be in the service for the suffering humanity.

== Membership ==
- Red Cross Youth Member – any youth who has paid the annual membership dues for the Red Cross Youth.
- Red Cross Youth Volunteer – a member of the Red Cross Youth who has undergone basic orientation about the Red Cross Youth and the Red Cross in general.

== Categories of Membership ==
=== Junior Red Cross (JRC) ===
In other organizations, one maybe considered a member without paying any fee. In the Red Cross, the PRC considers as members those who contribute to the fund campaign and those who donate blood but their contributions are not considered as membership fee.

However, in the PRC Youth Program, one becomes a member after paying the membership fee (at present, general membership fee is P50.00). A JRC member may become a volunteer at the same time but a volunteer can not become a member unless he/she pays his membership fee.

The youth arm of the Philippine Red Cross has always been registered under a class enrollment concept. School authorities assist the Red Cross in the collection of membership fee in school, but proper coordination and series of meetings with DepEd officials, teachers and even the parents are to be done in order to the local Red Cross chapters to have opportunities to explain the components of the membership fee and where this goes.

Junior Red Cross members are elementary students whose age ranges from 7 to 12 years old. They are formed into school council with the active JRC Adviser as their guide and adult leader who facilitates and assist the council in recruiting, organizing and training JRC members in the school or institution.

=== Senior Red Cross Youth (SRCY) ===
Originally, the Red Cross Youth High School belongs to the JRC category of the Red Cross Youth Program. There was no clear delineation of responsibilities nor with the activities. The program of the high school students were the same as that of the elementary students.

But then, this set-up was observed to cause a problem. The high school students are too old for program being offered to the elementary students and yet they are young for the activities being done by the college students. And so, the need to reclassify the high school students and create activities that suits their age level was identified and addressed by the PRC.

In January 1995, the board of governors approved the separation of the high school students from the JRC category. With that, they would no longer be called JRC members but instead Senior Red Cross Youth, a step higher than the JRC and a step lower than the College RCYs whose age ranges from 13 to 16 years old.

=== Senior Plus Red Cross Youth (SPRCY) ===
Originally, SPRCY Red Cross Youth was supposed to belong on College Red Cross Youth but due to the implementation of the K-12 program on both private and public schools, the Philippine Red Cross created another program which is the Senior Plus Red Cross Youth. The Red Cross Program for senior high school, whose age ranges from 16 to 18 years old. There was no clear delineation of responsibilities nor with the activities. The program of the senior high school students were the same as that of the junior high school students.

=== College Red Cross Youth (CRCY) ===
The Red Cross Program for college students, whose age ranges from 18 to 25 years old, was approved by the board on January 28, 1969. Its primary aim is to develop among the students the spirit of humanitarianism and social service through active and direct involvement in Red Cross activities.

According to information received by the Youth Bureau of the International Federation of Red Cross and Red Crescent Societies, the Red Cross program has grown much wider partly because new trends in educational methods favored participation of young people in action (i.e. learning through action) and recently also in planning and decision making and because young Red Cross members have gradually become more than just recipients of direct educational programs.

The Youth have identified themselves more and more with the ideas of the Red Cross, through learning about its principles and tasks. In view of this, they have become Red Cross volunteers of the same value as the adult members, for they come to the Red Cross not only to learn to get, but also to actively participate in the life of the Red Cross, to render services where needed.

But this was changed in 2018, the College Red Cross Youth shall be age range from 18 to 25 years old.

=== Community Red Cross Youth (CommRCY) ===
Red Cross offers services not only to those in schools but also to the young professionals and community based youth. The program for Community Red Cross Youth was approved by the board on July 20, 1969. A Leadership Training Course was adopted and patterned after the LEAD (Leadership, Education, Ability, and Development) program of San Pablo City. The aim is to train the youth to serve themselves and their families through the Red Cross and use their time by learning a trade for their livelihood.

This particular category of the youth program was known before as the Out-of-School Red Cross Youth (OS-RCY). However, in a board meeting held on October 5, 1993, it was approved that there shall be a change in nomenclature: from Out-of-School to Community Red Cross Youth, whose age ranges from 7 to 30 years old.

=== Other Categories (by rank, specialization, or title) ===
- National Youth Council Red Cross Youth Volunteers who are elected as coordinators of their respective areas during the biennial national gathering (National Youth Congress).
- Chapter Youth Council – Red Cross Youth Volunteers who are elected as coordinators of the school councils within their respective chapter's areas of jurisdiction.
- School/Community RCY Council – Red Cross Youth Volunteers who are elected as officers of their respective school or community Red Cross Youth Councils.
- National Trainer – Red Cross Youth Volunteers who has undergone and successfully completed the Red Cross Youth National Trainers Training. They are authorized by the Red Cross Youth to conduct or facilitate the different Red Cross Youth Training Courses.
- Leadership Trainer – Red Cross Youth Volunteers who has undergone and successfully completed a Red Cross Youth Trainers Training on Leadership. They are authorized by the Red Cross Youth to conduct or facilitate the different Red Cross Youth Leadership Training Courses.
- HAPE Educator – Red Cross Youth Volunteers who has undergone and successfully completed an Educators Course for HIV/AIDS Prevention and Education. They are authorized by the Red Cross Youth to conduct a dissemination session on HIV/AIDS Prevention and Education (HAPE).
- SAPE Educator – Red Cross Youth Volunteers who has undergone and successfully completed an Educators Course for Substance Abuse Prevention and Education. They are authorized by the Red Cross Youth to conduct a dissemination session on Substance Abuse Prevention and Education (SAPE).
- RCY IHL Disseminator – Red Cross Youth Volunteers who has undergone and successfully completed the Training of Disseminators for IHL. They are authorized by the Red Cross Youth and the IHL Office to conduct a dissemination session on IHL in schools.
- RCY DRT Trainer – Red Cross Youth Volunteers who has undergone and successfully completed a DRT Trainers Course. They are authorized by the Red Cross Youth and the Disaster Management Services to conduct Disaster Management Trainings for the youth.
- RCY Debriefer – Red Cross Youth Volunteers who has undergone and successfully completed a Critical Incidence Stress Debriefers Course. They are authorized by the Red Cross Youth and the Social Services to conduct Critical Incidence Stress Debriefing for the youth. (CISD)

== RCY Uniforms ==
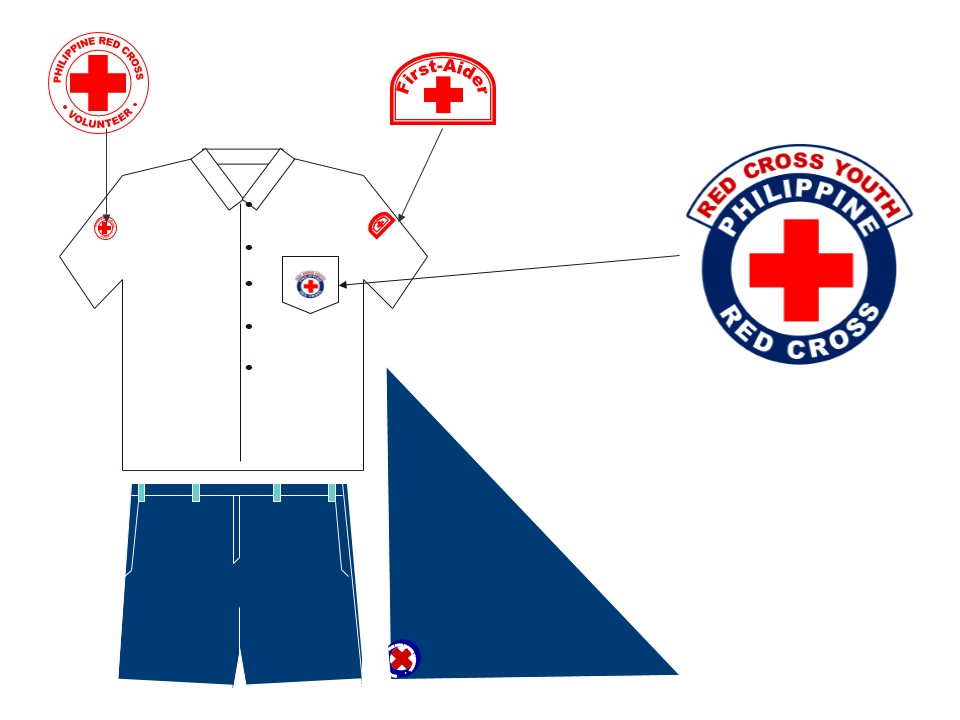
Junior Red Cross Type A Uniform

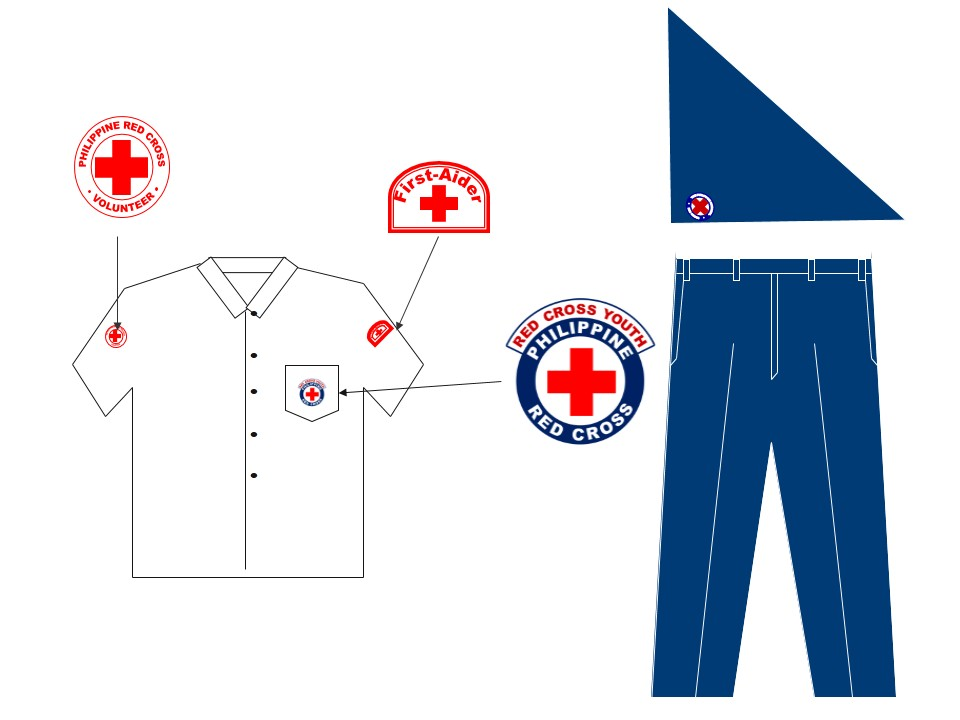
Senior Red Cross Youth Type A Uniform

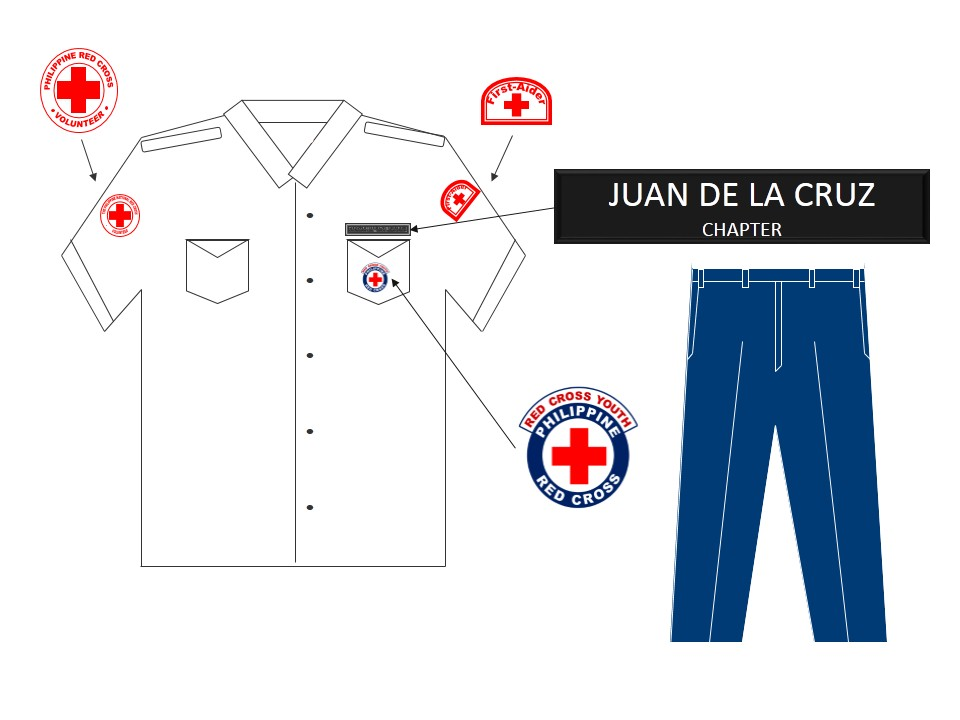
College and Community Red Cross Youth Type A Uniform

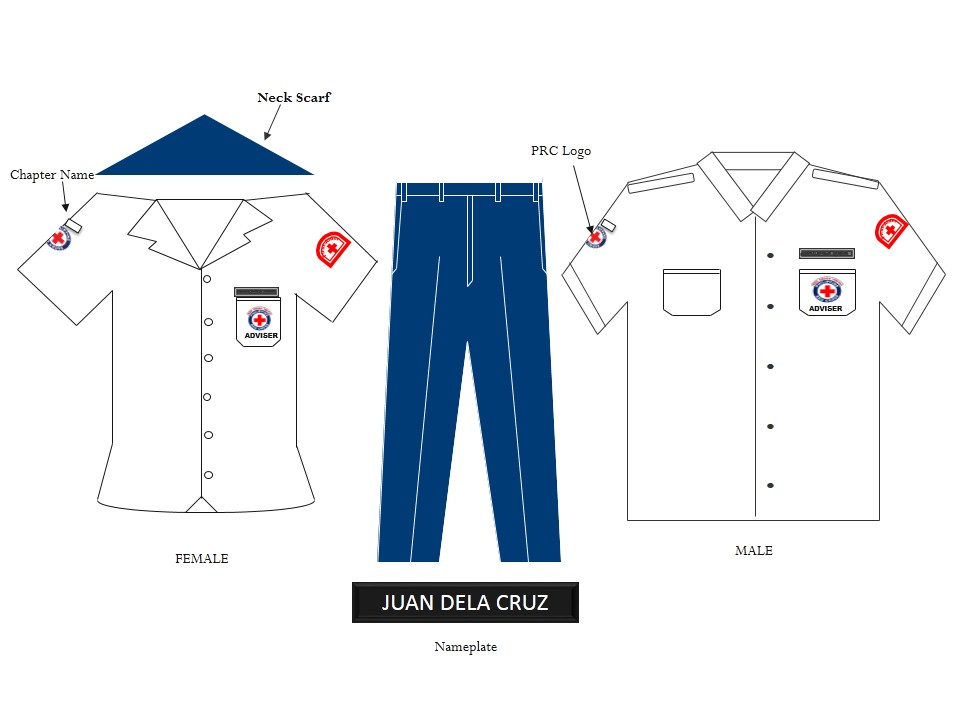
Adviser's Type A Uniform

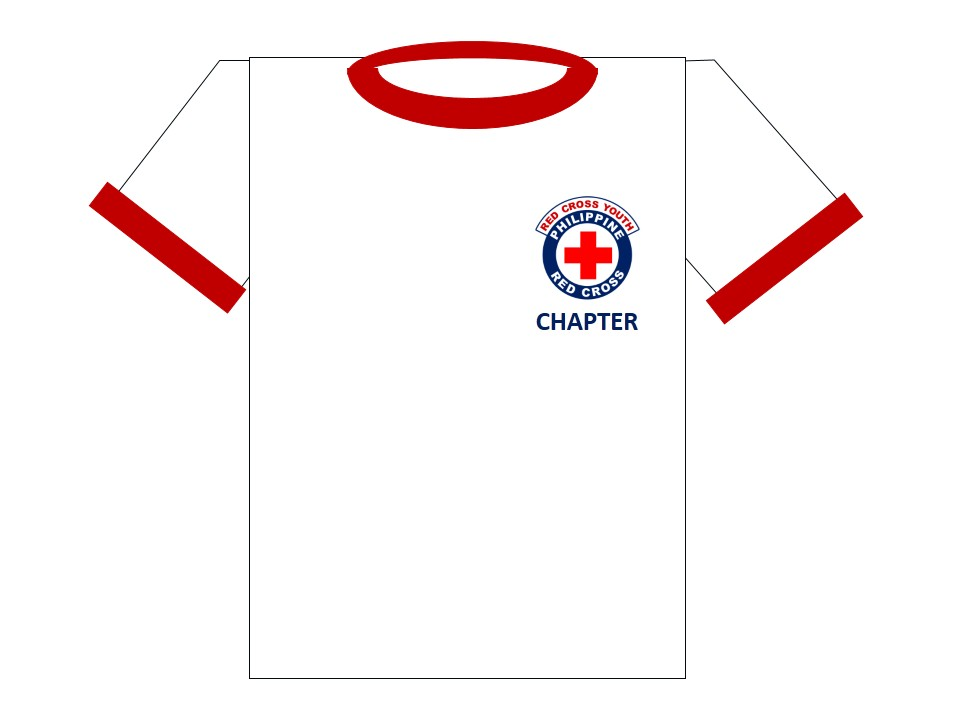
Type B Uniform

== Programs & Services ==
=== Annual International Youth Friendship ===
Exchange Project is a youth cooperation project between the Japanese JRC/RCY Division and the Philippine Red Cross Youth – Red Cross Youth Department involving selection of vulnerable public elementary schools in the Philippines and distribution by the Japanese RCY members of school supplies to pupils and students, and sports equipment to select schools. The school distribution is the entry point for a more comprehensive program of youth interaction and international exchange of correspondence between the two societies, with intensified youth membership. The program also involves the actual exchange of RCY members between Japan and the Philippines through the annual "Mt. Fuji International Youth Exchange" held every November.

=== Junior First Aiders' Program ===
An institutionalized program with an exclusive set of training activities for Junior Red Cross members (elementary students) aims to develop or enhance the potentials of Junior Red Cross Youth members to become good leaders and train them on how to administer Basic First Aid.

The JFAP will also give them opportunity to practice their learned knowledge and skills in their school clinics through coordination of possible duty schedules with the school administration.

=== National RCY Advisers' League Conference ===
A national biennial gathering of active and registered Chapter Youth Council Advisers from the Philippine Red Cross Chapters nationwide, where they share experiences and best practices among themselves and undertake, plan out strategies and methodologies to further improve the structure and performance of the Red Cross Youth Councils in the schools and in the communities.

=== National Youth Council Meeting ===
The Red Cross Youth Department, through the manager, is responsible in facilitating the regular and executive council meeting of the National Youth Council Officers. They usually meet every quarter to discuss and plan for relevant and productive National RCY activities.

=== National Youth Congress ===
The highest deliberative body of the Red Cross Youth, which is convened biennially with qualified chapter RCY officers and members (15–25 years old) in attendance from all over the country in order to discuss relevant strategies and plans to continually intensify quality leadership among RCY and develop youth programs for the future. The congress, which is highly participatory, is designed to draw the youth's interest in bringing out the best in them. The Congress venue is selected alternately within Luzon, Visayas and Mindanao islands.

==== National Youth Congress Venues ====
Congress	Year	Venue	Theme
I	1974	Manila	"Volunteerism: A Force In Nation-Building."
II	1976	Laguna	"Red Cross Youth: Its Response to the Challenges of Community Development."
III	1978	Bulacan	"Red Cross Youth and the Needs of the Filipino Child Within the Decade."
IV	1981	Bulacan	"Red Cross Youth and World Peace"
V	1984	Baguio City	"Participation, Development, Peace"
VI	1986–1987	Not Specified	Not Specified
VII	1989	Bulacan	Not Specified
VIII	1992	Aklan	Not Specified
IX	1994	Davao	Not Specified
X	1997	Baguio	"Enhancing the Role of Red Cross Youth in the Next Millenium."
XI	1999	Iloilo	Not Specified
XII	2000	Laguna	Not Specified
XIII	2002	Butuan City	Not Specified
XIV	2005	Bacolod	Not Specified
XV	2007	La Union	"3D on 33: Discipline, Dedication and Development."
XVI	2009	Manila	"Our World. YOUth Move."
XVII	2011	Bukidnon	"iACT: Assert. Care. Transform."
XVIII	2013	Lapu-Lapu City	"Stronger Red Cross Youth for Stronger Philippine Red Cross."
XIX	2015	Mandaluyong	"Re-living our History. Creating our Legacy. Yielding Holistic Advocates for Humanity."
XX	2017	Mandaluyong	"Red Cross Youth: A Century as Agents of Change Motivated by Passion, Reshaping the Nation."
XXI	2021	Virtual	"Resonating Narratives: Voice. Passion. Stories."

=== Red Cross Youth Month ===
A special time celebrated yearly during the month of October to make the public more aware of the Red Cross Youth activities at the National Headquarters and in the chapters. This month-long celebration is mainly designed to intensify promotion of the RCY programs though the tri-media with the active participation of the Red Cross Youth Star Volunteers and motivate more and more young people to join the Red Cross Youth organization. As designated also on the Ten Most Outstanding Red Cross Youth members from the chapters who excel in leadership and other fields of humanitarian services.

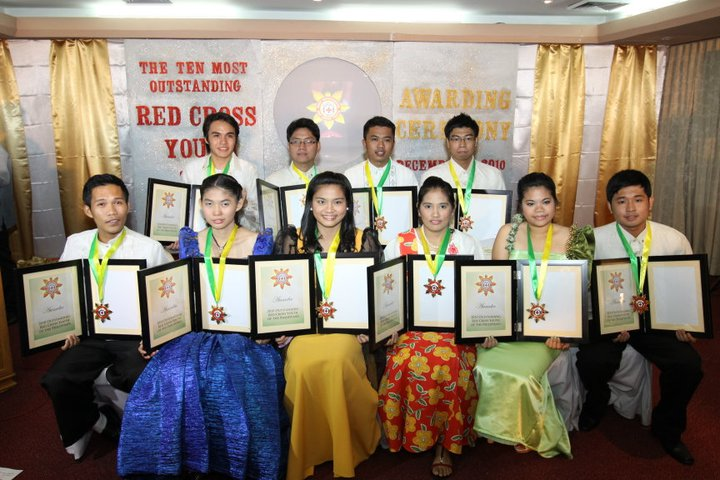
Ten Outstanding Red Cross Youth 2010 (L-R) Top: Peter Dampor of Bohol, Van Cristian Lo, Manila; Joe Jurado, Misamis Oriental-Cagayan de Oro City; Jerison Macrohon, Rizal; Bottom: Randy Mendoza, Pangasinan-Dagupan City; Janice Tabano, Valenzuela City; Elcy Debildos, Davao City; Irish Alhambra, Olongapo City; Francia Cardinez, La Union-San Fernando City; and Michael San Juan, Camarines Sur.

=== Red Cross Youth Star Volunteers ===
A special group of wholesome celebrity from the entertainment industry screened by the Youth Committee. As role models for the Red Cross Youth, these volunteers undergo same qualifying training on leadership and commit to promote and endorse the youth programs of the Red Cross in tri-media, and support the fund generation initiatives of NHQ and the chapters.

=== National Youth Camp ===
Also known as the SuperCamp Philippines, is a 5-day camping for Junior and Senior Red Cross Youth members (9 to 16 years old) to enjoy the wonders of nature and enrichment of teamwork experience through wholesome outdoor games and other environment-friendly competitions, leadership enhancement indoor sessions, and opinion-sharing over vital youth issues.

Supercamp	Year	Venue
I	1995	Mt. Makiling, Los Baños, Laguna
II	1999	Camp Gen. Macario Peralta Jr., Jamindan, Capiz
III	2004	Camp Jose Atilano, Pasonanca, Zamboanga City
IV	2008	Camp General Mateo Capinpin, Sampaloc, Tanay, Rizal
V	2016	Mactan Benito Ebuen Air Base Elementary School, Lapu-Lapu City, Cebu

=== Ten Outstanding Red Cross Youth ===
An annual search for outstanding Red Cross Youth volunteers who have rendered unselfish service of excellence to the Philippine Red Cross. It aims to recognize the volunteers for their invaluable support and contributions to the PRC through the Red Cross Youth Programs.

Pledge 25 Logo

=== Most Outstanding Chapter Youth Council ===
A national recognition on how a Chapter Youth Council can make a difference by way of providing service to, advocating for, with the vulnerable people in the communities. The general criteria of this award are: Impact of the different projects to the community, participation of the youth/youth mobilization, innovativeness/creativity or ability to use technology, promotion of the 6 major services of the Philippine Red Cross, Principles of Red Cross and of the Red Cross Youth Objectives.

=== Youth Instructors' Training Course ===
A crucial youth activity participated in by RCY members (17–25 years old) who wish to become Youth Instructors for Leadership and are certified to capably conduct RCY trainings such as Youth Volunteer Orientation Course, Leadership Formation Course, Basic Leadership Training, HIV/AIDS Prevention Education, Substance Abuse Prevention Education, Pledge 25 and International Humanitarian Law – Children Involved in Arm Conflict.

=== Pledge 25 ===
A project of the Philippine Red Cross – Red Cross Youth Department (RCY) in support of the drive on voluntary blood donation. It is a group of young blood givers where members, after being motivated to become voluntary blood donors, will pledge to regularly donate blood 3 to 4 times a year starting the age of 18 until they reach 25 years old. After this period, they will be joining other blood donors' group as the Blood Galloners' Club of the National Blood Services (NBS) for their regular and continuous blood donation.

== Trainings ==
=== Non-Instructors Courses ===
==== Youth Volunteer Formation Course (YVFC) ====
- Youth Volunteers' Orientation Module – It seeks to orient and give proper information on its participants about the Red Cross Movement, its principles, emblem and services. Likewise, it also endeavors to draw out values on volunteerism from the participant through workshops and other activities.
- Values Formation Course – It endeavors to give its participants a venue for self-awareness, re-assessments of their values and beliefs, and formation of leadership ideas suited for the organization.
- Team Development – It undertakes synthesis of the first two training sessions and tackles, discusses and conducts workshops on simple leadership skills and concepts such as development and organization, team building and the concept of leadership.

==== HIV/AIDS Prevention Education (HAPE) ====
A basic dissemination course aimed to provide proper education on the prevention of HIV and AIDS.

==== Substance Abuse Prevention Education (SAPE) ====
Formerly Drug Abuse Prevention Education (DAPE), a basic dissemination course aimed to provide proper education on the prevention of substance abuse.

==== Pledge 25 Donor Orientation ====
This half-day orientation aims to provide basic information about Pledge 25 and Voluntary Blood Donation of the Philippine Red Cross (PRC) which focus on the importance of blood donation and the role of youth blood donors. Voluntary blood donation needs youth participation and this orientation will be a valuable source of information for potential blood donors especially for the young.

=== Instructors Courses ===
- Youth Instructor's Training
- HAPE Educators Course
- SAPE Educators Course
- Leadership Development Program
- Pledge 25 Donor Recruiter
