= National Youth Council (Philippines) =

The aim of the National Youth Council (NYC) is to work with the Red Cross Youth Department to develop among the youth the spirit of humanitarianism and social service by giving them opportunities to participate in relevant Red Cross activities within the framework of the organization. The NYC is composed of nine (9) youth leaders, representing nine (9) different regional areas, elected during the National Youth Congress held every two years.

== Objectives ==
- Work with the PRC Management in formulation of policies and programs concerning the youth and the National Society
- To serve as a focal point of coordination of the Chapter Youth Councils (CYC)
- To assist and advise the CYC in the development and promotion of RCY Programs

== NYC Areas of Responsibilities ==
Area I (Northern Luzon)	Area II (Central Luzon)	Area III (Southern Luzon)
1. Abra; 2. Apayao; 3. Baguio City; 4. Batanes; 5. Benguet; 6. Cagayan; 7. Ifugao; 8. Ilocos Norte-Laoag City; 9. Ilocos Sur; 10. Isabela; 11. Kalinga; 12. La Union-San Fernando City; 13. Mountain Province; 14. Nueva Viscaya; 15. Quirino; 16. Santiago City	1. Alaminos City-Western Pangasinan; 2. Aurora; 3. Bataan; 4. Bulacan; 5. Nueva Ecija; 6. Olongapo City; 7. Pampanga-Angeles City; 8. Pangasinan-Dagupan-San Carlos City; 9. Tarlac; 10. Zambales	1. Albay-Legazpi City; 2. Batangas; 3. Camarines Norte; 4. Camarines Sur; 5. Catanduanes; 6. Marinduque; 7. Masbate; 8. Mindoro Occidental; 9. Mindoro Oriental; 10. Quezon-Lucena City; 11. Romblon; 12. Sorsogon
Area IV (Greater Manila Area)	Area V (Western Visayas)	Area VI (East and Central Visayas)
1. Caloocan City; 2. Cavite; 3. Laguna; 4. Las Piñas City; 5. Malabon; 6. Manila; 7. Marikina; 8. Navotas; 9. Palawan; 10. Pasay; 11. Quezon City; 12. Rizal; 13. San Pablo City; 14. Valenzuela City	1. Aklan; 2. Antique; 3. Boracay-Malay; 4. Capiz; 5. Guimaras; 6. Iloilo; 7. Negros Occidental-Bacolod City; 8. Negros Oriental; 9. Siquijor	1. Bohol; 2. Cebu; 3. Eastern Samar; 4. Hilongos; 5. Lapu-Lapu City-Cordova; 6. Leyte; 7. Northern Samar; 8. Ormoc City; 9. Southern Leyte; 10. Western Samar
Area VII (Western Mindanao)	Area VIII (Northern Mindanao)	Area IX (Southern Mindanao)
1. Basilan; 2. Misamis Occidental-Oroqueta City; 3. Ozamis City; 4. Sulu; 5. Tangub; 6. Tawi-Tawi; 7. Zamboanga City; 8. Zamboanga del Norte; 9. Zamboanga del Sur - Pagadian City; 10. Zamboanga Sibugay	1. Agusan del Norte - Butuan City; 2. Bukidnon; 3. Camiguin; 4. Gingoog City; 5. Iligan City; 6. Lanao del Norte; 7. Lanao del Sur; 8. Misamis Oriental-Cagayan de Oro City; 9. Surigao del Norte	1. Agusan del Sur; 2. Compostela Valley; 3. Cotabato; 4. Davao City; 5. Davao del Sur; 6. Davao Oriental; 7. Davao del Norte-Tagum City; 8. General Santos City-Sarangani; 9. North Cotabato; 10. South Cotabato; 11. Sultan Kudarat; 12. Surigao del Sur

== National Youth Council Presidents ==
Name	Chapter	Area	Years served
Ruben Angeles†	Zamboanga City	Area 7	1975-1978
Manuel Turingan	Manila	Area 4	1979-1981
Ma. Herminia Acantalicio	Camarines Sur	Area 3	1982-1983
Christopher Montano	Iloilo City	Area 5	1985-1987
Mario Aguja	Quezon City	Area 4	1988-1990
Yolanda Manliguez	Davao Oriental	Area 9	1991-1992
Benedicto B. Bulaclac, Jr.	Cotabato City	Area 9	1992-1994
Roderick Cruz	Quezon City	Area 4	1994-1997
Crescente Abragan	Iligan City	Area 8	1997-1998
Ruby Christ Gelvero	Iloilo City	Area 5	1998-1999
Evanessa Pasamba	Manila	Area 4	1999-2000
Rico Bentulan	Cebu	Area 6	2001-2003
Solaiman Andig, Jr.	Manila	Area 4	2003-2005
Carlos Benigno Gallardo	La Union	Area 1	2005-2007
Lyn Garcia	Laguna	Area 4	2007-2009
Chester Villanueva	La Union	Area 1	2009-2011
Jan Ehlvest Bo	Manila	Area 4	2011-2012
Allan Claveria	Pangasinan	Area 2	2012-2013
Reynard Leo Francisco	Rizal	Area 4	2013-2014
Elcy Kieth Debildos	Davao City	Area 9	2015
Novey Robert Dolde	Agusan del Norte-Butuan City	Area 8	2015-2017
Mark Brayn Yaung	Negros Occidental-Bacolod City	Area 5	2017–2021
Jay-Ar Gallos	Rizal	Area 4	2021-present

=== National Youth Congress ===
Congress	Year	Venue	Theme
I	1974	Manila	"Volunteerism: A Force In Nation-Building."
II	1976	Laguna	"Red Cross Youth: Its Response to the Challenges of Community Development."
III	1978	Bulacan	"Red Cross Youth and the Needs of the Filipino Child Within the Decade."
IV	1981	Bulacan	"Red Cross Youth and World Peace"
V	1984	Baguio City	"Participation, Development, Peace"
VI	1986/1987	Not Specified	Not Specified
VII	1989	Bulacan	Not Specified
VIII	1992	Aklan	Not Specified
IX	1994	Davao	Not Specified
X	1997	Baguio	"Enhancing the Role of Red Cross Youth in the Next Millenium."
XI	1999	Iloilo	Not Specified
XII	2000	Laguna	Not Specified
XIII	2002	Butuan City	Not Specified
XIV	2005	Bacolod	Not Specified
XV	2007	La Union	"3D on 33: Discipline, Dedication and Development."
XVI	2009	Manila	"Our World. YOUth Move."
XVII	2011	Bukidnon	"iACT: Assert. Care. Transform."
XVIII	2013	Lapu-Lapu City	"Stronger Red Cross Youth for Stronger Philippine Red Cross."
XIX	2015	Mandaluyong	"Re-living our History. Creating our Legacy. Yielding Holistic Advocates for Humanity."
XX	2017	Mandaluyong	"Red Cross Youth: A Century as Agents of Change Motivated by Passion, Reshaping the Nation."
XXI	2021	Virtual/Online	"Resonating Narratives: Voice. Passion. Stories."

== National Youth Council Officers ==
=== 1975-1976 ===
Name	Chapter	Position
Ruben Angeles†	Zamboanga City	President
Gerardo Jacinto	Caloocan City	Vice President
Rosanna Leonor	Manila	Secretary
Maria Rose Quitoriano	Ilocos Sur	Assistant Secretary
Yohlee Roldan	Camarines Norte	Treasurer
Enrique Garcia	Manila	Assistant Treasurer
Joseph Latip	Lanao Del Norte	Auditor
Johnny Oyos	Pasay	P.R.O.
Adelina Abanes	Camarines Norte	Regional Director
Yahya Centi	Zamboanga City	Regional Director
Gonzalo Gesta	Surigao Del Norte	Regional Director
Teodoro Lagare, Jr.	Negros Oriental	Regional Director
Alex Marasigan	Manila	Regional Director
Naida Plano	Ilocos Norte	Regional Director
James Y. Sian	Capiz	Regional Director

=== 1977-1978 ===
Name	Chapter	Position
Ruben Angeles†	Zamboanga City	President
Allan Ladrido	Iloilo City	Vice President
Carmencita Rosales	Camarines Sur	Secretary
Cynthia Calderon	Caloocan City	Assistant Secretary
Marcelino Lopez, Jr.	Zamboanga City	Treasurer
Ma. Gladys Asuncion	Albay	Assistant Treasurer
Mignonette Agustino	Cavite City	Regional Director
Marilyn Chu	Leyte	Regional Director
Juanito Diel	Davao City	Regional Director
Helen Grace Salantandre	Lanao Del Norte	Regional Director
Ligaya Simbulan	Pampanga	Regional Director

=== 1979-1981 ===
Name	Chapter	Position
Manuel Turingan	Manila	President
Pilarito Montebon	Zamboanga City	Vice President
Rosabella Lorena-Broce	Zamboanga del Norte	Secretary
Emerita Dela Cruz	Sorsogon	Treasurer
Roy Juntado	Iloilo City	Auditor
Nellie Reyes	Camarines Sur	P.R.O.
Victoria Aide	Manila	
Ma. Cristina Garcia	Iloilo City	
Melchor Caspillan	Pangasinan	
Orlando Salatrandre	Lanao del Norte	

=== 1982-1983 ===
Name	Chapter	Position
Ma. Herminia Acantalicio	Camarines Sur	President
Arturo L. Faro	Iloilo City	Vice President
Josefina Cleofas	Caloocan City	Secretary
Rosemarie Rosales	Camarines Sur	Treasurer
Benedicto Brion	Davao City	Auditor
Lorna Dupitas	South Cotabato City	P.R.O.
Gerardo Erasmo	Davao del Sur	
Domingo Lacsa	Sorsogon	
Renato Pacis	Manila	
Rofino Sun, Jr.	Negros Oriental	

=== 1985-1987 ===
Name	Chapter	Position
Christopher Montano	Iloilo City	President
Adonis Bajao	Davao del Sur	Vice President
Ignacio Barga	Davao City	Secretary
Hilary Agana	Baguio City	Treasurer
Arthur Ko	Pampanga	Auditor
Marie Jean Escalante	Sorsogon	P.R.O.
Rogelio Atardido	South Cotabato	
Eduardo Chua	Rizal	
Glerhjim Puracan	Negros Oriental	
Emmeline Valencia	Camarines Sur	

=== 1988-1990 ===
Name	Chapter	Position
Mario Aguja	Quezon City	President
Allan Cajucom	Zamboanga City	Vice President
Yolanda Manliguez	Davao Oriental	Secretary
Ferdinand Amulet Parker	Davao del Sur	Treasurer
Samson Pedragosa	Laguna	Auditor
Ester Sarisanto	Baguio City	P.R.O.
Pondano Gandula	Caloocan City	
Luisito Gelmo	South Cotabato	
Mario Lazarito†	Iloilo City	
Tito Sarion	Camarines Norte	

=== 1990-1992 ===
Name	Chapter	Position
Yolanda Manliguez	Davao Oriental	President
Luisito Gelmo	South Cotabato	Vice President
Laarni Mae Reveche	Davao Oriental	Secretary
Ferdinand Amulet Parker	Davao del Sur	Treasurer
Ma. Eloisa Ponce	Zamboanga City	Auditor
Mario Ferdinand Diaz	Davao City	P.R.O.
Graciela Castillo	Quezon City	
Mario Lazarito†	Iloilo City	
Tito Sarion	Camarines Norte	
Alejandro M. Torres	General Santos City	

=== 1992-1994 ===
Name	Chapter	Position
Benedicto Bulaclac	Cotabato City	President
Roy C. Bautista	Quezon City	Vice President
Suzette Causing	Davao del Sur	Secretary
Perry P. Camba	Albay-Legazpi	Assistant Secretary
Gaudencio Cabanban	Negros Oriental	Treasurer
Nick S. Jacob	Baguio City	Assistant Treasurer
Datu Yldon Kiram	Sulu	Auditor
Fidel Angeles	Pangasinan	P.R.O.

=== 1994-1996 ===
Name	Chapter	Position
Roderick Cruz	Quezon City	President
Ma. Nelma Olam	Agusan Del Norte-Butuan City	Vice President
Alma Flor Caurel	Cagayan Valley	Secretary
Rustom Mariano	Nueva Ecija	Assistant Secretary
Gwendolyn T. Pang	Sulu	Treasurer
Jose Eugel Palonpon	Iloilo City	Assistant Treasurer
Ma. Christi N. Villaranda	Albay-Legazpi	Auditor
Jonathan de Jesus	Davao City	P.I.O.
Carl Danque	Northern Samar	Assistant P.I.O.

=== 1997-1998 ===
Name	Chapter	Position
Crescente Abragan	Iligan City	President (1st Youth Governor)
Gail Dvorack Espina	Leyte	Vice President
Philip June Apruebo	Capiz	Secretary
Aldwin Uy	Pampanga	Assistant Secretary
Lea Estrada	Masbate	Treasurer
Ariel Dayutao	Benguet	Assistant Treasurer
Gain Paul de Barras	Misamis Occidental	Auditor
Raymund Diaz	Davao City	P.I.O.
Marvin Capco	Rizal	Assistant P.I.O.

=== 1999-2000 ===
Name	Chapter	Position
Evanessa Pasamba	Manila	President
Rustom Mariano	Nueva Ecija	Vice President
Marco Abrazado	La Union	Secretary
Beverly Molina	South Cotabato	Assistant Secretary
Joseph Melecio	Butuan City	Treasurer
Jonas Kee Quilantang	Southern Leyte	Assistant Treasurer
Matt Victor Magdaong	Albay-Legazpi	Auditor
Gerry Yosores Asuncion	Zamboanga City	P.R.O.
Rita Mae Reyes	Bacolod City	Assistant P.R.O.

=== 2000-2002 ===
Name	Chapter	Position
Rico Bentulan	Cebu	President
Rustom Mariano	Nueva Ecija	Vice President
Marvin Capco	Rizal	Secretary
Rowil Dapat	Davao del Norte	Assistant Secretary
Leonilo Lagasca II	Iligan City	Treasurer
Analyn Ibno	Basilan	Assistant Treasurer
Vic Jay Gonzal	Ormoc City	Auditor
Marco Abrazado	La Union	P.R.O.
Edwin Divinagracia	Sorsogon	Assistant P.R.O.

=== 2002-2005 ===
Name	Chapter	Position
Solaiman Andig, Jr.	Manila	President
Rommel Jamero	Davao del Sur	Vice President
Willah De La Llana	Iloilo	Secretary
Milleo Melendez	Laguna	Assistant Secretary
Zubair Cabulao	Zamboanga City	Treasurer
Randy Reyes	Agusan Del Norte-Butuan City	Assistant Treasurer
Alfrey Gulla	Quirino	Auditor
Janice Domingo	Quirino	Auditor
Carlo Casillar	Leyte	P.R.O.
Richard Orlanda	Alaminos City-Western Pangasinan	Assistant P.R.O.

=== 2005-2007 ===
Name	Chapter	Position
Carlos Benigno Gallardo	La Union	President
Ramoncito Pabion	Rizal	Vice President
Vanessa Alcantar	Cagayan de Oro	Secretary
Charlie Jones Carta	General Santos City	Treasurer
Eric Ordaniel	Bacolod City	Assistant Treasurer
Aisha Juanillo	Ormoc City	Auditor
Emmanuelle Agas	Palawan	P.R.O.
Renan Celestian Ariosa	Zamboanga Sibugay	Assistant P.R.O.

=== 2007-2009 ===
Name	Chapter	Position
Lyn Garcia	Laguna	President
Michael Esguerra	Davao City	Vice President
Raymund Mario Chan	Ilocos Sur	Secretary
Ayr Altavas	Capiz	Assistant Secretary
Arjay Berja	Camarines Sur	Treasurer
Jonas Maco	Southern Leyte	Assistant Treasurer
Randy Mendoza	Pangasinan	P.R.O.
Gregorio Miguel Pallugna	Dipolog City	Assistant P.R.O.

=== 2009-2011 ===
Name	Chapter	Position
Chester Villanueva	La Union – San Fernando City	President
Ian Christian Gonzales	Misamis Oriental - Cagayan de Oro City	Vice President
Daryl Anne Doyo	Manila	Secretary
Nonisto Molina	Bulacan	Assistant Secretary
Noel Paran	Davao del Norte – Tagum City	Treasurer
Camille Ingking	Bohol	Assistant Treasurer
Charisse Mae Salcedo	Ozamiz City	Auditor
Gian Carlo Aceron	Camarines Norte	P.R.O.
Stephanie Mabelle Bebiera	Negros Occidental – Bacolod City	Assistant P.R.O.

=== 2011-2013 ===
Name	Chapter	Position
Jan Ehlvest Bo	Manila	President
Allan Claveria	Pangasinan - Dagupan–San Carlos City	Vice President
Emmanuel Pilayre	Bohol	Secretary
Mary Joyce Gurdiel	Zamboanga del Norte - Dipolog City	Assistant Secretary
Jhey-Ar Mangati	Ilocos Norte – Laoag City	Treasurer
Mi Amor Intal	Davao del Sur	Assistant Treasurer
Karl Chester Intia	Camarines Sur	Auditor
Mycl Angeli Sumalinog	Agusan del Norte - Butuan City	P.R.O.
Noe John Joseph Sacramento	Guimaras	Assistant P.R.O.

=== 2013-2014 ===
Name	Chapter	Position
Reynard Leo Francisco	Rizal	President
Elcy Kieth Debildos	Davao City	Vice President
Marlouize Villanueva	Cebu City	Secretary
Michelle Emee Pongao	Iligan City	Assistant Secretary
Lucky Gem Cayetano	Ilocos Norte - Laoag City	Treasurer
Alyana Alyssa Marie Camu	Camarines Sur	Assistant Treasurer
Donna Rillon	Negros Oriental - Dumaguete City	Auditor
Fredirick Montemayor	Alaminos City-Western Pangasinan	P.R.O.
Alyssa Marie Catalan	Zamboanga del Sur - Pagadian City	Assistant P.R.O.
Mc Robert Rebua	Manila	Area 4 Coordinator

=== 2015 ===
Name	Chapter	Position
Elcy Kieth Debildos	Davao City	President
Marlouize Villanueva	Cebu City	Secretary
Michelle Emee Pongao	Iligan City	Assistant Secretary
Lucky Gem Cayetano	Ilocos Norte - Laoag City	Treasurer
Alyana Alyssa Marie Camu	Camarines Sur	Assistant Treasurer
Donna Rillon	Negros Oriental - Dumaguete City	Auditor
Fredirick Montemayor	Alaminos City-Western Pangasinan	P.R.O.
Alyssa Marie Catalan	Zamboanga del Sur - Pagadian City	Assistant P.R.O.
Mc Robert Rebua	Manila	Area 4 Coordinator

=== 2015-2017 ===
Name	Chapter	Position
Novey Robert Dolde	Agusan del Norte - Butuan City	President
Roghie Saquing	Caloocan City	Vice President
Marie Grace Sumondong	Zamboanga del Norte - Dipolog City	Secretary
Eva Marie Lorzano	Southern Leyte	Assistant Secretary
Mark Arlord Gaudia	La Union - San Fernando City	Treasurer
James Charlie Salva	Camarines Norte	Assistant Treasurer
Dexter Salim	Davao Oriental	Auditor
Jan Paolo Martin	Tarlac	P.R.O.
Ricardo Palajos	Capiz	Assistant P.R.O.

=== 2017-2019 ===
Name	Chapter	Position	Area of Responsibility
Mark Brayn Yaung	Negros Occidental-Bacolod City	President	Area 5
Roneil Aliman	Agusan del Norte-Butuan City	Vice President	Area 8
Melanie Canonigo	Bohol	Secretary	Area 6
Cleo Ross Dela Rosa	Zamboanga City	Assistant Secretary	Area 7
David Dichoso	Quirino	Treasurer	Area 1
Aljhon Rei Trance	Albay-Legazpi	Assistant Treasurer	Area 3
Justine Rae Aboy	Pangasinan	Auditor	Area 2
Griethel Pond	Compostella Valley	PRO	Area 9
Melfe Calda	Manila	Asst PRO	Area 4

=== 2019-2021 ===
Name	Chapter	Position	Area of Responsibility
Mark Brayn Yaung	Negros Occidental-Bacolod City	President	Area 5
Melfe Calda	Manila	Vice President	Area 4
Melanie Canonigo	Bohol	Secretary	Area 6
Cleo Ross Dela Rosa	Zamboanga City	Assistant Secretary	Area 7
Aljhon Rei Trance	Albay-Legazpi	Treasurer	Area 3
Patrick Ian Aragoncillo	Davao City	Assistant Treasurer	Area 9
Justine Rae Aboy	Pangasinan	Auditor	Area 2
Gliezel Maregmen	Agusan del Norte-Butuan City	Area 8 Youth Coordinator	Area 8

=== 2021 - to present ===
Name	Chapter	Position	Area of Responsibility
Jay-Ar Gallos	Rizal	President	Area 4
Inri Dominic Flores	Iloilo	Internal Vice President	Area 6
Rhey Lloyd Boloron	Bohol	External Vice President	Area 7
Joven James Monte G Bonjoc	Bukidnon	Secretary	Area 9
Jeffrey Alfelor	Camarines Sur	Finance Officer	Area 5
Joenie Novem Elocendo	Bulacan	PRO	Area 3
Marjurie Olario	Basilan	Member	Area 8
Catherine Osano	South Cotabato	Member	Area 10
Tristan Balanag	La Union	Area Coordinator	Area 1
