= Gwendolyn Pang =

Gwendolyn T. Pang
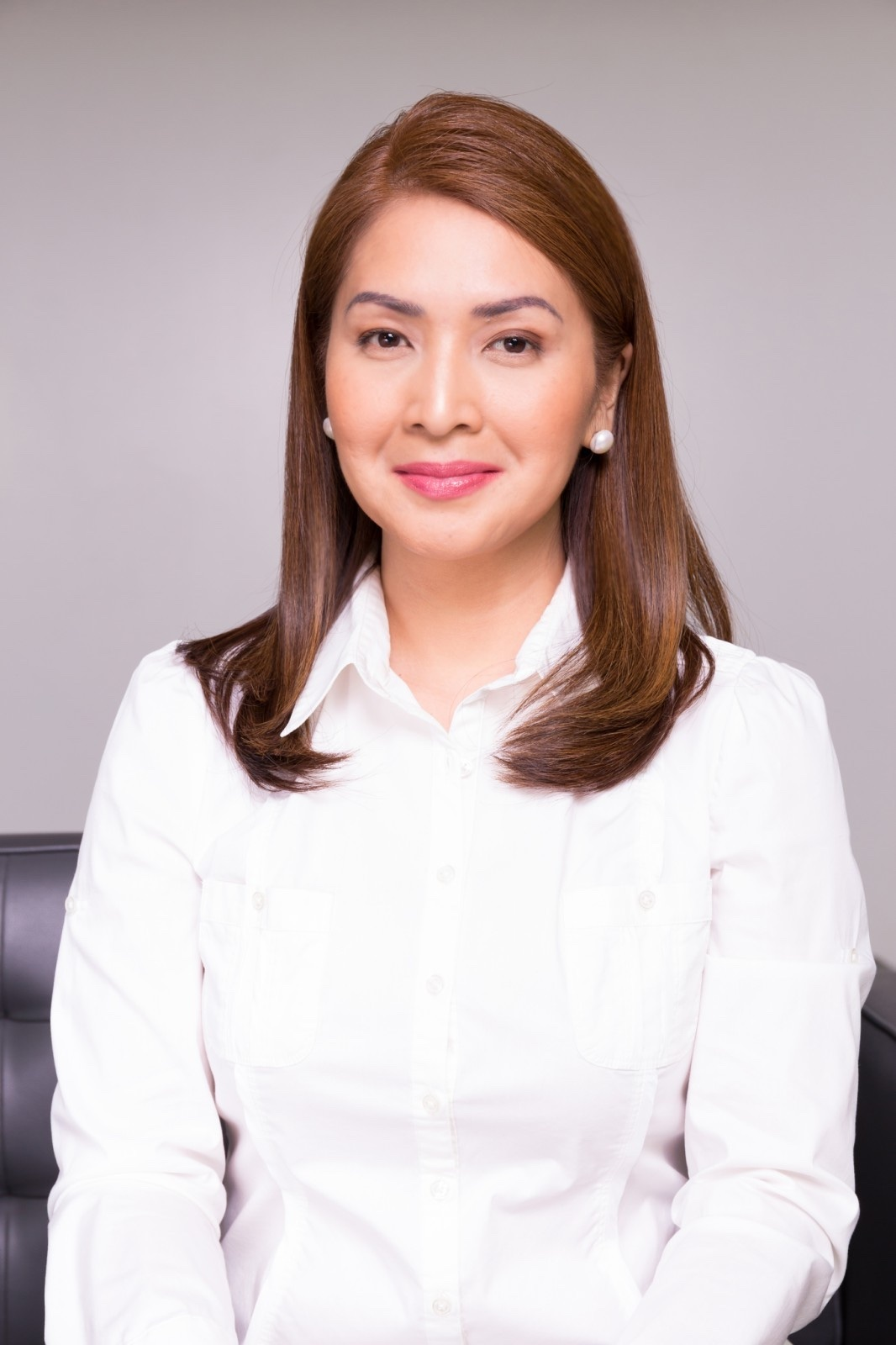

Secretary General of the Philippine Red Cross
- Incumbent
- Assumed office October 2022

Gwendolyn T. Pang is a Filipino humanitarian and the Secretary General of the Philippine Red Cross (PRC). She previously served in various senior positions in the International Federation of Red Cross and Red Crescent Societies (IFRC) and as an adviser and guest professor at the International Academy of Red Cross and Red Crescent in Suzhou, China, since 2019.

== Humanitarian work ==
Pang served as the youngest-ever Secretary General of the PRC. In 2015, she received the Florence Nightingale Medal from the International Committee of the Red Cross for her work as Secretary General in disaster and conflict situations.

In 2025, Pang participated in the launch of the Network on Anticipation, Risk, Resilience, and Adaptation (NARRA) project in Tarlac, meant to strengthen disaster resilience and preparedness. In June 2026, she led a PRC delegation visiting the Municipal Operations Center in Los Baños, Laguna, discussing disaster preparedness and emergency response with local officials.

== Controversy ==
In 2013, former Philippine Red Cross official Rosa Rosal called for Pang to be investigated regarding an alleged misuse of ₱200-million PRC funds for personal use and for tarpaulins for PRC Chairman and former Senator Richard Gordon. The allegations included claims that Pang used the money for expenses unrelated to humanitarian work and for materials bearing the name of PRC chairman Richard Gordon. Pang denied the allegations. According to a statement made by the PRC, Pang was "fully exonerated". The PRC also expressed "full-confidence" in her leadership, adding that such allegations are "entirely baseless" and was being done to discredit the PRC's work with disaster relief efforts for Typhoon Haiyan.

The allegations resurfaced in 2017 as then Senator Antonio Trillanes IV filed a plunder, graft, and malversation of public funds complaint with the Office of the Ombudsman against Gordon and Pang. Trillanes alleged that PRC funds, including funds originating from Gordon's congressional Priority Development Assistance Fund allocations, were used for irregular projects and alleged a connection to Gordon's political campaigns. The complaint was an allegation and did not establish wrongdoing by Pang. The PRC rejected the allegations, describing them as based on “false, old facts” and said that the projects in question had been undertaken by the organization as an implementing agency of the Department of Social Welfare and Development and that liquidation reports had been submitted.
