= Philippine Red Cross =

Non-governmental organization in the Philippines

- Seal of the Philippine Red Cross
- Abbreviation: PRC
- Formation: February 17, 1899 (as Cruz Roja Filipina); December 4, 1917 (as a chapter of the American Red Cross); April 15, 1947 (as an ICRC-recognized organization) (Note: This is the date that the PRC officially recognizes as their foundation date.)
- Type: Humanitarian organization
- Purpose: Humanitarian
- Headquarters: 37 EDSA corner Boni Avenue, Mandaluyong 1550, Philippines
- Region served: Philippines
- Members: International Federation of Red Cross and Red Crescent Societies (IFRC); International Red Cross and Red Crescent Movement
- Official language: Filipino and English
- Chairman of the Board of Governors: Richard J. Gordon
- Secretary General: Gwendolyn T. Pang
- Website: redcross.org.ph
- Formerly called: The Philippine National Red Cross

The Philippine Red Cross (PRC; Filipino: Krus na Pula ng Pilipinas; Spanish: Cruz Roja Filipina) is a non-profit humanitarian organization and a member of the International Red Cross and Red Crescent Movement.

The PRC was established in 1947, with roots in the Philippine Revolution against Spanish colonial rule. It was initially involved only in the provision of blood and short-term palliatives as well as participation in disaster-related activities but they now focus on a wider array of humanitarian services.

At present, the PRC provides six major services: National Blood Services, Disaster Management Services, Safety Services, Health Services, Welfare Services and Red Cross Youth. The National Headquarters of the PRC is located at 37 EDSA corner Boni Avenue, Mandaluyong, Metro Manila.

== History ==
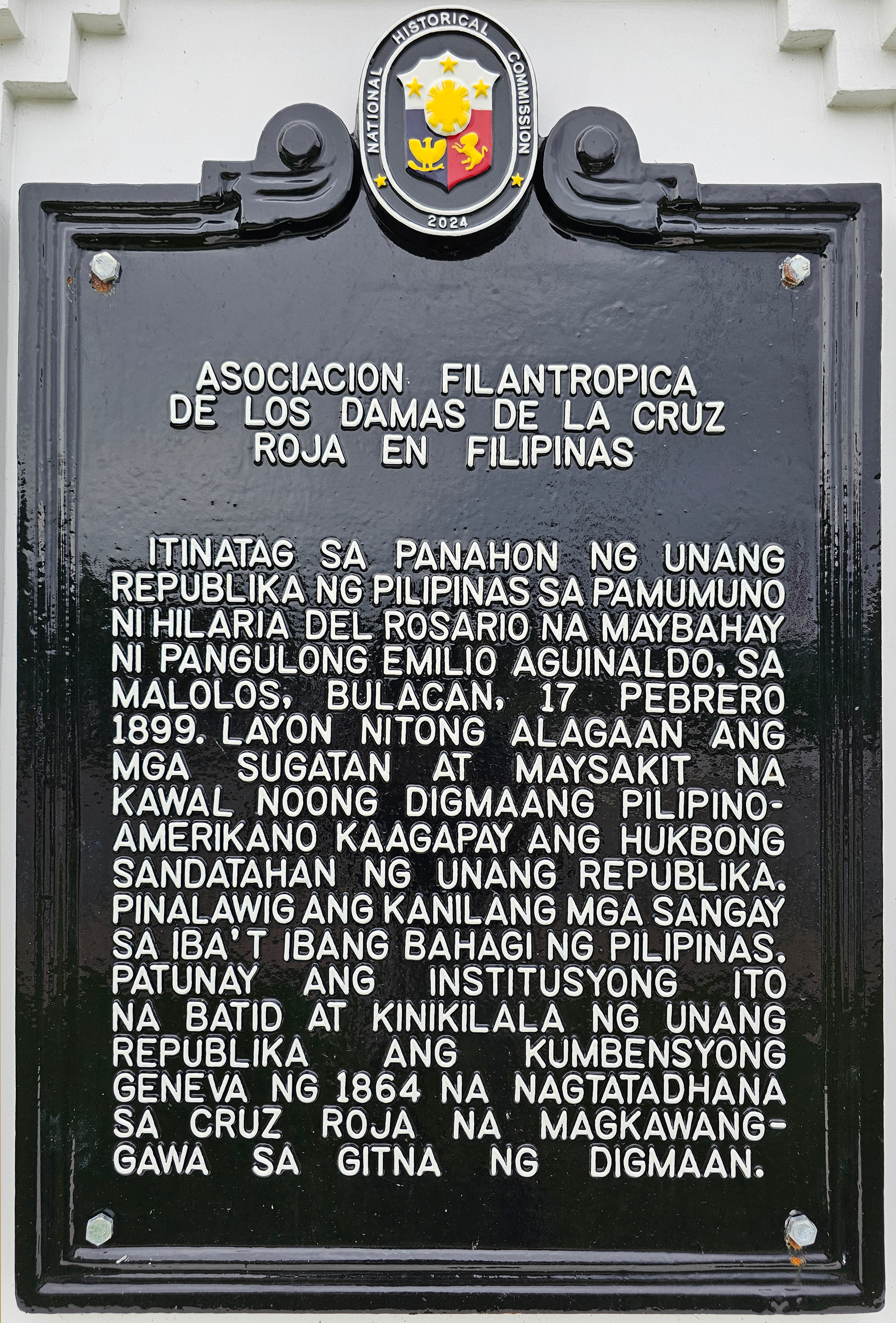
National historical marker unveiled in 2024 at the Bulacan Provincial Capitol commemorating the aspiring Red Cross society established under the First Philippine Republic

Apolinario Mabini encouraged the Malolos Republic to form a national Red Cross organization. On February 17, 1899, the Malolos Republic approved the Constitution of the National Association of the Red Cross. The government appointed Hilaria del Rosario de Aguinaldo – the consort of President Emilio Aguinaldo – as the first head of the association. She cared for wounded soldiers and their families and established the Hijas de la Revolución (Daughters of the Revolution) that later became Asociación Filantrópica de los Damas de la Cruz Roja en Filipinas (Red Cross Association), considered a precursor of the present Philippine Red Cross, and for this she raised funds for medicines and other medical supplies.

Filipino diplomat Felipe Agoncillo met with Gustave Moynier, an original member of the International Red Cross and Red Crescent Movement (ICRC) president on August 29, 1900. He sought recognition of the Filipino Red Cross Society as well as the application of the First Geneva Convention during the Philippine–American War.

On August 30, 1905, the American Red Cross (ARC) formed a Philippine Branch with Filipino and American leaders at the Ayuntamiento. After several years of continuous effort, the ANRC officially recognized it as a chapter on December 4, 1917.

In 1934, President Manuel L. Quezon established an independent Philippine Red Cross (PRC). However, because the Philippines was a territory and later a Commonwealth under United States sovereignty, it could not sign the Geneva Conventions and therefore it could not be recognized by the ICRC. In 1942, during the Japanese occupation of the Philippines, the Japanese created a Philippine Red Cross that they controlled to care for internees. Once Manila was liberated by combined American and Filipino forces in 1945, local Red Cross officials and the ANRC re-established an independent Red Cross.

The Philippines gained independence from the United States on July 4, 1946. Dr. J. Horacio Yanzon was appointed the first Filipino Red Cross manager in December 1946, with thirty-six Red Cross chapters initially set up in the country. On February 14, 1947, President Manuel A. Roxas signed the Treaty of Geneva and the Prisoners of War Convention. On March 22, 1947, President Roxas signed Republic Act 95, the PRC charter.

The ICRC approved the recognition of the PRC, and telegraphed First Lady Aurora Aragon Quezon, the first PRC chairman, on March 29, 1947. The PRC had an inaugural ceremony on April 15, 1947.

The PRC was admitted as a bona fide member of the League of Red Cross and Red Crescent Societies on September 17, 1947.

Since 2004, the chairman of the PRC Board of Governors is Senator Richard J. Gordon. Since 1965, actress Rosa Rosal has sat on the Board of Governors. Rosal was awarded in 1999 the Ramon Magsaysay Award for Public Service for her activities with the PRC.

=== The Philippine Red Cross Act of 2009 ===
In 2009, Republic Act No. 10072 or the Philippine Red Cross Act of 2009, was signed into law by President Gloria Macapagal Arroyo. The law is an affirmation of the country's "conformity with the Geneva Conventions of 1949 and their additional protocols, and the Statutes of the International Red Cross and Red Crescent Movement", as well as a confirmation of the PRC's stand as a "voluntary, independent and autonomous nongovernmental society auxiliary to the authorities of the Republic of the Philippines in the humanitarian field".

Apart from the apparent change in the organization's name from "Philippine National Red Cross" to "Philippine Red Cross", included in the act's new provisions is the organizations' exemption from real property taxes, direct and indirect taxes, duties and fees that will emerge from its operations and its exclusive importations and purchases.

== Equipment ==
=== Emergency Medical Services vehicles ===
A list of vehicles presently used.

Photos	Model	Origin	Type	Number of units	Note
	Toyota Hiace and its variants	Japan	Ambulance	117+	used in all Philippine Red Cross Chapter
	Toyota Land Cruiser LC 78	Japan	Ambulance 4X4		used in all Philippine Red Cross Chapter
	Ford E-250	United States	Ambulance	3	used in National Headquarters
	Ford Ranger	United States	Ambulance 4X4		used in all Philippine Red Cross Chapter
	Foton TransVan HR	China	Ambulance		used in selected Philippine Red Cross Chapter
	Isuzu Elf	Japan	Ambulance Truck		used in selected Philippine Red Cross Chapter
	Mitsubishi Canter	Japan	Ambulance Truck		used in selected Philippine Red Cross Chapter
	Nissan Urvan	Japan	Ambulance		used in selected Philippine Red Cross Chapter
	Nissan Atlas	Japan	Ambulance Truck		used in selected Philippine Red Cross Chapter

=== Firefighting appliances ===
Photos	Model	Origin	Type	Note
	Hino Ranger	Japan	Light Fire engine	used by Emergency Response Unit
	Isuzu Elf	Japan	Light Fire engine	used by Emergency Response Unit
	Mitsubishi Fuso	Japan	Heavy Fire engine / Water tender	used by Emergency Response Unit
	Mitsubishi Canter	Japan	Light Fire engine	used by Emergency Response Unit
	Nissan Safari	Japan	Mini Pumper	used by Emergency Response Unit

=== Disaster response equipment ===
Land Assets
Photos	Model	Origin	Type	Note
	LARC-V	United States	Amphibian vehicle	used in National Headquarters
	Humvees	United States	Off-road Emergency Vehicles	used in selected Philippine Red Cross Chapter
	Isuzu NPR	Japan	Disaster response vehicle	used by Emergency Response Unit
	Isuzu SKW 8PD1	Japan	Military rescue truck	for Humanitarian aid purpose
