= Saehan BU Series Bus =

GM Korea introduced the BU series bus in 1976 using the MAN diesel powered U engine platform. Several platforms were built in this series. In 1977, Saehan Motors took over the GM Korea bus operation. The BU series continues to be made.

== BU100 ==
BU100

Overview
- Manufacturer: GM Korea; Saehan Motors
- Production: July 1976 - January 1980
- Assembly: Busanjin, Busan, South Korea

Body and chassis
- Layout: Rear-engine, rear-wheel-drive layout

Powertrain
- Engine: MAN D2156HM-U (10350 cc)

Dimensions
- Length: 10 metres

Chronology
- Successor: Saehan BR101

GM Korea made the BU100 platform with 10 meter length version starting July 1976. It was equipped with rear mounted MAN D0846HM-U diesel engine. The marquee was renamed to Saehan (SMC) after it took over the bus division, but the series' name remained until January 1980.

== BU110 ==
BU110

Overview
- Manufacturer: GM Korea; Saehan Motors
- Production: July 1976 - March 1982
- Assembly: Busanjin, Busan, South Korea

Body and chassis
- Class: Direct Bus; Tourist Bus; Express Bus
- Layout: Rear-engine, rear-wheel-drive layout

Powertrain
- Engine: MAN D2156HM-U (10350 cc)

Dimensions
- Wheelbase: 5,500 mm
- Length: 11,950 mm
- Width: 2,460 mm
- Height: 3,040 mm

Chronology
- Predecessor: Shinjin RC420TP
- Successor: Saehan BV113

GM Korea reintroduced the express bus class of BU110 series a few years after they took over Shinjin Motors with the 11 meter bus length class. Some of these buses were exported to Egypt. The same engine platform is also used for the 10 meter counterpart. The marquee was changed after Saehan Motors (SMC) took over.

== BU120 ==
BU120

Overview
- Manufacturer: Saehan Motors
- Production: November 1976 - November 1982
- Assembly: Busanjin, Busan, South Korea

Body and chassis
- Class: Direct Bus; Express Bus
- Layout: Rear-engine, rear-wheel-drive layout

Powertrain
- Engine: MAN D2156HM-U (10350 cc)

Dimensions
- Length: 12 metres

Chronology
- Predecessor: Shinjin RC420TP
- Successor: Daewoo BS120CN

Saehan introduced BU120 with a stretched to 12 meter length sold for Seoul city transit as well as express bus services. Due to the length of the chassis on city roads, it was not a commercial success for city transit area. Only 183 buses were made before it was dropped.

=== Color scheme ===
The factory default color scheme was an all-white body with orange stripes. Another scheme used was a green body with alternating slant colors to white strip. The city bus version is painted with horizontal color in white with main colour purple.

== See also ==
- GM Korea Motor Company (1972~1976)
