= Zyle Daewoo Bus =

South Korean bus manufacturer

- Formerly: Zyle Daewoo Commercial Vehicle
- Type: Public
- Industry: Automotive
- Founded: 1955; 71 years ago
- Headquarters: Ulju-gun, Ulsan, South Korea; Bucheon, Gyeonggi, South Korea
- Area served: Asia, Latin America and Middle East
- Key people: Byungsoo Baik, President and CEO
- Products: Buses
- Revenue: ▲ ₩300.2 billion
- Total equity: ▲ ₩100.6 billion
- Number of employees: 5,000
- Parent: Young An Hat Company
- Website: daewoobus.co.kr

- Zyle Daewoo Bus
- Hangul: 자일대우상용차
- Hanja: 秭一大宇商用車
- RR: Jail Daeu sangyongcha
- MR: Chail Taeu sangyongch'a

Zyle Daewoo Bus, formerly "Zyle Daewoo Commercial Vehicle" is a South Korean manufacturer of buses and is majority owned by Young-An Hat Company, based in Busan. It was established in 2002 as a successor to previous merger, Daewoo Motor Company. These buses are primarily used for public transportation. Daewoo Bus has been in a partnership in 2006 with GM Daewoo (now GM Korea).

== Operations ==
=== Current Production ===
Daewoo Bus' principal subsidiaries and partners are:

- Zyle Daewoo Bus Corporation (Ulsan, South Korea)
- Shanghai Wanxiang Daewoo Bus (Shanghai, China)
- Guilin Daewoo (Guilin, China)
- Daewoo Bus Costa Rica S.A. (San José, Costa Rica)
- Daewoo Bus Vietnam (Vĩnh Phúc, Vietnam)
- Daewoo Bus Kazakhstan (Semey, Kazakhstan)
- Daewoo Pak Motors (Pvt.) Ltd. (Karachi, Pakistan)
- Columbian Manufacturing Corporation (Santa Rosa, Laguna, Philippines)
- Master Transportation Bus Manufacturing Ltd. (Taiwan)
- Daewoo Bus Myanmar (Yangon, Myanmar)

=== Former Production ===
Daewoo Bus Busan Plant. (1960 - ?)

== Current products ==
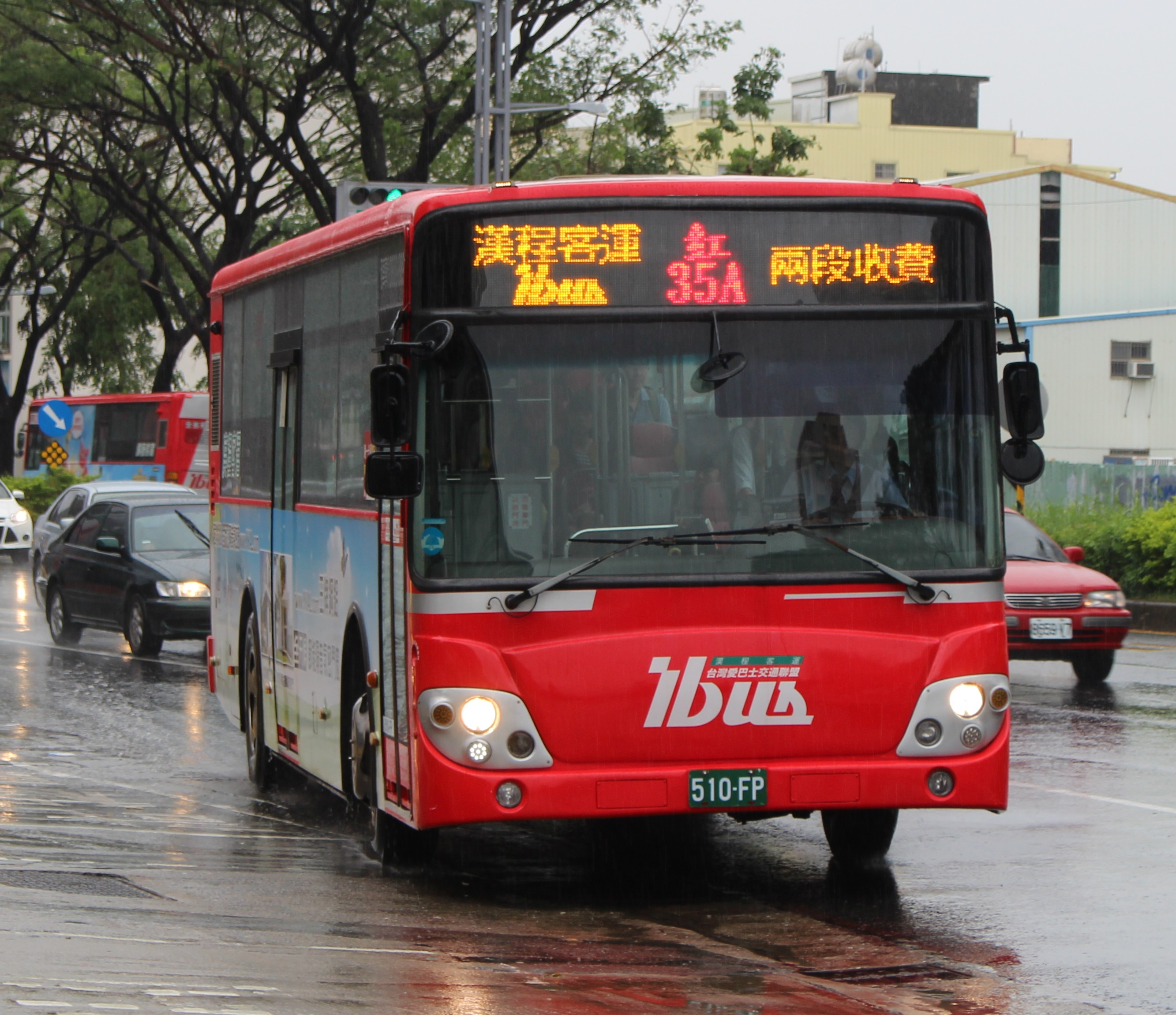
Daewoo BC211M by Han-Cheng Bus

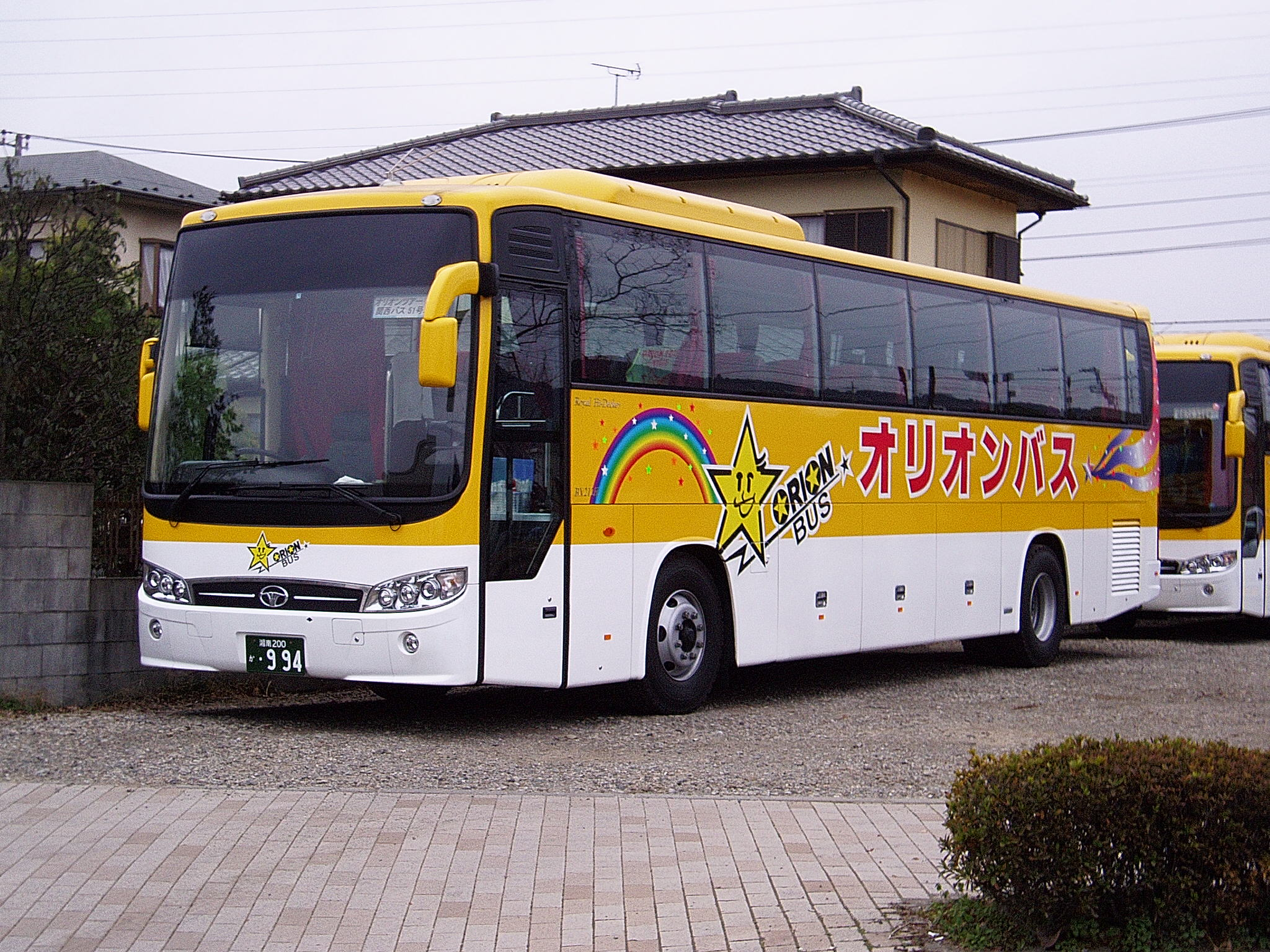
Daewoo Bus BX212 for Sugisaki Kankō Bus, Japan

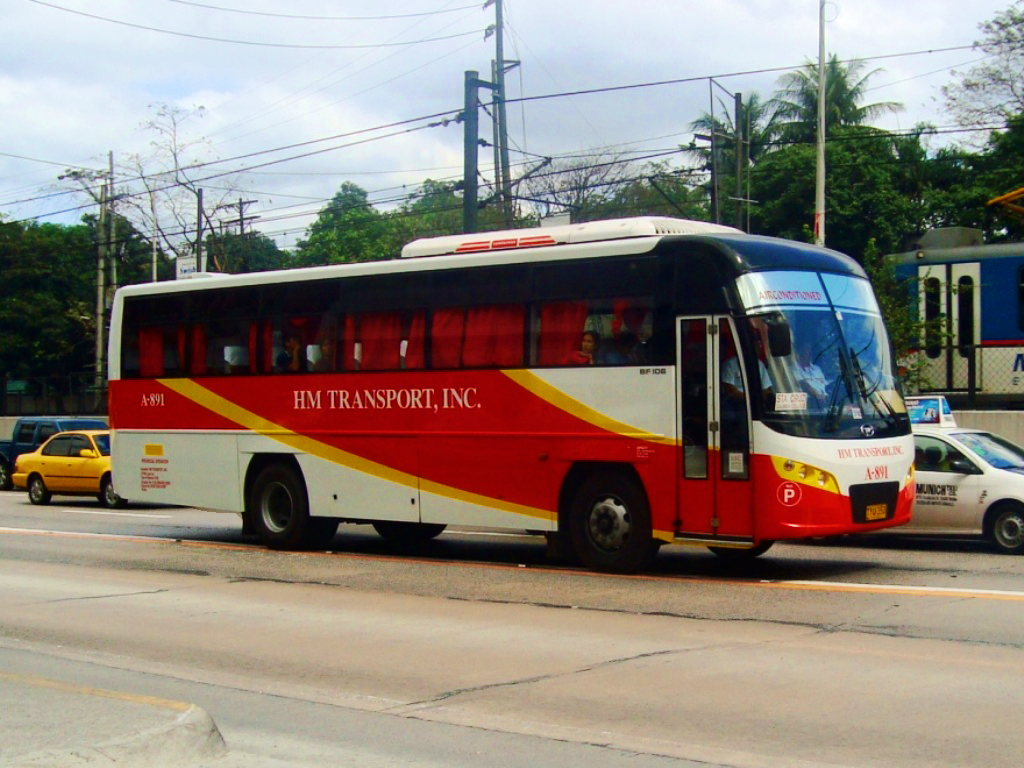
Daewoo BF106 operated by HM Transport Inc. Bodied in the Philippines.

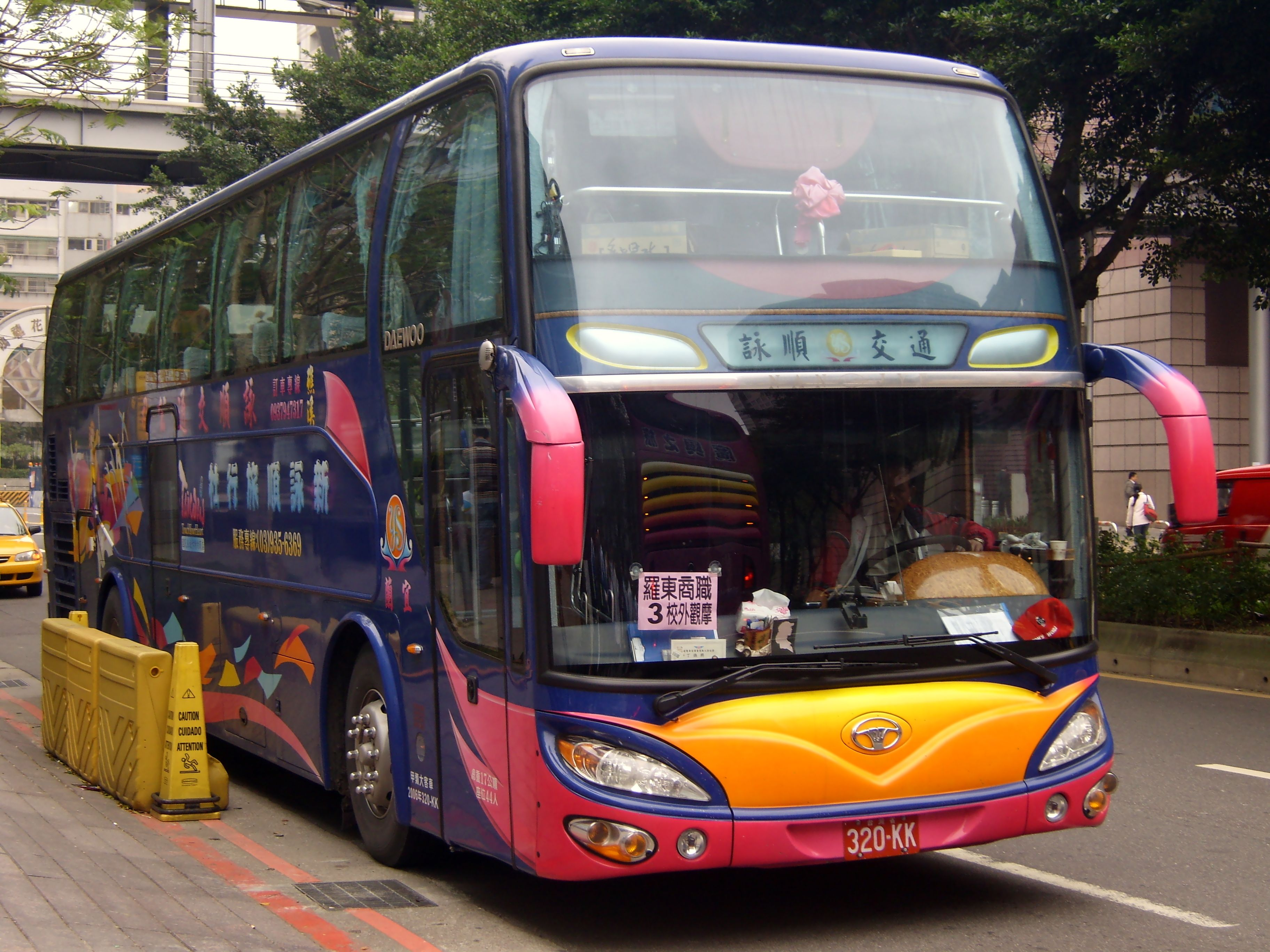
Daewoo BH117K Nan Jye bodied in Taiwan.

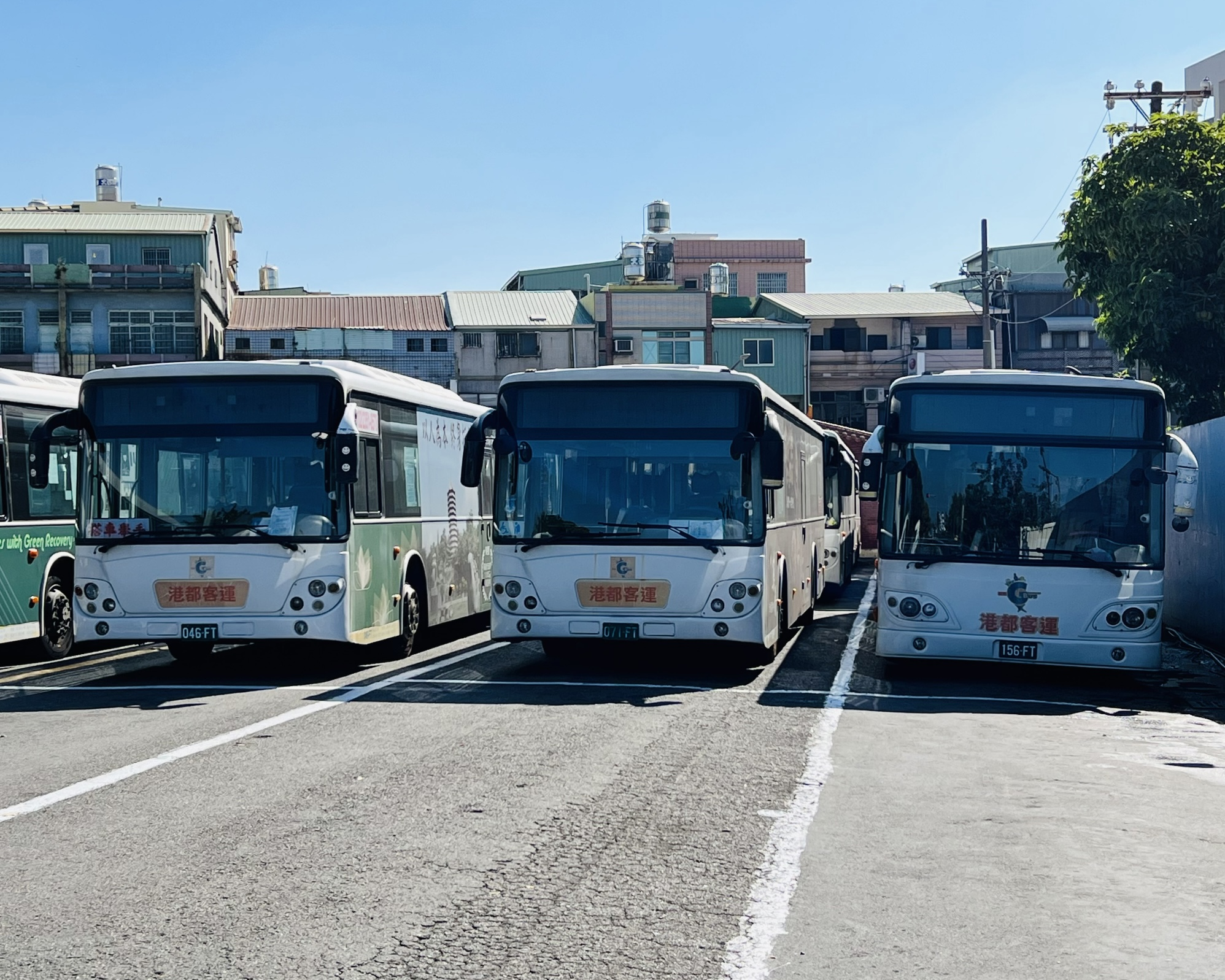
Daewoo BS120CN and BS120SN operated by Great City Life Bus of Kaohsiung

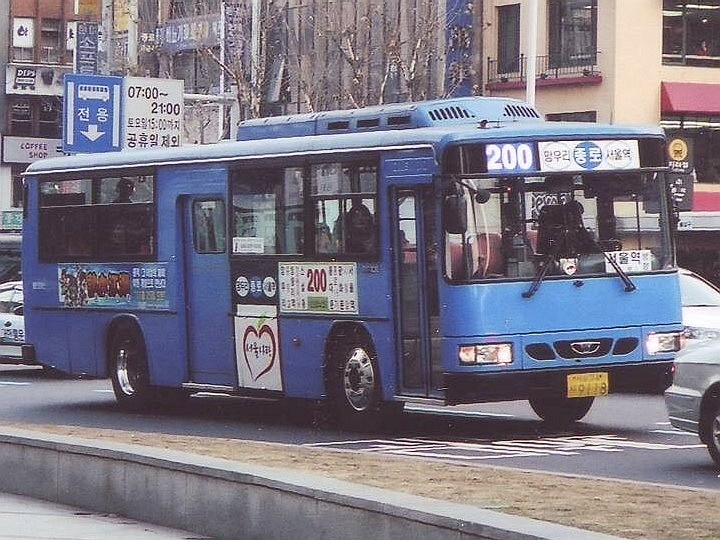
Daewoo BS106 by MetroBus

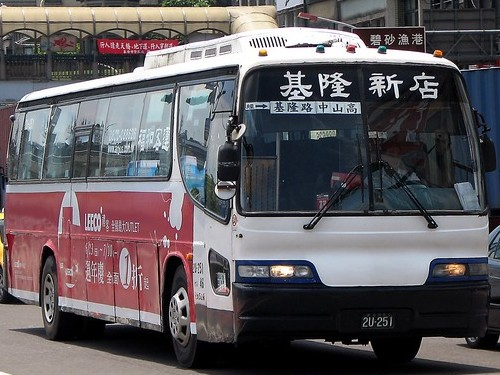
Daewoo BH117H by Fuhobus Inc.

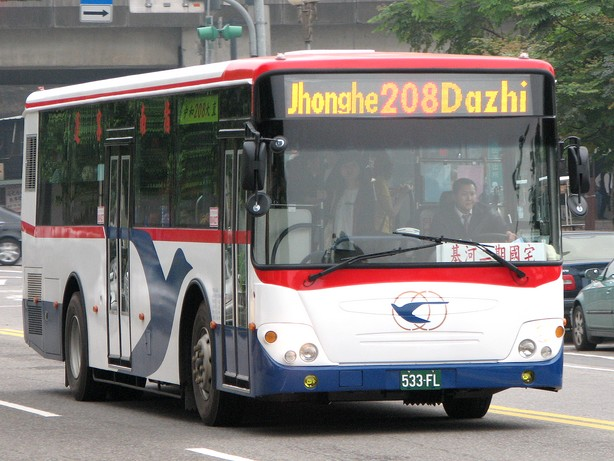
Daewoo BC211MA

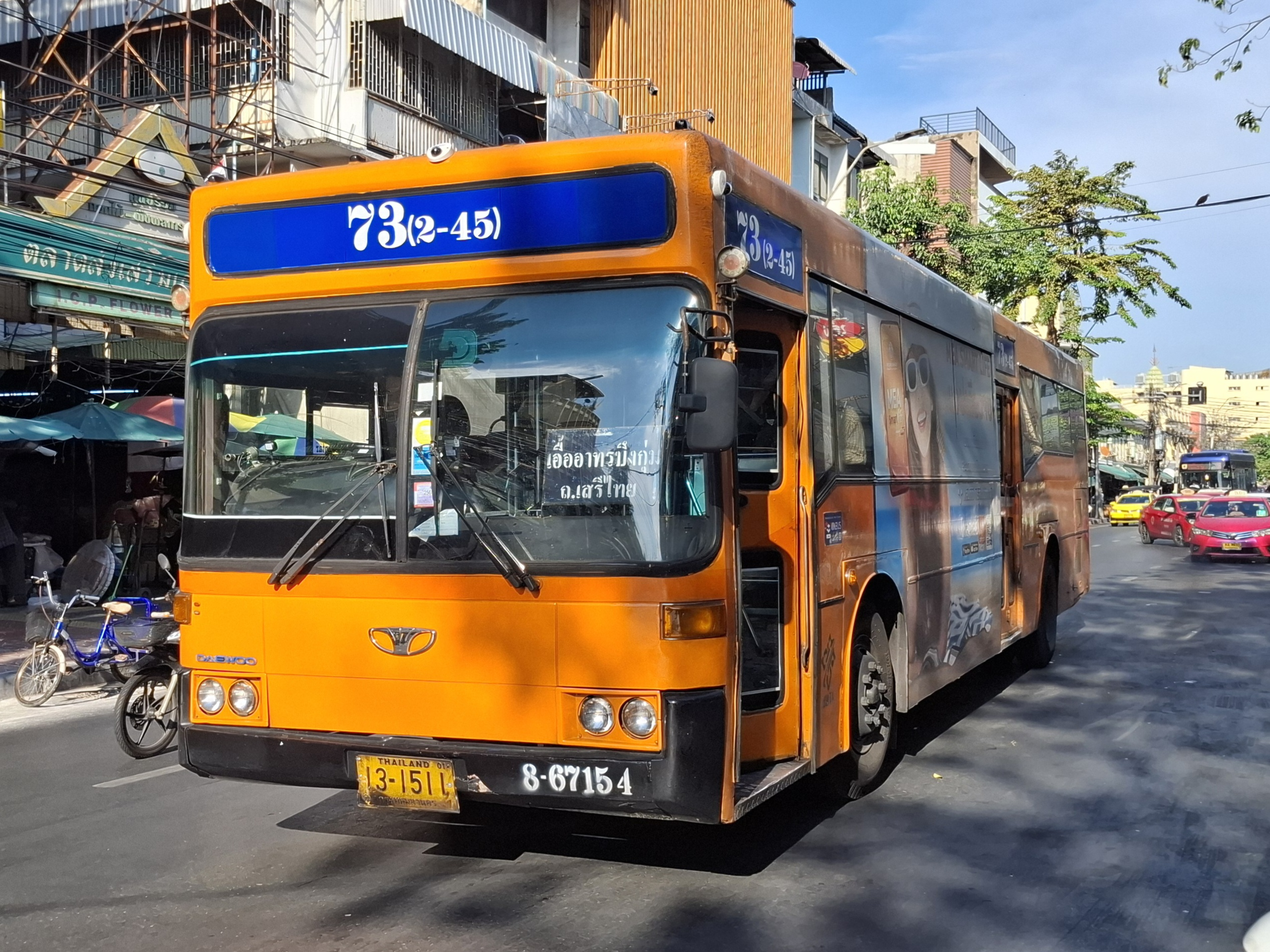
DAEWOO BH115 (Route 73) in Bangkok, Thailand

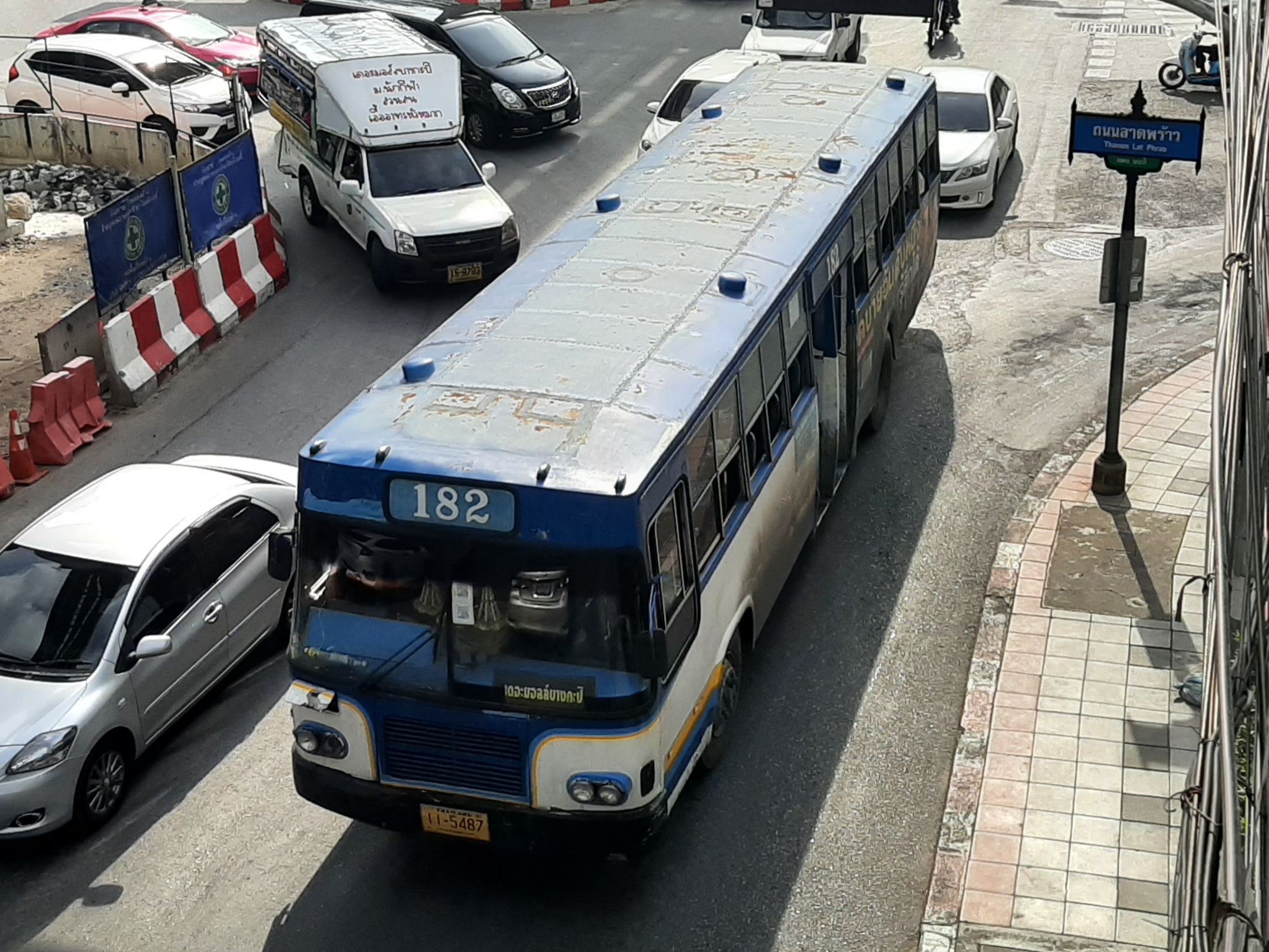
DAEWOO BF120DS (Route 182) in Bangkok, Thailand

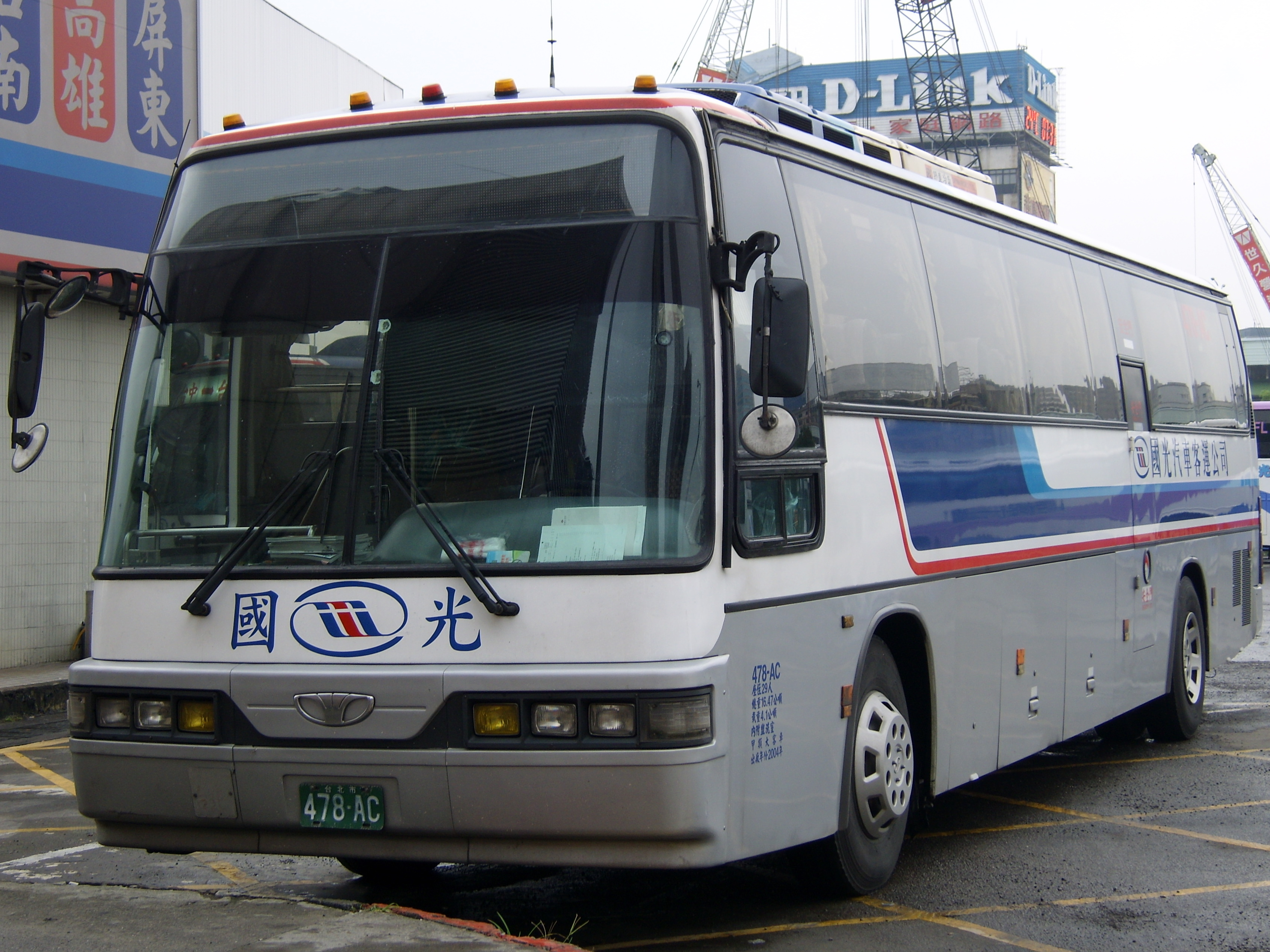
Daewoo BH120-3T by Kuo-Kuang Motor Transportation

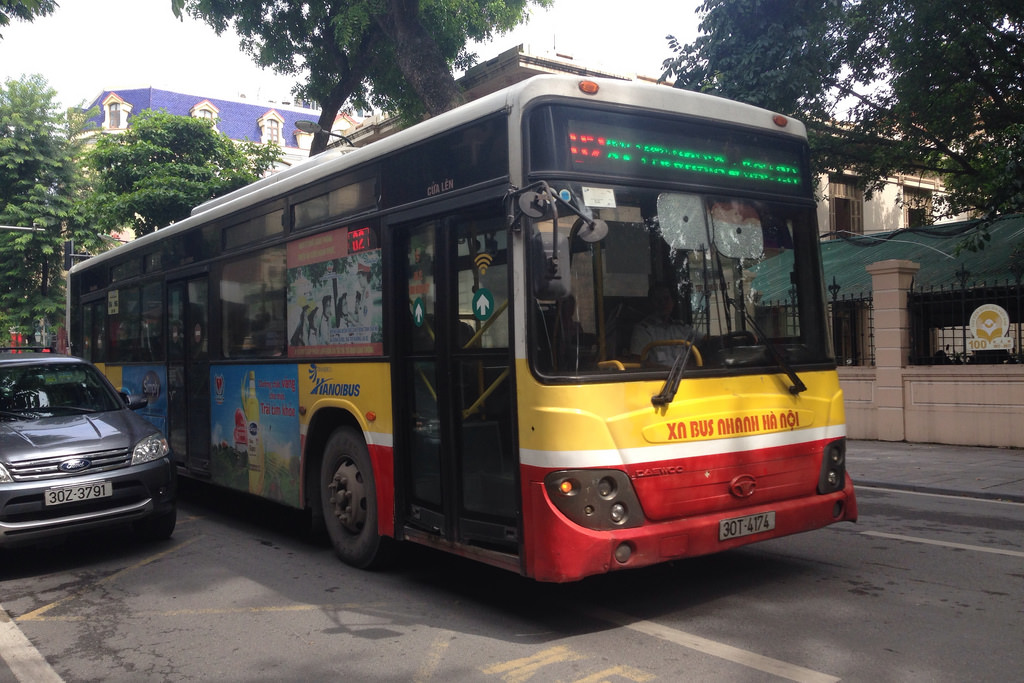
Daewoo BC212 (Route 02) at Tràng Thi, Hanoi

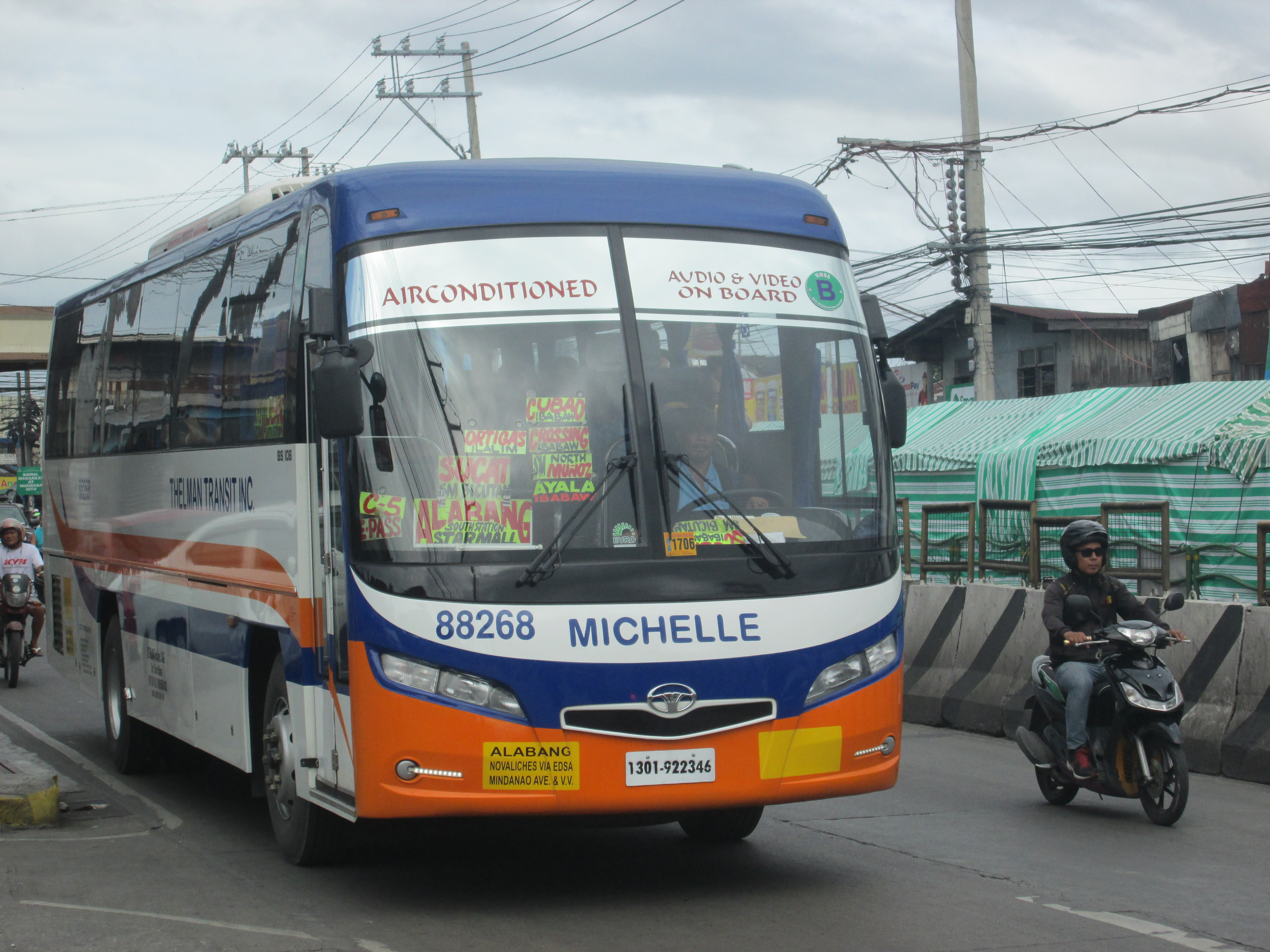
Daewoo BS106 of Thelman Transit, Inc.

Large heavy-duty buses

- BX212M Royal Plus
- FX120 Cruising Star
- FX116 Cruising Arrow

Small medium-duty bus

- BH090 Royal Star

Intercity buses

- BS120CN
- BC211MA
- BS106 Royal City
- BS090 Royal Midi

Columbian Manufacturing Corporation / Santarosa Motor Works (Philippine market)

- BV115
- BS106
- BH117H
- BS120S

Guilin Daewoo

- GL6127HK
- GL6128HK
- GDW6117HK
- GL6129HC
- GL6128HW
- GDW6120HG
- GDW6900
- GDW6900HGD
- GDW6901HGD1

== Former products ==
See also GM Daewoo

=== Shinjin Motor (1955–1971) ===
- Shinjin Micro Bus (1962)
- Shinjin Light Bus (1965)
- Pioneer (1965)
- FB100LK (1966)
- B-FB-50 (1966)
- DB102L (1968)
- DHB400C (1970)
- DAB (1970)
- RC420TP (1971)

=== GM Korea Motor Company (1972–1976) ===
- DB105LC (1972)
- BD50DL (1973)
- BLD24 (1973)
- BD098 (1976)
- BD101 (1976)
- BU100/110 (1976)

=== Saehan Motor Company (1976–1983) ===
- BU120 (1976)
- BL064 (1977)
- BF101 (1977)
- BR101 (1980)
- BH120 (1981)
- BV113 (1982)
- BF105 (1982)

=== Daewoo Motor Company (1st, 1983–1994) ===
- BV101 (1983)
- BH120S (1983)
- BH115Q (1984)
- BH120H (1985)
- BS105S (1985)
- BS105 (1986)
- BU113 (1986)
- BH115H (1986)
- BH115 (1986)
- BF120 (1987)
- BS106 (1990)
- BH120F (1992)
- BH113 (1994)

=== Daewoo Heavy Industry (1994–1999) ===
- BH117H (1995)
- BM090 (1996)
- BH116 (1997)
- BH115E (1998)

=== Daewoo Motor Company (2nd, 1999–2002) ===
- BF106 (2001)
- BH090 (2001)
- BS090 (2002)
- BV120MA (2002)
- BS120CN (2002)

=== Daewoo Bus (2002–2013) ===
- BH119 (2003)
- BX212H/S (2004)
- BC211M (2005)
- DM 1724 urban bus
- DM 1731 suburban bus
- FX series (2007)
- BC212MA (2007)

=== Colombian Manufacturing Corporation /Santarosa Motor Works ===
- BF106 (2009)
- BS106 NGV (2010)
- BV115 (2009)
- BH117 (2017)

=== Zyle Daewoo bus ===
- BH119 (2003)
- BX212H/S (2004)
- BC211M (2005)
- DM 1724 urban bus
- DM 1731 suburban bus
- FX series (2007)
- BC212MA (2007)
- LESTAR (2013)

=== Zyle Daewoo Commercial Vehicle ===
- BX212M (2019)
