= Hino Blue Ribbon =

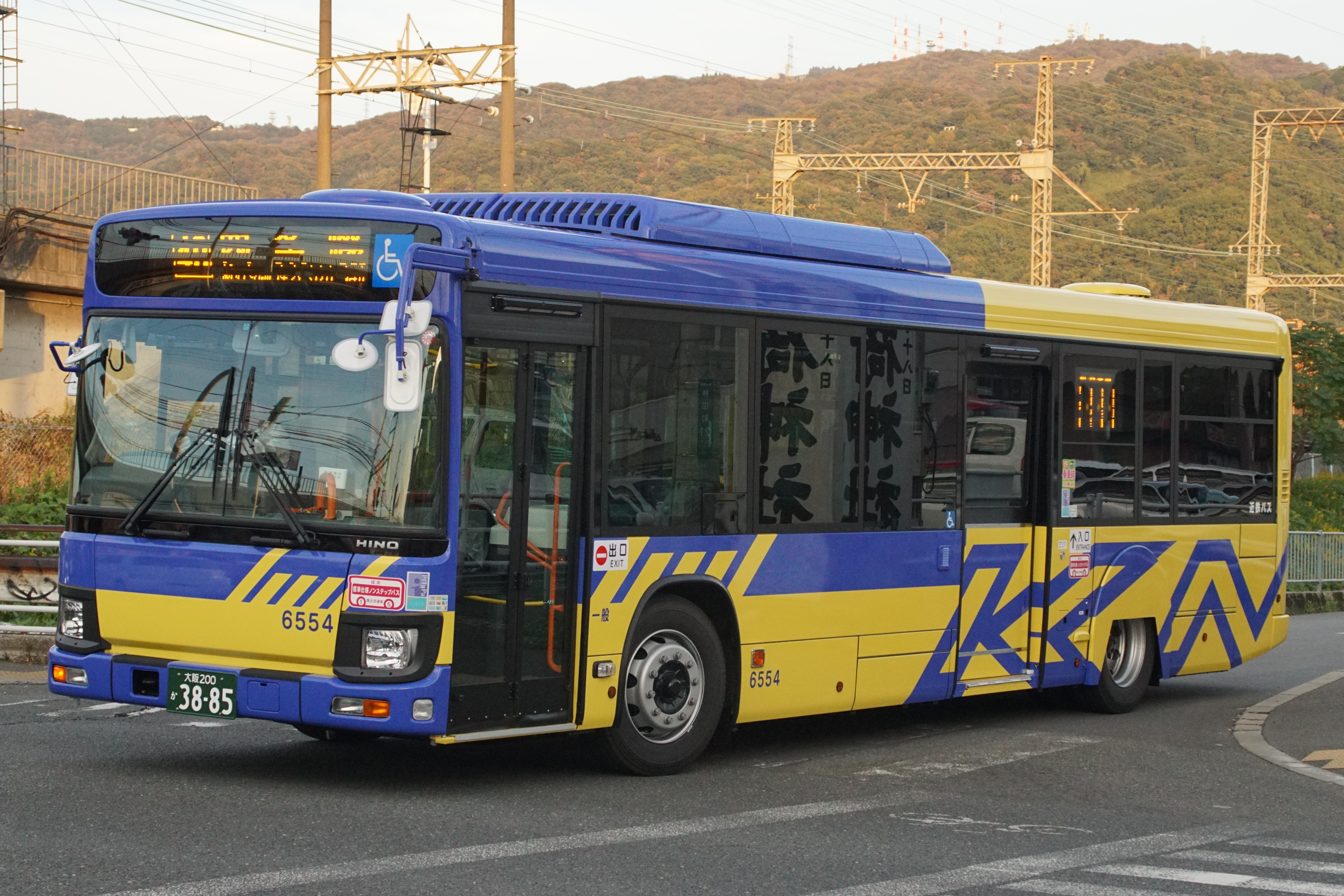
- Hino Blue Ribbon of Kintetsu Bus

Overview
- Manufacturer: J-Bus
- Also called: Isuzu Erga
- Production: 1982–present

Body and chassis
- Class: Complete bus Bus chassis
- Body style: Single-decker bus Single-decker coach
- Doors: 1 or 2
- Floor type: Low entry Low floor Step entrance
- Related: Isuzu Erga

Powertrain
- Transmission: Hino (manual)/ZF (automatic)

Dimensions
- Length: 9.4m, 10.1m, 10.8m
- Width: 2.55m
- Height: 3.0m

Chronology
- Predecessor: Hino RE/RC; Hino RS Skeleton (Tourist coach)
- Successor: Hino S'elega (Tourist coach)

The Hino Blue Ribbon (Japanese: 日野・ブルーリボン) is a heavy-duty single-decker bus produced by Hino Motors through the J-Bus joint venture. The model range is primarily available as a city bus and a tourist coach. It is manufactured by J-Bus either as a complete bus or as a bus chassis.

== RE/RC series (1960–1984) ==
- RB10-P (1960)
- RB10 (1961)
- RC10-P (1961)
- RC100-P (1962)
- RE100 (1967)
- RC300/320 (1967)
- RE101/121/141/161 (1977)
- RC301/321/381 (1977)
- RC701P/721P (1979)
- K-RE101/121/141/161 (1980)
- K-RC301/321/381 (1980)
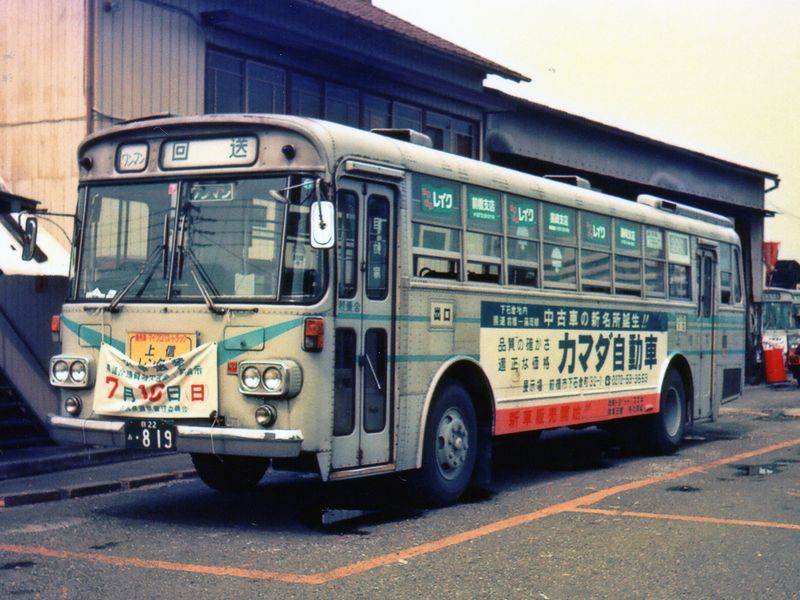
RE RE100

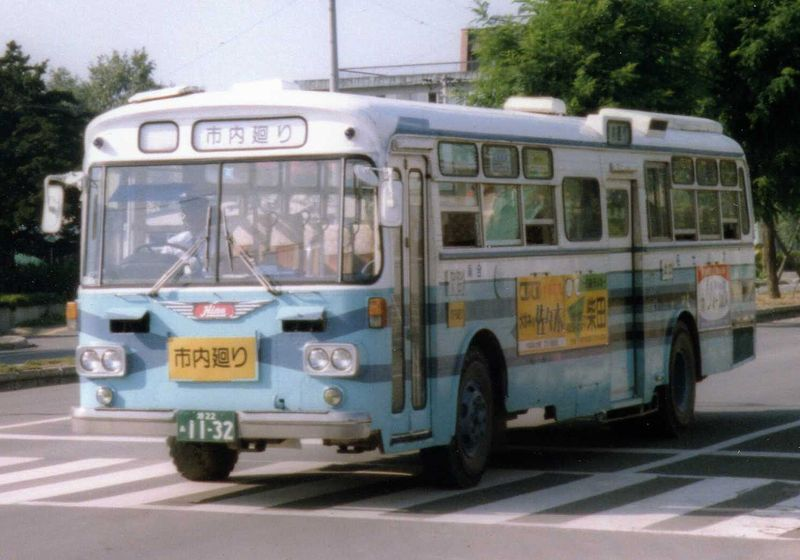
RC RC320P

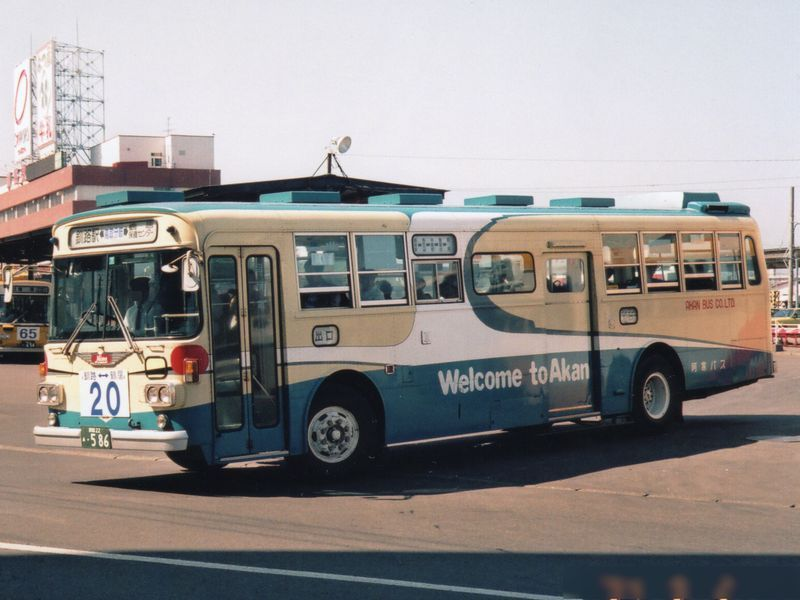
RC K-RC321

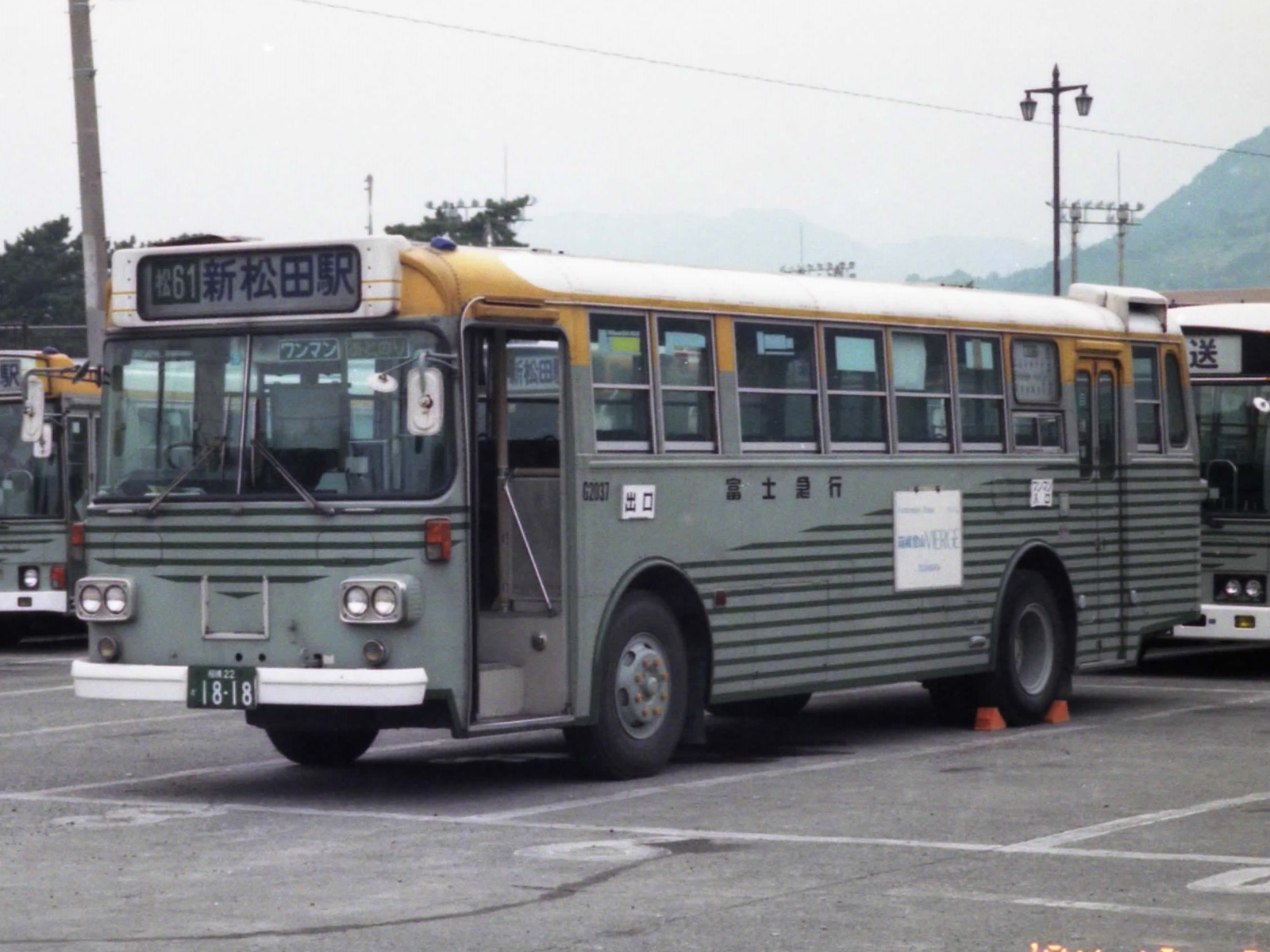
RC K-RC381

== Blue Ribbon (1982–2000) ==
=== One-step and two-step models ===
The Blue Ribbon series was introduced in 1982.

- The RT/RU22 was equipped with the EM100, a 6-cylinder 9.4 L diesel engine producing 225 PS.
- The HT/HU22 was powered by the ER200, a 6-cylinder 11.6 L diesel engine rated at 225 PS.
- The HT/HT23 and HT/HU2M used the M10U, a 6-cylinder 9.9 L diesel engine with an output of 230 PS.

Model timeline:

- K-RT/RU22 (1982)
- P-HT/HU22 (1984)
- P-HT/HU23 (1985)
- U-HT/HU2MLAA/MMAA/MPAA (1990)
- KC-HT/HU2MLCA/MMCA/MPCA (1995)

=== Non-step models ===
The Blue Ribbon non-step (low-entry) city bus was introduced at the 1997 Tokyo Motor Show.

- The HU2P was powered by the P11C, a 6-cylinder 10.5 L turbocharged diesel engine producing 250 PS.
- It was equipped with a ZF Ecomat automatic transmission as standard.

Model timeline:

- HU2PM/PP (1997)
- KC-HU2PMCE/PPCE (1998)
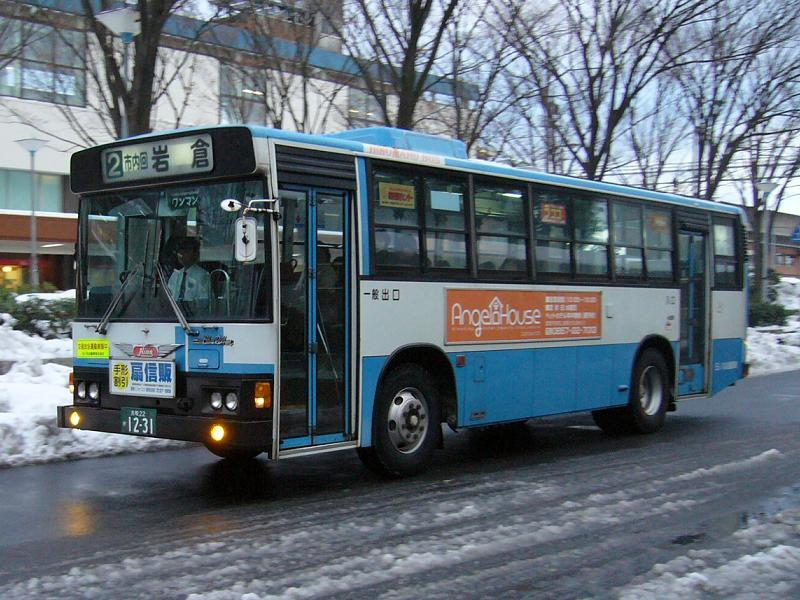
Blue Ribbon P-HU233BA

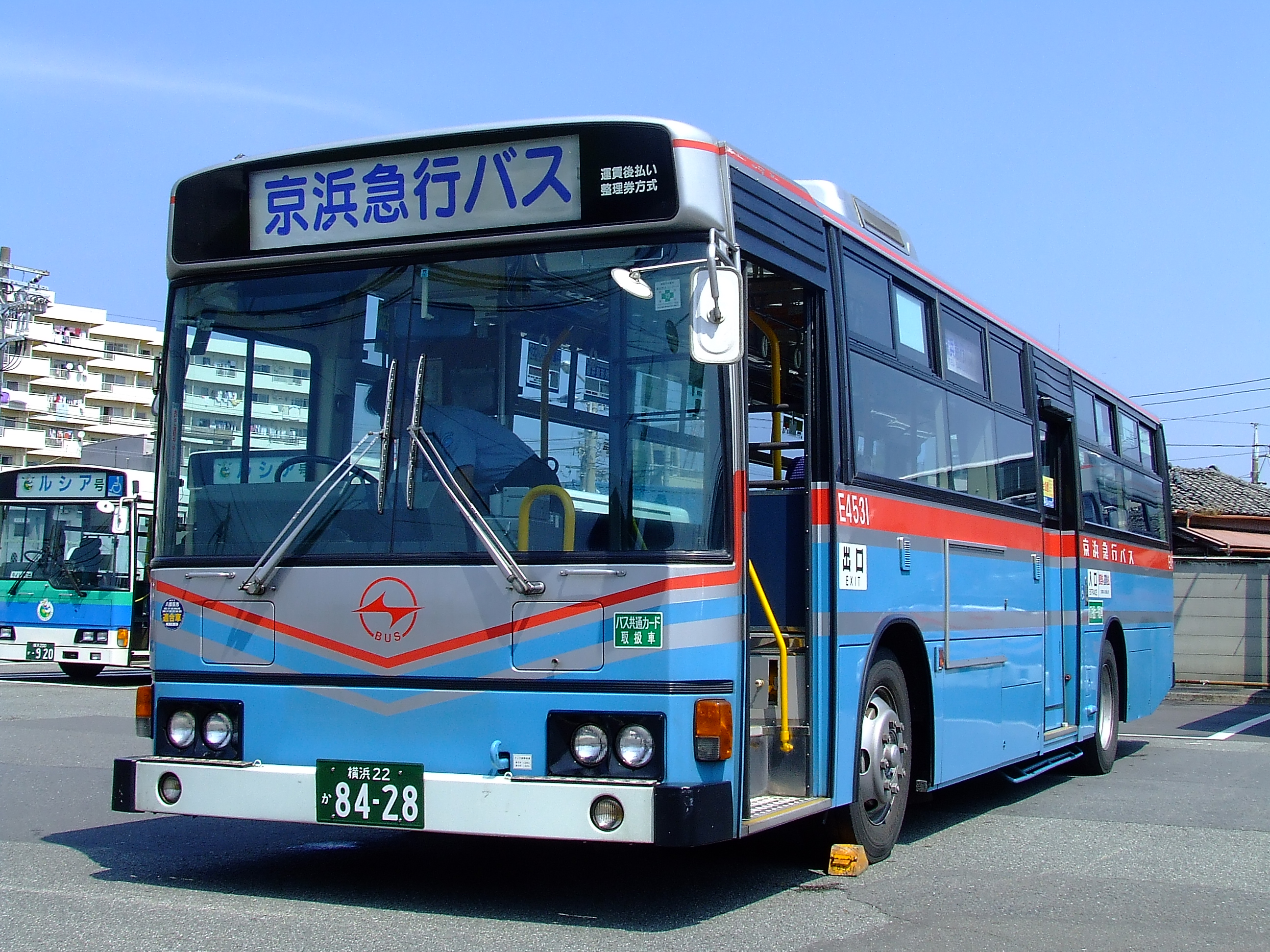
Blue Ribbon One-Step U-HT2MMAAkai

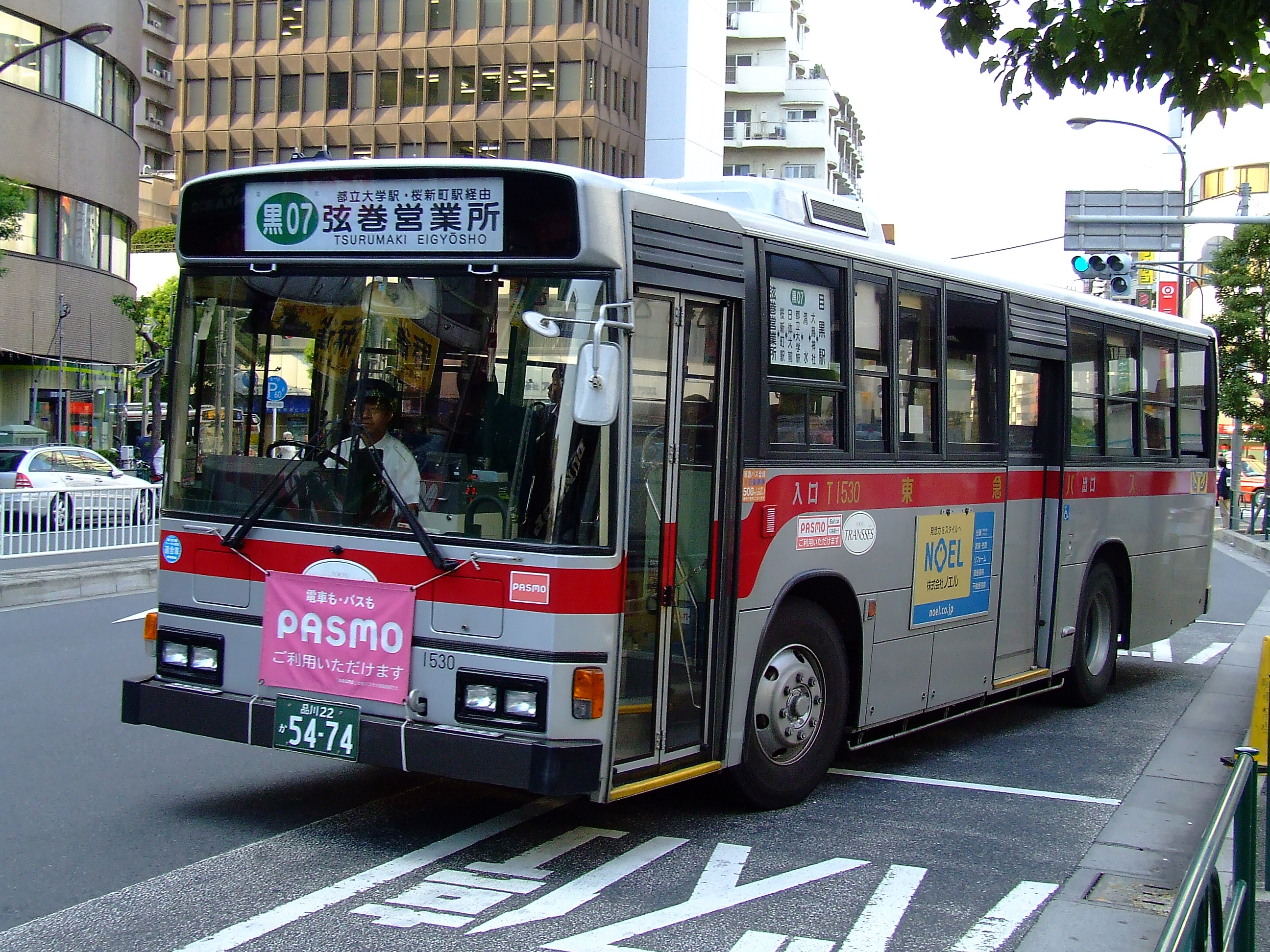
Blue Ribbon KC-HT2MLCA

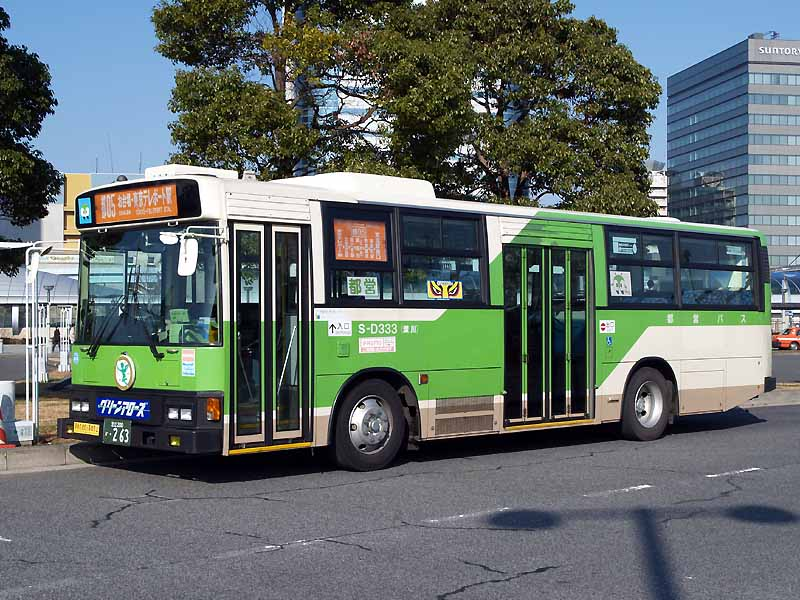
Blue Ribbon KC-HU2MLCA

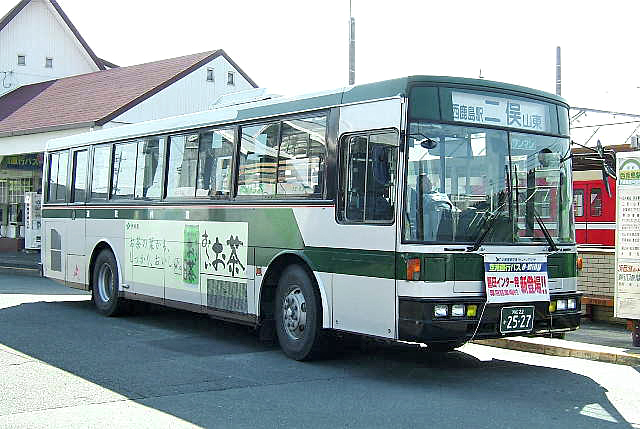
Blue Ribbon (FHI 7E body) U-HT2MMAAkai

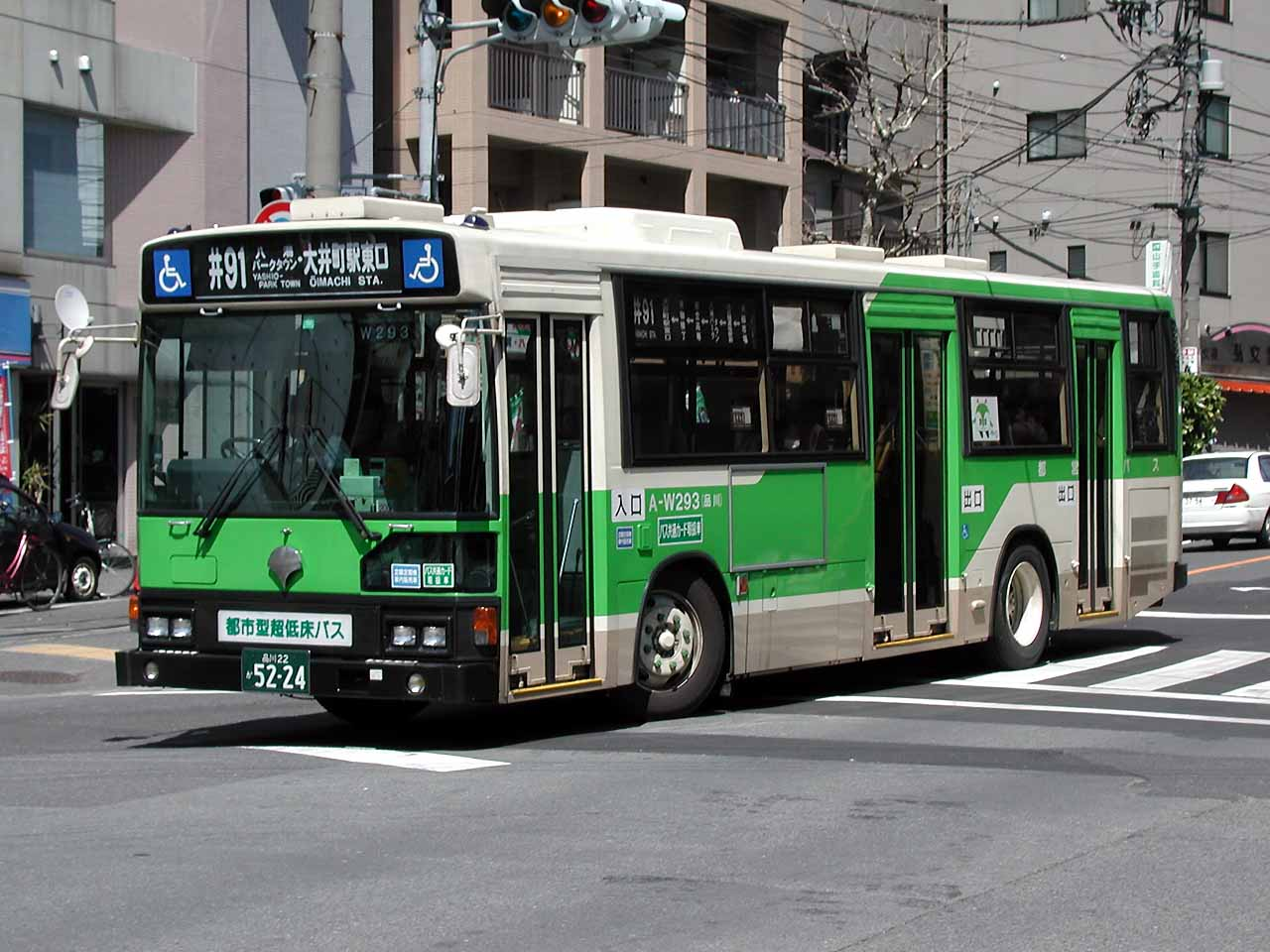
Blue Ribbon HU2ML
(One-step low-floor prototype)

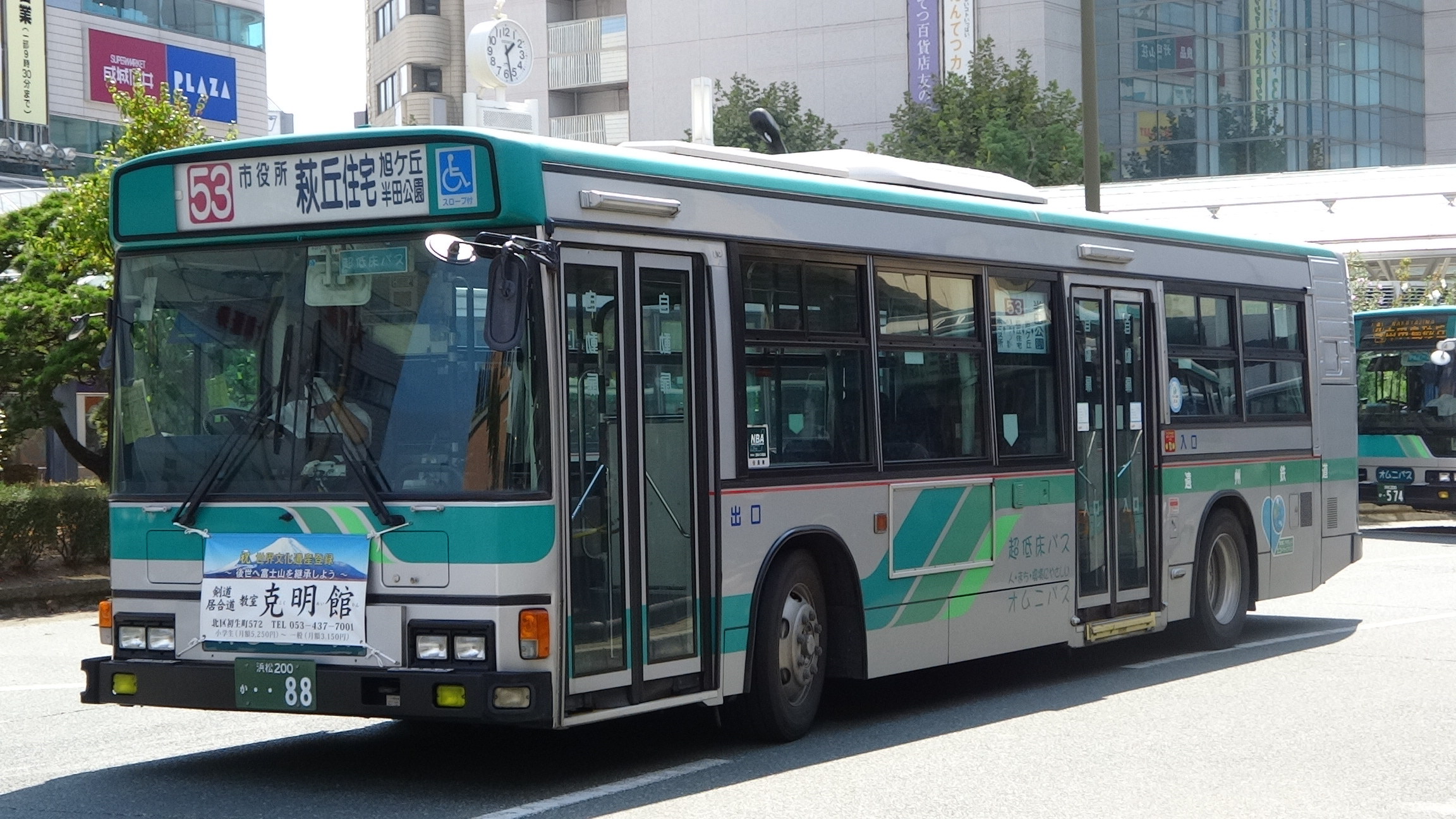
Blue Ribbon KC-HU2PPCE

=== Tourist coaches (1982–1990) ===
- K-RU60/63(1982)
- P-RU60/63(1985)
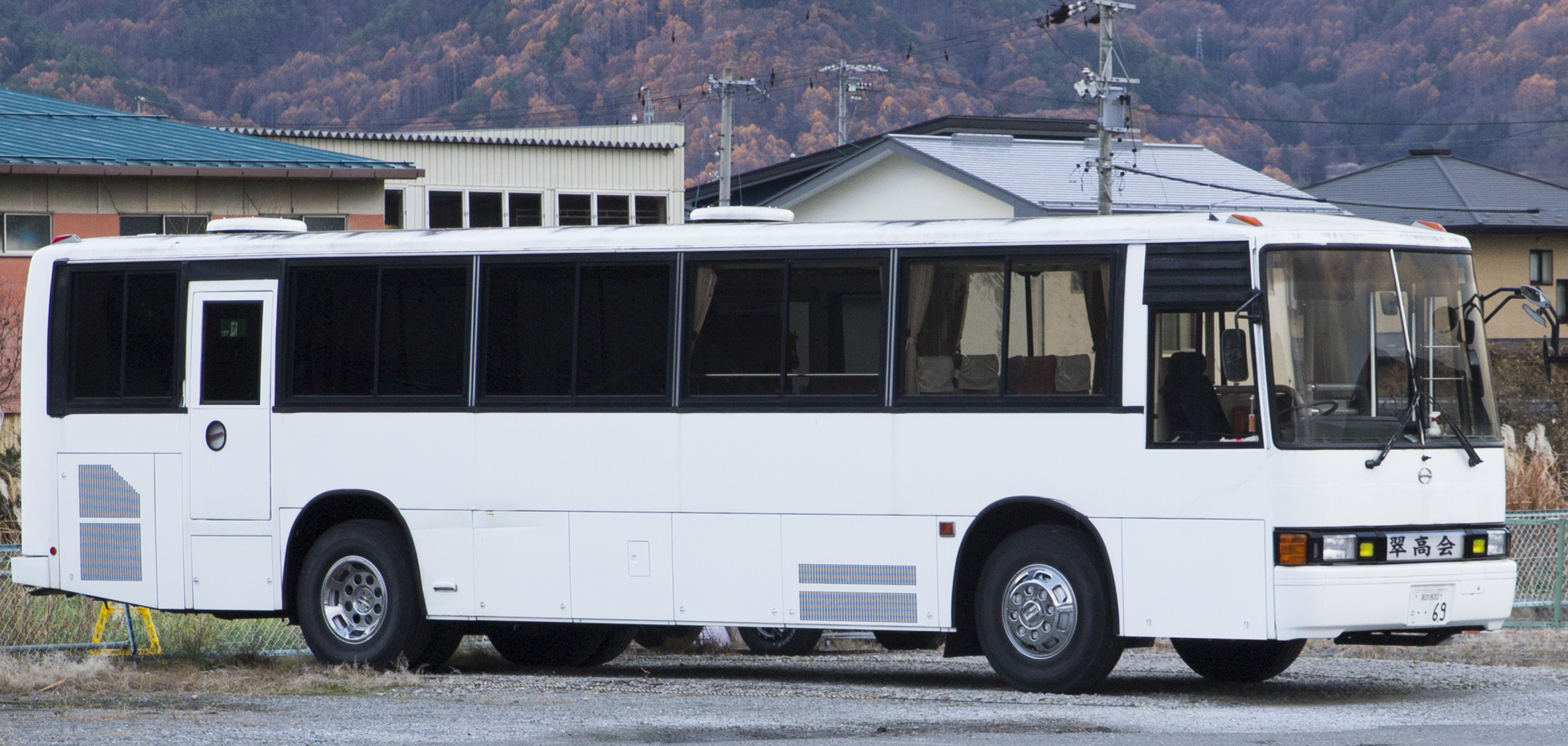
Blue Ribbon
(Tourist coach)

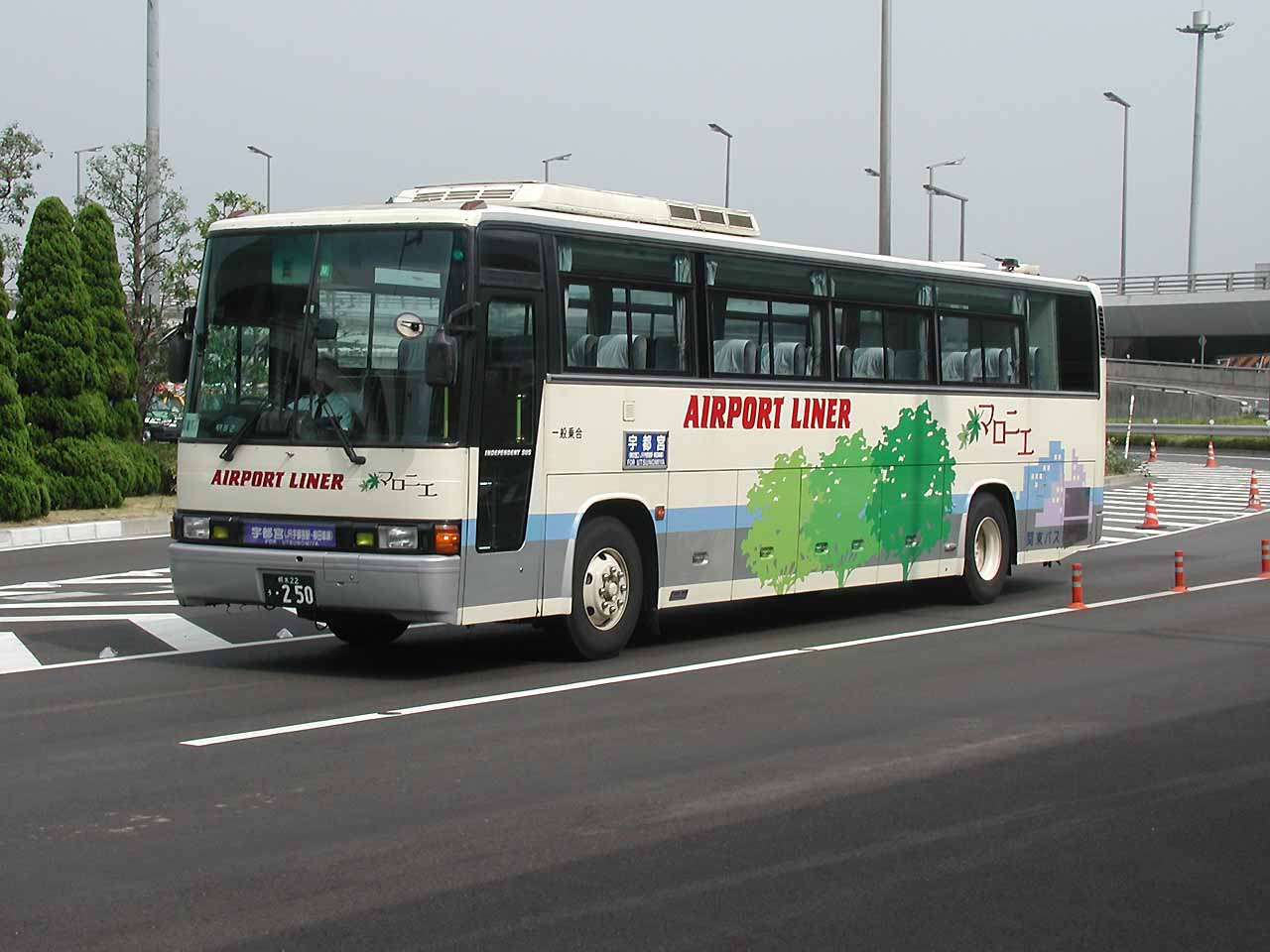
Blue Ribbon
(Tourist coach)
P-RU638BB

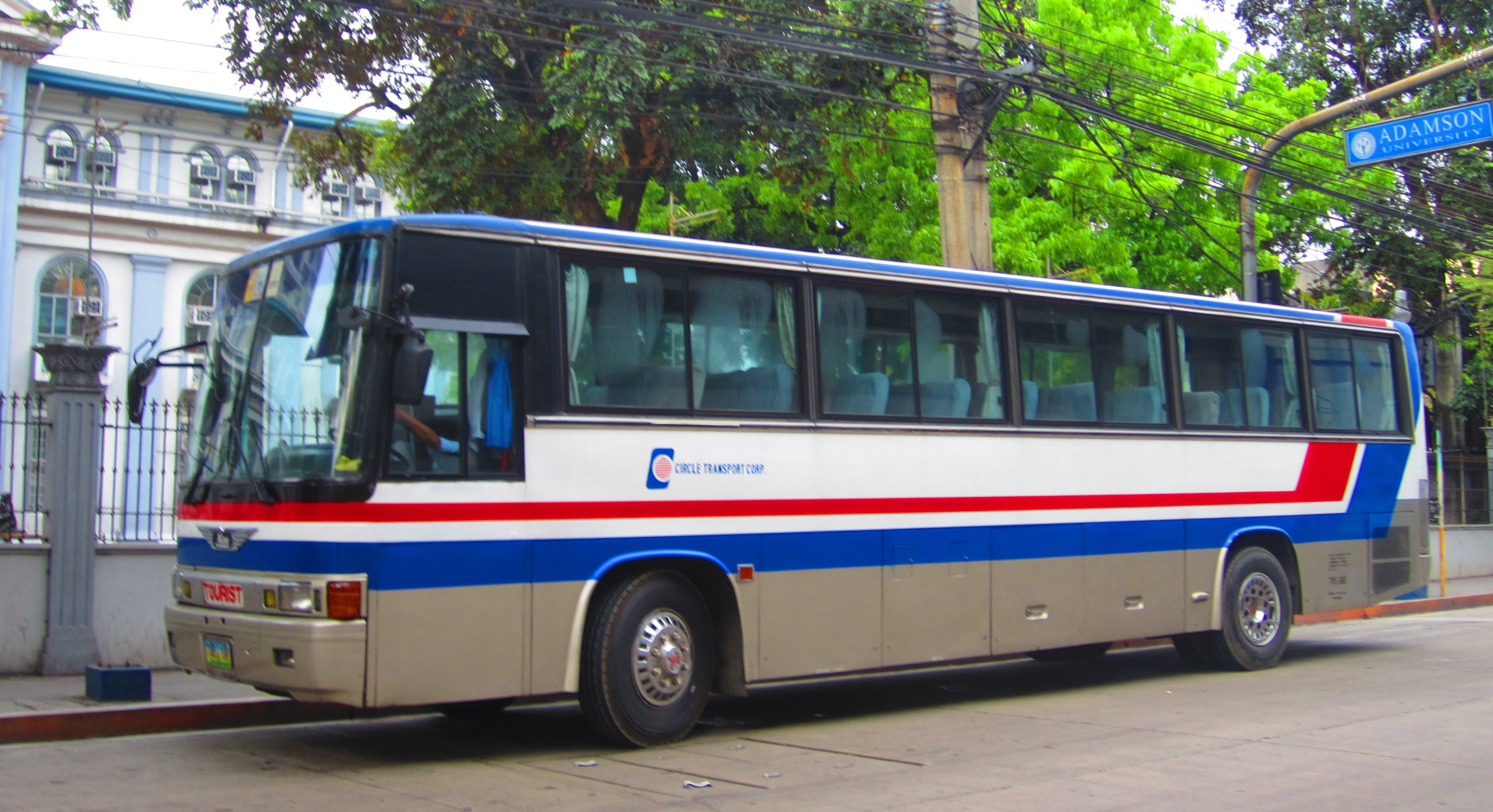
Blue Ribbon in Manila, Philippines
(Tourist coach)
P-RU638BB

=== Blue Ribbon HIMR (1991–2001) ===
The Blue Ribbon HIMR was a hybrid model introduced in 1991. It was equipped with an induction motor and batteries. During acceleration, the motor assisted the engine, while during braking, the motor functioned as an electric retarder, recovering energy and storing it in the batteries.

Model timeline:

- U-HU2MLA (1991)
- U-HU2MLAH (1994)
- KC-RU1JLCH (1995)
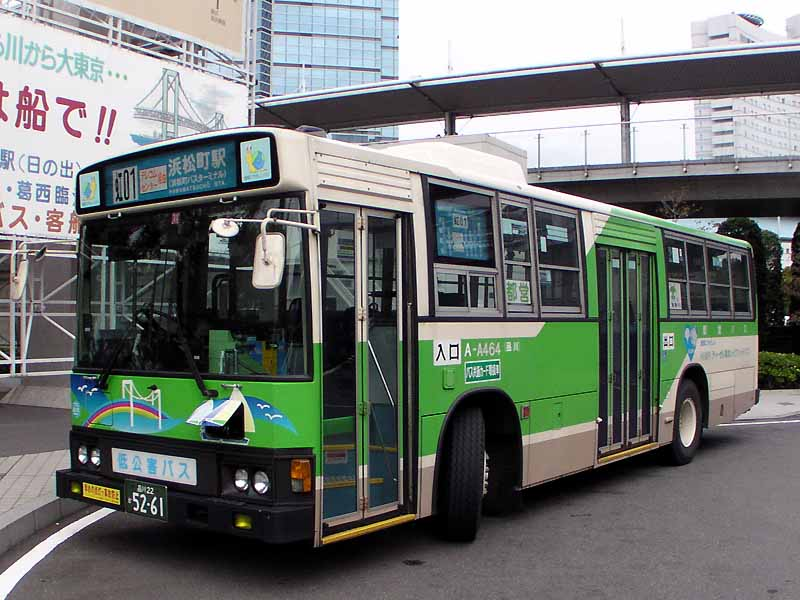
Blue Ribbon "HIMR" U-HU2MLAH

== Blue Ribbon City (2000–2005) ==
- KL-HT/HU2PMEE/PEE/LEA/MEA/REA (2000)
  - Engine: P11C turbocharged diesel (250 PS or 300 PS)
  - Transmission: 5-speed manual or ZF Ecomat (standard or non-step models)
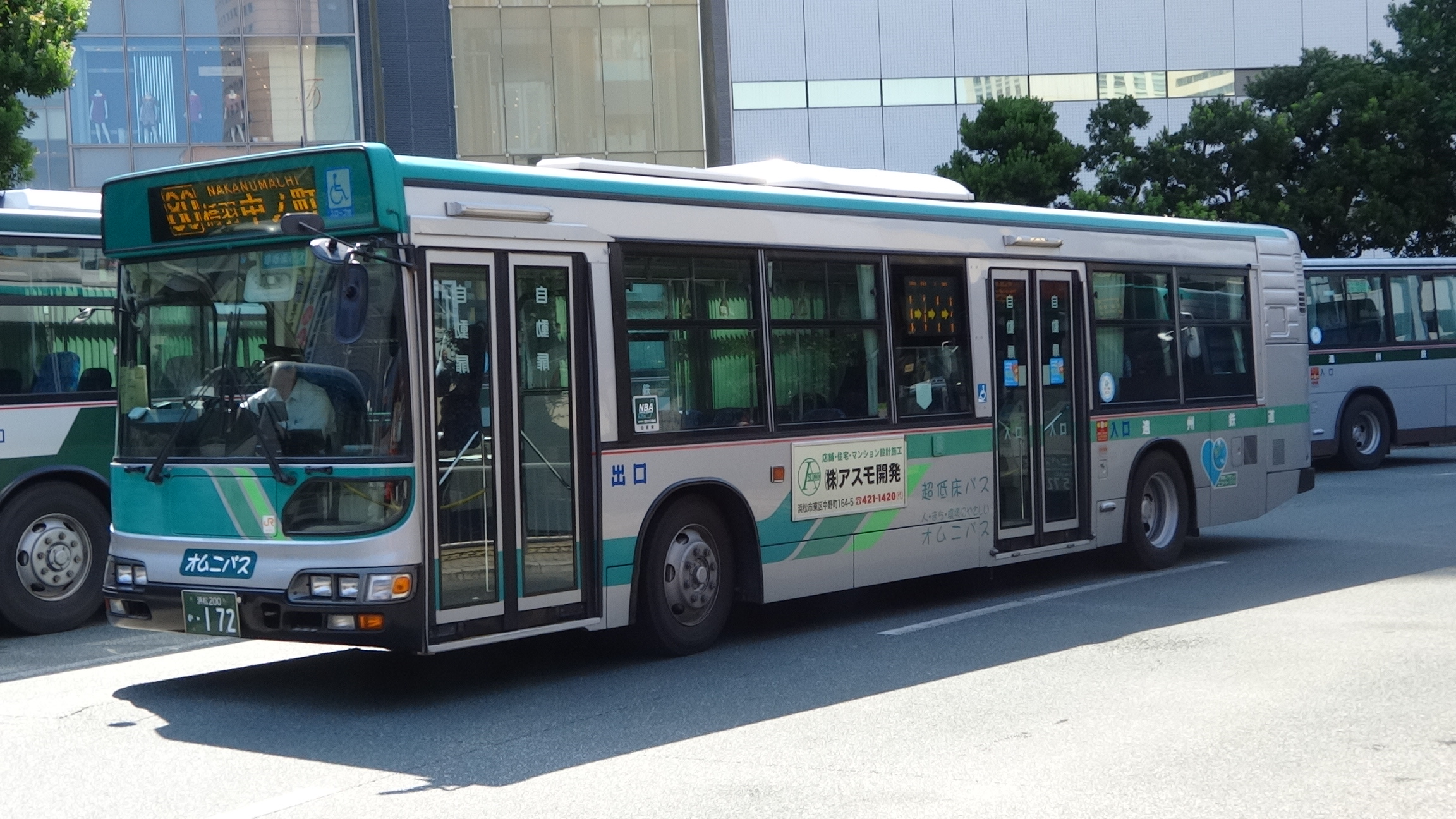
Blue Ribbon City KL-HU2PPEE

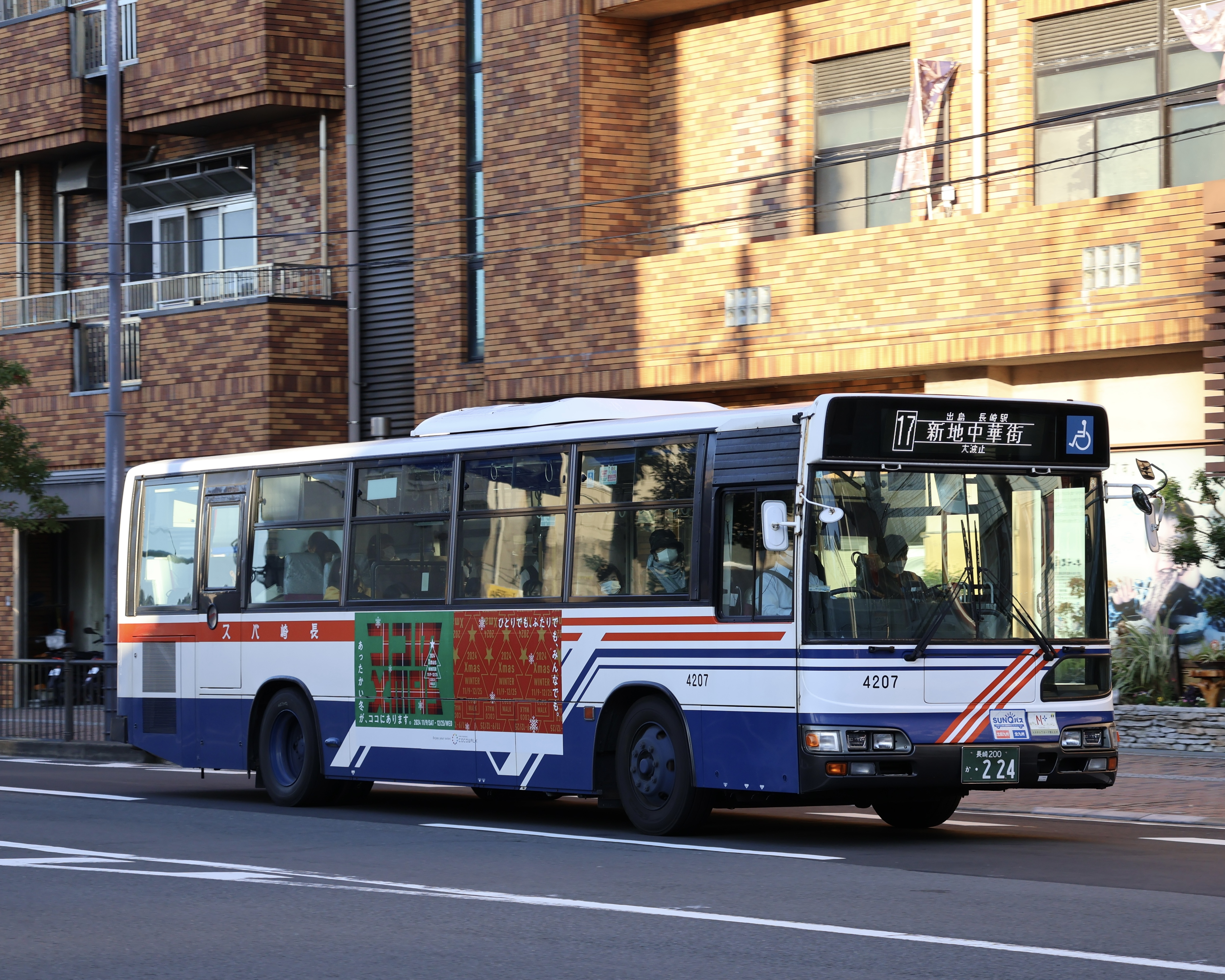
Blue Ribbon City KL-HU2PMEA

=== Blue Ribbon City HIMR (2001–2005) ===
The HIMR version of the Blue Ribbon City was introduced in 2001. The HU1J was a one-step model, with the battery system updated to nickel–metal hydride (Ni-MH).

- HM-HU1JLEP/MEP (2001)
  - Engine: J08C turbocharged diesel (177 kW / 240 PS) with motor assistance
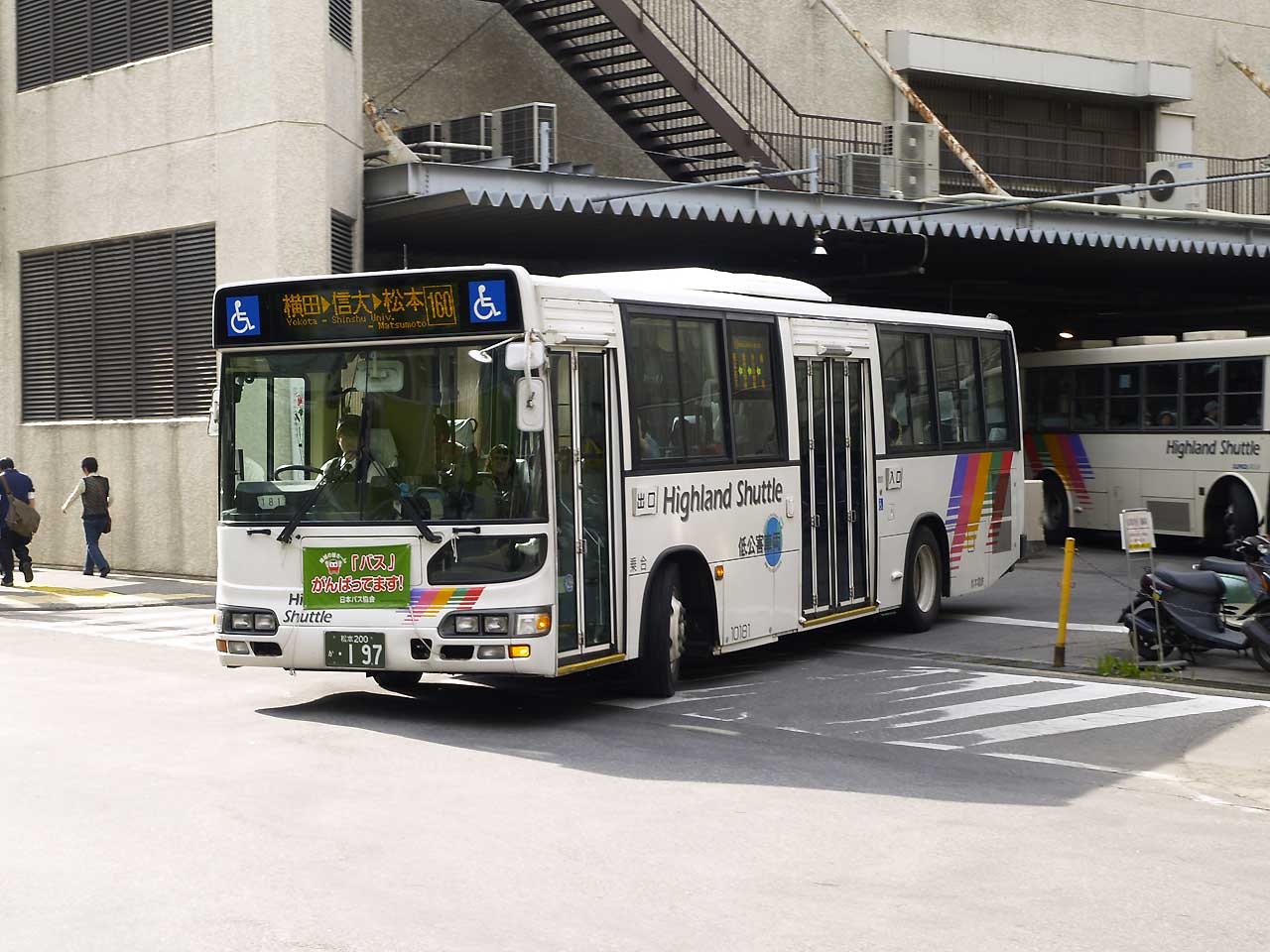
Blue Ribbon City HIMR HM-HU1JMEP

=== Blue Ribbon City Hybrid (2005–2015) ===
The Blue Ribbon City Hybrid was the only hybrid electric city bus produced by Hino Motors during this period. Most units were built on full-length chassis, with some produced on medium-length chassis. The HU8J was a non-step model, equipped with four Toyota Prius Ni-MH batteries mounted on the roof.

- ACG-HU8JLFP/MFP (2005)
- BJG-HU8JLFP/MFP (2007)
  - Engine: J08E-1M turbocharged diesel (177 kW / 240 PS) with motor assistance
- LJG-HU8JLGP/MGP (2010)
- LNG-HU8JLGP/MGP (2012)
  - Engine: J08E-1M turbocharged diesel (206 kW / 280 PS) with motor assistance
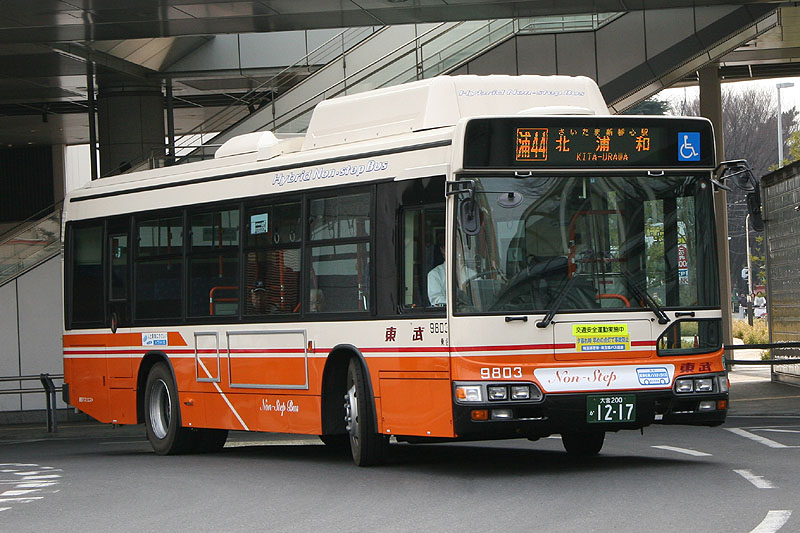
Blue Ribbon City Hybrid ACG-HU8JLFP

=== FCHV-BUS (2002–2005) ===
The Toyota FCHV-BUS was Japan's first fuel cell bus, based on the Hino KL-HU2PMEE chassis.

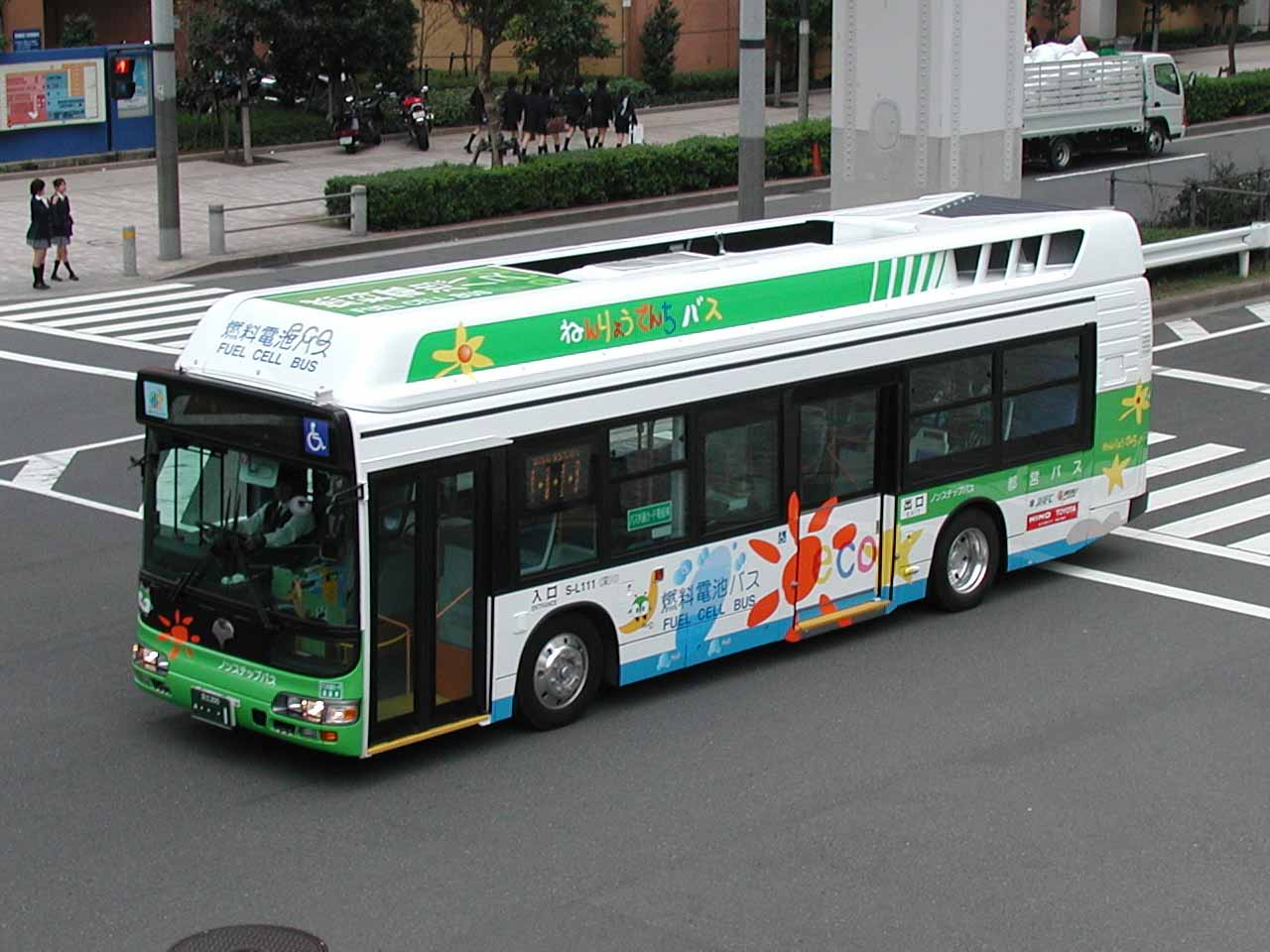
FCHV-BUS (Version 2002)

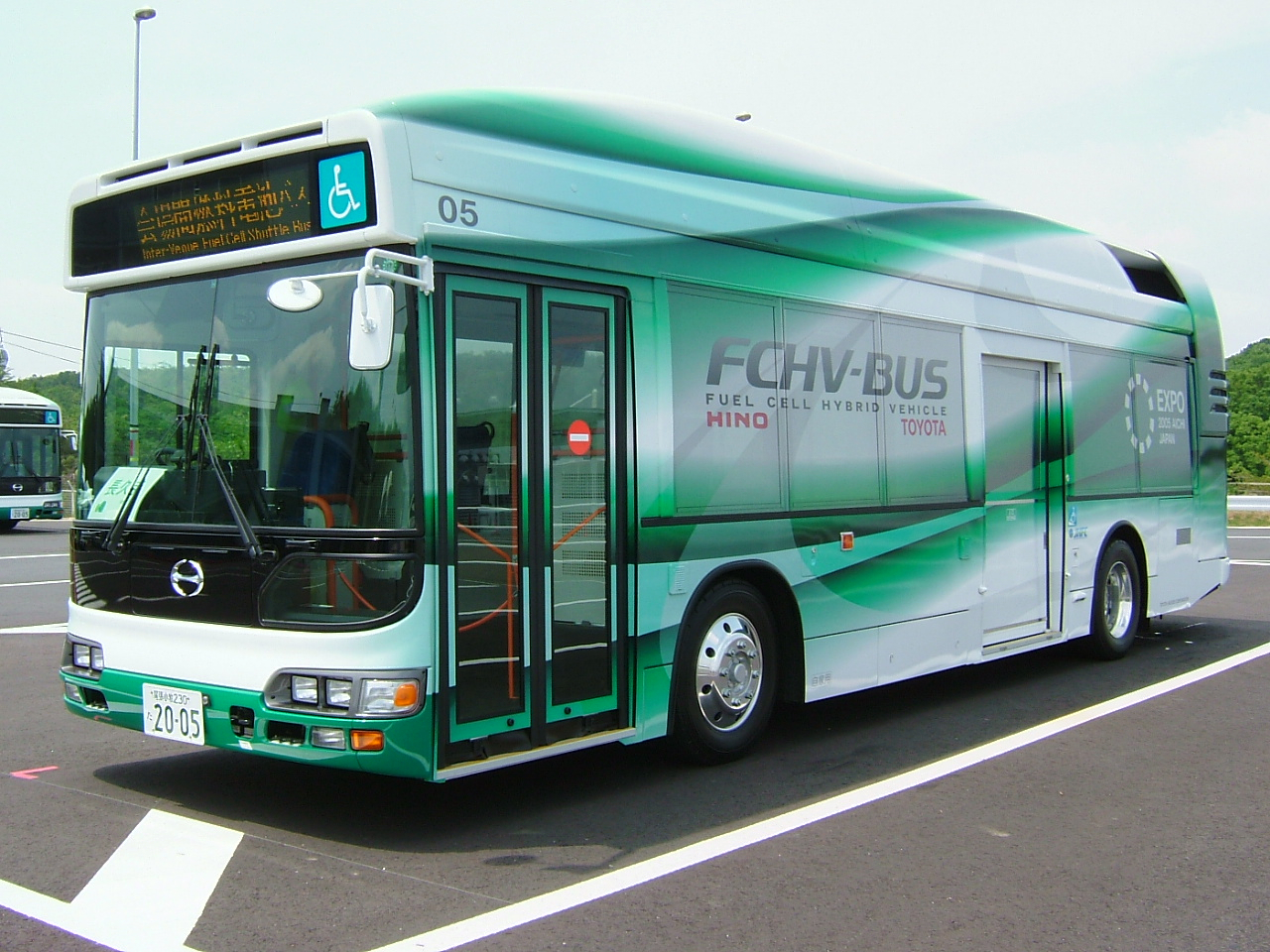
FCHV-BUS (Version 2005)

== Blue Ribbon II (2004–2015) ==
The Hino Blue Ribbon II is a rebadged version of the Isuzu Erga. It features a rounded roof dome similar to the Hino Rainbow II, a double-curvature windscreen, and a separately mounted destination blind.

Model timeline:

- KL-KV280L1/N1 (2004)
- PJ-KV234L1/N1/Q1 (2004)
- PDG/PKG-KV234L2/N2/Q2 (2007)
- LKG/LDG-KV234L3/N3/Q3 (2010)
- QPG/QKG/QDG-KV234L3/N3/Q3 (2012)
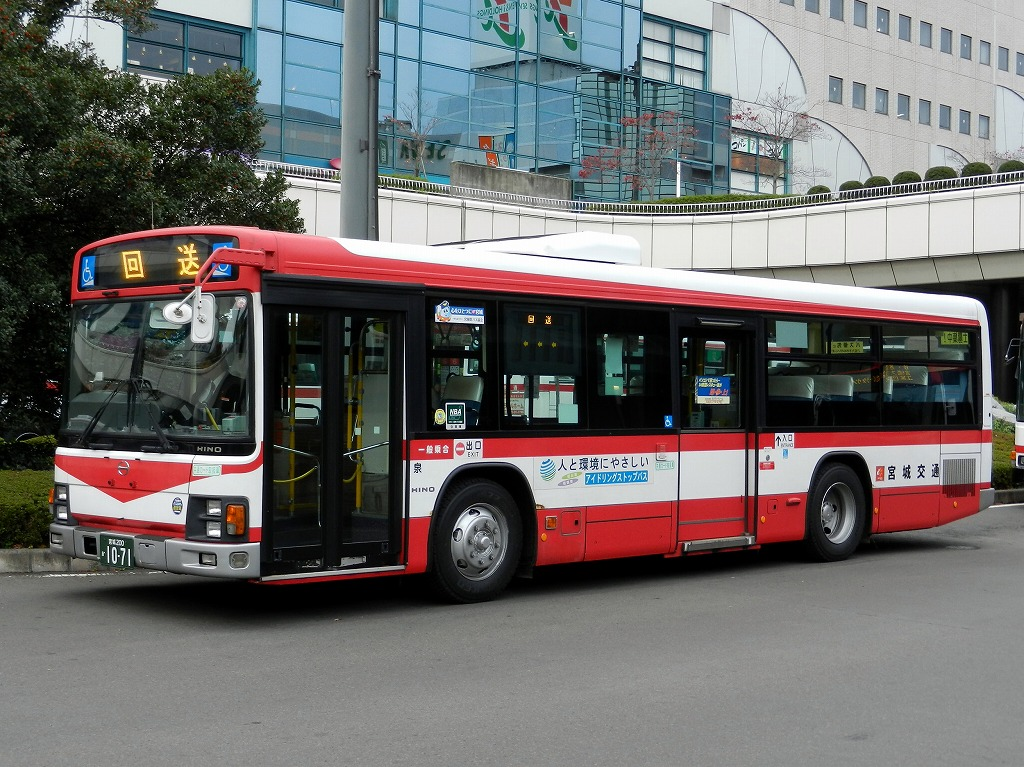
Blue Ribbon II
KL-KV280L1

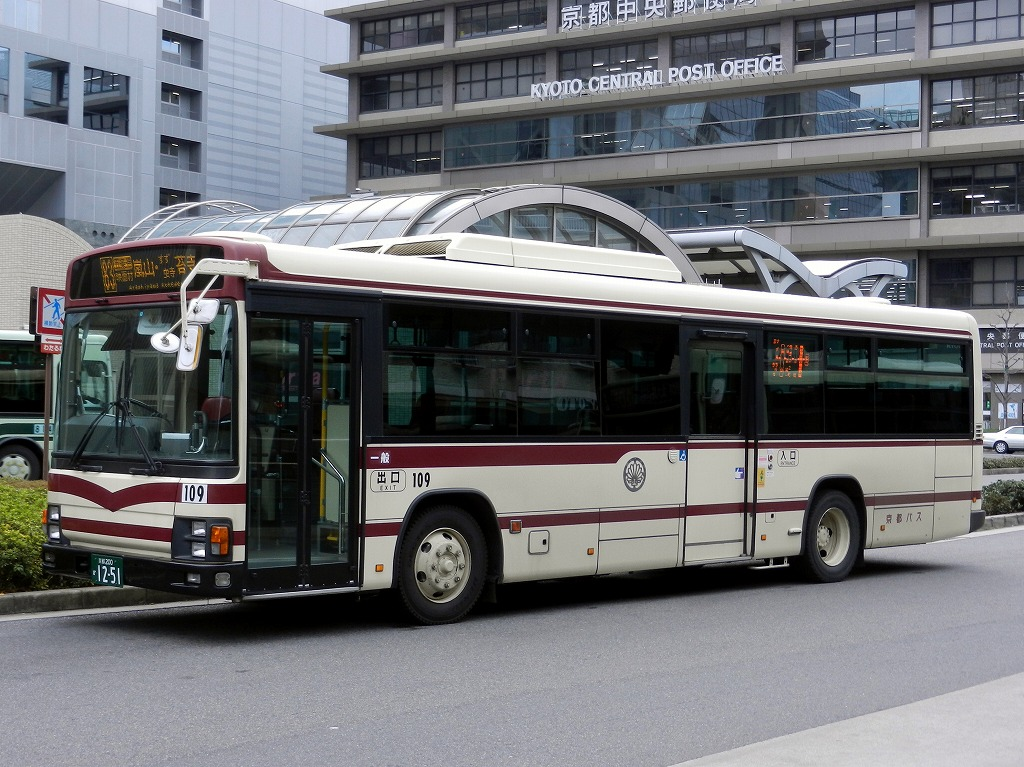
Blue Ribbon II
PJ-KV234N1

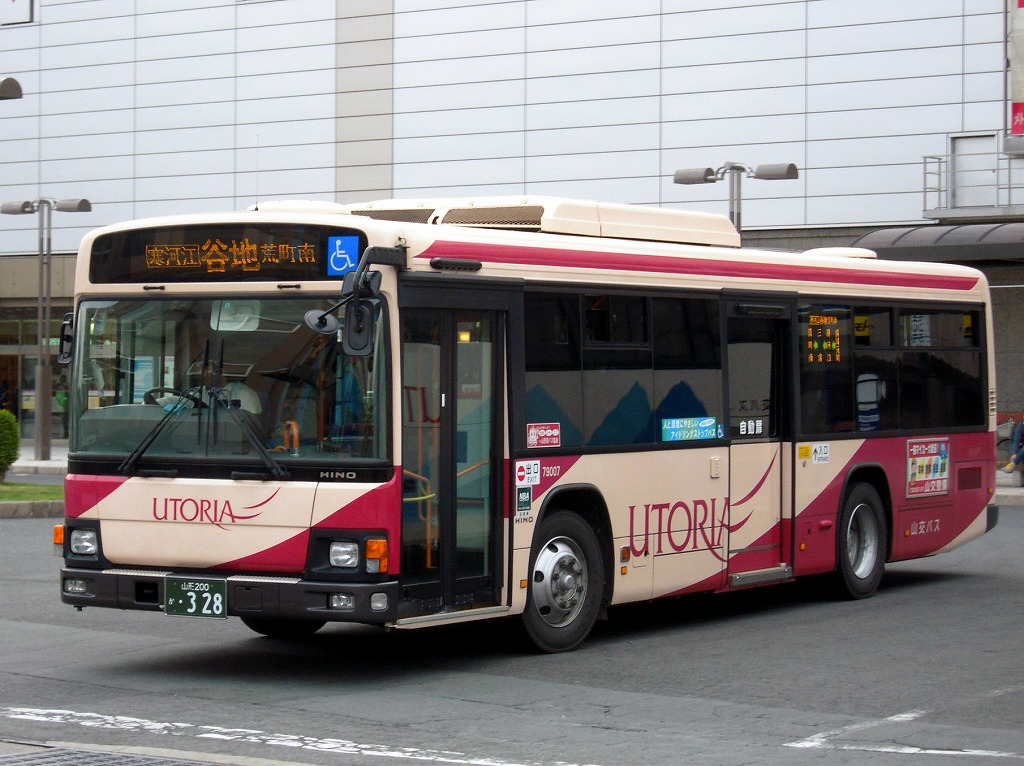
Blue Ribbon II
PKG-KV234L2

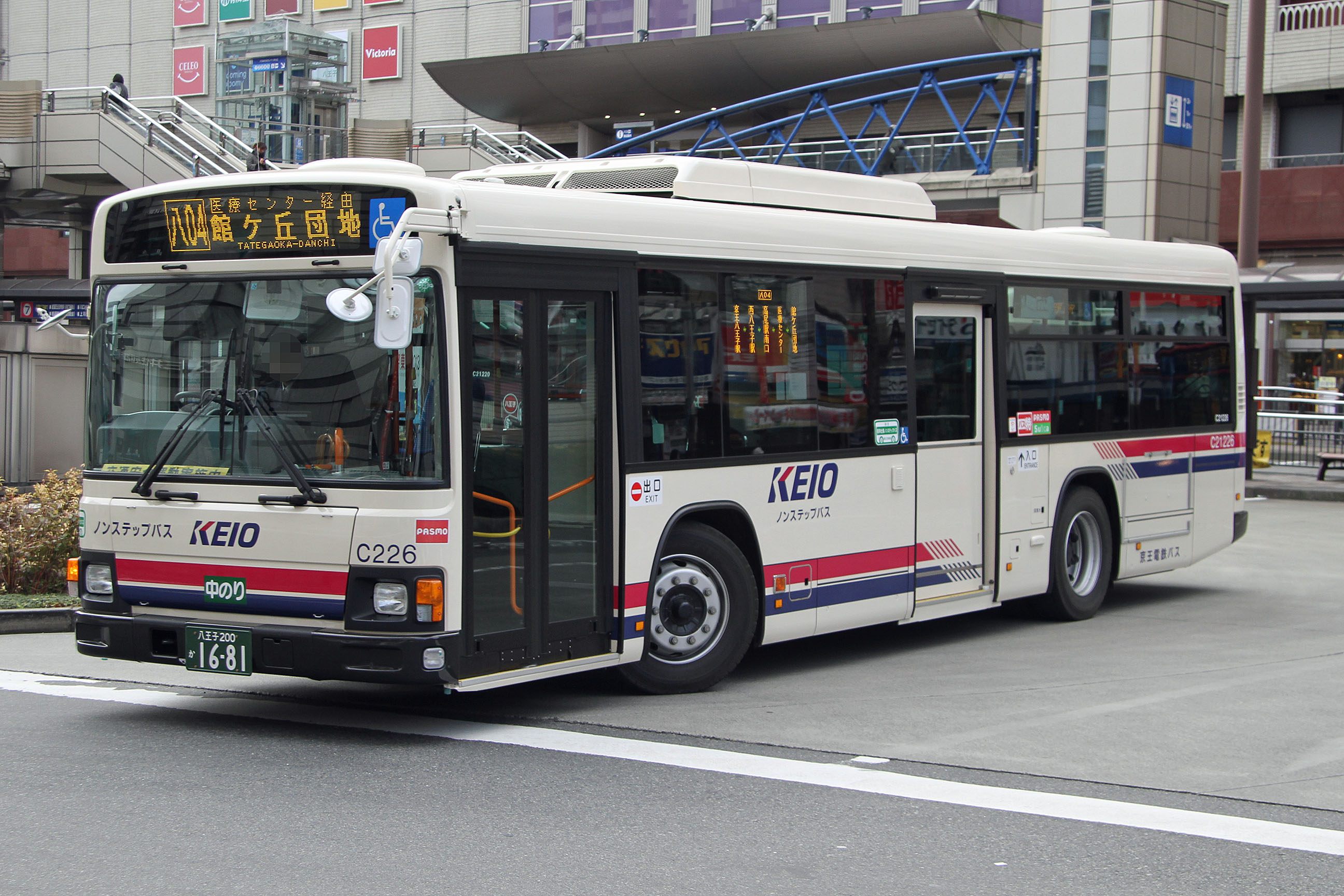
Blue Ribbon II
QPG-KV234L3

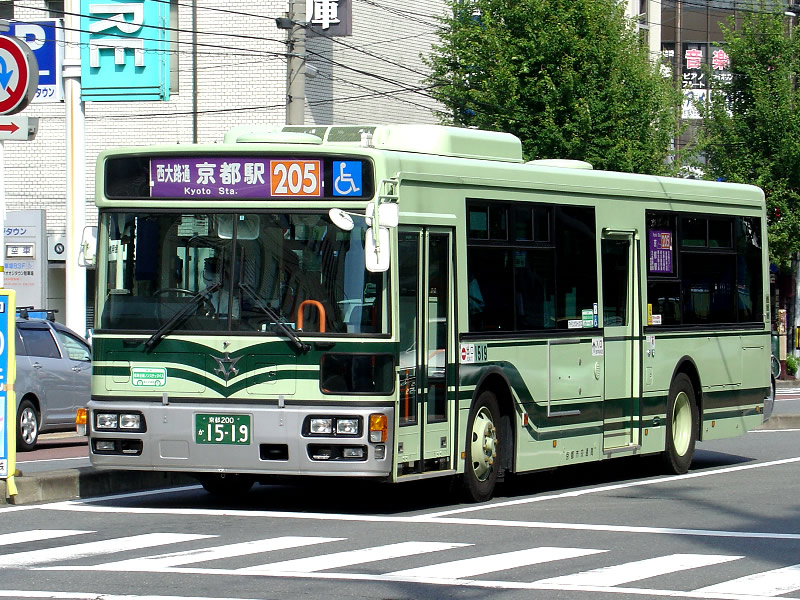
Blue Ribbon II (NSK 96MC body)
PJ-KV234N1

== Blue Ribbon (2015–present) ==
The Blue Ribbon name was reintroduced in 2015. Model timeline:

- QRG/QPG/QKG/QDG-KV290N1/Q1 (2015)
  - Engine: 4HK1 turbocharged diesel, 184 kW (250 PS)
- 2TG/2PG/2KG/2DG-KV290N2/Q2 (2017)
  - Engine: 4HK1 turbocharged diesel, 177 kW (240 PS)
- 2TG/2PG/2KG/2DG-KV290N3/Q3 (2020)
  - Engine: 4HK1 turbocharged diesel, 177 kW (240 PS)
- 2TG/2PG/2KG/2DG-KV290N4/Q4 (2023)
  - Engine: 4HK1 turbocharged diesel, 177 kW (240 PS)
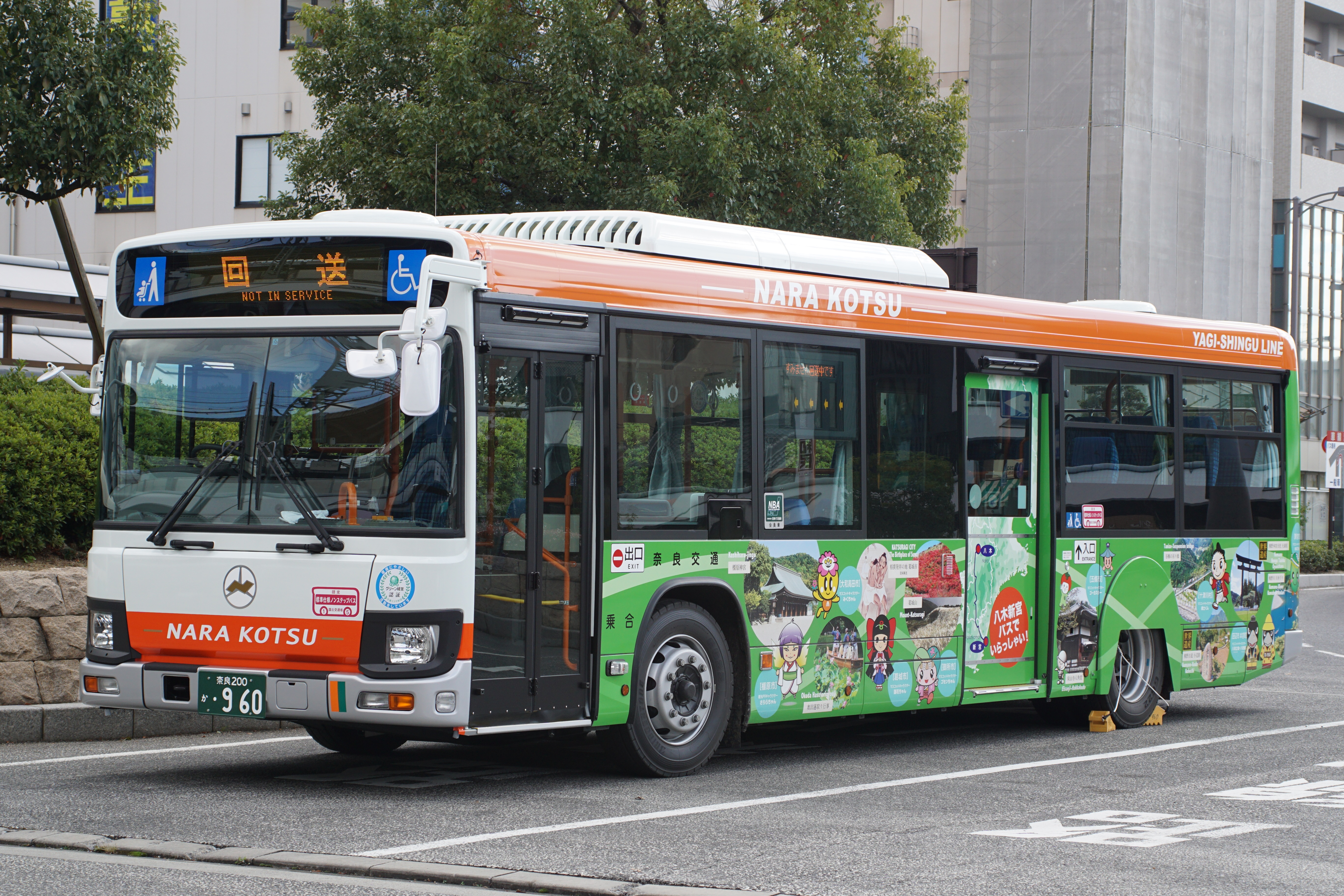
Blue Ribbon QDG-KV290N1

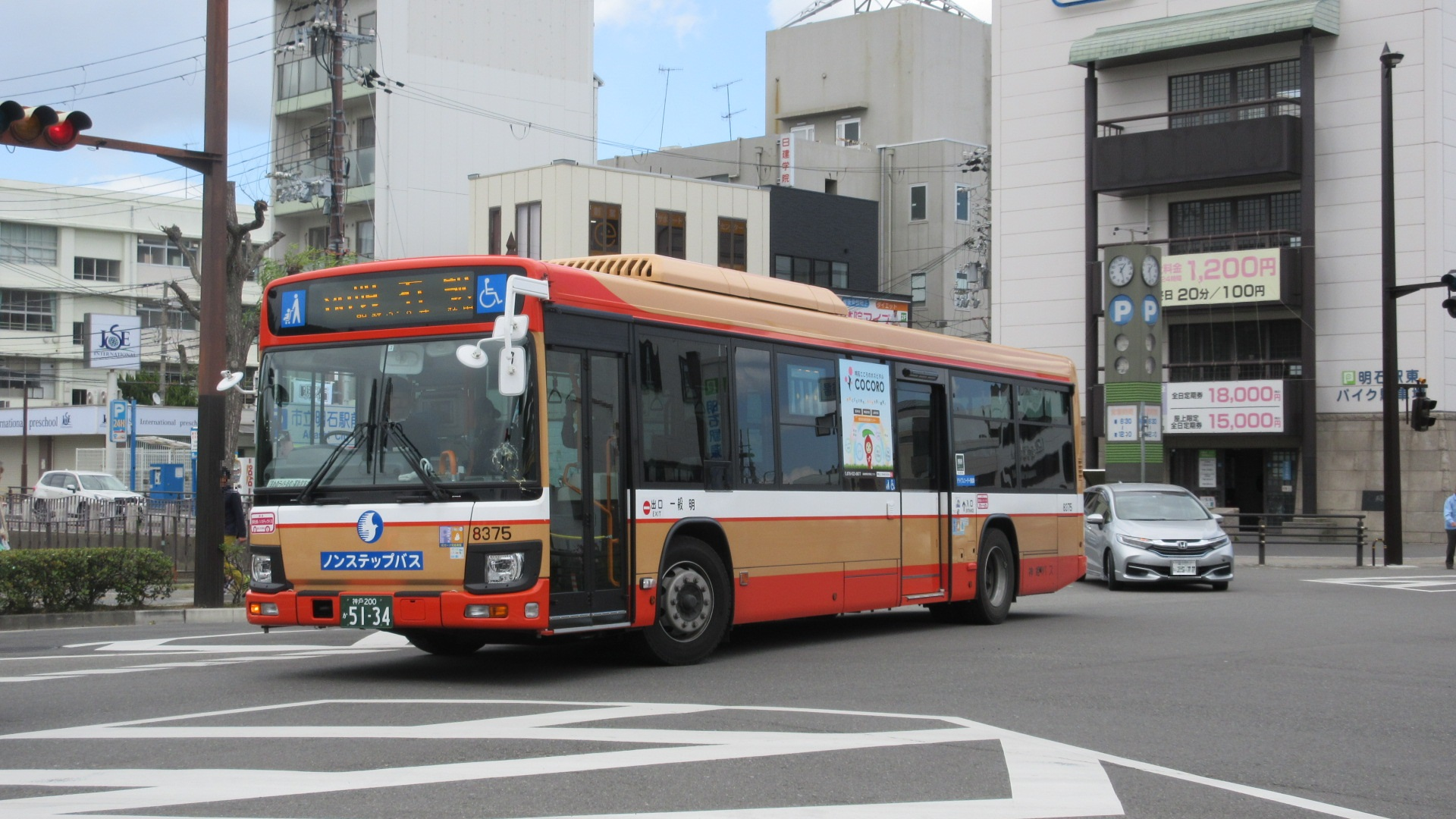
Blue Ribbon 2PG-KV290Q2

=== Blue Ribbon Hybrid (2015–present) ===
The Blue Ribbon Hybrid has been produced at Hino's Utsunomiya Works since 2015. Model timeline:

- QSG-HL2ANAP/ASAP (2015)
  - Engine: A05C turbocharged diesel, 184 kW (250 PS) with motor assistance
- 2SG-HL2ANBP/ASBP (2017)
  - Engine: A05C turbocharged diesel, 191 kW (260 PS) with motor assistance
- 2SG-HL2ANBP/ASBP (2019)
  - Engine: A05C turbocharged diesel, 191 kW (260 PS) with motor assistance (EDSS added)
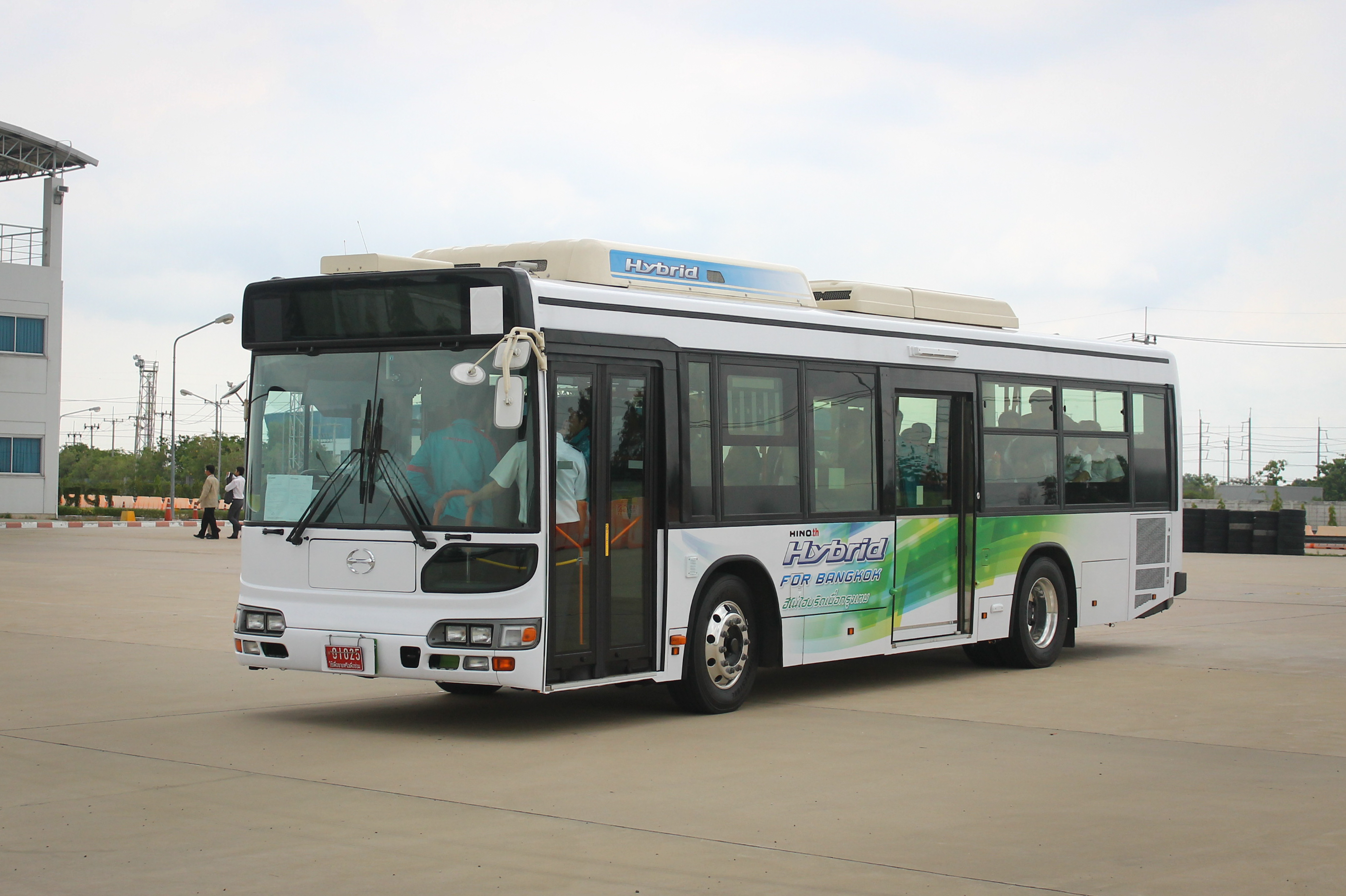
Blue Ribbon Hybrid Test Model (The body is based on Blue Ribbon City)
HU8JLGP(kai)

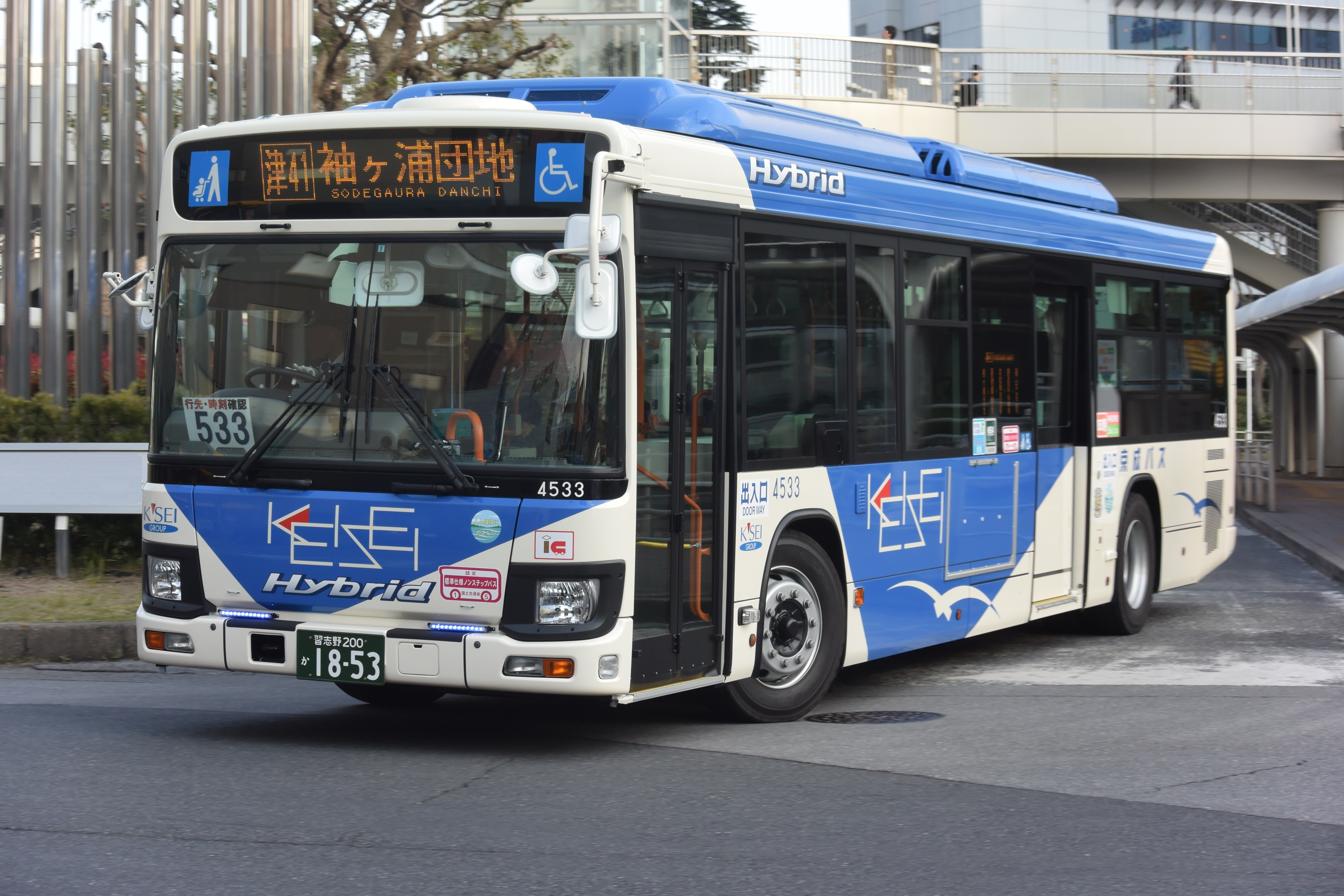
Blue Ribbon Hybrid
QSG-HL2ASAP

== Blue Ribbon Hybrid Articulated ==
The Blue Ribbon Hybrid Articulated bus was launched on May 27, 2019, alongside the Isuzu Erga Duo. Its hybrid system is the same as that used in the HL series.

The model designation is LX525Z1. It was the first bus in the world to be equipped with the Emergency Driving Stop System (EDSS). The bus is powered by an A09C 6-cylinder engine producing 360 hp at 1,800 rpm, paired with a Hino 7-speed automated manual transmission (7AMT). As its gross vehicle weight exceeds 20 tonnes, the model is fitted with this heavy-duty drivetrain.

Like the Erga Duo, the Blue Ribbon Hybrid Articulated is the only domestically produced large bus in Japan equipped with disc brakes on all wheels.

On February 5, 2020, the first units were delivered to Yokohama City, operated by the Yokohama City Transportation Bureau under the service name Bayside Blue. This delivery marked the first domestically manufactured articulated bus in Japan.

On August 2, 2022, shipments were suspended—along with the Erga Hybrid—under the guidance of the Ministry of Land, Infrastructure, Transport and Tourism due to Hino Motors' engine data falsification scandal.

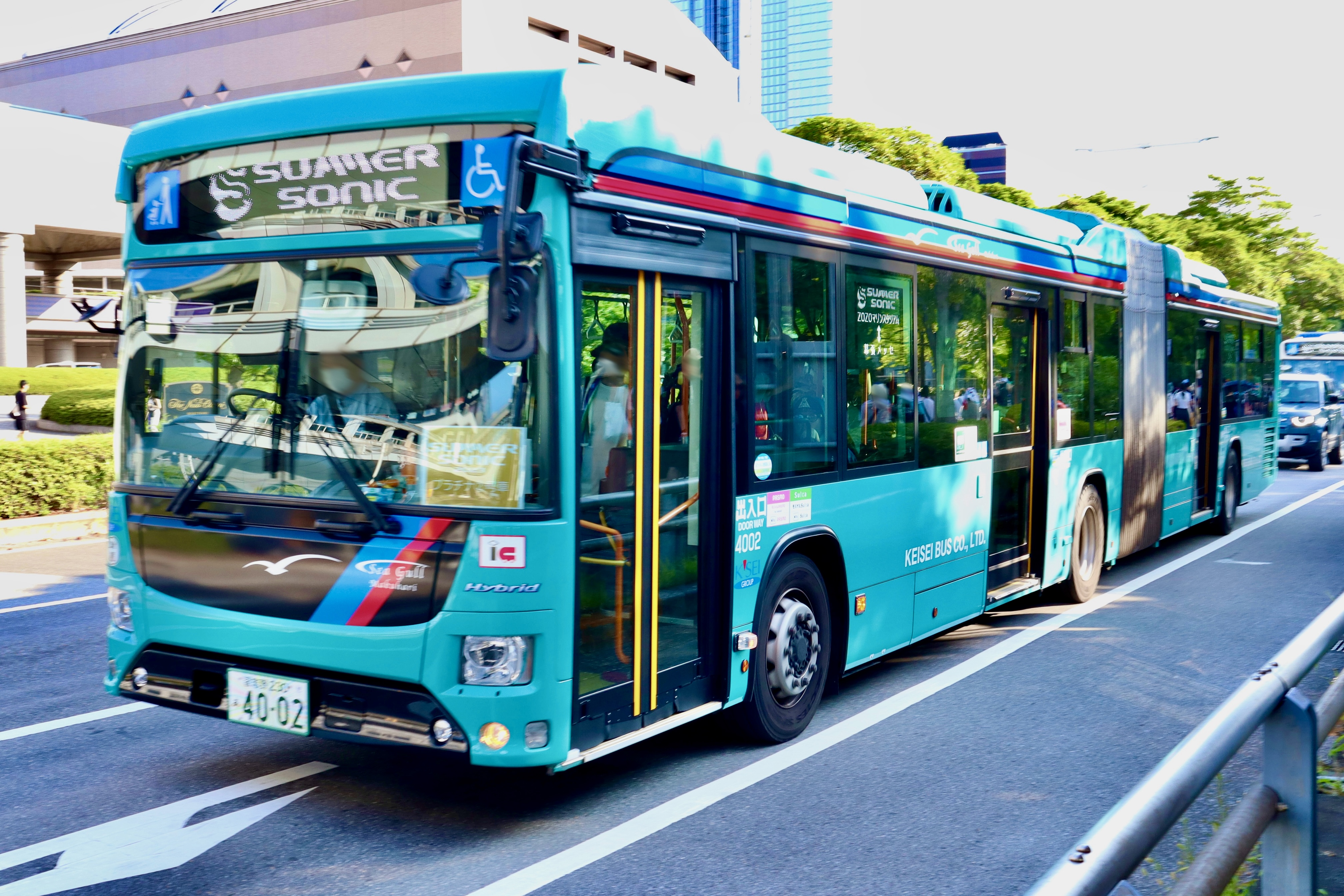
Blue Ribbon Hybrid Articulated KX525Z1

== Shinjin RC420TP ==
Shinjin RC420TP

Overview
- Manufacturer: Shinjin Motors
- Production: February 1971 - June 1972
- Assembly: Busanjin, Busan, South Korea

Body and chassis
- Class: Express Bus
- Related: Hino Blue Ribbon RC Series

Powertrain
- Engine: Hino DK20-T Turbo-Diesel 260 PS

Dimensions
- Wheelbase: 5.67 m
- Length: 11.1 m
- Width: 2.49 m

Chronology
- Successor: GMK BU110

Shinjin RC420TP was a rear-engined, high-speed express bus manufactured under licence from the Hino Blue Ribbon RC Series. It was produced by Shinjin Motors in Busan, South Korea, between February 1971 and June 1972.

=== History ===
The RC420TP was introduced in February 1971 as part of Shinjin's express bus line. It used the body design of the Hino RC300P series but was built on the longer RC320P chassis. The model was equipped with Hino's DK20-T turbo-diesel engine.

Production ended in June 1972, with only 67 units completed before Shinjin Motors was taken over by General Motors Korea. A variant, the RC420 sub-series, was also produced with a leaf spring suspension system.

External images
- Shinjin RC420TP - driver side
- Shinjin RC420TP - passenger side
- Larger picture of Shinjin RC020

== See also ==
- Shinjin Motor (1955~1971) section at Daewoo Bus
- Buses section at Shinjin Motors
- List of buses
- Isuzu Erga, the J-bus product that look almost the same
- Mitsubishi Fuso Aero Star, its main competitor
