= Daewoo (disambiguation) =

Daewoo is the Korean word for "Great Universe" and may refer to:

- Daewoo, a former South Korean conglomerate (chaebol) containing the following divisions:
  - Daewoo Motors
    - Daewoo Automotive Components Co. Ltd.
    - Daewoo Bus Co., Ltd.
    - Daewoo Commercial Vehicle Co. Ltd.
    - Tata Daewoo Commercial Vehicle
  - Daewoo Motor Sales
    - GM Daewoo
    - Architectural Iaan Div.
    - SAA-Seoul Auto Auction
  - Daewoo Electronics
    - Daewoo Electronic Components Co. Ltd.
    - Daewoo Electric Motor Industries Ltd.
    - Orion Electric Co. Ltd.
  - Daewoo Precision Industries
    - S&T Daewoo Co. Ltd.
  - Daewoo Textile Co. Ltd.
  - Daewoo Heavy Industries (DHI)
  - Daewoo Shipbuilding & Marine Engineering (DSME)
  - Daewoo Securities
  - Daewoo Telecom Ltd.
    - Daewoo Information Systems Co. Ltd.
  - Daewoo Corporation
    - Daewoo Construction
    - Keangnam Enterprises
  - Daewoo International
  - Daewoo Development Co. Ltd.
    - Daewoo Hotels
  - Institute for Advanced Engineering

- Automobile Craiova, also known as Daewoo Automobile Romania
- UzDaewooAvto, also known as Daewoo Automobile in Uzbekistan
- Daewoo Express or Sammi Daewoo Express is an inter-city common carrier of passengers by bus serving over 30 destinations in Pakistan.
