= Daewoo dissolution and corruption scandal =

1999–2006 South Korean economic event

The Daewoo dissolution and corruption scandal was a 1999–2006 scandal in South Korea involving the bankruptcy of Daewoo, then the country's second largest company, and a subsequent corruption investigation, involving arrests, escapes and eventual conviction of dozens of company's top executives. The resulting scandal has been described as one of the biggest scandals in South Korea.

== Background ==
Daewoo was a major South Korean conglomerate. Prior to the 1997 Asian financial crisis, Daewoo was the second largest conglomerate in Korea. By 1999, Daewoo went bankrupt, with debts of about US$50-80 billion.

== Corruption scandal ==
Soon after the demise, South Korean prosecutors filed charges against over 40 top executives, in what BBC described as the Daewoo corruption scandal. This was related to the discovery that company's auditors concealed the amount of debt, and that bribes of about 470 billion won were involved (close to US$400 million). Loss from bribery and corruption has been estimated to over US$1 billion.

Daewoo Chairman Kim Woo-choong fled to Vietnam, and former Daewoo factory workers put up "Wanted" posters with his picture. Kim returned to Korea in June 2005 and was promptly arrested. He was charged with masterminding accounting fraud of 41 trillion won (US$43.4 billion), illegally borrowing 9.8 trillion won (US$10.3 billion), and smuggling US$3.2 billion out of the country. On 30 May 2006, Kim was sentenced to 10 years in prison after being convicted of fraud and embezzlement. On the last day of the trial, Kim tearfully addressed the court, "I cannot dodge my responsibility of wrongly buttoning up the final button of fate." On 30 December 2007, Kim was granted amnesty by President Roh Moo-hyun.

== See also ==
- Daewoo Shipbuilding & Marine Engineering (involved in a 2016 corruption scandal)
