= Daewoo Motor Sales =

South Korean auto sales company

Zyle motors
- logo of Zyle Motors
- Industry: Automotive
- Founded: 1966; 60 years ago
- Headquarters: Seoul, South Korea
- Products: vehicles
- Services: Auto sales
- Website: dm.co.kr

Zyle Motors (Korean: 자일자동차) was an auto sales company established in 1966 and headquartered in Seoul, South Korea. It operated car dealerships in South Korea that sold vehicles manufactured by Daewoo Motors, and its successors and partners. It was the largest motor sales company in Korea.

== History ==
Daewoo Motor Sales began as the sales division of Daewoo Motors. In January 1993, Daewoo Motor Sales Co., Ltd. was established as a subsidiary of Daewoo Motors within the Daewoo Group. Later that year, to avoid securities regulation restricting the public listing of newly-formed companies, Daewoo Motor Sales announced a merger with HanDok, which operated businesses in watchmaking and amusement park development. In 1995, now operating as Woori Automobile Sales Co., Ltd., Daewoo Motor Sales formally merged with Handok. In 1997, Handok Construction, originally a subsidiary of Handok, was also merged with Daewoo Motor Sales.

Daewoo Motor Sales also operated Seoul Auto Auction, South Korea's largest auto auction, and a network of pre-owned car dealerships. In 1996, Daewoo Development established the brand name "Iaan". Korean Iaan commercials during that time featured the actress Kim Hee-sun.

Daewoo Motor Sales was a partner in Mitsubishi Motors South Korea (MMSK) Corporation, a joint venture involved in the South Korean distribution of vehicles from Mitsubishi Motors. 85% of the venture was owned by Daewoo Motor Sales, with the remaining 15% owned by Mitsubishi Corp and Mitsubishi Corp (Korea) Ltd. Retail sales in South Korea of Mitsubishi cars imported from Japan and the U.S. commenced in the second half of 2008. MMSK Corporation stopped importing U.S.-sourced Eclipse coupes a few years later.

In 2008, Daewoo also announced plans to import small fuel-efficient vehicles and large passenger vans from China for the Korean market.

Daewoo Motor Sales announced a joint venture in 2008 with Paramount for the construction of Paramount Movie Park Korea, with Paramount acting as its licensor and managing creative development. 499,575 sq ft. (roughly 123 acres) of land in Incheon was set aside. A budget of W1.5 trillion (nearly US$1.5 billion) was allocated to the project, which was expected to be completed in 2011. As of 2024, no work appears to have begun on the project, with Paramount opting in 2018 for a partnership with another developer to build a larger, more expensive park in Incheon (see Paramount Movie Park Korea).

Despite the dissolution of Daewoo Motors, Daewoo Motor Sales maintained dealing partnerships with the successors of Daewoo Motors, SsangYong Motor Company, and other foreign car companies. However, most of these partnerships were eventually terminated.

In 2010, GM Daewoo Auto & Technology Co., the Korean subsidiary of General Motors, announced it was severing ties with Daewoo Motor Sales Corporation. Daewoo Motor Sales responded by signing a deal with the SsangYong Motor Company to sell its vehicles (specifically the Rodius, Chairman W, and Chairman H vehicles) in return for the injection of W20 billion ($17.6 million) by Daewoo Motor Sales into SsangYong Motor Company, which at the time was mired in bankruptcy proceedings. The deal was non-exclusive, meaning SsangYong was still permitted to distribute its vehicles through other private dealers.

On April 14, 2010, Daewoo Motor Sales was placed into a debt restructuring program due to deteriorating financial problems. It is suspected that Daewoo Motor Sales experienced a liquidity crisis after revenues from its vehicle sales business were used to pay spiraling debts from its construction business. Following a last-minute consultation, creditors, including Korea Development Bank, decided to help Daewoo Motor Sales settle W17.66 billion ($15.98 million) worth of notes held by Daewoo Bus Corp. and Daewoo Commercial Vehicle Co. As part of its restructuring plan, Daewoo Motor Sales retained its bus sales, advertising, and rent-a-car businesses but shed its construction business, which would become Daewoo Development (대우산업개발). The new Daewoo Motor Sales was sold to Youngan Group, the parent company of Zyle Daewoo Commercial Vehicle, which renamed it Zyle Daewoo Bus Co., Ltd.

New ownership group Youngan Group refused to offer continued employment at Zyle Daewo Bus Co. to former Daewoo Motor Sales employees. On July 12, 2022, Baek Seong-hak, the chairman of Youngan Group, announced the dissolution of all assets of the Zyle Daewoo Bus Co., a layoff of 272 workers, and the merging of Zyle Daewoo Bus Co.'s remaining operations into the Zyle Automobile Co., Ltd. (another subsidiary of Youngan Group). On April 12, 2023, the South Korean National Labor Relations Commission upheld the ruling of the lower Ulsan Regional Labor Relations Commission that the dissolution of Zyle Daewoo Bus Co. was not legal; therefore, it concluded Zyle Motors ought to rehire the former workers. However, Zyle Motors refused to accept the decision.
