= Winia Electronics =

South Korean home appliance company, spun off from former Daewoo Group elements

- Formerly: Daewoo Electronics
- Type: Private
- Industry: Conglomerate
- Founded: 1987; 39 years ago
- Founder: Jinkyun Choi (CEO)
- Headquarters: Seoul, South Korea
- Area served: Worldwide
- Products: List: Electronics Shipbuilder Financial Chemical Retail Entertainment Automotive Electronics (Mainly for GM Daewoo vehicles & Daewoo Commercial Trucks) Flash memory Aviation Optical storage Mobile phones Smartphones Hard disk drive
- Net income: US$ 10.7 billion (2008)
- Total assets: US$ 252.5 billion (2008)
- Total equity: US$ 90.5 billion (2008)
- Number of employees: 250,000 (2020)
- Parent: Winia Group
- Website: winia-elec.com

Winia Electronics, formerly named Daewoo Electronics, is a South Korean home appliances company and a member of South Korean Winia Group. Established in 1971, it has since grown into a global business with more than 64 production sites, research and development and sales centres in more than 40 countries worldwide. Daewoo Electronics absorbed the appliance division of Taihan Electric Wire in 1983, further expanding the company’s appliance unit. Daewoo Electronics Sales UK (DESUK) was established in November 1993. It is the third largest electronics firm of South Korea after Samsung and LG. The company manufactures a range of electronics and home appliances also some automotive electronic equipments and accessories by being the OEM to assist its parent company's motor vehicle subsidiaries Daewoo Motors which is currently divided among US based Korean automotive manufacturer GM Korea & Tata Daewoo, the manufacturer of Daewoo Heavy Diesel Commercial vehicles.

== Acquisitions after bankruptcy ==
Former logo from 1978 until 1994.

The company's parent company went through a bankruptcy in 1999 due to the Asian financial crisis. After that, the company was owned completely by a group of creditors. Beside its business of manufacturing consumer goods, it has been contracted by different parties to set up local manufacturing units producing air-conditioners, refrigerators and washing machines. In October 2010, it was announced that the creditor group owning the company is to sell it to an Iran-based electronic company.

After years of trying, in January 2013, Dongbu Group (now known as DB Group) agreed to take over Daewoo Electronics for $270 million in order to attain synergies with DB families (Especially DB Inc., DB Hitek and Dongbu Steel). Daewoo Electronics became the family of DB Group by ending its workout status.

In March 2018, Dayou Group (now known as Winia Group) acquired Daewoo Electronics from DB Group.

== Dayyani v. the Republic of Korea ==
In November 2010, Iranian company Entekhab Industrial Group offered to buy Daewoo Electronics from its creditors for $US529 million. Swedish company Electrolux also made an offer of $513 million. Entekhab's offer was accepted, and it paid 57 billion won ($US49.67m) as a deposit, but in June 2011, creditors of Daewoo, led by state-run Korea Asset Management Corp (KAMCO), cancelled the contract and retained the deposit after Entekhab missed a scheduled payment and asked for a discount. KAMCO and other creditors began proceedings to sell the company to Electrolux. Entekhab said they viewed the cancellation of the deal as illegal, and said it would take legal action to stop the sale of the company to Electrolux. Entekhab later sought the return of the deposit, but the creditors refused, holding Entekhab responsible for the cancellation.

In 2015, a group of investors led by Mohammed Reza Dayyani, the largest shareholder of Entekhab, began arbitration proceedings at the International Center for Settlement of Investment Disputes (ICSID) seeking compensation from the South Korean government under the Iran-South Korea bilateral investment treaty for the investment deposit that they lost, plus interest. In June 2018, the ICSID ruled in favour of Dayyani. The Korean government appealed to the High Court of Justice in England, which in December 2019 denied the appeal. As a result of the ruling, the South Korean government must pay $62.9 million (73.0 billion won) to Dayyani and the other plaintiffs.

== Resources ==
- "About Daewoo Electronics". daewooelectronics.co.uk. Archived from the original on 28 August 2015.
