= POSCO (disambiguation) =

POSCO (Pohang Iron and Steel Company) is a South Korean steel-making company based in Pohang.

POSCO may also refer to:

- POSCO India, Indian subsidiary of POSCO
- Posco Energy, energy subsidiary of POSCO

== See also ==
- Protection of Children from Sexual Offenses Act (POCSO), 2012 Indian law to protect child rights
