= Daewoo =

Defunct South Korean conglomerate

- Former Daewoo Group headquarters in 1995
- Type: Chaebol
- Founded: 22 March 1967; 59 years ago
- Founder: Kim Woo-choong
- Defunct: 1 November 1999; 26 years ago
- Fate: Declared bankruptcy (see details)
- Headquarters: Seoul, South Korea
- Number of employees: 320,000
- Divisions: List: Bus; Electronics; Heavy Industries; International; Motors; Motor Sales; Securities; Shipbuilding & Marine Engineering
- Subsidiaries: Corona Data Systems; Leading Edge Products; OCN (TV channel); SNT Motiv

Korean name
- Hangul: 대우
- Hanja: 大宇
- RR: Daeu
- MR: Taeu

Daewoo (UK: /ˈdeɪ.uː/ DAY-oo; US: /ˌdeɪˈwuː/ day-WOO; Korean: 대우; Hanja: 大宇; IPA: [tɛ.u]; lit. "great universe" and a portmanteau of "dae" meaning great, and the given name of founder and chairman Kim Woo-choong) also known as the Daewoo Group, was a major South Korean chaebol (type of conglomerate) and automobile manufacturer.

It was founded on 22 March 1967 as Daewoo Industrial and was declared bankrupt on 1 November 1999, with debts of about US$50 billion (equivalent to $97 billion in 2025). Prior to the 1997 Asian financial crisis, Daewoo was the third largest conglomerate in South Korea, behind the Hyundai Group and Lucky-Goldstar (later became LG Corporation). There were about 20 divisions under the Daewoo Group, some of which survived as independent companies.

== History ==
=== Beginning and development ===
The Daewoo Group was founded by Kim Woo-choong in March 1967. He was the son of the Provincial Governor of Daegu.

During the 1960s, the new government of Park Chung Hee intervened to promote growth and development in the country. It increased access to resources, promoted exports, financed industrialization, and provided protection from competition to the chaebol in exchange for a company's political support. In the beginning, the Korean government instigated a series of five-year plans under which the chaebol were required to achieve a number of basic objectives.

Daewoo did not become a major player until the second five-year plan. Daewoo benefited from government-sponsored cheap loans based on potential export profits. The company initially concentrated on labor-intensive clothing and textile industries that provided high profit margins because of South Korea's large and relatively inexpensive workforce.

The third and fourth of the five-year plans occurred from 1973 to 1981. During this period, the country's labor force was in high demand. Competition from other countries began eroding South Korea's competitive edge. The government responded to this change by concentrating its efforts on mechanical and electrical engineering, shipbuilding, petrochemicals, construction, and military initiatives. At the end of this period, the government forced Daewoo into shipbuilding. Kim was reluctant to enter this industry, but Daewoo soon earned a reputation for producing competitively priced ships and oil rigs.

During the next decade, the Korean government became more liberal in its economic policies. Small private companies were encouraged, protectionist import restrictions were loosened, and the government reduced positive discrimination (affirmative action), to encourage free market trade and to force the chaebol to be more aggressive abroad. Daewoo responded by establishing a number of joint ventures with U.S. and European companies. It expanded exports of machine tools, defense products (under the S&T Daewoo company), aerospace interests, and semiconductor design and manufacturing. Eventually, it began to build civilian helicopters and airplanes, priced considerably cheaper than those produced by its U.S. counterparts. It also expanded efforts in the automotive industry and was ranked as the seventh largest car exporter and the sixth largest car manufacturer in the world. Throughout this period, Daewoo experienced great success at turning around faltering companies in South Korea.

In the 1980s and early 1990s, the Daewoo Group also produced consumer electronics, computers, telecommunications products, construction equipment, buildings, and musical instruments.

=== Crisis and collapse ===
Daewoo Group ran into deep financial trouble in 1998 due to the 1997 Asian financial crisis, increasingly precarious relationships with the Korean government under President Kim Dae-jung, and its poor financial management. With the Korean government in deficit, access to cheap and nearly unlimited credit was severely restricted.

In 1998, when the impact of the foreign exchange crisis forced most of the chaebol to cut back, Daewoo added 14 new firms to its existing 275 subsidiaries, in a year where the group lost a total of ₩550 billion (equivalent to ₩1.05 trillion or US$736.35 million in 2025) on sales of ₩62 trillion (equivalent to ₩118.02 trillion or US$83.01 billion in 2025). At the end of 1997, South Korea's fourth-largest chaebol had a debt of nearly five times their equity. While Samsung and LG cut back in the midst of the economic crisis, Daewoo took on 40% more debt.

By 1999, Daewoo, the second largest conglomerate in South Korea with interests in about 100 countries, went bankrupt, with debts of about US$50 billion (equivalent to $97 billion in 2025).

Soon after the demise, Kim Woo-choong fled to Vietnam, and former Daewoo factory workers put up wanted posters with his picture. Kim returned to Korea in June 2005 and was promptly arrested. He was charged with masterminding accounting fraud of 41 trillion won (US$43.4 billion), illegally borrowing 9.8 trillion won (US$10.3 billion), and smuggling US$3.2 billion out of the country, according to South Korea's Yonhap News Agency. On 30 May 2006, Kim was sentenced to 10 years in prison after being convicted of fraud and embezzlement. On the last day of the trial, Kim tearfully addressed the court, "I cannot dodge my responsibility of wrongly buttoning up the final button of fate."

=== Breakup and present status ===
The group was reorganized into three separate parts: Daewoo Corporation, Daewoo Engineering & Construction and Daewoo International Corporation. They are active in many markets, most significantly in steel processing, ship building and financial services. The corporate entity known as "Daewoo Corporation" is now known as "Daewoo Electronics" and is focused solely on manufacturing electronics.

Daewoo Electronics survives to this day, despite bankruptcy, with a new brand logo "DE", but many of the other subsidiaries and divisions have become independent or simply perished. In North America, Target stores market Daewoo Electronics products under their "Trutech" brand on an original design manufacturer (ODM) basis.

In 2004, General Motors pulled the Daewoo brand of vehicles out of Australia and New Zealand, citing irreparable brand damage. Later that same year, GM announced that Daewoo Motors in Europe would be rebadged as Chevrolet on 1 January 2005. In 2005, it was announced that Daewoo cars would have a Holden badge in Australia and New Zealand. In South Africa, Thailand, and the Middle East, Daewoo models were already branded Chevrolet. In South Korea, Daewoo was renamed GM Korea.

As part of the company reorganization, the content and the structure of its brand portfolio (its brand architecture) was reorganized. In 2011, GM discontinued the Daewoo brand name in South Korea and Vietnam and replaced it with the Chevrolet brand. The brand stayed used by GM in various CIS countries where it had a strong presence such as Belarus, Tajikistan, Moldova, Kazakhstan and Uzbekistan until the mid-2010s. It was progressively phased out and replaced by Chevrolet or Ravon.

The Daewoo commercial vehicle manufacturer was taken over by Tata Motors.

=== Involvement in Myanmar ===
Daewoo also moved into the oil and gas industry. While Western oil and gas companies were unwilling to conduct business in Myanmar, Daewoo is one of three oil companies, along with the French company TotalEnergies and the American company Unocal, operating in the country. During explorations in 2008, Daewoo found one of the largest gas fields in southeast Asia, the Shwe offshore field, in the Bay of Bengal, about 100 km off Sittwe. The field went into production in 2013.

== Corporations ==
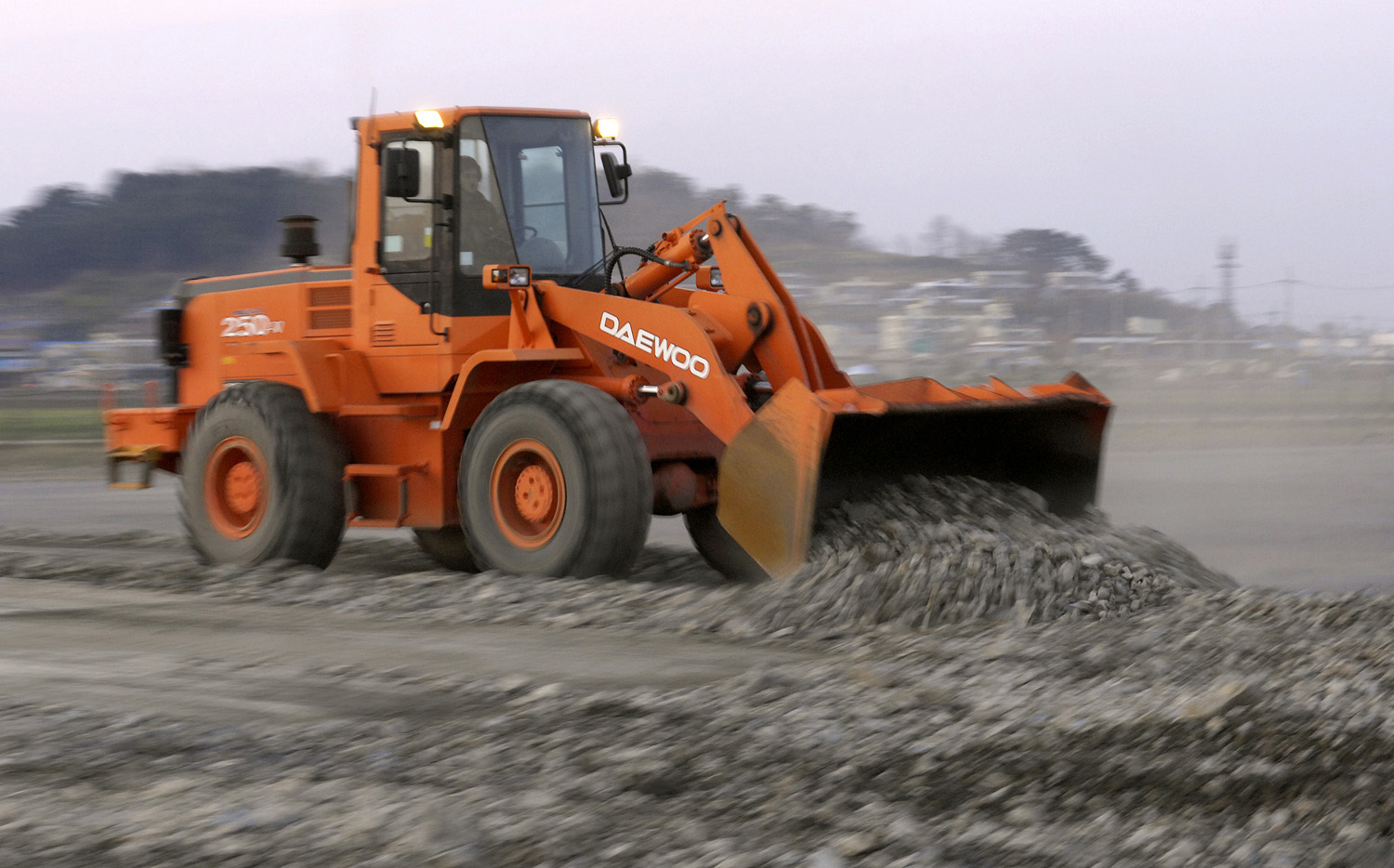
A wheel-loader produced by Daewoo Heavy Industries

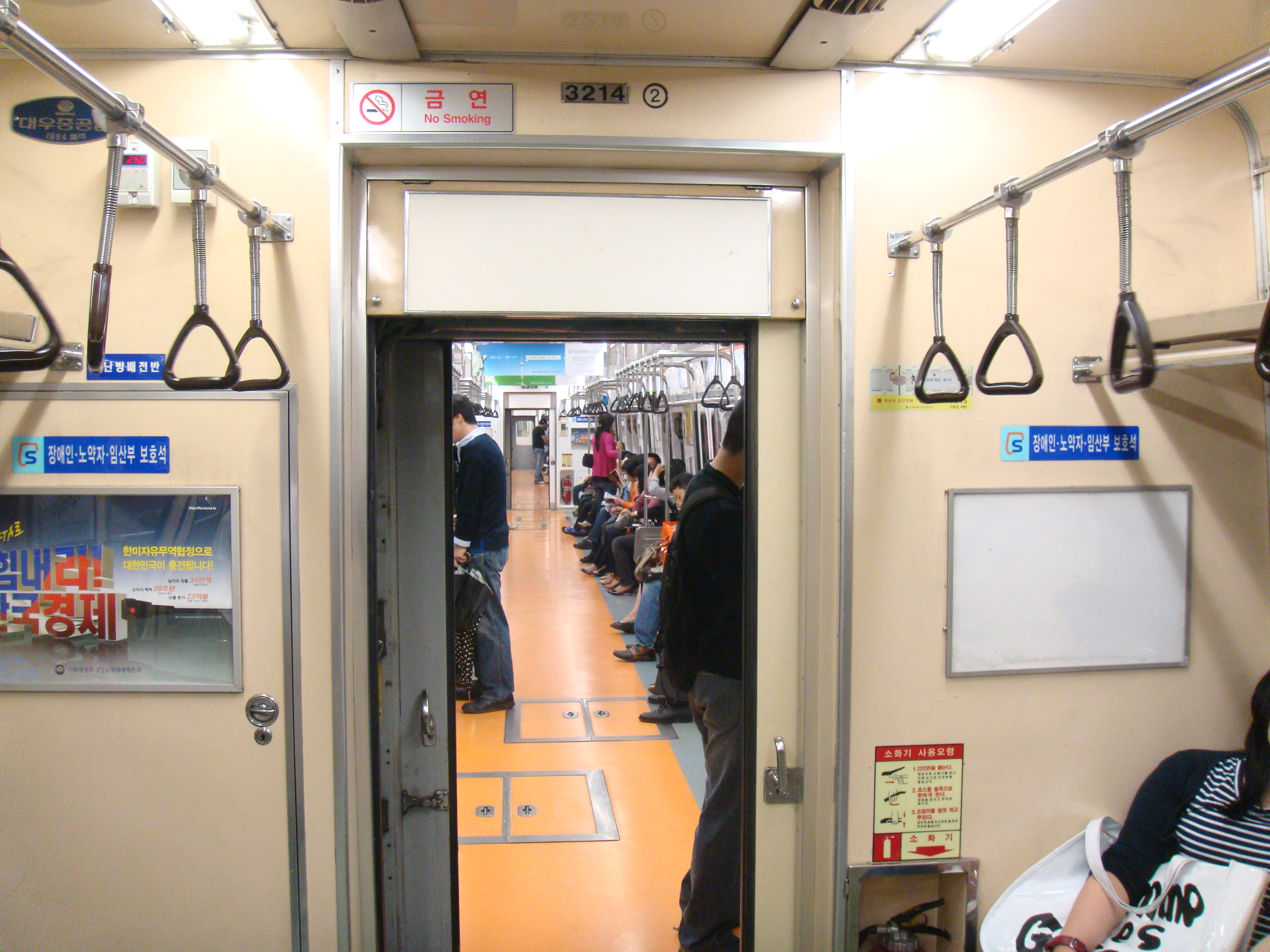
A Seoul metropolitan car (Seoul Metro Class 3000), produced by DHI in 1984

Daewoo Group had under its umbrella several major corporations:

The That-El-Emad towers built by Daewoo Corporations Construction Div. in Tripoli, Libya

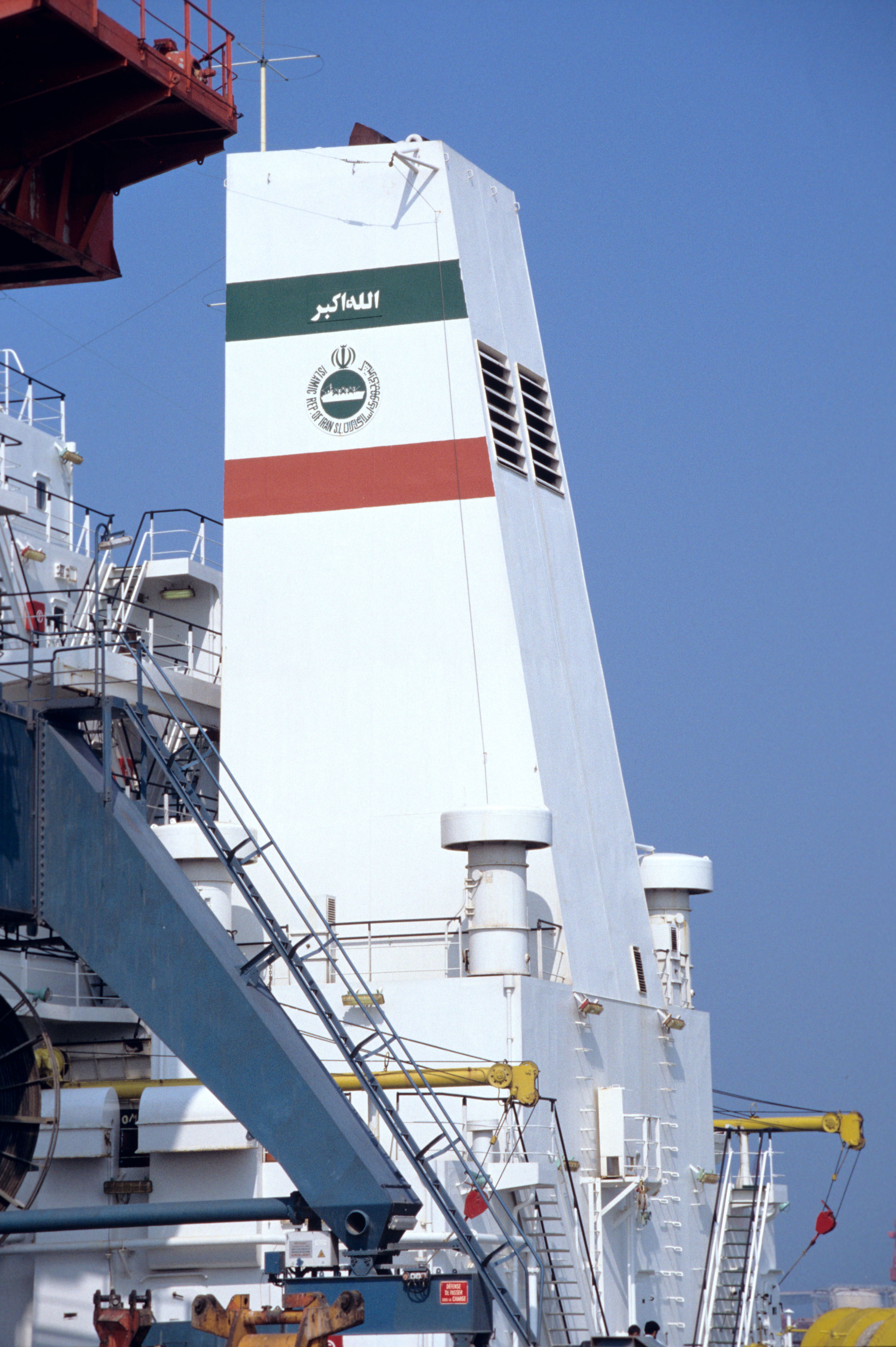
The 'Iran Sadr' ship, built by Daewoo Shipbuilding & Marine Engineering in 1985

- Daewoo Electronics, a strong force both internationally and in South Korea (sub-branch Daewoo Electronic Components Co. Ltd, Daewoo Electric Motor Industries Ltd., Orion Electric Co. Ltd.)
- Daewoo Electronic Components manufactures and sells a variety of electronic parts and components, especially for automobile, CRT televisions, monitors, VCRs and other multimedia products.
- Daewoo Motors, the motor vehicles division (sub-branch Daewoo Automotive Components Co. Ltd., Daewoo Bus Co., Ltd., Daewoo Commercial Vehicle Co. Ltd.)
- Daewoo Motor Sales, an auto sales company sold Daewoo but also GM cars and others in South Korea (Sub-branch: Architectural Iaan Div., SAA-Seoul Auto Auction)
- Zyle Daewoo Bus, is a manufacturer of buses. headquartered in Busan, South Korea, established in 2002. These buses are primarily used for public transportation
- Daewoo Precision Industries produced small calibre firearms, auto parts and pianos. It was spun off in February 2002 and relisted on the South Korean stock-market in March 2002. It was renamed S&T Daewoo Co., Ltd in September 2006, and then S&T Motiv Co., LTD in March 2012.
- Daewoo Textile Co. Ltd.
- Daewoo Heavy Industries (DHI), which created heavy duty machinery
- Daewoo E&C
- Daewoo Shipbuilding & Marine Engineering produced container ships, oil tankers and planes. It spun off in 2000 and became an independent company, DSME, re-listing on the South Korean stock-market in 2001
- Daewoo Securities, a financial securities company
- Daewoo Telecom Ltd., which concentrated on the telecommunications (sub-branch Daewoo Informations Systems Co. Ltd.)
- Daewoo Corporation, (sub-branch Daewoo Construction, Keangnam Enterprises) which built highways, dams and skyscrapers, especially in the Middle East and Africa
- Daewoo International, a trading organization
- Daewoo Development Co. Ltd., managing Daewoo hotels around the world and had the Millennium Hilton Seoul franchise in South Korea
- IAE (Institute for Advanced Engineering): research and development integrated center

A further subsidiary was the Daewoo Development Company, funded by cash from the Group and set up to develop hotels. Seven were built in South Korea, China, Vietnam, and Africa. They were personally designed and furnished by Kim Woo-jung's socialite wife Heeja, who was chairwoman of the company. The most lavish is the 5-star Hanoi Daewoo Hotel, which cost US$163 million to build in 1996 and was decorated by Heeja with fine art, porcelain, sculptures, and marble. She invited 3,000 guests to the opening, including Russian President Vladimir Putin. Kim is believed to have spent time there while "on the run".

=== Daewoo Motor Co., Ltd. ===
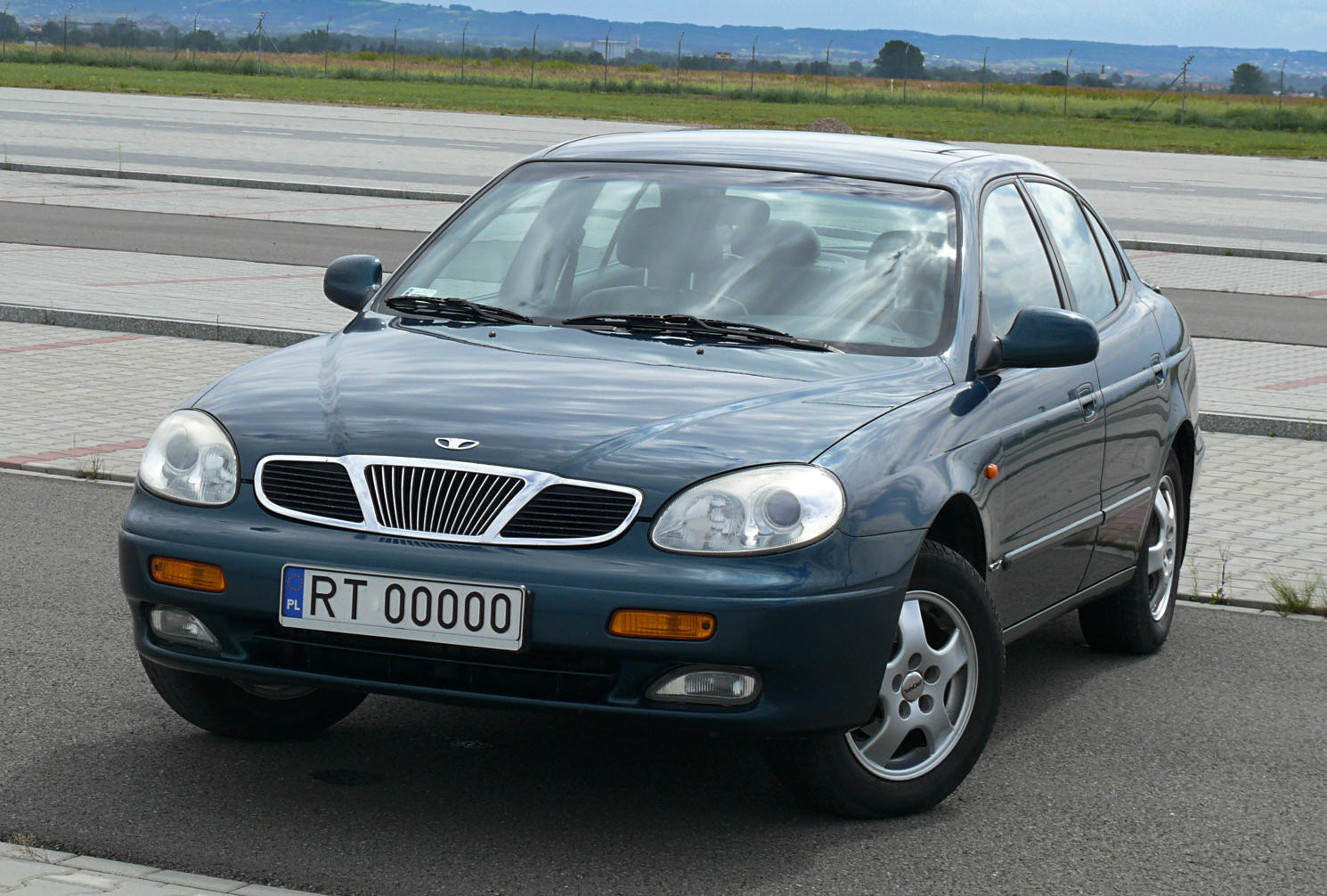
Daewoo Motors' 1997 Leganza

Daewoo Motor Co., Ltd. was founded when the Daewoo Group purchased Saehan Motors in 1978, but the Daewoo Motor name did not appear until 1983.

The Daewoo Motor brand appeared in the UK in 1995. At the time, it was the only manufacturer not using traditional dealerships – it owned and operated its own retail network. It was once considered to be among the top 10 motor companies in terms of production.

Due to financial trouble, Daewoo's automotive arm, Daewoo Motors, was sold to General Motors Korea in 2001. The Daewoo nameplate continued in South Korea and Vietnam until 2011. The former Daewoo facilities are now producing General Motors vehicles for Asian markets.

Daewoo Commercial Vehicles Division was sold to Tata Motors.

== The Daewoo brand today ==
As of September 2022, companies that remain with the "Daewoo" brand name are:

- Daewoo E&C – Specializing in construction
- Daewoo Express – Inter-city common carrier of passengers by bus serving over 60 destinations in Pakistan.
- Tata Daewoo – Specializing in commercial vehicles, wholly owned by Tata Motors of India
- Zyle Daewoo Bus – Specializing in buses
- Daewoo Electronics

== See also ==
- Chaebol
- Economy of South Korea
- List of companies of South Korea
