= POSCO International =

South Korean company

Posco International Corporation
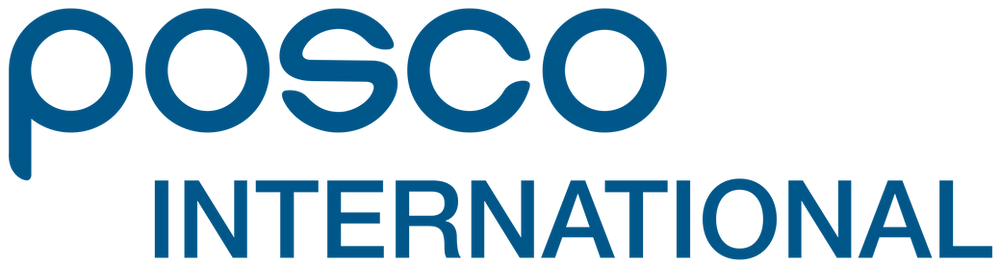

- Headquarters at Incheon, Korea
- Native name: 주식회사 포스코인터내셔널
- Romanized name: Jusikhoesa Poseuko Inteonaesyeoneol
- Formerly: Daewoo Corporation (1967–2000); Daewoo International (2000–2016); Posco Daewoo (2016–2019)
- Type: Public
- Traded as: KRX: 047050
- Industry: Energy & Resource Development, International Trading & Investment, Project Organization
- Founded: 1967; 59 years ago
- Founder: Kim Woo-choong(founder)
- Headquarters: Seoul, South Korea; Incheon, South Korea
- Area served: Worldwide
- Key people: Lee Kye-in (President & CEO)
- Products: Steel, LNG, Automotive components, Agro/Crop
- Services: Energy(Gas, LNG, Solar, Wind, Hydrogen); Steel&Metal; Infrastructure; Chemicals; Mineral resources Food; Consumer Goods; Automotive
- Revenue: ▲US$ 30 billion (2022 )
- Operating income: ▲US$ 712.2 million (2022)
- Net income: ▲US$ 477.3 million (2022)
- Number of employees: 1,208 (2022)
- Parent: POSCO; Daewoo Group (Formerly)
- Subsidiaries: POSCO MOBILITY SOLUTION
- Website: poscointl.com

POSCO International Corporation (Korean: 포스코인터내셔널) is South Korea's largest trading company and a subsidiary of POSCO.

The company was founded by Kim Woo-choong in 1967 as Daewoo Industrial Co., Ltd, which ran its business in trading and construction. In 1999, the company faced at least $50 billion in debt, and Daewoo became formally dismantled. In 2000, as Daewoo Group faced work-out program, Daewoo Industrial Co., Ltd's trading segment was split and established as "Daewoo International Corporation". Afterwards, it succeeded in general trading license and was listed on the stock market again. In 2016, the Company name changed from "Daewoo International" to "POSCO Daewoo". After merging with Posco P&S in 2017, the company name was changed to what it is currently, "POSCO International Corporation" in 2019

On 2 November 2020, POSCO International and Erae AMS was to supply the Vietnamese carmaker VinFast with electrical vehicle (EV) components.

It aimed to issue ESG bonds for first time for Korean trading companies in year 2021.

In the year 2022, Posco International acquired Australian gas and energy company Senex.

In the year 2023, Posco International merged with its sister company Posco Energy, integrating upstream and downstream LNG movement. The company announced a new vision "Green Energy & Global Business Pioneer" to create, connect, and complete business to enrich the future. POSCO International is making its way towards becoming a global eco-friendly integrated corporation.

== Operations ==
POSCO INTERNATIONAL Corporation has its head office in 134, Teheran-ro, Gangnam-gu, Seoul, Korea. Its global network consists of over 80 overseas branches and subsidiaries.

== Board of Directors ==
- Kye-in Lee, Representative Director & Inside Director
- Kyung-jin Jung, Inside Director
- Ki-seop Jung, Non-Executive Director
- Haeng-hee Lee, Outside Director
- Ho-geun Song, Outside Director
- Tae-woong Huh, Outside Director
- Jong-soo Han, Outside Director
- Young-hwan Jeon, Outside Director

== Business sectors ==
As of Jan 2023, after the merge with POSCO Energy, the company restructured in the following ways. The main purpose of organizational change was to boost energy business through the completion of LNG value chain, and global trading in the sectors steel/agro/eco-friendly materials.

Energy - E&P, Gas operations, Energy(LNG, Solar, Wind, Hydrogen), Resource development

Steel - Export/Import/Triangular sales: Semi-finished Goods & Long Products, Wire Rods, Thick Steel Plates, Steel Products for the Energy Industry, Hot-Rolled Steel Sheets, Cold-Rolled Steel Sheets. Coated Steel Sheets, Color Steel Plates, Electrical Steel, Automotive Steel Sheets, Stainless Steel, Steel Building Materials, Lithium-ion Battery Materials. Domestic processing and distribution: POSCO Mobility Solution, eSTEEL4U

Agro - Grain trading, Palm oil, Cotton business

New Growth Business - Bioplastics, Eco-friendly car parts, Public infrastructure

Splits steel processing and manufacturing sectors as subsidiary, and names POSCO SPS, which changed its name to POSCO Mobility Solution.

=== Criticism ===
Posco has been criticised for running gas projects in Myanmar that financially benefit the country's military junta. Posco runs the Shwe gas project, and have been named by the Guardian as one company profiting from its "operations that have helped prop up the military regime". The EU has also sanctioned MOGE, which owns a 15% stake in the Shwe gas project run by Posco.

Posco's subsidiary company, PT Bio Inti Agrindo (BIA) has faced criticism in Papua New Guinea for clearing 270 square kilometres of rainforest for a palm oil plantation between 2012 and 2018. The company has also been involved in disputes with indigenous communities about land rights. In 2020 the company adopted a new deforestation policy and said it would compensate some areas that it had deforested.

According to eco-business.com, "Posco International, which has 34,000 hectares of palm oil plantations in Papua and produced about 80,000 tonnes of palm oil last year, will also require third-party suppliers to observe its No Deforestation, No Peatland, No Exploitation (NDPE) policy."

== History ==
Year	Accomplishments
1967. 03	Daewoo Corporation was established
1982	Trade Division was incorporated into Daewoo Corp.
1999. 08	12 companies under Daewoo Group including Daewoo Corporation begin workout program
2000. 12	Daewoo International Corporation was spun off from Daewoo Corporation
2003. 12	The company completes the workout program
2004. 12	Sales amount exceeded 5 trillion won
2005. 01	Received the grand prize for transparent management
2005. 03	Receives the decoration of gold tower on the Day of Commerce and Industry
2005. 05	Company was incorporated into KRX100 Index
2005. 08	Receives a Global Management Grand Prize (from the Korea Economic Daily)
2005. 11	Acquired credit rating BBB+
2005. 12	Acquires certification for excellence in information systems
2006. 06	Receives prize for excellence in corporate governance
2006. 07	Receives the prize of merit commemorating the 60th anniversary of the International Trading Day
2006. 12	Receives the best prize in the sector of future management in the management grand prize
2006. 12	Acquired Certification for an excellent company in information systems
2007. 05	Acquired credit rating of "A"
2007. 06	Awarded grand prize for shareholder value (The Money Today)
2007. 10	Awarded grand prize in the sector of global management (Korea Management Association)
2007. 10	Awarded grand prize for digital knowledge management (National Information Society Agency)
2008. 02	Secured exploration rights of 35&36 blocks in Uzbekistan
2008. 12	Daewoo International Japan Corp. acquires ISO 14001 certification
2010. 08	The contract for a takeover was signed by POSCO and Korea Asset Management Corp
2010. 10	Appointment of Lee Dong – Hee as CEO & Chairman of BOD
2013. 06	Began commercial production of gas in Myanmar
2014. 05	Held a groundbreaking ceremony for a hotel in Myanmar
2015. 01	Relocated its headquarters to POSCO TOWER SONGDO in Songdo, Incheon
2016. 02	Discovered gas reserves in Myanmar's offshore block AD-7
2016. 03	Changed company name to POSCO DAEWOO
2017. 03	Acquired the steel business unit of POSCO P&S
2017. 03	Won gas exploration rights in Bangladesh's deep sea block 12
2019. 03	Renamed as POSCO INTERNATIONAL
2020. 04	Splits steel processing divisions as subsidiary POSCO SPS
2022. 03	Acquired Senex Energy of Australia
2023. 01	Merged with POSCO ENERGY
