= GM Korea =

South Korean subsidiary of General Motors

GM Korea Company

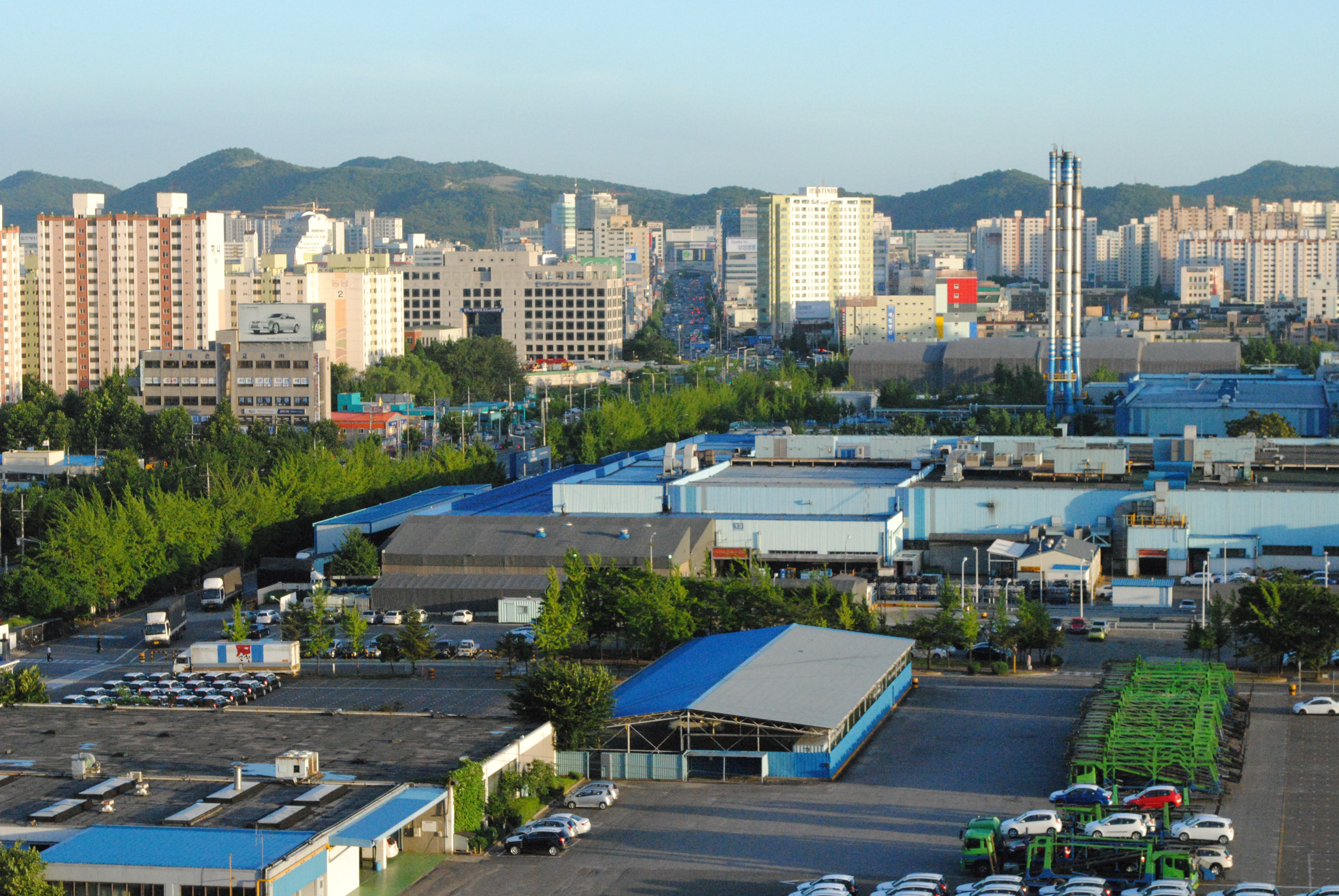
- View of the plant (front) in July 2010
- Native name: 한국지엠주식회사
- Formerly: GM Daewoo Auto and Technology Co.
- Type: Subsidiary
- Industry: Automotive
- Predecessor: Daewoo Motors
- Founded: 2002; 24 years ago
- Headquarters: Bupyeong District, Incheon, South Korea
- Key people: Hector Villarreal (President and CEO)
- Products: SUVs, pickup truck
- Production output: ▲499,559 (2024) (Note: The figure only includes the South Korea-built vehicles.)
- Revenue: ▼ ₩12.92 trillion (2014)
- Number of employees: 9,200 (2023)
- Parent: General Motors
- Divisions: Chevrolet; Cadillac; GMC; Former: Alpheon; Chevrolet Europe; Daewoo; GM Vietnam

Korean name
- Hangul: 한국지엠
- Hanja: 韓國지엠
- RR: Hanguk Jiem
- MR: Han'guk Chiem
- Website: gm-korea.co.kr

GM Korea Company (Note: Formerly GM Daewoo Auto & Technology Co.) (Korean: 한국지엠주식회사) (Note: Also spelled as 한국GM주식회사, IPA: [haːnɡuk tɕ͈i em dʑuɕikʰøsa]) is the South Korean subsidiary of American multinational corporation General Motors and the third largest automobile manufacturer in South Korea. GM Korea's roots go back to the former Daewoo Motors vehicle brand, which was split from its parent company, Daewoo, in 2002. In addition to importing vehicles for sale into South Korea, the company also operates three manufacturing facilities producing vehicles for the domestic market and for export.

== History ==
=== Predecessors ===
GM Korea's roots go back to the remnants of the Korean War and Shinjin Motors, which launched its business by rebuilding scrapped US military vehicles. Shinjin Motor was first established as National Motor in 1937 in Bupyeong-gu, Incheon, Japanese Korea. After changing its name to Saenara Motor in 1962, Saenara Motor was bought by Shinjin Industrial in 1965, which changed its name to Shinjin Motor after establishing a partnership with Toyota. After Toyota's withdrawal in 1972 (to keep doing business with China, which would not trade with companies who engaged in South Korea or Taiwan), Shinjin Motor changed its name to GM Korea (GMK) in 1972 with General Motors purchasing a 50% stake in the company from Toyota in 1972; however GMK was renamed again in 1976 to Saehan Motors.

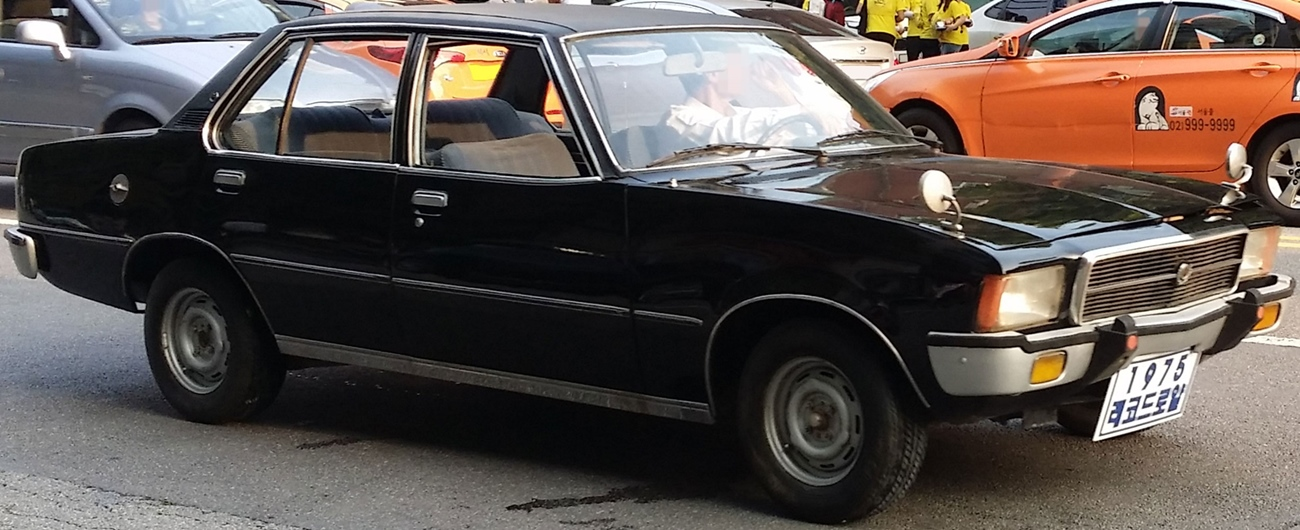
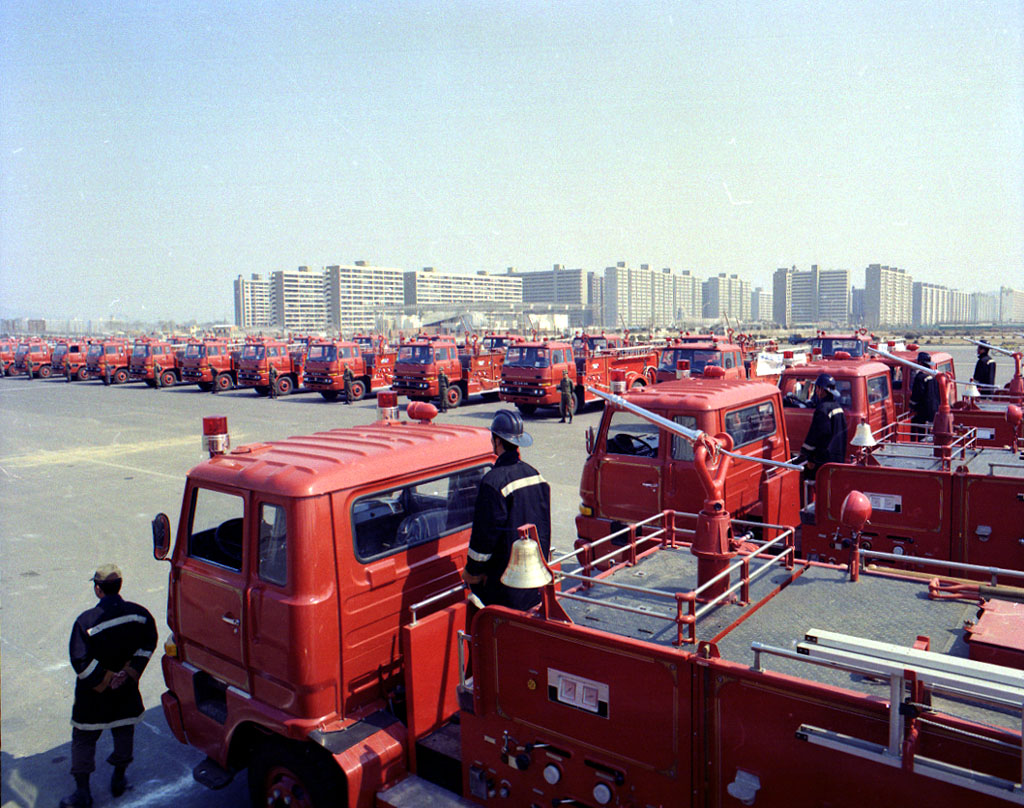
Two models by defunct GM Korea (GMK), predecessor of the current company, (left): GMK Rekord Royale (a rebadged Opel Rekord Series D) and 1977 firetrucks bodied by Ha Dong-hwan.

Korea Development Bank (KDB), the company's creditor, took over management in 1976 as the company found itself unable to cope with competition from Hyundai and Kia. After Daewoo gained control in 1982, the name was changed once more to Daewoo Motor. In the early 1990s the company started to expand heavily throughout the world. Until 1996 all Daewoo cars were based on GM-designed models. After the 1997 Asian financial crisis reached South Korea, Daewoo took over the troubled SUV manufacturer SsangYong in 1998, but ran into financial trouble and was forced to sell the company off in 2001 to GM affiliate SAIC.

=== Formation of GM Daewoo ===
In 2001, General Motors bought most of Daewoo Motor's assets to form "GM Daewoo Auto & Technology". The new company started operations on 17 October 2002, with GM and its partners Suzuki and SAIC holding a stake of 66.7% with investments of US$400 million. The GM holding was purchased by GM's Australian subsidiary, Holden, which held a seat on the board and was legally responsible for GM Daewoo. The remaining equity stake of 33.3% was held by Korea Development Bank and several other Korean creditors with investments of US$197 million. The deal did not include 15 plants, including Daewoo's oldest plant in Bupyeong-gu which is now operated under the name Incheon Motor Company as a supplier to GM Daewoo. In 2004, Tata Motors purchased Daewoo Commercial Vehicle, which had been spun out of bankrupt Daewoo Motor Co. in 2002. In February 2005, GM invested US$49 million to raise its share in the company to 48.2%. In 2010, General Motors owned 82.9%, SAIC 9.9%, and the Daewoo Motor Creditors Committee the remaining 7.2%.

On 25 November 2003, the design center was relocated to the new two-story building at the Bupyeong-gu headquarters. The first car to be produced under the GM Daewoo nameplate was the 2002 Daewoo Lacetti, replacing the Nubira. This car was developed in South Korea under the Daewoo Motor era, but it gradually became a GM world car, sold under many different marques all around the globe. After a few years without any new cars to present, in 2005, GM Daewoo introduced the Holden-based Statesman luxury car replacing the discontinued Daewoo Chairman. The third generation of Matiz was introduced, refreshed by the GM Daewoo design team, and an evolution of the four-door Kalos appeared: the Gentra.

In early 2006, GM Daewoo presented Tosca, the replacement of the Magnus. GM Daewoo's official press releases says that Tosca is an acronym for "Tomorrow Standard Car". The end of the same year, GM Daewoo introduced the Winstorm, its first proper sport utility vehicle (SUV), which was, as the Lacetti, sold worldwide under different brands and names including Opel Antara, Chevrolet Captiva and Holden Captiva, and previously Saturn Vue before the demise of the Saturn brand in 2010. It featured a common rail Diesel engine for the first time in a Daewoo vehicle, in addition to regular four and six cylinder gasoline engines. The diesel engine design was licensed from the Italian engine maker VM Motori.

2007 saw the introduction of the Lacetti and Kalos hatchback facelift's wagon version, becoming the Gentra X. For 2008, GM Daewoo introduced the first Korean-branded roadster: the G2X sports car, a badge-engineered Pontiac Solstice/Saturn Sky which was based on the GM Kappa platform, and started to sell the Opel Antara under the name of Winstorm MaXX. The Statesman flagship was also replaced by the new Veritas which is now based on the Holden Caprice V. In 2008, GM Korea built more than 1.9 million vehicles, including CKD products.

Late 2008 and early 2009 were a major period for GM Daewoo with the introduction of the all-new Lacetti Premiere, which is based on the Chevrolet Cruze, a very important compact car for GM divisions worldwide. The newly rechristened third generation of the Matiz was added to the range in 2009 as the Chevrolet Spark.

2010 saw the introduction of the Chevrolet Orlando and Alpheon, a local version of the Buick LaCrosse.

=== Establishment of GM Korea ===
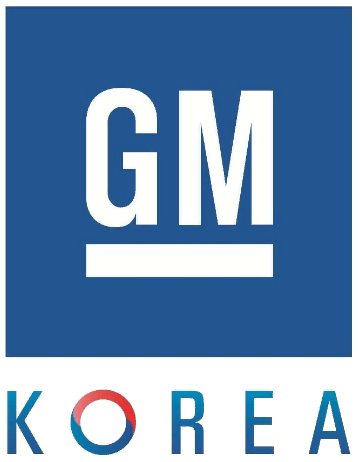
Former logo of GM Korea

On 20 January 2011, General Motors announced that GM Daewoo would be renamed GM Korea "to reflect Daewoo's heightened status in the global operations of GM", effective March 2011. Most of the remaining Daewoo vehicles were rebadged as Chevrolets, although the Damas/Labo microtrucks were sold without a brand name since 2011.

GM's luxury division Cadillac entered South Korea in 1996 and, with a record sales year of 28,000 units in 2017, South Korea became the fifth largest market for Cadillac worldwide (after China, the United States, Canada and the Middle East).

In 2011, the Daewoo Tosca was replaced by a locally built version of the Chevrolet Malibu.

More recently, the low annual incomes a result of lower levels of sales, led to closing the non-profitable factories of the GM Korea unit.

=== GM withdrawal from Europe and crisis ===
Starting from 2014, GM halted sales of all Chevrolet-branded cars in Europe, India, East and South Africa, most of which had up to then been manufactured completely or in part by GM Korea. In 2017, General Motors finalized its move out of the European market by selling the Opel and Vauxhall brands to PSA Group (now Stellantis). This caused closure of GM Korea's Gunsan plant due to low productivity. The GM Vietnam vehicle assembly plant in Hanoi, which was managed by GM Korea, was sold to VinFast in 2018.

In 2019, GM Korea split its R&D unit, GM Technical Center Korea (GMTCK), into a separate firm despite protests by unions worried about potential layoffs at factories. General Motors announced on 16 February 2020 that "as part of a strategy to exit markets that don't produce adequate returns on investments" it was exiting from all right-hand drive markets worldwide, including Australia, New Zealand, and Thailand. This coincided with the demise in 2020 of the Holden brand, hitherto a large distributor of GM Korea products.

In April 2022, GM Korea's Bupyeong 2 plant was closed due to reduced productivity. The Spark and Malibu were to be discontinued in the South Korean market by August 2022.

The Bolt EV and Bolt EUV were discontinued in the South Korean market on 1 December 2023.

== Leadership ==
- CBE David "Nick" Reilly (2002-2006)
- Michael A. Grimaldi (2006–2009)
- Michael "Mike" Arcamone (2009–2011)
- John Buttermore (Temporary, 2011–2012)
- Sergio Rocha (2012–2016)
- James Kim (2016–2017)
- Kaher Kazem (2017–2022)
- Roberto Rogerio Rempel (2022–2023)
- Hector Raul Villarreal Gonzalez (2023–present)

== Manufacturing facilities ==
- Boryeong: transmission and engine components manufacturing
- Bupyeong-gu: vehicle assembly and engine manufacturing (production capacity: est. 440,000/year)
- Changwon: vehicle assembly and engine manufacturing (production capacity: est. 210,000/year)

=== Former manufacturing facilities ===
South Korea

- Gunsan: vehicle assembly and diesel engine manufacturing (production capacity: est. 260,000/year). Its plant closed on 31 May 2018. The factory was later acquired by the Chinese electric commercial vehicles company Farizon, which in conjunction with Myoung Shin. The company plans to manufacture CKD-made electric trucks for the South Korean market. On May 29, it was announced that it would give up production of finished vehicles and switch to the automobile parts and automation equipment business.

Vietnam

- Hanoi: GM Vietnam vehicle assembly (production capacity: est. 11,000/year). Acquired by VinFast in 2018.

== Model range ==
=== Current locally manufactured models ===
==== Buick (for export only) ====
- Encore GX – Subcompact crossover SUV
- Envista – Subcompact crossover SUV

==== Chevrolet ====
- Trailblazer – Subcompact crossover SUV
- Trax – Subcompact crossover SUV

=== Current imported models ===
Buick

- Electra E7 – Mid-size crossover SUV

==== Cadillac ====
- Escalade (ESV/IQ/IQL) – Full-size SUV

==== GMC ====
- Sierra – Full-size pickup truck
- Acadia – Mid-size crossover SUV
- Canyon – Mid-size pickup truck
- Hummer EV – Full-size SUV

== See also ==
- Daewoo Bus
- Daewoo Motor Sales
- List of Daewoo models
- Automotive industry in South Korea
