= Paramount Movie Park Korea =

Planned theme park in Incheon

- Location: Inspire Integrated Entertainment Resort, Incheon, South Korea
- Status: Planned
- Opens: 2029
- Owner: Mohegan Gaming & Entertainment
- Theme: Paramount films

Paramount Movie Park Korea is a theme park and resort complex that was scheduled to open in Incheon, South Korea in 2011, however construction has yet to start. On December 6, 2018, Mohegan Gaming & Entertainment announced the strategic partnership with Paramount Pictures to bring a Paramount-branded theme park to its Inspire Integrated Entertainment Resort area, subsequently reviving the project. It is now scheduled to open in 2029.

== Overview ==
The theme park will be based on brands such as Mission: Impossible, Spongebob Squarepants, Teenage Mutant Ninja Turtles, and Star Trek. It will be the world's first Paramount Pictures-based theme park and resort complex, with the cost of $1.5 billion. In October 2024, the park was delayed to 2029 and given the new name Star Bay City.

Though CBS & Viacom owned five amusement parks in North America, this will be the first theme park actually constructed for Paramount, while the previous Paramount Parks were originally KECO Entertainment parks which were bought and re-branded.
