= Posco Energy =

POSCO Energy
- Industry: Electricity
- Founded: 1969
- Headquarters: Seoul, South Korea
- Key people: Ko Seong-Sick (Chief Executive Officer)
- Products: Electric power LNG fuel cells
- Revenue: ▲KRW 1,917,600,000,000 Won (2011)
- Net income: ▲KRW 46,100,000,000 Won (2011)
- Total equity: KRW 233,300,000,000 Won (2011)
- Number of employees: 630
- Parent: POSCO
- Website: eng.poscoenergy.com/_service/main.asp

POSCO Energy is the largest private energy producer in South Korea. It is a member of the POSCO consortium, and was established in November 1969, in South Korea as the nation's first private electricity supplier. The main businesses are in coal-fired power generation, fuel cells, liquid natural gas (LNG), and off-gas power.

With the completion of construction on the Incheon LNG combined cycle power plant in 2012, POSCO Energy will have 3,300 MW of power generation facilities.

It is headquartered in Seoul, South Korea.

According to the group policy, it was merged into POSCO International as of January 1, 2023.

== History ==
=== 1969–1999 ===
POSCO Energy was established in March 1969 as Kyung-In Energy Co., Ltd., a joint venture between Hanwha Group and Union Oil (U.S.). In February 1972, the company launched commercial operations of its LNG combined power plant in Incheon, with a total capacity of 325 MW. In December 1983, Union Oil withdrew its share from Kyung-In Energy. The company was later restructured, and in December 1999, Hanwha Energy Co., Ltd. was established after being hived off from Hanwha Group's Energy Department.

=== 2000–2006 ===
In July 2000, El Paso Natural Gas acquired a 50% share of the company, which was subsequently renamed Korea General Energy Co., Ltd. in October of the same year. In January 2002, a phased enlargement of the LNG combined power plant in Incheon was completed, bringing total capacity to 1,800 MW. In July 2005, POSCO Co. Ltd. and Korea Energy Investment Ltd. each acquired 50% of the shares previously held by Hanwha and El Paso, and the company was renamed POSCO Power Corp. in September 2005. Full 100% acquisition by POSCO Ltd. was completed in March 2006.

=== 2007–present ===
In February 2007, the company initiated its fuel cell business, transferred from POSCO Co., Ltd. A fuel cell BOP manufacturing factory was completed in Pohang (Yeonsan, 100 MW) in September 2008, and units 5 and 6 of the LNG combined power plant were completed in December 2008, bringing total capacity to 3,000 MW.

In March 2009, Sung-sik Cho was inaugurated as CEO, and a fuel cell technology lab was established in June of that year. The company announced its "New Vision" in November 2009 for its 40th anniversary. A fuel cell stack manufacturing factory in Pohang was completed in April 2010. Also in December 2010, the company signed an agreement for a solar power plant in Boulder City, Nevada (300 MW), and the Gwangyang Off-gas Power Plant (300 MW) was completed.

In February 2011, the company launched a coal-fired power project in Vietnam (Mong Duong 2, 1,200 MW), and in March 2011 the Women's Table Tennis Club was founded and the fuel cell stack manufacturing factory was completed. In January 2012, the first phase of the Shinan solar photovoltaic power generation project was completed, and in February 2012 a saprophytism power plant in Pohang was launched. The company was renamed POSCO Energy Corp. in February 2012 and Chang-Gwan Oh was inaugurated as CEO in March 2012.

== Operations ==
=== Subsidiaries ===
POSCO Energy's subsidiaries include Pohang Fuel Cell Power Plant Co., Ltd., PSC Energy Global Co., Ltd., Sin-An Energy Co., Ltd., and Posco E&E Co., Ltd.

=== Power plant ===
- Incheon LNG Power
- Plant Unit 1 to 4
- Plant Unit 5, 6
- Gwangyang Off-gas power
- Pohang Off-gas power

=== LNG terminal ===
- Gwangyang LNG Terminal

=== New projects ===
- Green Project (solar power plant in Boulder City, Nevada, US / solar power plant in Sin-an City)
- Global IPP Project (Vietnam Mong Duong II coal-fired power plant project / Indonesia CSP off-gas power project)
