= Daewoo Motors =

Defunct South Korean automotive company

- Daewoo logo (2002–2016)

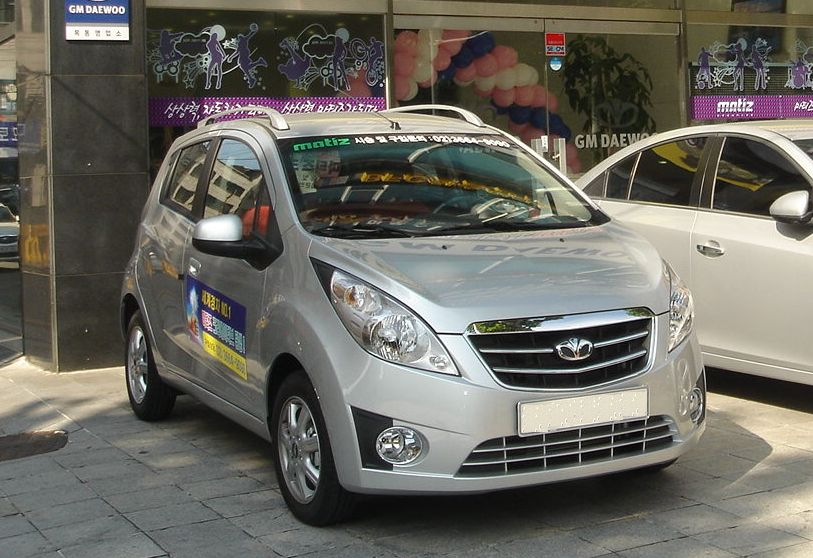
- 2013 Daewoo Matiz Creative
- Formerly: National Motors (1937–1962); Saenara Motors (1962–1966); Shinjin Motors (1966–1972); GM Korea (1972–1976) (Note: It was a joint venture established by local Shinjin Motors and General Motors, not related to the GM Korea established in 2002 after the Daewoo's bankruptcy.); Saehan Motors (1976–1982); Daewoo Motor (1982–2002)
- Type: Private (1935–1965); Subsidiary (1978–1999)
- Industry: Automotive
- Founded: 1937
- Defunct: 2008; 18 years ago
- Fate: Bankrupt, acquired by General Motors in 2002, restarted as GM Daewoo
- Successor: Daewoo Commercial Vehicle; GM Korea
- Headquarters: Bupyeong, South Korea
- Key people: Kim Woo-choong (Chairman)
- Products: Automobiles
- Parent: Shinjin (1965–1976); Daewoo (1982–2002)
- Subsidiaries: SsangYong (1998–2000)

Daewoo Motors (/ˈdeɪwuː/ DAY-woo) was a South Korean automotive company established in 1937 as "National Motors". The company changed its name several times until 1982 when it became "Daewoo Motors" following its acquisition by the Daewoo Group. After running into financial difficulties, it sold most of its assets in 2002 to General Motors at $1.2 billion, becoming a subsidiary of the American company. In 2011, the name "Daewoo" was withdrawn with the company being renamed GM Korea and the Daewoo brand replaced by the Chevrolet marque.

== History ==
The company was established as "National Motor" in 1937 in Bupyeong-gu, Incheon, Japanese Korea. The name was changed to "Saenara Motor" in November 1962. Saenara was assembling and selling the Datsun Bluebird PL310. The first automobile company in South Korea, Saenara was equipped with modern assembly facilities, and was established after the Automobile Industry Promotion Policy was announced by the South Korean government in 1962. Saenara Motor was then bought by Shinjin Industrial in 1965, which changed its name to Shinjin Motors after establishing collaborations with Toyota.

After Toyota's withdrawal in 1972, Shinjin Motor started a joint venture with General Motors under the name "GM Korea", but was renamed again in 1976 to "Saehan Motors". GM Korea shortly sold their Rekord model under the GM Korea marque, together with the Chevrolet 1700, a rebadged Holden Torana.

=== Member of the Daewoo Group ===
After the Daewoo Group gained control in December 1982, from January 1983, the name was officially changed to "Daewoo Motor Co." Until 1996, all cars were based on models from General Motors. All Saehan models were named 'Daewoo', the Maepsy being refreshed became the Maepsy-Na. The Royale Series models were kept, Daewoo adding the Royale XQ and Royale Duke (March 1982), Royale Prince (July 1983) and Royale Salon Super (March 1986). Above the Royale range, the Daewoo Imperial flagship luxury car was added in 1989, with styling reminiscent of the contemporary Chrysler Imperial and New Yorker, but also luxury Japanese sedans. It was produced until 1993.

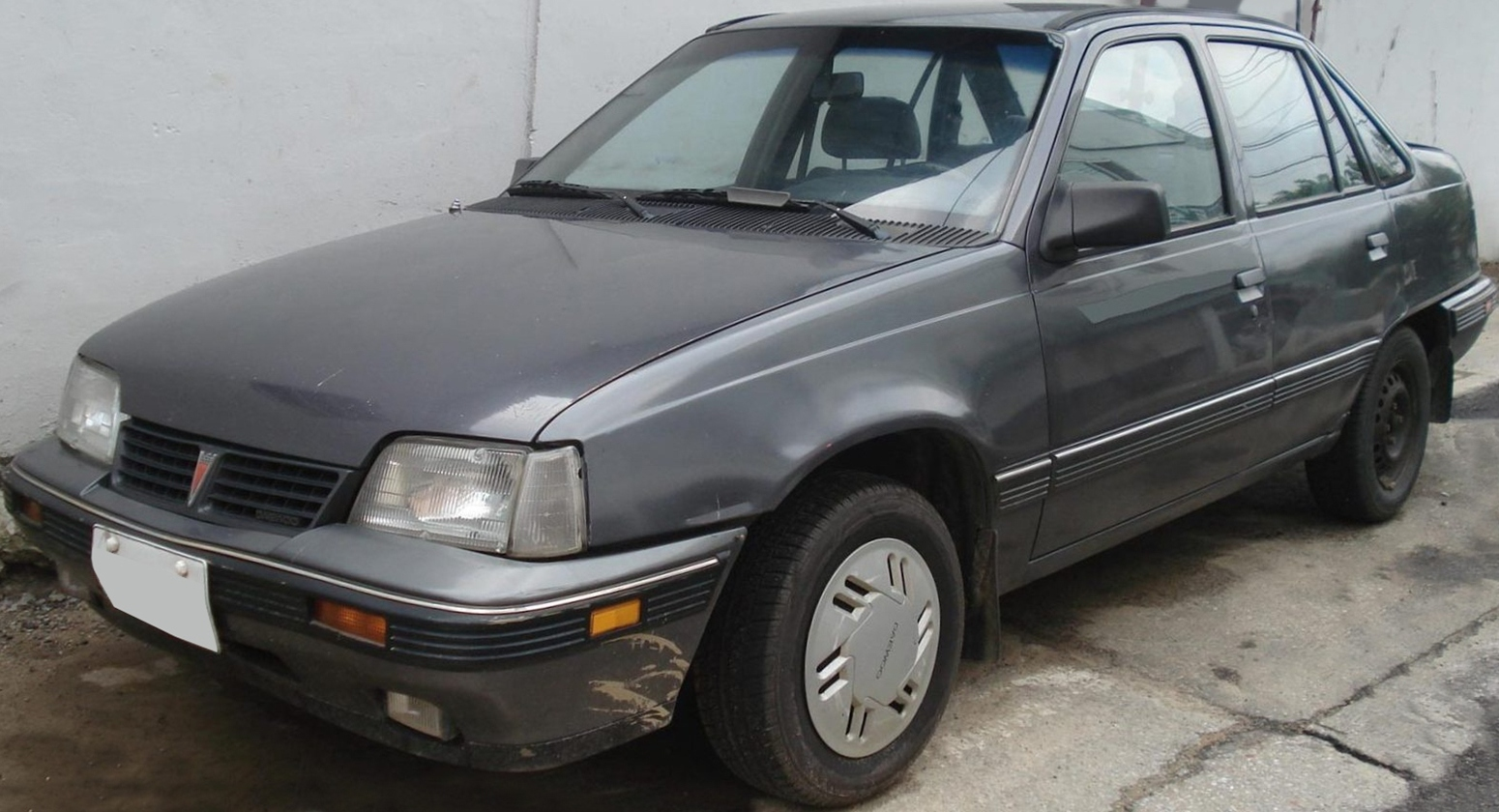
The LeMans, released in 1986, the first Daewoo

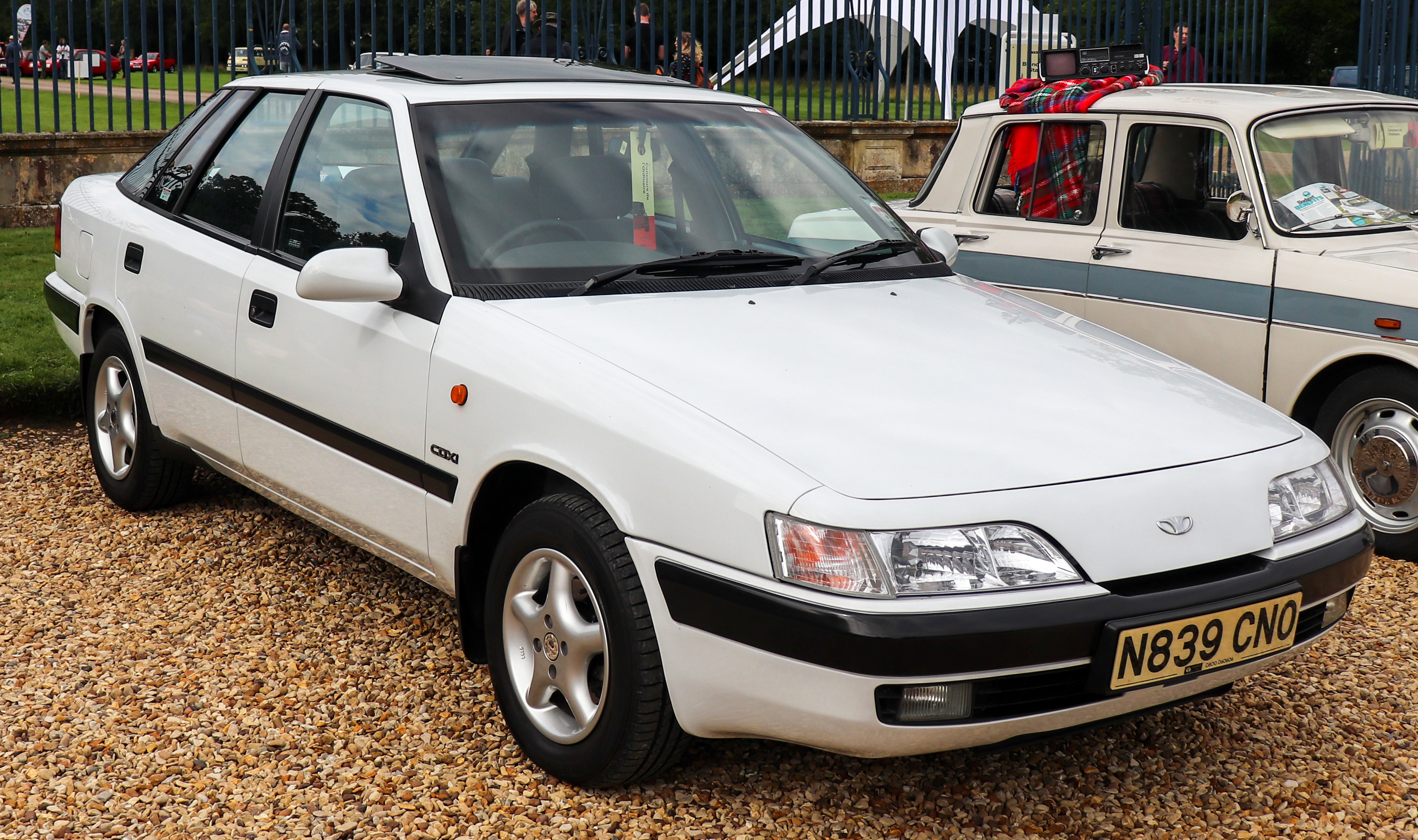
Espero model, designed by Bertone and launched in 1990

The first Daewoo addition was the 1986 LeMans model, based on the Opel Kadett E. Its three-door versions were called the Racer and the five-door version were called Penta-5. This car had an international ambition for GM, as it was sold almost worldwide, as the Pontiac LeMans, Asüna GT and SE, or Passport Optima. This car was produced until February 1997, being one of Daewoo Motor's greatest successes. In 1986, Daewoo also offered a badge-engineered version of the Nissan Vanette.

In 1990, they created the Espero, designed by Bertone, initiating a tradition at Daewoo Motor of models created by Italian designers. Daewoo Heavy Industries (DHI) introduced in 1991, the Tico mini car which was sold at Daewoo Motor's dealers. DHI was also selling since 1981 the Damas minivan and the Labo mini pickup, all three being based on Suzuki models. When the Royale Series range was discontinued, its models were slightly refreshed and offered under the Prince and Super Salon or Brougham model names until respectively 1997 and 1999.

In 1992, the joint-venture with General Motors ended, leaving Daewoo Motor as an independent company.

In 1994, Daewoo started importing the second-generation Honda Legend to replace the discontinued flagship Imperial, under the name of Arcadia. This year, the LeMans also got a slight refresh, and all variants (three, four and five-door) were then sold under the Cielo model name.

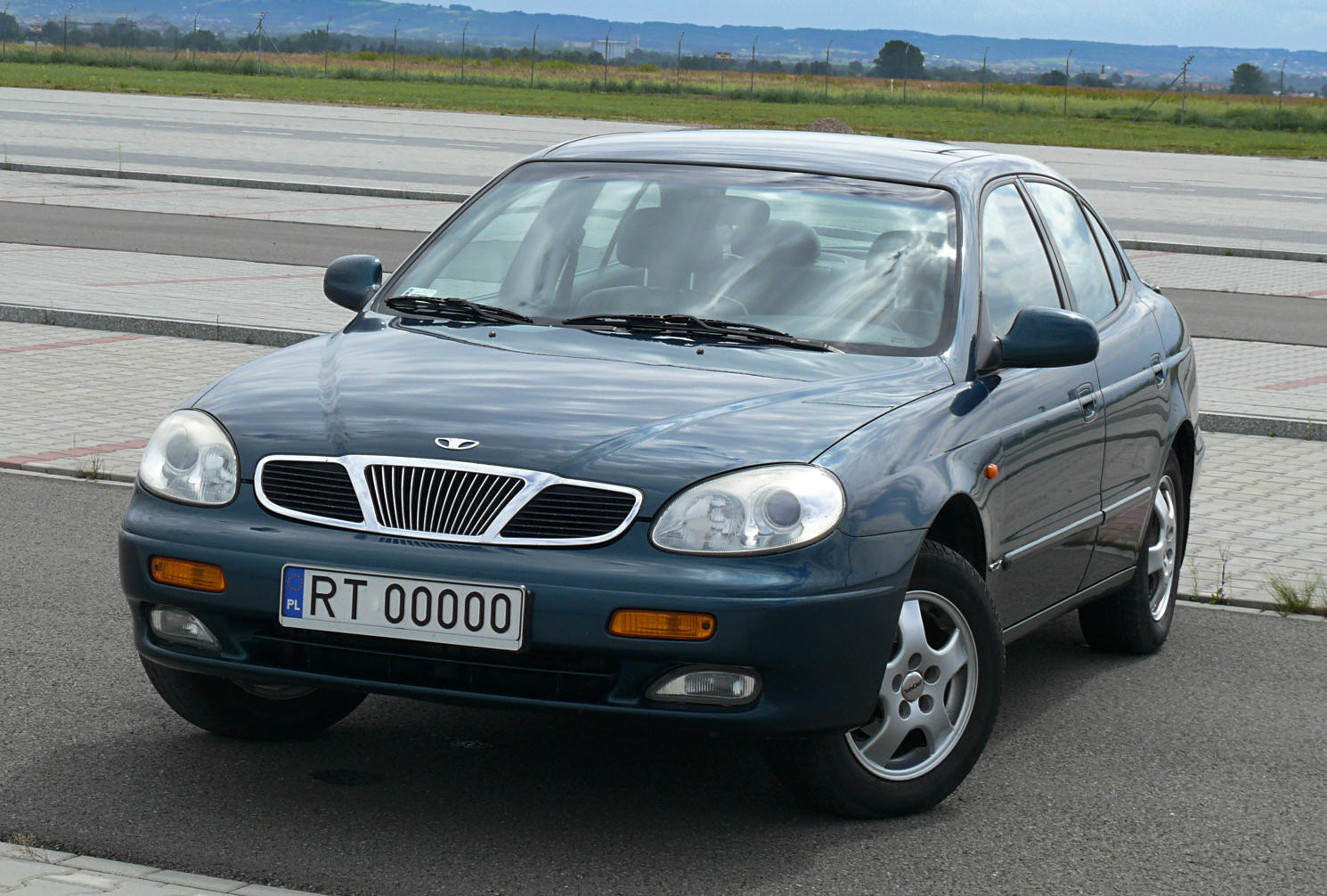
Leganza model, produced 1997–2002

The first authentic Daewoo Motor product, the Lanos, was introduced in late 1997. It spawned three variants: four-door, three-door, called Romeo, and a five-door, the Juliet, being the first model of a whole new family of cars to be created. Styling was by Giorgetto Giugiaro's Italdesign firm. One of its main features was the new three-parts corporate grille, reminiscent of the Daewoo Motor emblem which was to be used on many of the following Daewoo cars. In September 1997, the Nubira was launched, the first Daewoo model to be produced in their new Kunsan motor plant. It was designed by the Italian-based I.DE.A Institute. Also in late 1997, the mid-sized Leganza followed, also designed by Giorgetto Giugiaro, borrowing some styling cues from the existing 1990 Jaguar Kensington concept car.

In 1998, one of Daewoo's best-known cars was introduced, the Matiz. The design was signed by Fabrizio Giugiaro and based on his 1992 "Lucciola" concept car which was initially imagined as a replacement for the Fiat Cinquecento. This car became Daewoo Motor's best-seller for the next four years. In 1999, Daewoo presented the Magnus which was a development of the existing Leganza. Sold in South Korea, alongside the Leganza, until the end of the latter's production in 2002, it existed in two variants: Classic and the sportier Eagle, the Nubira received a facelift in the same year. The Rezzo minivan was also introduced in early 2000. The Matiz got a facelift in 2001. In 2002, the Magnus L6 was introduced, equipped with Daewoo's first straight-six engine, with a new front grille and lamps. The same year, Daewoo also presented the Kalos subcompact, designed to replace the Lanos.

=== Acquisition and later sale of SsangYong Motor ===
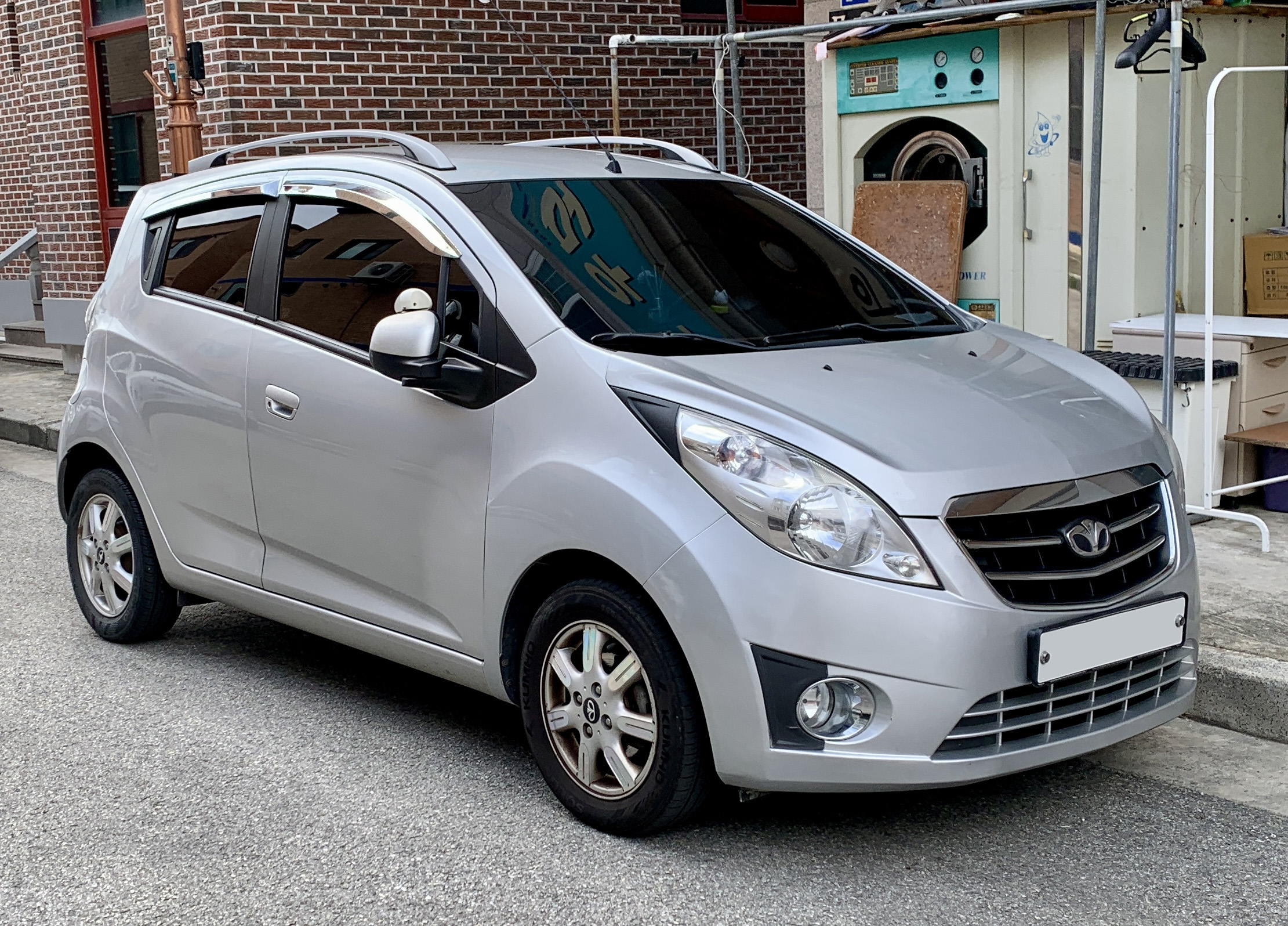
The Matiz was introduced in 1998 and then rebranded Chevrolet when GM acquired Daewoo Motors in 2002

In 1998, after the Asian financial crisis, Daewoo Motor took over the troubled four-wheel-drive specialist SsangYong Motor, only to sell it off again in 2000, because the conglomerate ran into deep financial trouble. Its models were sold under the Daewoo-SsangYong badge in South Korea, contrary to other areas where they were sold under the Daewoo brand name. SsangYong's flagship limousine, the Chairman, was integrated to the Daewoo range, becoming the Daewoo Chairman, with a new three-part Daewoo corporate grille.

=== Sale of Daewoo to General Motors ===
By 1999, the whole Daewoo Group ran into financial trouble, and was forced to sell its automotive division. Candidates for the operation included Hyundai associated with DaimlerChrysler, Ford Motor Company and the GM-Fiat alliance. Finally, General Motors was the one who acquired Daewoo Motor's assets at $1.2 billion in 2002.

In 2002, Daewoo Commercial Vehicle Company was spun off from parent Daewoo Motor Co. Ltd. In 2004, it was acquired by Tata Motors, India's largest passenger automobile and commercial vehicle manufacturing company.

== Overseas operations ==
Daewoo owned a share of AvtoZAZ, an automobile manufacturer based in Ukraine, from 1998 to 2003, establishing the AvtoZAZ-Daewoo joint venture. The CKD assembly of the Daewoo Lanos started in 2002 in Ukraine and later it was adopted for full-scale production as the ZAZ Lanos. A version of the Daewoo-developed Chevrolet Aveo has been assembled for local market at the Chornomorsk subsidiary. Following the bankruptcy of Daewoo Motor in 2001, UkrAVTO corporation bought out the AvtoZAZ holding in 2002. All of the AvtoZAZ manufacturing facilities (most notably MeMZ and the Chornomorsk assembling plant) were reincorporated into ZAZ. The company even adopted a new logo. The Daewoo part in the joint venture was bought out by the Swiss venture Hirsch & CIE in 2003.

In August 1992, Daewoo set up Uz-DaewooAuto, a joint venture in Asaka, Uzbekistan, leveraging the presence of a large local ethnic Korean minority. Currently, the plant assembles the Matiz and the Nexia for both the local market and export, as well as the Lacetti hatchback and sedan for the domestic market only.

In 1994, Daewoo acquired the Automobile Craiova company in Craiova, Romania, which was producing a derivate of the Citroën Axel model, the Oltcit Club. The company's name was changed to "Romanian Daewoo Motor", abbreviated "Rodae", and later "Daewoo Automobile Romania". The entire production facility was refurbished to mainly produce the Cielo model and later, other models. Until 2008, it was producing the Daewoo Cielo, Matiz and Nubira models for the Romanian market, but also car parts for export, such as engines and gearboxes to GM Daewoo and to other companies. The factory was acquired by the Romanian government and sold to Ford in 2007 (the official agreement was signed on 21 March 2008). The production of Daewoo models was stopped in May 2008, and Daewoo Automobile Romania became Ford Romania.

Models produced through the joint venture with
Polish company Fabryka Samochodów Ciężarowych

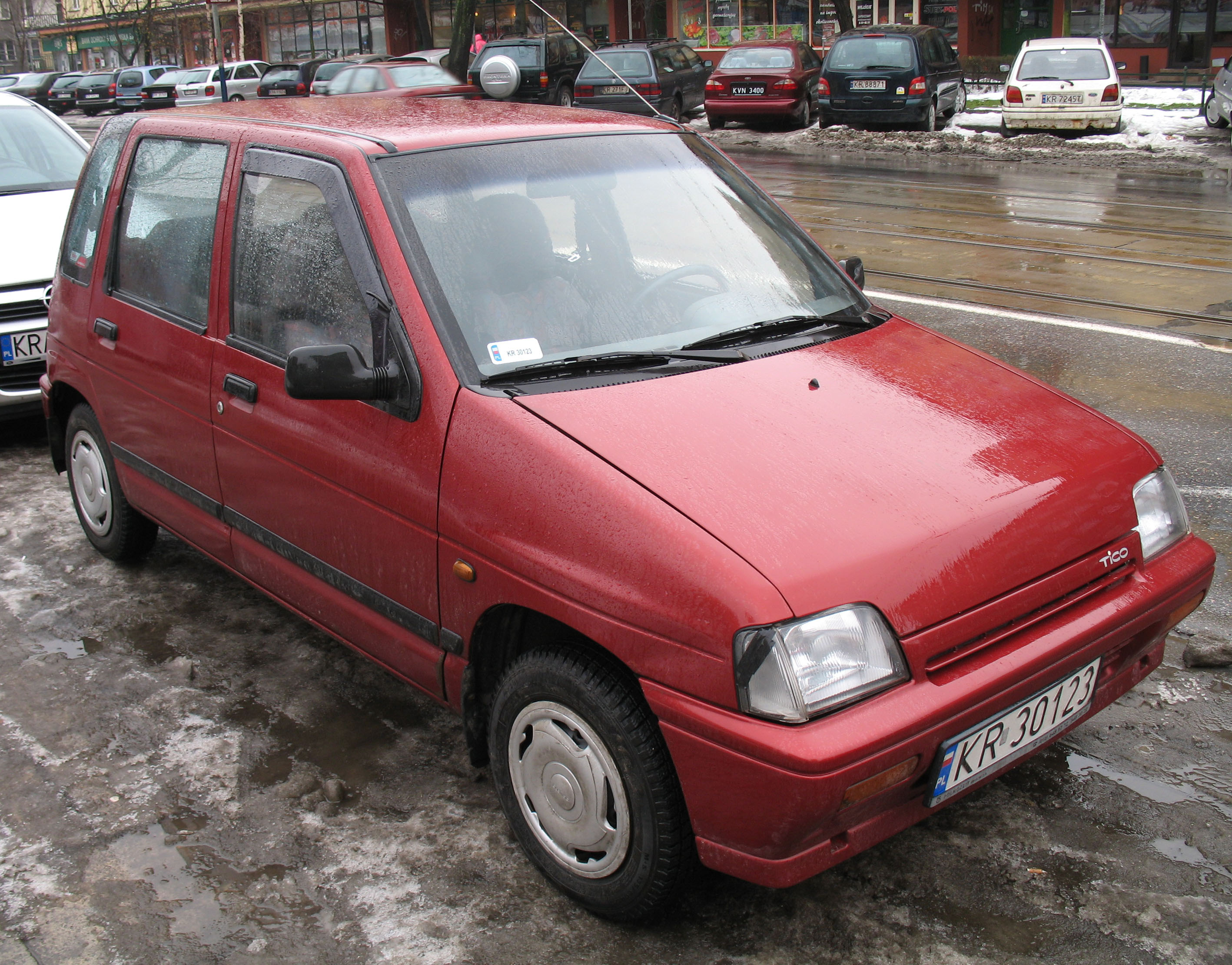
Daewoo Tico became popular in Central Europe

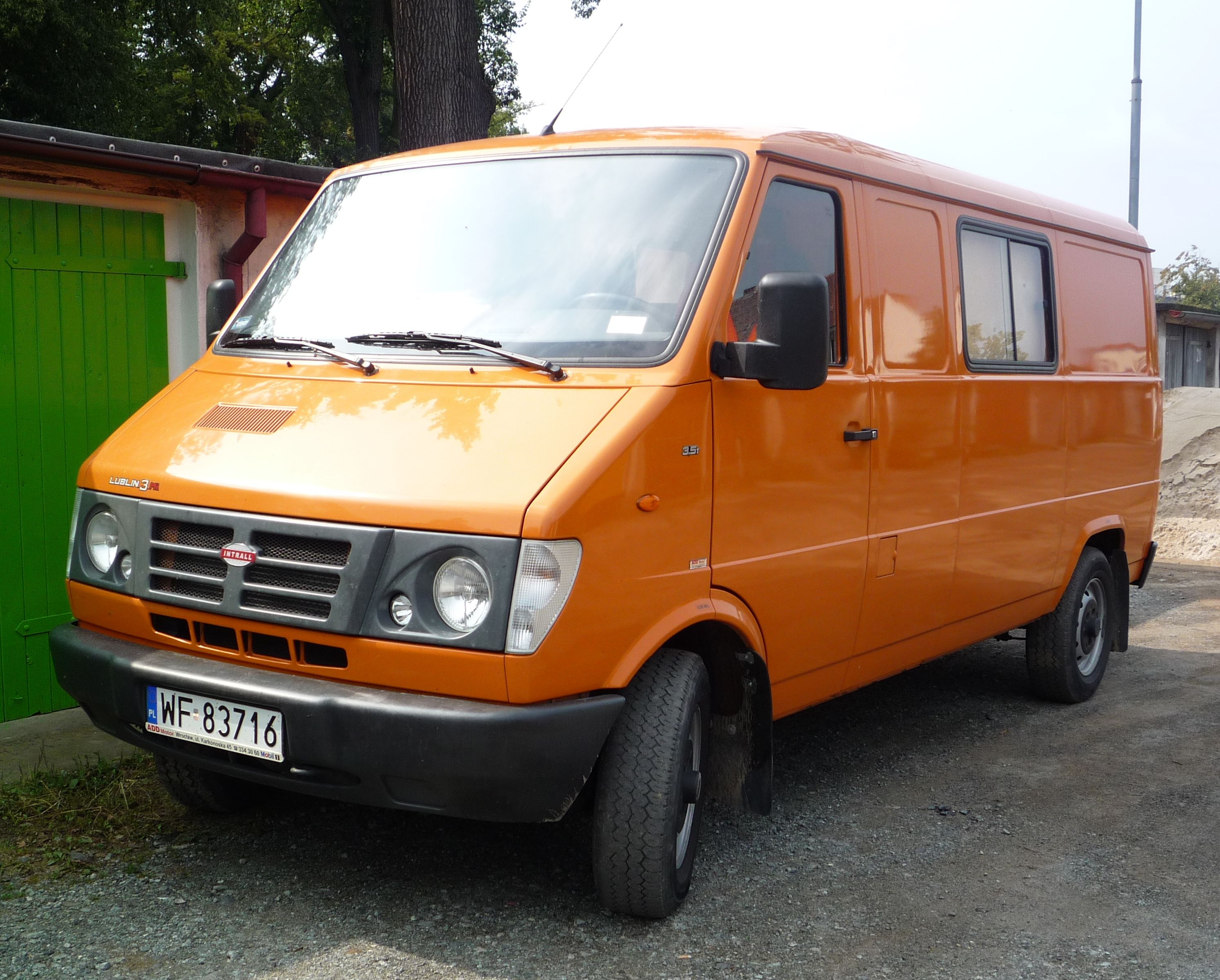
Daewoo Lublin (rebranded FSC) van

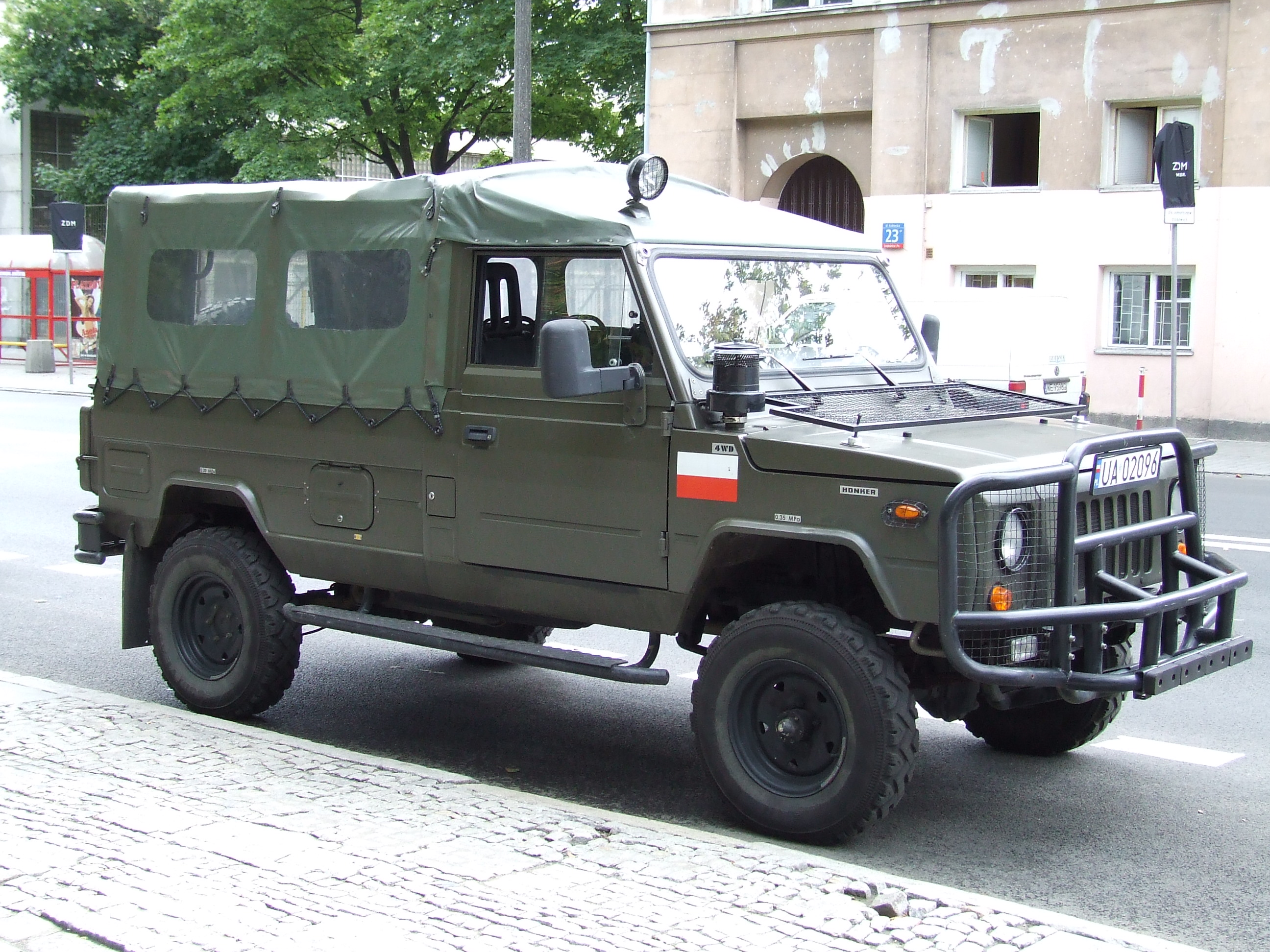
Daewoo Honker (rebranded Tarpan)

Daewoo also invested into Poland's Fabryka Samochodów Osobowych (FSO) in 1995, forming a joint venture called Daewoo-FSO, for the assembly of the Matiz city car, a successor of the Tico, that was very popular in the Central European market. Since January 2005, FSO began to produce Matiz and Lanos under their own trademark.

When making a joint venture with the Polish company Fabryka Samochodów Ciężarowych (FSC) in 1995, Daewoo also created "Daewoo Motor Polska" which produced the Daewoo Lublin van and the Daewoo Honker pick-up truck, based on the former Tarpan Honker. Daewoo Motor Polska and the British van manufacturer LDV developed together during this period of time the Maxus van and, after Daewoo Group's bankruptcy, LDV secured the exclusive rights to the vehicle, purchased the tooling and moved it from Daewoo's plant in Poland to the LDV site in Birmingham. FSC was then sold by Daewoo's new parent company General Motors to the British investment group Intrall and the Honker's design to the Polish company Andoria-Mot.

In 1998, Daewoo Motor bought 50.2% of Avia, a Czech automotive company. The year after, the trade name of the company was changed to Daewoo-Avia. In the same year, the company became the exclusive importer and distributor of Daewoo vehicles for the Czech Republic, and started manufacturing the Polish Lublin van and the new Avia D60/90 series truck range. General Motors' buyout plan did not include Daewoo-Avia in 2001. In the year 2005, the company was overtaken by the investment group Odien Capital Partners and in October 2006, the division of light trucks moved under the concern of Ashok Leyland of India, becoming Avia Ashok Leyland Motors Company (AALM).

In 1998, the low-volume assembly of the Lanos, Nubira and the Leganza started in Taganrog, Russia, at the TagAZ-Doninvest factory The cars were sold on the local market under the Doninvest brand, as the Assol, Orion and Kondor respectively. The project did not have much success, so TagAZ turned to Citroën to produce the Berlingo, and Hyundai to produce the Accent.

Following the General Motors buyout in 2002, Daewoo lost interest in its overseas assets. The deals on supplies of pre-assembled CKD kits ended in 2005 and the facilities were forced to rely on their own production capabilities from that point on.

== Marketing outside South Korea ==
Before the General Motors buyout, Daewoo cars were available in different countries.

Daewoo cars marketed globally

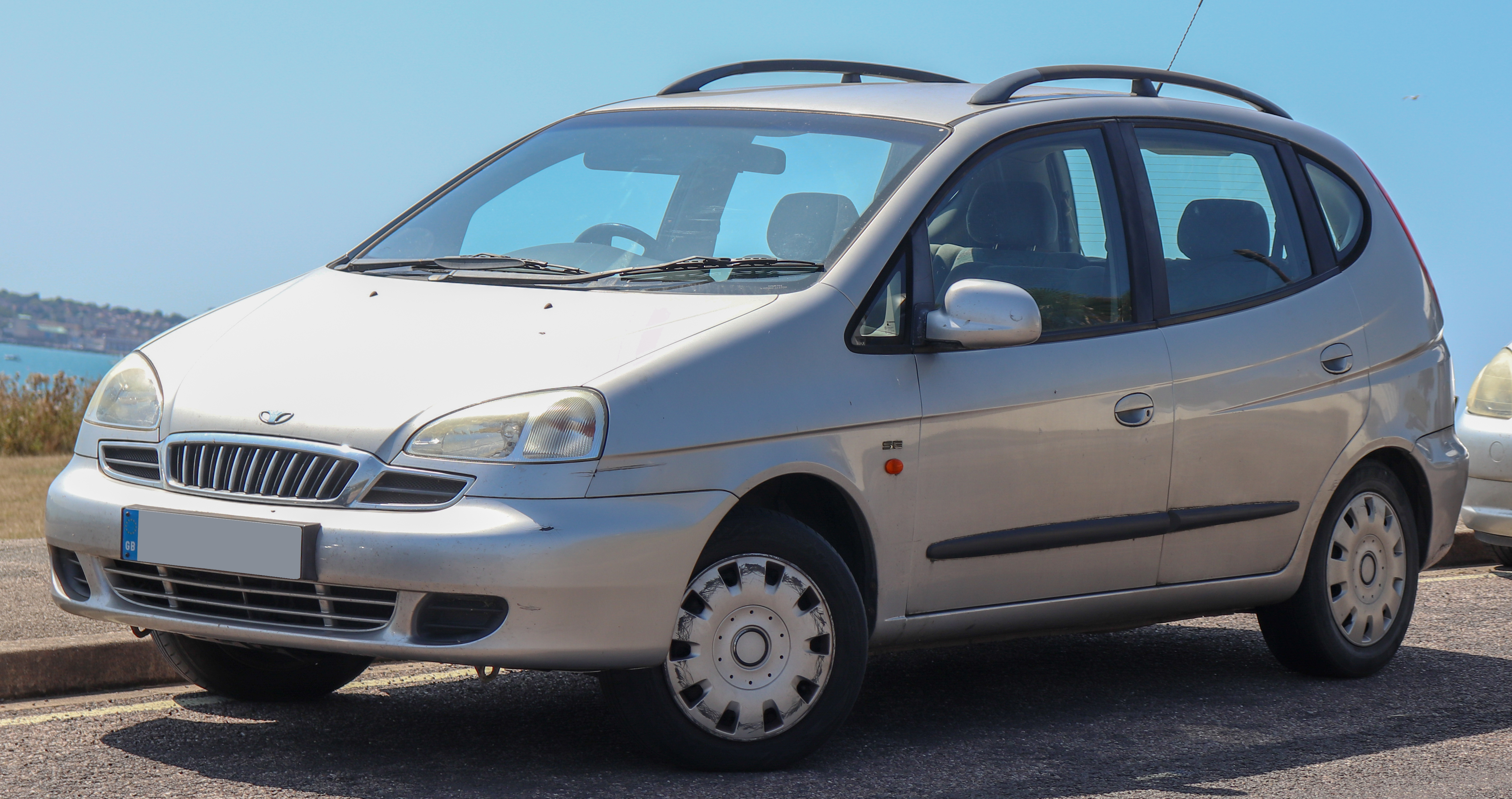
Tacuma

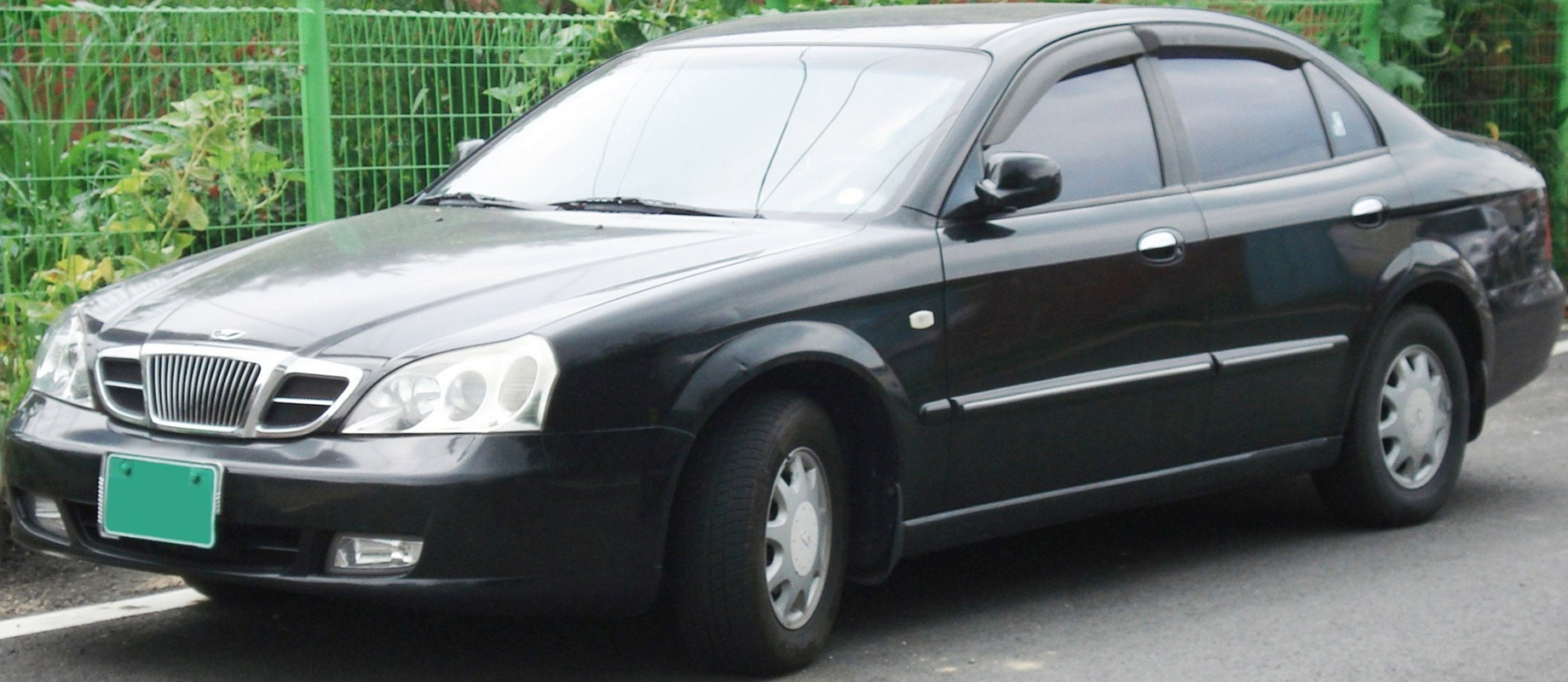
Magnus

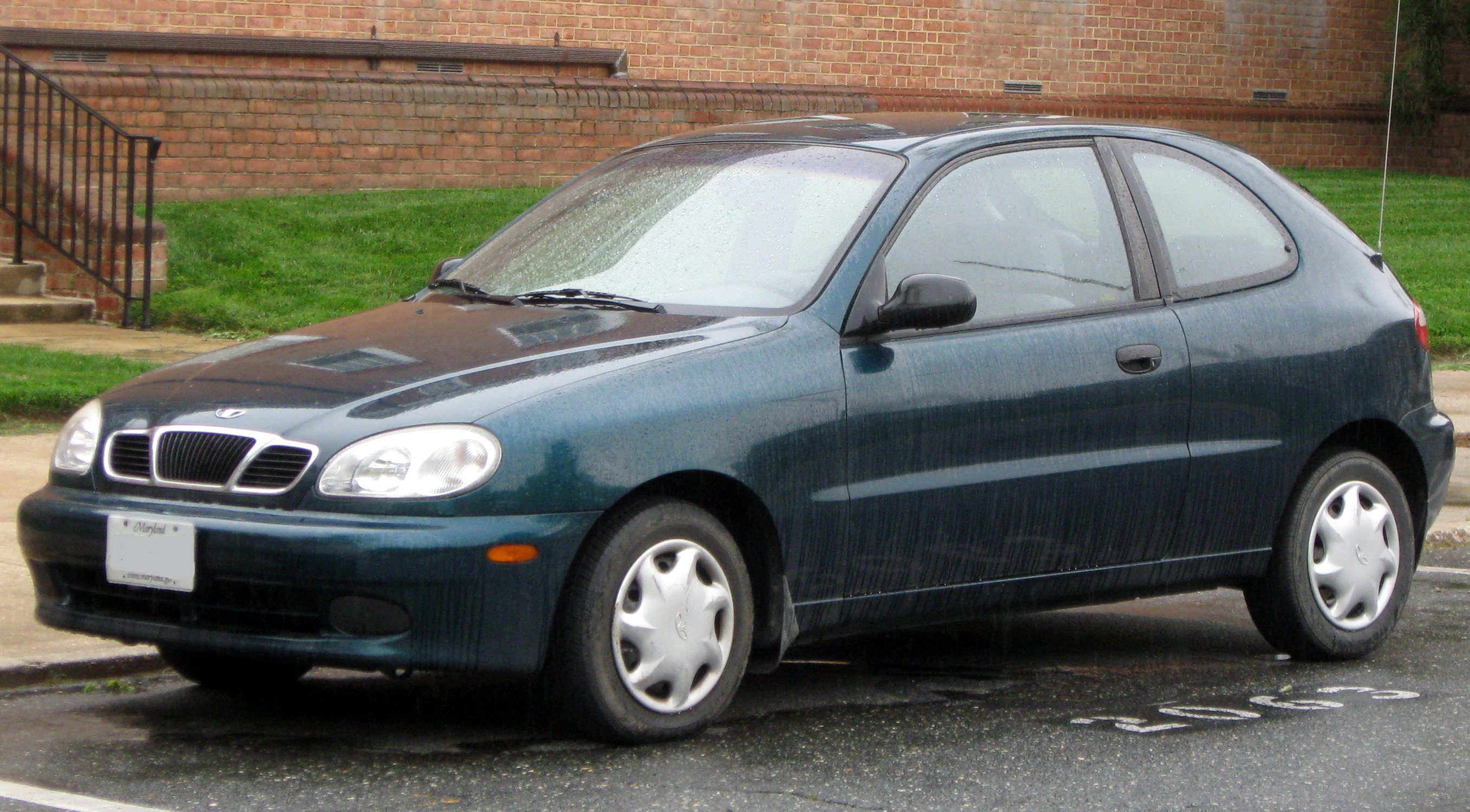
Lanos

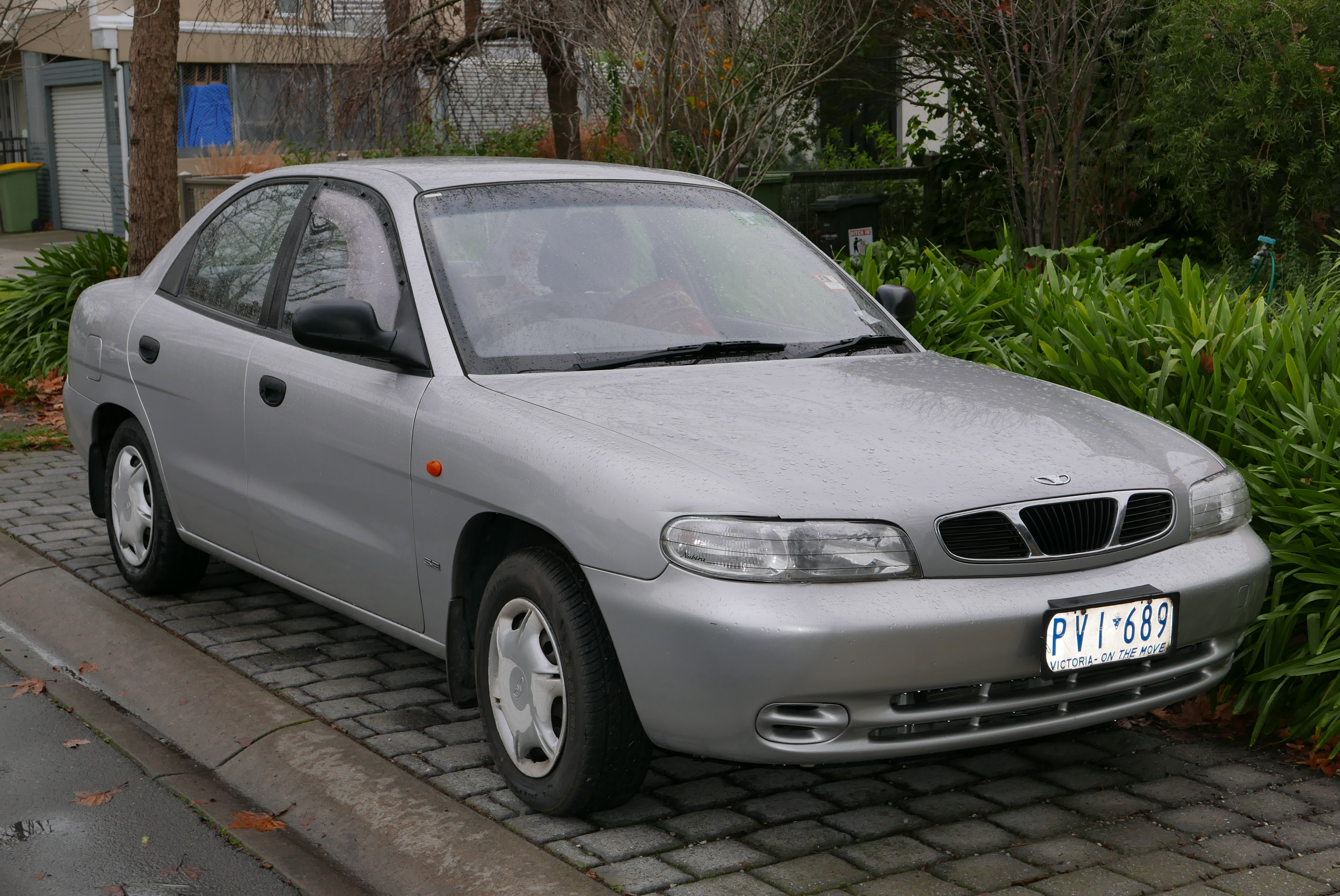
Nubira

In Europe, Daewoo Motor started selling the Espero and the Cielo (or Nexia) from the beginning of 1995, and achieved reasonable sales success, particularly with British buyers, where Daewoo proved popular largely due to its competitive prices and revolutionary dealership network, where cars were sold at fixed prices with a revolutionary aftersales service which included free servicing for three years. In 1996, it gained a 1% share of the new car market in Britain with some 20,000 sales.

The European Daewoo range was updated in 1997 with the launch of the Lanos, Nubira and Leganza from 1997. The Matiz city car was released in 1998, and was a great success for the company, most notably in non-Asian countries such as Italy, where it won many awards such as the Car of the Year award three times in a row, in 1998, 1999 and 2000.

The Rezzo (or Tacuma), Evanda (Magnus) and Kalos models were then released, before the SsangYong-based SUVs : Korando, Musso and Rexton. After the General Motors buyout, the Daewoo models received a new badge, and were sold under the Daewoo name until 2003. The Lacetti was the last car to bear a Daewoo badge in Europe. The other Daewoo models were later rechristened as Chevrolets.

Daewoo cars were also available in the United States and Canada between 1997 and 2002, Australia and many other countries, until Daewoo's bankruptcy. Since Daewoo's withdrawal from many markets, the Lanos was replaced with Chevrolet's as the Aveo, whereas the Nubira and Leganza were given replacements from either the Chevrolet or Suzuki brands.

Chevrolet rebadged Daewoos

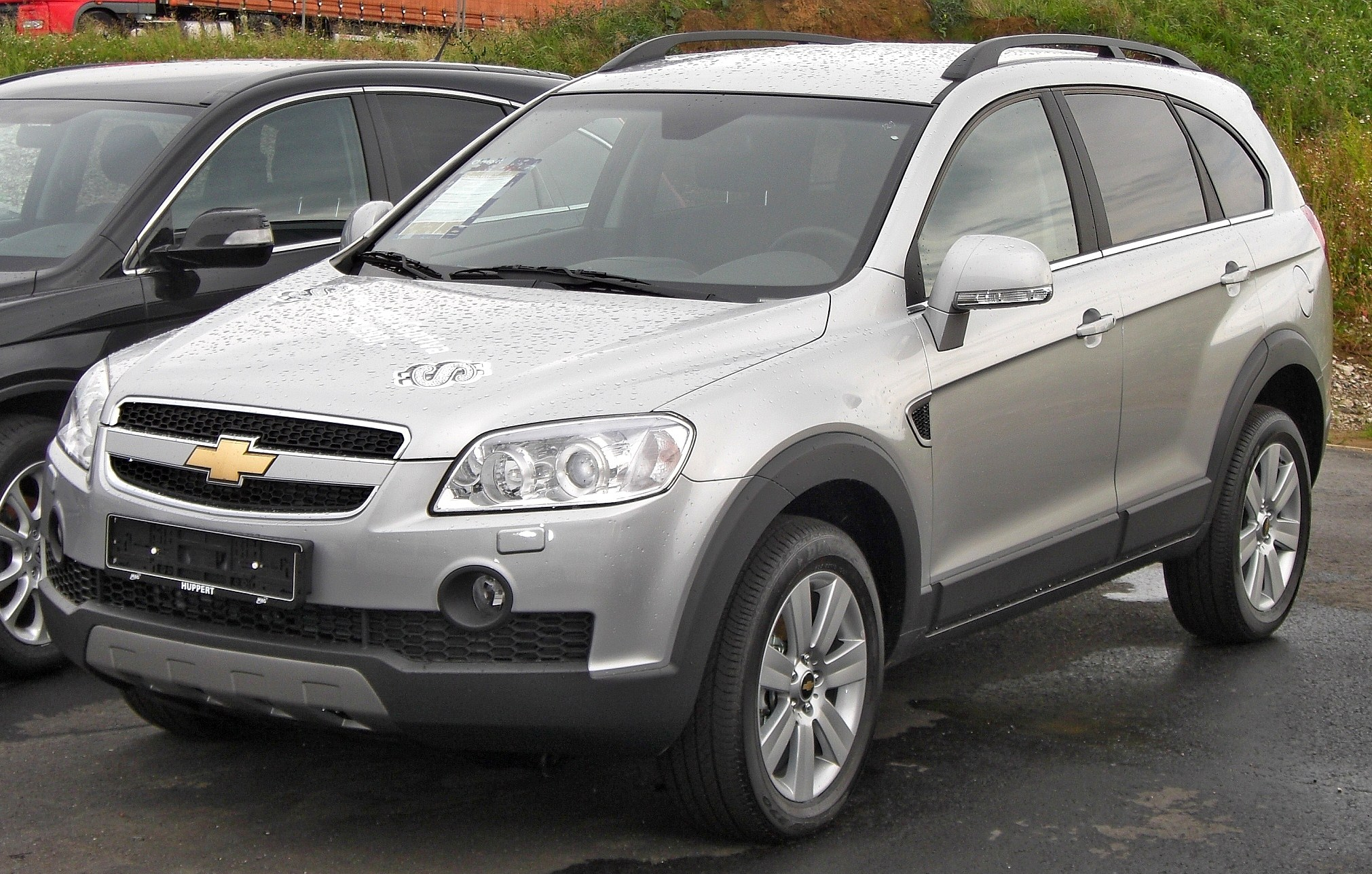
Chevrolet
(Daewoo Winstorm)

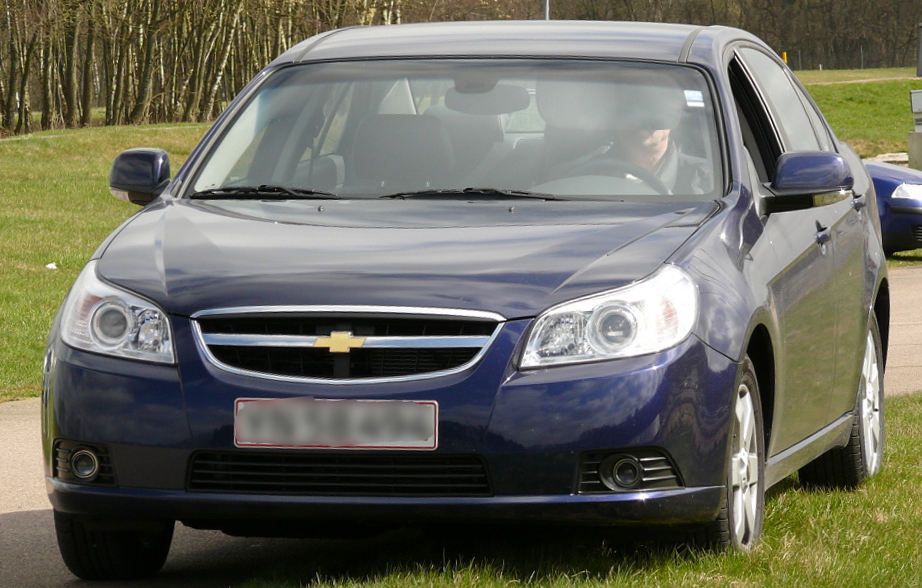
Chevrolet Epica
(Daewoo Tosca)

In January 2005, the Chevrolet brand was introduced in Europe, the whole Daewoo range being simply re-badged as Chevrolet. General Motors' official tagline was that:

“Daewoo has grown up enough to become Chevrolet.”

It was also considered that this new name was an opportunity for Daewoo to become stronger. Unofficially, after Daewoo's bankruptcy, former chairman Kim Woo-Choong's escape and most notably the "Daewoo Affaire" in France (closure and conflagration of the Daewoo-Orion Electronics plant in Longwy, France), the Daewoo brand name had a very bad image, so that GM simply decided to extend the Chevrolet strategy that was already used in most other markets (Canada, India, Israel, Russia) since 2003 to create a real global brand, replacing the Daewoo "dual kidney" with the Chevrolet "bowtie".

The Winstorm and Tosca were presented as the Chevrolet Captiva and the Chevrolet Epica, with the Australian variants being badged as Holdens. Due to their perceived low quality in comparison to Australian built Holden models such as the Commodore, the Captiva is often referred to as a "craptiva" by the general public. Some of the former Daewoo models changed their names after the re-branding decision. Examples are the Matiz which became Chevrolet Spark in some markets (although Chevrolet Matiz was also used), or the Kalos which became the Chevrolet Aveo (alongside the Chevrolet Kalos in other countries) and Holden Barina in Australia. Later, the tendency went towards a uniformisation in the Chevrolet Europe range: the Spark and the Cruze bear the same model names throughout all European markets.

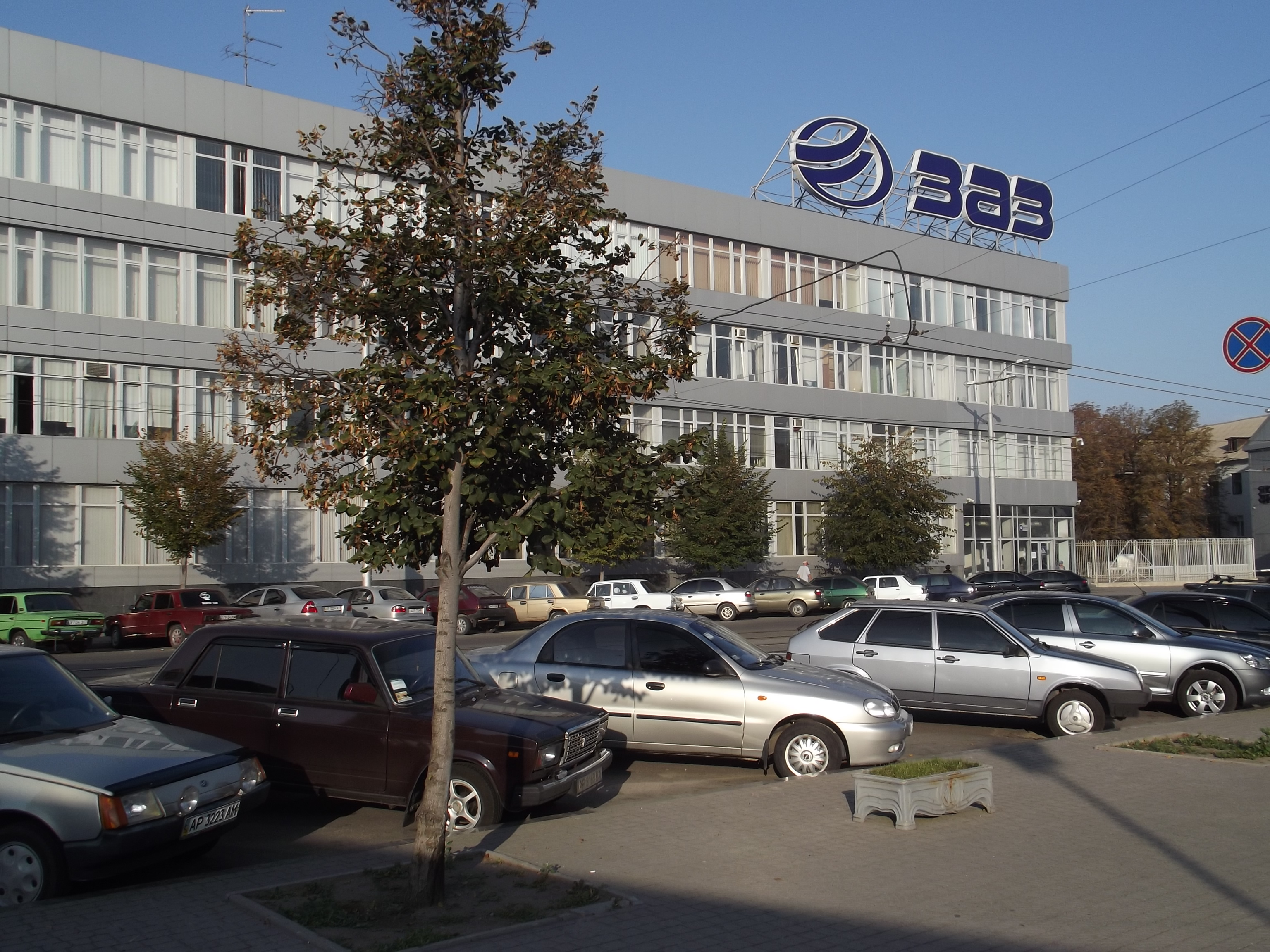
ZAZ factory in Zaporizhzhia, Ukraine

However, besides in South Korea, the Daewoo brand continued to exist in some overseas markets several years after its replacement with Chevrolet, particularly in those countries where Daewoo Motors' former facilities were not part of the General Motors take over plan. Examples of markets where it continued to be used for former Daewoo models are Romania (Daewoo Automobile Romania, until 2008), Ukraine (ZAZ, licensed production, under the Daewoo brand until 2012), Egypt (Daewoo Motor Egypt, until 2012) and, as an exception, Vietnam (Vietnam-Daewoo Motor, which was a wholly owned subsidiary of GM Daewoo, produced models under the Daewoo brand until 2011, when it was discontinued in South Korea).

Furthermore, the brand continued to exist in Uzbekistan (as Uz-DaewooAuto) until 2015, whereas in Poland the Daewoo models continued to be produced (under the Fabryka Samochodów Osobowych) until 2008.

== Emblems, slogans and logos ==
- The first car logo was the "DAEWOO" Daewoo Group logo lettering
- The Royale Series featured a crown-like logo, very similar to the Daewoo Royals football team logo
- A "double D" logo was then used on the cars (as seen on Cielo, Espero, Brougham, Imperial etc.)
- Giugiaro redesigned this logo in 1994 (first seen on the Bucrane concept)
- On the European SUV line (Korando, Musso, Rexton), Daewoo Motor used a new version of this emblem, more squared. Later on, this logo was used by Daewoo Commercial Vehicle Co. Ltd (trucks) and Tata Daewoo
- GM Daewoo emblem in 2002: a modernized evolution of the Daewoo Motor logo

Slogans:

- 1995: "A different kind of car company? That'll be the Daewoo" (UK)
- 1995: "Daewoo, that's who" (US)
- 2000: "Better future"
- 2002: "Driving innovation"
- 2008: "New ways, Always"
