= Kim Woo-choong =

South Korean businessman (1936–2019)

- Born: 19 December 1936; Daegu, Korea, Empire of Japan
- Died: 9 December 2019 (aged 82); Suwon, South Korea
- Education: Yonsei University (BEcon); Chonnam National University (Hon. Ph.D. in Philosophy, 1997)
- Occupation: Businessman
- Known for: Founder of Daewoo
- Status: Deceased
- Criminal charge: Fraud
- Penalty: 10 years in prison

Korean name
- Hangul: 김우중
- Hanja: 金宇中
- RR: Gim Ujung
- MR: Kim Ujung

Kim Woo-choong (Korean: 김우중; 19 December 1936 – 9 December 2019) was a South Korean businessman who was the founder and chairman of Daewoo Group until its collapse in 1999.

== Early life and education ==
Kim Woo-choong was born in Daegu, the son of a former school teacher-turned provincial governor of North Gyeongsang Province, who was kidnapped and taken to North Korea while Kim was a teenager. Kim became a newspaper delivery boy and sold various items. Kim's father was a mentor of South Korean president Park Chung Hee, who eventually supported Kim.

Kim graduated from Kyunggi High School, then finished his education with a Bachelor of Economics at Yonsei University in Seoul.

== Career ==
In 1967, Kim began a small textiles trading corporation with five other associates. Kim rapidly expanded the renamed Daewoo Group by using borrowed money to purchase near-bankrupt companies. By the 1980s, Daewoo ranked as the third-largest chaebol.

By the 1990s, Daewoo ranked second largest in assets and third in revenues. However, due to its poor financial structure; Daewoo plummeted into chaos when the Asian Financial Crisis hit in 1997. It sold off nearly 50 subsidiaries.

By 1999, Daewoo, the second largest conglomerate in South Korea with interests in about 100 countries, went bankrupt, with debts of about US$50 billion at the time. Kim fled to Vietnam, and was charged with accounting fraud worth 41 trillion won (US$43.4 billion), illegally borrowing 9.8 trillion won (US$10.3 billion), and laundering US$3.2 billion out of the country while in exile. He was wanted by Interpol for his irresponsible spending as chairman of Daewoo.

Kim was arrested soon after he returned to South Korea on 14 June 2005, and apologized "for hurting the nation" and accepted full responsibility for the collapse of the group, adding that he was "ready to accept whatever the authorities have in store for him," according to The Chosun Ilbo.

== Writing ==
In August 1989, Kim published 세계는 넓고 할 일은 많다 ("The World Is Wide and There Is a Lot to Do"), a collection of autobiographical essays written primarily for young people. The book sold more than one million copies within six months of publication and was listed in the Korean edition of the Guinness Book of Records as the fastest book to reach that mark. An English translation, Every Street Is Paved with Gold: The Road to Real Success, was published by William Morrow and Company in 1992.

== Criminal charges ==
In May 2006, he was sentenced to 10 years in prison after being found guilty of charges including embezzlement and accounting fraud. In addition, 21 trillion won (US$22 billion) of his fortune was seized and he was fined an additional 10 million won (about US$10,000).

Citing health concerns, his sentence was reduced to 8 1/2 years; on 30 December 2007, he was pardoned by President Roh Moo-hyun. South Korean presidents traditionally hand out pardons for the new year.

== Death ==
On 9 December 2019, Kim died due to pneumonia at Ajou University Hospital in Suwon, 10 days before his 83rd birthday.
