= Tata Daewoo =

South Korean commercial vehicle manufacturer

Tata Daewoo Mobility Co., Ltd.
- Native name: 타타대우모빌리티
- Formerly: Daewoo Commercial Vehicle Co. Ltd (2002–2004); Tata Daewoo Commercial Vehicle Company Limited (2004–2024)
- Type: Subsidiary
- Industry: Automotive
- Founded: 2002; 24 years ago
- Headquarters: Gunsan, South Korea
- Key people: Natarajan Chandrasekaran (chairman); Kim Tae -sung (president & CEO)
- Products: Commercial vehicles
- Parent: Tata Motors (2004–present)
- Website: tata-daewoo.com

- Tata Daewoo
- Hangul: 타타대우모빌리티
- Hanja: 타타大宇모빌리티
- RR: Tata Daeu mobilliti
- MR: T'at'a Taeu mobillit'i

Tata Daewoo Mobility Co., Ltd. is a commercial vehicle manufacturer headquartered in Gunsan, North Jeolla Province, South Korea, and a wholly owned subsidiary of Tata Motors. It is the second-largest heavy commercial vehicle manufacturer in South Korea.

== History ==
The company was established in 2002 as "Daewoo Commercial Vehicle Co. Ltd", after it was spun off from parent Daewoo Motors.

In 2004 it was acquired by Tata Motors, India's largest passenger automobile and commercial vehicle manufacturing company.

Tata Daewoo Korea and Afzal Motors-Pakistan signed a Technical Assistance Agreement on 12 December 2005 in Pakistan. The Afzal Motors plant in Pakistan was inaugurated by Prime Minister Shaukat Aziz on 8 January 2007. It assembled Truck Chassis and Daewoo Dump Trucks.

In 2013, the Vehicular Authority of South Korea ordered that the trucks sold by Tata Daewoo Commercial Vehicles be recalled due to a steering failure. The 3,276 trucks sold in the country were repaired and came back in service.

Tata Daewoo-Korea and BadanBas-Malaysia signed a Technical Assistance Agreement in May 2015 in Malaysia. In 2017, Tata-Daewoo began to sell their trucks under the Daewoo brand in South Korea.

In November 2024, Tata Daewoo Commercial Vehicle Company rebranded as Tata Daewoo Mobility.

== Leadership ==
- Choi Bong-ho (2002–2003)
- Chae Kwang-ok (2003–2009)
- Kim Jong-sik (2009–2012)
- Kim Kwan-kyu (2012–2019)
- Kim Bang-shin (2019–2025)
- Kim Tae-sung (2025–present)

== Products ==
=== Current ===
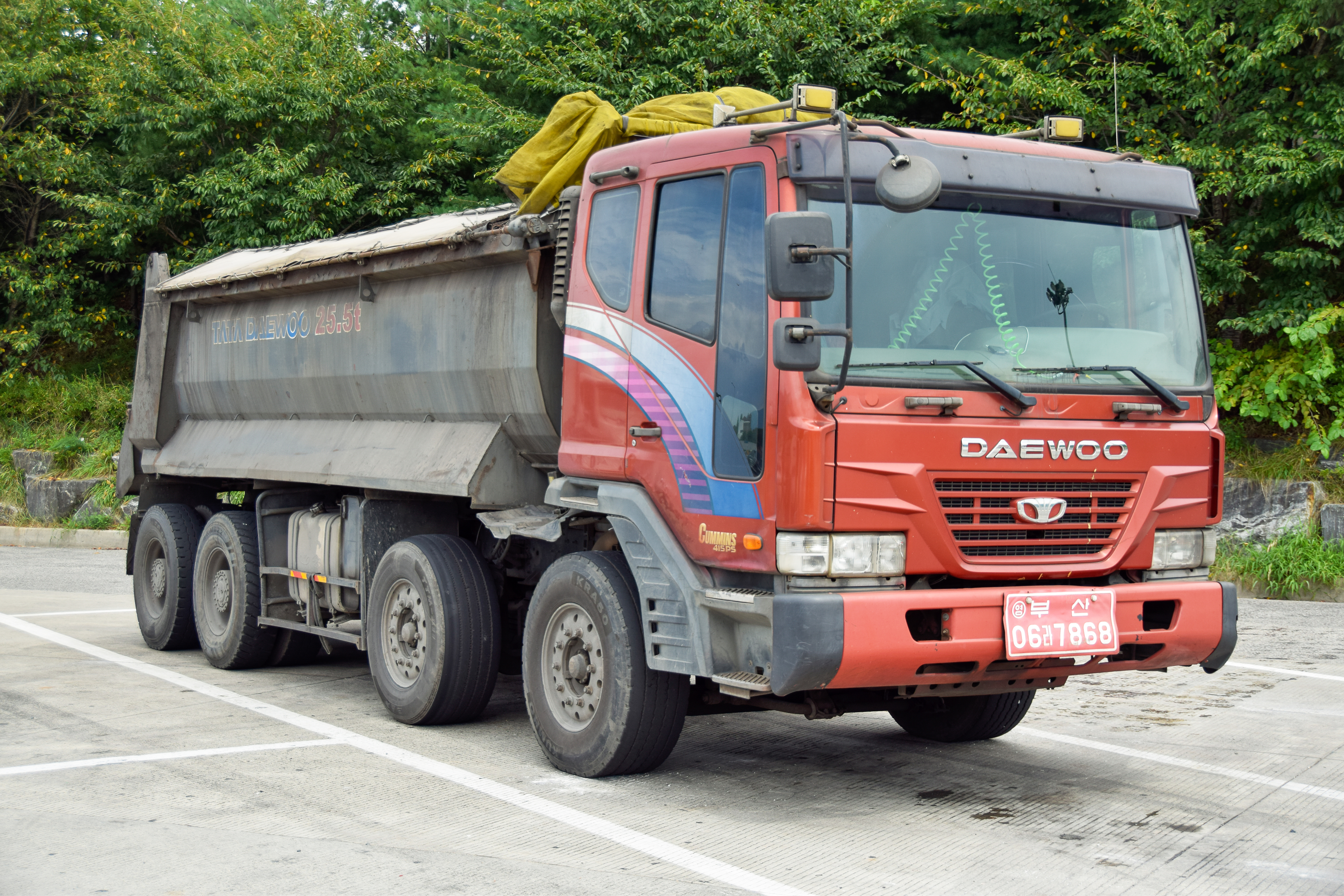
Tata Daewoo Novus 8×4

- Novus Series (Tata Daewoo, 2004)
- DEXEN (formerly 'The CEN'), (2020~Present)
- MAXEN (2022~Present)
- KUXEN (2022~Present)
- GIXEN (2025) - Electric version of DEXEN
- HIXEN (2026)

=== Discontinued ===
- GMK/Chevrolet/Isuzu Truck - CKD provided by Saehan Motor Company, 1971 (now GM Korea)
- SMC Truck Isuzu Truck- CKD provided by Saehan Motor Company, 1976 (now GM Korea)
- Daewoo/Isuzu Elf Truck - CKD provided by Saehan Motor Company, 1976 (now GM Korea).
- Daewoo/Isuzu Light Truck - CKD provided by Saehan Motor Company (now GM Korea), with assistance from Isuzu, 1983.
- Daewoo/Isuzu Truck New Elf Model - CKD provided by Daewoo Motor Company (now GM Korea), with assistance from Isuzu, 1986.
- Daewoo Truck New Model - CKD provided by Daewoo Motor Company (now GM Korea), with assistance from Isuzu, 1986.
- Daewoo Truck Super New Model - Own development from Daewoo Motor Company Design Department, 1993.
- Daewoo Chasedae Truck (Next Generation) - Own development from Daewoo Motor Company Design Department, 1995.
- Prima Series (2009–2022)

In all of its recent versions, these trucks are engined by a Euro VI emissions standard engines.
