= Saehan Camina =

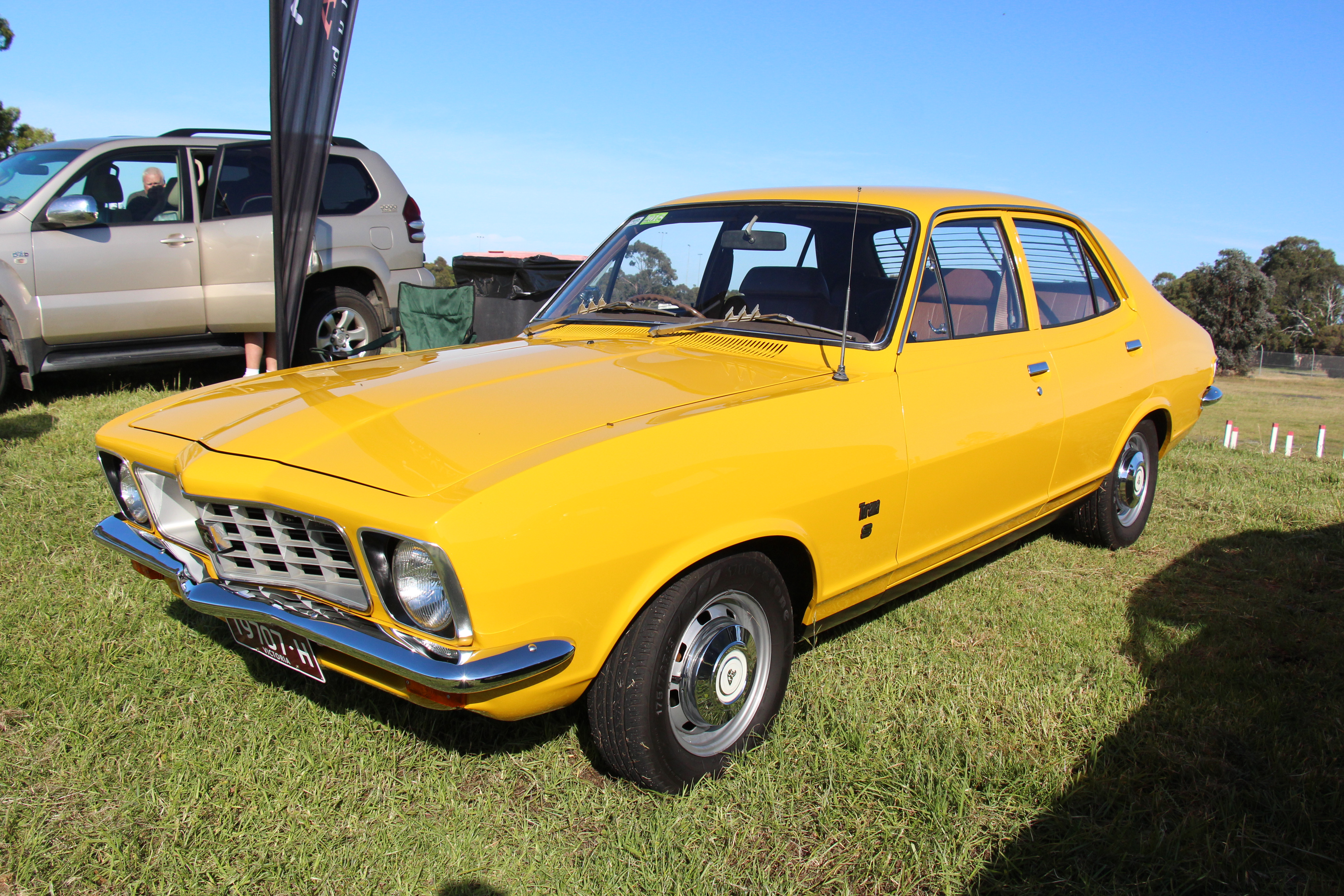
- The Holden Torana (LJ), which the Chevrolet 1700 and Camina was heavily based on.

Overview
- Manufacturer: GM Korea (1972–1976); Saehan Motors (1976–1977)
- Also called: Chevrolet 1700 (시보레 1700); GMK Caravan (Wagon model, 1972–76); Saehan Caravan (Wagon model, 1976–79)
- Production: November 1972 – April 1976 (Chevrolet 1700); April 1976 – November 1977 (Saehan Camina); April 1976 – March 1979 (Saehan Caravan)
- Assembly: South Korea: Bupyeong

Body and chassis
- Body style: 4-door sedan; 5-door station wagon
- Layout: FR layout
- Related: Holden Torana (LJ)

Powertrain
- Engine: 1.7 L Opel 17N I4; 1.5 L Opel 15N I4
- Transmission: 4-speed manual

Chronology
- Successor: Saehan Gemini

The Saehan Camina (Korean: 새한 카미나) is a passenger car built by General Motors Korea (later Saehan Motor Company) between 1972 and 1979, it was a reworked version of the Australian market 1971 Holden Torana.

== Background ==
After Toyota abandoned the joint venture between them and Shinjin Motors, General Motors stepped in to form General Motors Korea with Shinjin Motors. The end result was a slightly reworked version of the LJ Holden Torana, production commenced in 1972, lasting until 1976 when it was renamed to Saehan Motors when Shinjin sold its 50% stake in GMK to the Korea Development Bank due to Financial Troubles that the company faced.

It would be the first Korean car presentation, along with the GMK Rekord, at the Westin Chosun Hotel in 1972.

Unlike the original Holden Torana, there was a 5-door station wagon that was never sold by Holden. Competition was expected to be fierce, but it sold poorly compared to its domestic rivals, Kia's Fiat 124 and Hyundai's Ford Cortina. The main deterrent to sales was the high government taxes imposed by the government in relation to this class of vehicle - the automobile taxation system of South Korea greatly favours engines of less than 1.5 litres displacement. The car was also perceived to suffer from high fuel consumption, while the suspension was seen as unsuitable for Korean roads and poor fuel economy during the 1970s contributed to its lower than expected sales.

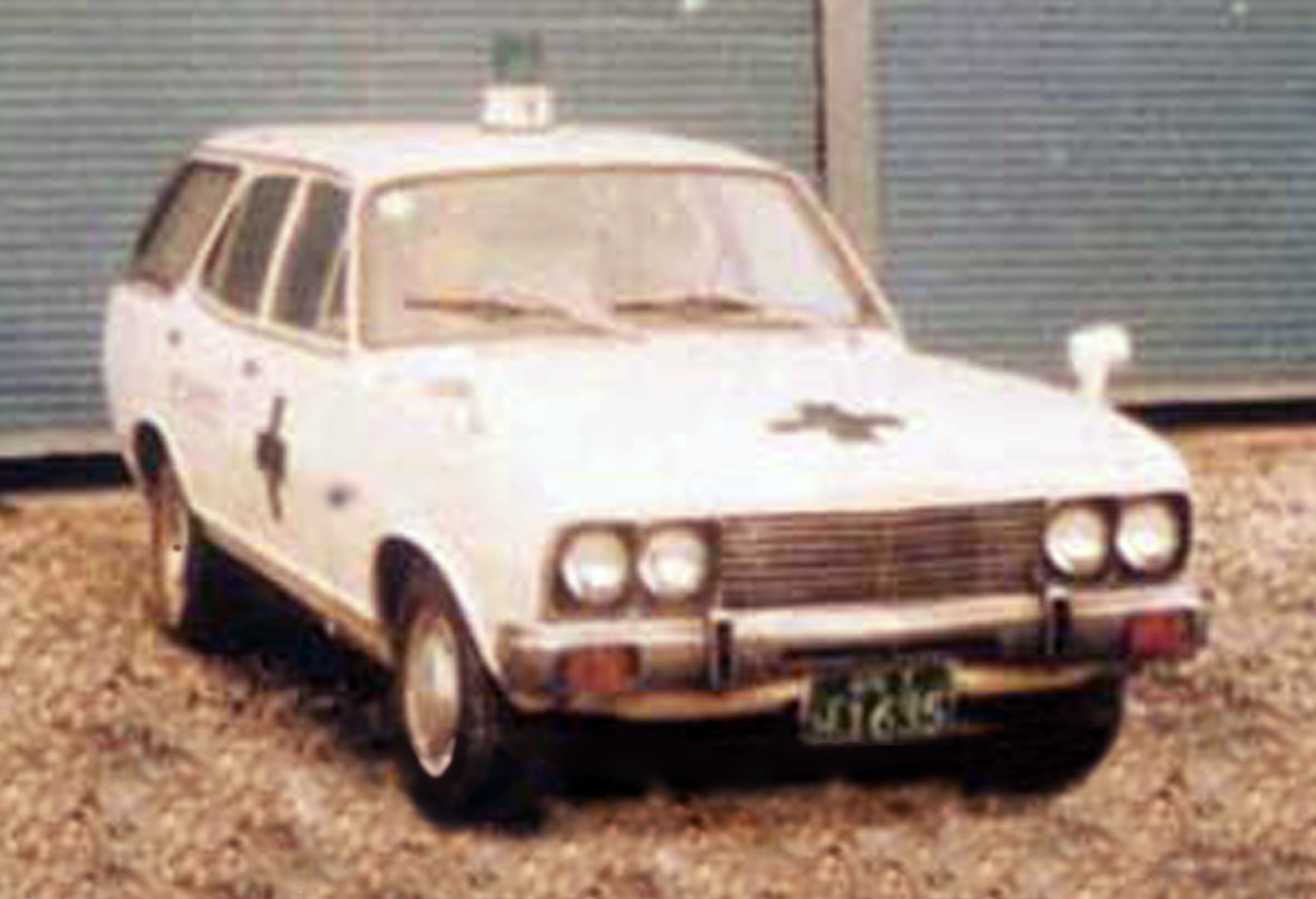
Saehan Caravan used as ambulance, 1980

Currently, the only known surviving example of a Chevrolet 1700 is a yellow taxi owned by collector Baek Joong-gil in the Kumho Classic Car collection.

Due to the poor sales of Chevrolet 1700, the car was revised as the Camina in April 1976, receiving a new grille and a four headlight upgrade for the wagon, using some parts from contemporary Opel models (General Motors Korea was sold to Saehan Motors in 1976 after management troubles). However, the Chevrolet version continued to sell alongside it until both models were discontinued in 1978. A smaller 1492-cc engine, imported directly from Opel Germany, was fitted to deliver better fuel economy than its Hyundai and Kia competitors, but sales did not recover with only 992 cars sold in two years. The 1.5-liter engine offered 66 PS (49 kW), enough for a top speed of 140 km/h (87 mph) for the sedan. The station wagon, which retained the 1700 engine, was now called the Saehan Caravan (Korean: 새한 캬라반); 966 of these were sold from January 1976 until March 1979. An ambulance version arrived in April 1976. The 1700 and Camina replacement, the 1977 Saehan Gemini, was a rebadged Isuzu Gemini fitted with the Opel 1492 engine (the Australian version of the Isuzu Gemini which was sold as the Holden Gemini).
