= Opel Rekord Series E =

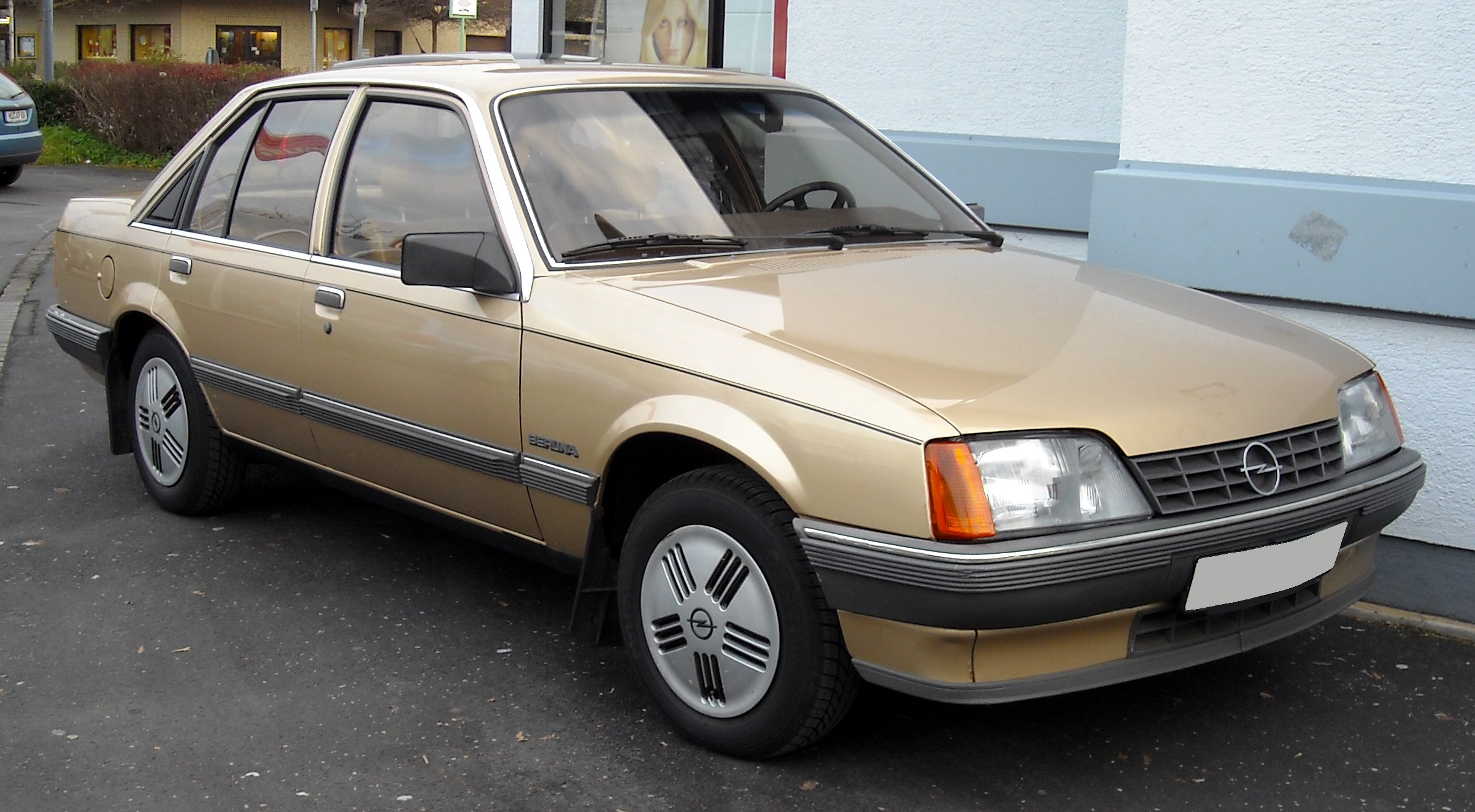

Overview
- Manufacturer: Opel (General Motors)
- Also called: Chevrolet Rekord (ZA); Daewoo Royale (ROK); Saehan Rekord (ROK); Vauxhall Carlton (UK)
- Production: August 1977 – August 1986; 1978–1994 (South Africa); 1980–1988 (Indonesia, 3-d panel van only)
- Assembly: Germany: Rüsselsheim (Opel Automobile); Indonesia: Jakarta (PT General Motor); South Korea: Bupyeong (Saehan); South Africa: Port Elizabeth (GMSA/Delta)
- Designer: George Gallion; Henry Haga

Body and chassis
- Class: Large family car (D)
- Body style: 2/4-door saloon 3/5-door estate 3-door panel van
- Layout: FR layout
- Platform: GM V platform
- Related: Holden Commodore; Opel Commodore; Vauxhall Viceroy

Chronology
- Predecessor: Opel Rekord Series D
- Successor: Opel Omega

The Opel Rekord Series E is a large family car that replaced the Rekord D on Opel's Rüsselsheim production lines in August 1977, following the end of the summer vacation plant shut-down. It shared its wheelbase and inherited most of its engines from its predecessor, but the bodies were completely new. The corresponding Opel Commodore C was essentially identical to the Rekord E, but fitted with 6-cylinder engines.

In October 1982, the Rekord E was extensively reworked, retaining the central portion of the body, the same windows and the principal elements of the substructure, but with redesigned front and back ends and with several significant new engines. The pre- and post-facelift versions are commonly referred to as the E1 and E2, respectively.

The Rekord E's nine-year production run was far longer than that of any previous generation of Opel Rekord. It became the third Opel Rekord to exceed a million units produced, but it took longer to reach that target than its predecessor — bearing in mind this total now also included its Vauxhall Carlton sister model produced for the UK market. By then, large increases in fuel prices had persuaded many middle-market customers to downsize. The Opel Rekord was perceived as a large family car even in its West German home market where family cars were traditionally a little larger than in southern Europe. The Rekord (and later the Omega) would also come under pressure from the entry-level models of German luxury brands such as BMW, Audi and Mercedes-Benz — the beginning of an industry trend which would, by the end of the 1990s, see mass market brands abandon the D/E-segment completely.

The Rekord E was sold in the UK badged as the Vauxhall Carlton, initially identified by a reworked bonnet panel, and after 1982 differentiated by little more than the badges. Despite the UK branding, the Carltons were all produced at Rüsselsheim, leaving Vauxhall's British plants to concentrate on Cavaliers, Chevettes, Vivas and their successors.

The car was developed by Opel and a direct development of a succession of previous Opel Rekords, but during the closing decades of the twentieth century General Motors displayed a growing strategic interest in internationalizing their products, and the underpinnings of the Rekord E became known as the General Motors "V-platform", and various derivative versions of the Rekord E were manufactured by other GM divisions around the world.

== Opel Rekord E1 (1977–1982) ==
Opel Rekord Series E1
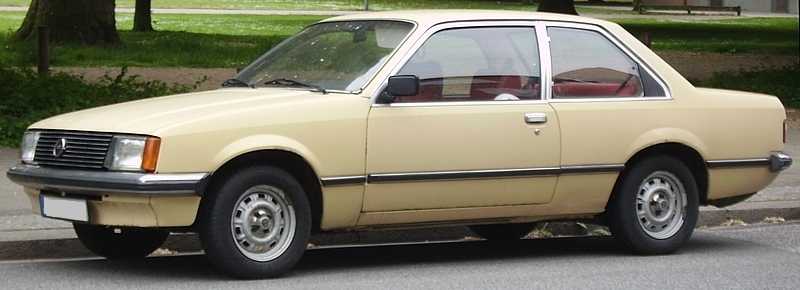

Overview
- Manufacturer: Opel
- Production: 1977–1982; 962,218 units

Body and chassis
- Body style: 2/4-door saloon 3/5-door estate 3-door panel van

Powertrain
- Engine: Petrol: 1,698 cc I4 (till 1980); 1,897 cc I4; 1,979 cc I4; Diesel: 1,998 cc I4 (Italy and Belgium); 2,068 cc I4 (till 1978); 2,260 cc I4 (from 1978)
- Transmission: 4-speed manual 3-speed automatic optional (not offered with the 1.7)

Dimensions
- Wheelbase: 2,670 mm (105.1 in)
- Length: 4,595 mm (180.9 in) sedan; 4,620 mm (181.9 in) estate
- Width: 1,725 mm (67.9 in)

=== The car ===
Despite sharing its wheelbase and, at least initially, its engine range with the car it replaced, the Opel Rekord E as launched at the 1977 Frankfurt Motor Show was slightly wider, longer, higher and, with larger windows, significantly heavier than the Opel Rekord D. Inside it was noticeably more spacious.

Plaudits for the technologically impressive, though commercially unsuccessful, NSU Ro 80 introduced in 1968 had revived interest in aerodynamics among West German automakers, and the Rekord E came with claims of an improved drag coefficient of 0.42 C_{d}.) In 1982, the facelifted "E2" version was released with drag coefficient of 0.36. Of a generally smoother appearance, this version featured redesigned, more aerodynamic front and rear ends, and a reshuffling of engines and equipment levels. The E2 Vauxhall Carltons were distinguishable from Opel Rekords only by their badging, with no sheet metal differences present.

=== Design ===
==== Bodywork ====
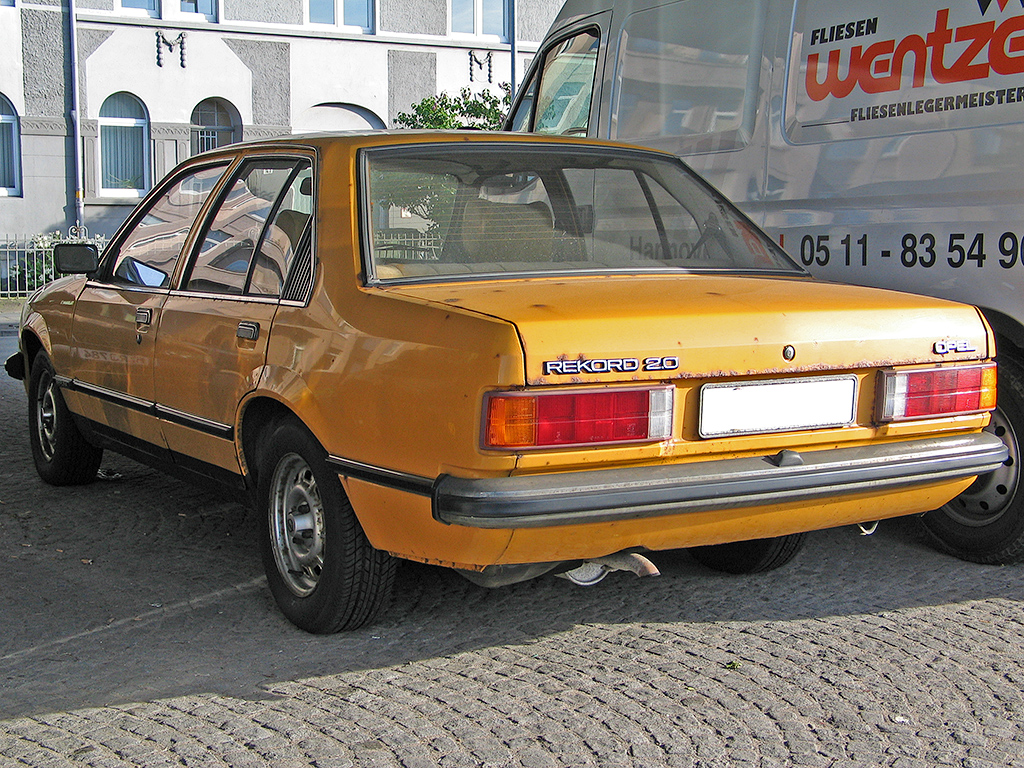
By this stage most Opel Rekords came with four doors

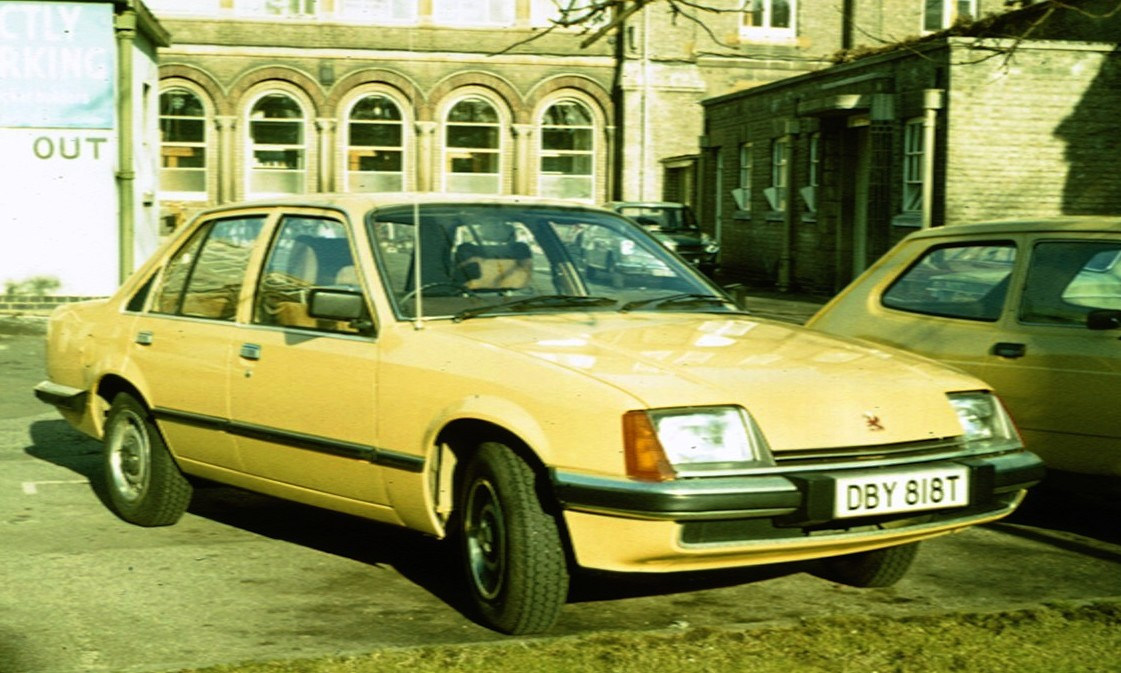
For UK consumers, the Rekord E1–based Vauxhall Carlton was identified by a "droop snoot" bonnet. The Rüsselsheim plant produced both right hand drive Rekords and Carltons which, until 1981, competed with each other in the United Kingdom.

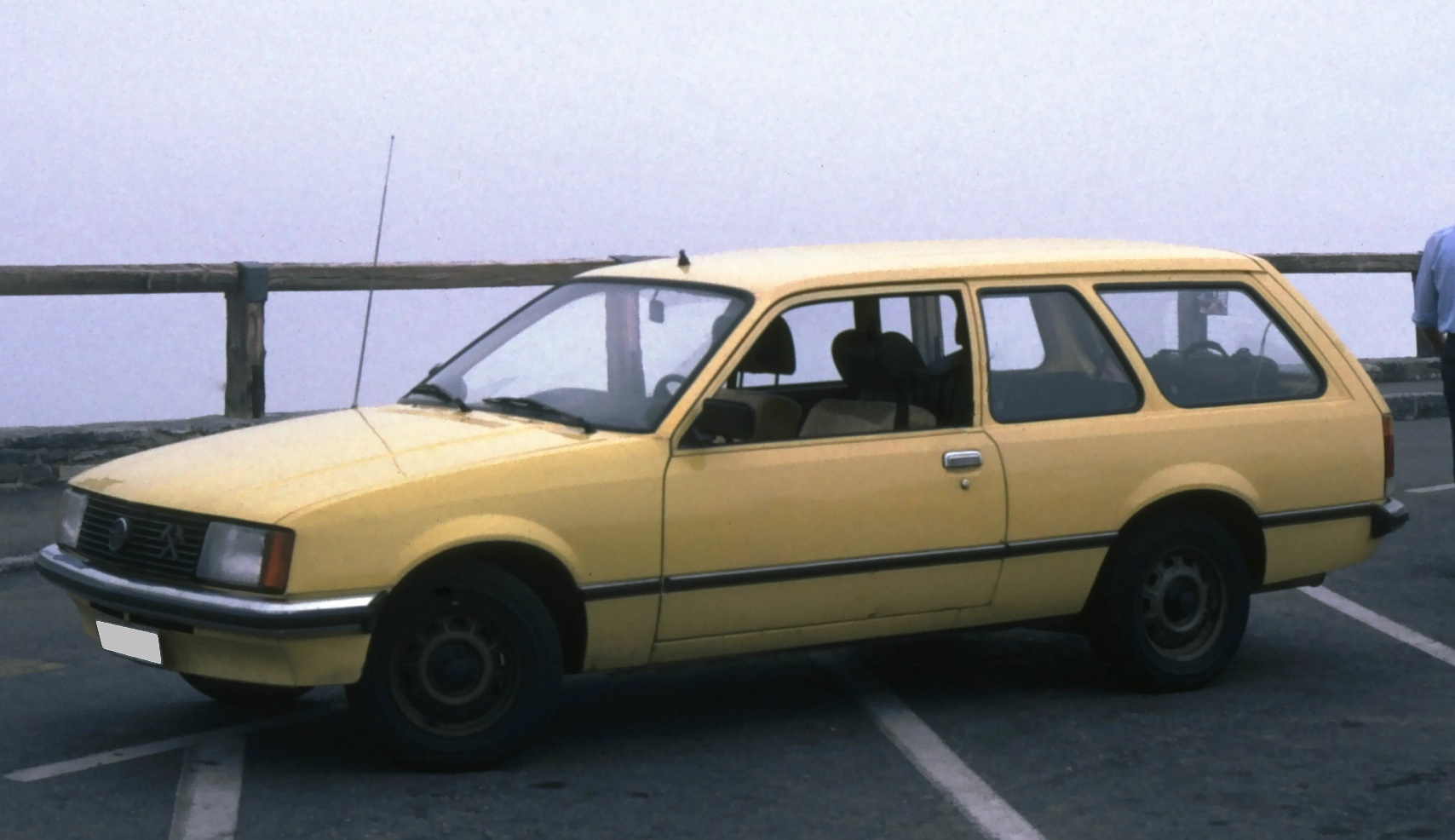
Two-door sedans and three-door estates still represented a significant proportion of Opel Rekord production

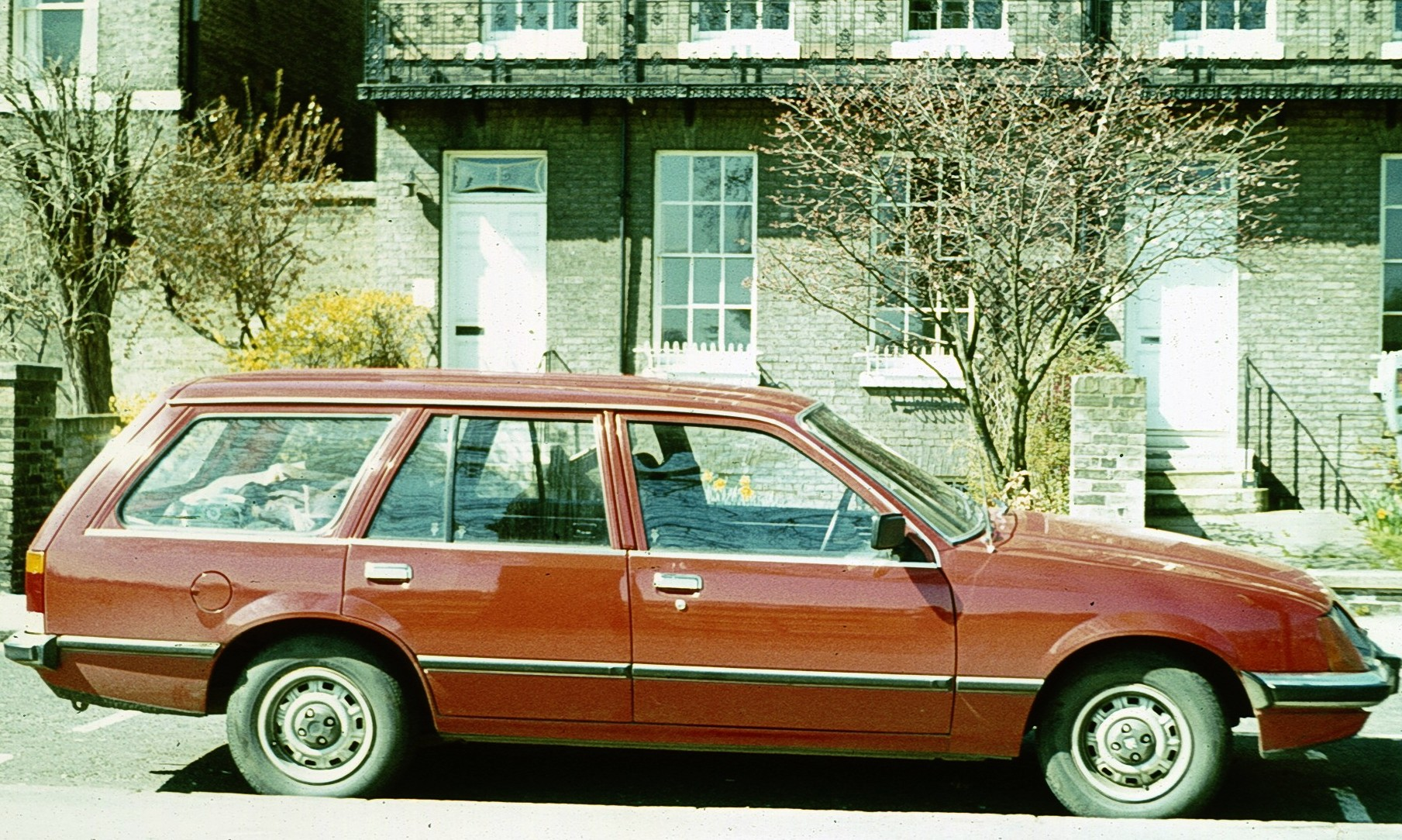
Most buyers of the estate nevertheless opted for a second set of doors, permitting direct access for the back seat passengers. This is the Vauxhall Carlton version of the estate.

The unibody, steel bodied cars offered seating for five. The top seller was the saloon. It was available with either two or four doors, although by now the West German market, which had for many years retained an appetite for larger cars with just two doors, was becoming more like the other major automarkets of western Europe in expecting cars the size of the Rekord to provide rear seat passengers with their own doors. The four-door Rekord comfortably outsold its two-door sibling. Saloon production was 769,086 cars, split between 127,544 2-door cars and 641,542 4-door cars. Opel Rekord E1 "Caravan" (estate) production was 167,501 cars, of which 26,652 were 3-door models and 140,849 were 5-door ones.

Opel also offered a three-door delivery van for light commercial use that was in most respects identical to the estate except that the rear side windows were replaced with metal panels. This configuration of vehicles offered self-employed small traders tax advantages in some countries. 30,477 Kasten-Lieferwagen (delivery van) Opel Rekord E1s were produced. This version was also assembled in Indonesia, with either petrol or a diesel 2-liter engines. Built from 1980 until 1988, it was possible to register this as a commercial vehicle although the majority of cars delivered would immediately have rear windows and seats installed.

For the first time since 1961 no Opel Rekord coupé was listed. However, customers wishing to enjoy style at the expense of rear seat headroom had not been abandoned to the competition, having been catered for since September 1970 by the company's stylish new Manta.

==== Petrol engines ====
Opel had introduced a new generation of petrol engines in 1966 with the Rekord B and these were the engines that reappeared in the Rekord E in 1977. As before, the stroke length was fixed at 69.8 mm: differences in engine size were achieved by varying the cylinder bore. The engine featured an unusual Camshaft in Head (CIH) configuration. The chain-driven camshaft was positioned directly above the cylinders but this was not a conventional ohc design. The camshaft operated the valves using rocker arms because the camshaft itself was positioned too low above the cylinders to permit direct action from the camshaft on the valves ends. One reason for this may have been cosmetic. Opel's so-called (CIH) engine configuration allowed the Rekord to incorporate the low bonnet lines that style-conscious product development departments called for.

The smallest power unit at launch was a 1698 cc engine with the low 8.0:1 compression ratio and 60 PS (44 kW) as on the predecessor. The engine had seen its power output reduced during its time in the previous model following the reduction in standard octanes on West German forecourts in response to reductions in permissible lead levels in motor fuel. This, combined with the increased weight, of the Rekord E to provide rather an underpowered package. The engine presumably cost much the same to produce as similarly configured larger engines and from the point of view of the costing department it no doubt made sense that customers specifying a car with this "1.7N" engine were, according to the manufacturer's price list, charged exactly the same as customer specifying the greater power (and barely enhanced fuel economy) available from the Rekord E when power by the low compression "1.9N" engine. Few Rekord E customers selected the 1.7 litre engine and it disappeared from the list in 1980.

The more popular entry level power unit during the early years of the Rekord E was the 1897 cc 19N engine, also with a low compression ratio and so content to use basic grade low octane petrol. Powered by this unit, the Rekord E's maximum claimed power output was 75 PS (55 kW), just as it had been when the same unit was fitted in the Rekord D. Austrian buyers received a slightly donwtuned version (A19N) producing 70 PS (51 kW) to fit the local tax and insurance climate.

Two years before production of the Rekord D came to an end, Opel had added to its engine palette a bored out 1979 cc version of their (CIH) engine, and this engine size reappeared in the Rekord E1 with three different power output levels, being 90 PS (66 kW), 100 PS (74 kW), and 110 PS (81 kW). The first of these, known as the "2.0N" came with a low 8:1 compression ratio and used basic grade fuel. The 100 PS unit, the "2.0S", had a 9:1 compression ratio and drivers using this engine were required to pay for "super" grade higher octane fuel. Available from the time of introduction, the new 81 kW "2.0E" engined Rekord also called for higher octane fuel and was the first Opel Rekord to feature fuel injection. This was rendered the more significant because during the 1980s legislators across western Europe would require automakers to fit catalytic converters to petrol fueled cars, and these would need to be used in conjunction with fuel injection because of a belief at the time that the imprecision of the fuel amounts injected with traditional carburetors created a risk of unburnt fuel emerging from the engine and burning or exploding in the converter, permanently and expensively damaging it. However, when the Rekord E was introduced in 1977 the challenges of catalytic converters, although already a familiar current challenge for General Motors in North America, were still a few years ahead for the European automakers. The Fuel injection system on the Rekord E came from Bosch who had already acquired extensive expertise of the relevant technologies working with Volkswagen. The system employed on the first fuel injected Rekords was the Bosch L Jetronic system, replaced towards the end of 1981 with the LE Jetronic. Rekord 1981 was also equipped with methanol resistant fuel system.

==== Diesel engines ====
The 2068 cc diesel engine with which in 1972 Opel had made their bid for a slice of the lucrative stranglehold that Mercedes-Benz enjoyed over the taxi market reappeared on launch in the Rekord E still offering 60 PS (44 kW) of maximum power. However, the new car was heavier than its predecessor and the market had also developed in the intervening half decade. Just a year later, in August 1978, the larger bored out 2260 cc version for which 65 PS (48 kW) was claimed was introduced. The smaller 2.1 was soon discontinued. As before, the diesel engine was taller than the petrol units designed for the Rekord and diesel powered Rekord Es were differentiated by a long hump shaped ridge along the centre of the bonnet, necessary to accommodate the engine block. Usually equipped with the larger 2.3 litre engine, the diesel Rekords were particularly popular in France, Italy, and the Benelux countries.

By now Ford were also looking for a share of the taxi market with a Peugeot-powered diesel version of their Granada model and Peugeot's own diesel powered 504 was itself becoming an increasingly serious competitor, especially in shared European export markets. The diesel powered Rekord E matched its competitors in many respects and — at least in terms of undiscounted published prices — was generally cheaper than the Mercedes models, but somehow Mercedes-Benz continued to dominate the taxi market in Germany and the surrounding western countries.

For markets — notably Italy but also Belgium — where car tax increased savagely for car with engine capacities above two litres, a reduced diesel engine of 1998 cc with a maximum power output of just 58 PS (43 kW) was available. This was the engine more usually specified for diesel powered versions of the smaller, lighter Opel Ascona. Top speed of a 2.0 D with the optional automatic transmission is a leisurely 132 km/h (82 mph). Rekords with this engine were assembled in Indonesia as well, with three-door panel van or estate bodywork.

==== Transmission ====
The standard transmission package was a manual all-synchromesh four speed gearbox, controlled using a centrally positioned floor mounted gear lever. There were plans to offer a new five-speed transmission, as in the Opels Senator and Monza, but when, in the summer of 1980, this was still not ready the manufacturer instead offered to buyers of the 1,979 cc petrol powered Rekords, for an extra DM 520, the option of a newly developed four-speed manual transmission incorporating an overdrive: this was intended to provide the chance to achieve improved fuel economy at a time when fuel efficiency was moving up the agenda of European car buyers coming to terms with the belief that the "era of cheap fuel" was over for good. Nevertheless, relatively few customers opted for the "four speeds with overdrive" transmission option.

Buyers could also specify a three-speed automatic transmission. The system used was the three-speed TH180 unit from the manufacturer's transmission plant in Strasbourg.

==== Suspension ====
At the front the suspension was redesigned, now incorporating MacPherson struts. The result was more compact, lighter, and probably cheaper to assemble than the uneven wishbone arrangements on the previous model, and the car's handling benefitted. Unfortunately Opel approached the Rekord's suspension upgrade "one end at a time", however. At the back the Rekord E retained from the previous model a beam axle tamed with four trailing connector arms, a Panhard rod like system and an anti-roll bar, in combination with coil springs and shock absorbers. Commentators felt that by now the rigid-rear axle based rear suspension fell short of mainstream west European standards in terms of the handling characteristics that it provided. However, customers wishing for more control over the back axle during fast bumpy rides could specify a "sports package" in the Opel Rekord E: the package included replacement of the standard oil-filled shock absorbers at the back of the car by gas-filled shocks. There will no doubt have been a trade-off in terms of a firmer ride in exchange for reduced wallow.

==== Brakes ====
The braking configuration was also essentially that from the previous Rekords, with a dual circuit hydraulically controlled system along with the brake servo as before, and incorporating, on larger engined versions, a brake force limiter for the rear brakes. The car used disc brakes at the front and drum brakes at the back.

There was a handbrake control light included in order to discourage drivers from setting off without fully releasing the handbrake.

=== Trim and equipment packages and special editions ===
Various different packages of trims and options were offered. These was a "base" Rekord, a luxury version branded as the "Rekord Luxus" and a "Rekord Berlina" which offered a still more opulent level of comfort and equipment. On the outside all cars other than the base version featured a rubber "protection strip" along the side of the car, and further differentiation was apparent from the differing levels of chrome trim and differently shaped steel wheels. On the inside trim qualities and fabrics varied according to version, and the "Berlina" featured a steering wheel with four thin spokes rather than two thick ones. Between 1977 and 1982 the precise details of which items were included in which trim package was periodically modified.

The extensive list of optional extras included a "Sports package" offered on all except the 1.7 litre cars, including various extra dials on the dash-board, halogen head-lights and gas filled shock absorbers for the rear wheels. Customers could also choose from a range of radios and speakers. One of the most eye catching options, featured for the first time on an Opel Rekord, was air conditioning, but for this feature the price was provided only "on application". The very small number of Rekord E1s delivered with air-conditioning suggests that the prices quoted were very high, and that air-conditioning was more a marker for Opel's future than a realistic option for Rekord customers in 1980.

The tactic continued of stimulating sales at quiet times of year by offering special editions — cars equipped with a package of options and advertised at a lower price than the buyer would face if simply equipping a Rekord with the same options from the standard price list. With the Rekord E1 the special editions included the "Rekord Regent", the "Rekord Royale", the "Rekord Classic", the "Rekord Touring" and the "Rekord SR/E".

UK Models

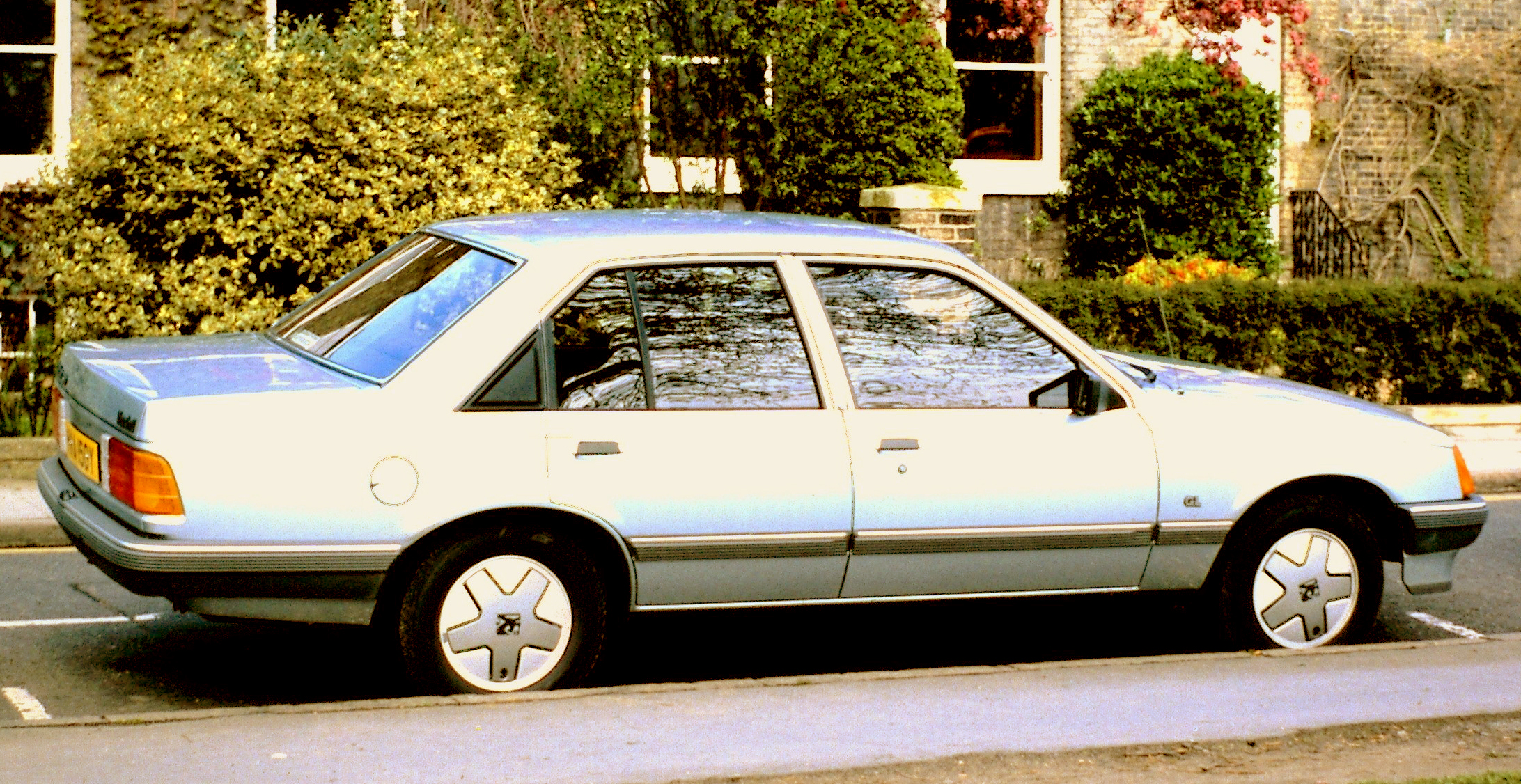
A rebadged Rekord E2 — the Vauxhall Carlton. Note the alloy wheel design which was adapted from the Opel Tech 1 concept car

Type	Saloon	Estate	Engine	Years Av.
Rekord	X	-	2.0	1978–80
Rekord DL	-	X	2.0	1978–80
Rekord Berlina, HL	X	-	2.0	1978–80
Rekord S	X	X	2.0	1980–82
Rekord Berlina S	X	-	2.0	1980–82
Rekord Berlina CD	X	-	2.0	1978–82
Rekord Diesel DL	X	X	2.3D	1978–80
Rekord Diesel	X	X	2.3D	1980–82

=== Commercial Success ===
Overall the Rekord E1 sold at approximately the same rate as its predecessor and in that respect experienced commercial success. Nevertheless, the automarket in West Germany and the surrounding countries had grown substantially in the 1960s and (if somewhat erratically) the 1970s. West Germany remained Europe's largest automarket, and here the latest Rekord did not dominate the market for family cars in the way Rekords had done fifteen years earlier. Data from long-standing rival, Ford Germany, showed the Ford Granada/Consul being produced at a far higher rate than the Rekord, with 1,619,265 cars produced between 1972–1977, although these figures did not take into account the large proportion of Granadas sold in the UK, another major European auto-market and one where the Granada inherited the market niche formerly occupied by the home grown Ford Zephyr.

Back in West Germany, Audi now enjoyed the commitment and financial backing of Volkswagen enabling them in due course to expand production at their Ingolstadt facility in response to demand of the Audi 100. Between 1976 and 1982 Audi produced 896,299 Audi 100 models, while between 1977 and 1982 Opel produced 962,218 Opel Rekord E1s. Half a class down Volkswagen's competent and modern Passat captured the mood of the market place, seducing potential Opel customers in a way the K70 had not. Half a class up from the Rekord BMW, close to bankruptcy in the early 1960s, now had the financial muscle to invest in growing production capacity for their 5 series at their own new plant in Dingolfing. The Opel Rekord retained a powerful position in the market place, but that position was increasingly constrained on several fronts. By the time the Rekord E1 was replaced, in 1982, by the extensively upgraded Opel Rekord E2, Opel Rekords were losing market share, and the Rekord E2 would be produced at a significantly lower rate than the Rekord E1.

=== Technical data ===
Opel Rekord E1 (1977–1982)
	1.7N	1.9N	2.0N	2.0S	2.0E	2.1D	2.3D
	1977–1980	1977–1982	1977–1982	1977–1982	1977–1982	1977–1978	1978–1982
Engine:	Straight-four Petrol engine					Straight-four Diesel engine	
Bore × Stroke:	88 mm × 69.8 mm (3.5 in × 2.7 in)	93 mm × 69.8 mm (3.7 in × 2.7 in)	95 mm × 69.8 mm (3.7 in × 2.7 in)			88 mm × 85 mm (3.5 in × 3.3 in)	92 mm × 85 mm (3.6 in × 3.3 in)
Displacement:	1,698 cc (103.6 cu in)	1,897 cc (115.8 cu in)	1,979 cc (120.8 cu in)			2,068 cc (126.2 cu in)	2,260 cc (137.9 cu in)
Maximum power:	60 PS (44 kW) at 4,800 rpm	75 PS (55 kW) at 4,800 rpm	90 PS (66 kW) at 5200 rpm	100 PS (74 kW) at 5,200 rpm	110 PS (81 kW) at 5,400 rpm	60 PS (44 kW) at 4,000 rpm	65 PS (48 kW) at 4,200 rpm
Maximum torque:	112 N⋅m (83 lb⋅ft) at 2,600 rpm	132 N⋅m (97 lb⋅ft) at 2,800 rpm	142 N⋅m (105 lb⋅ft) at 3,400 rpm	165 N⋅m (122 lb⋅ft) at 3,600 rpm	159 N⋅m (117 lb⋅ft) at 3,000 rpm	118 N⋅m (87 lb⋅ft) at 2,500 rpm	126 N⋅m (93 lb⋅ft) at 2,500 rpm
Compression ratio:	8.0:1	7.9:1	8.0:1	9.0:1	9.4:1	22.0:1	22.0:1
Fuel feed:	Single downdraft carburetor		Single twin-choke downdraft carburetor		Fuel injection: Bosch L-Jetronic until 1981, LE-Jetronic from 1981 on	Bosch diesel injection pump	
Valvetrain:	Chain-driven single camshaft in head (CIH), two overhead valves per cylinder, short pushrods and stamped-steel rocker arms					Chain-driven camshaft, two overhead valves per cylinder	
Cooling:	Water-cooled						
Transmission:	4-speed manual with floor-mounted shift						
.....Overdrive			Overdrive on top gear optional from 1980				
.....Automatic			GM "Strasbourg" TH180 3-speed automatic optional				
Front suspension:	MacPherson struts with coil springs and anti-roll bar						
Rear suspension:	Live axle with four trailing arms, "five-link" suspension arm and coil springs						
Brakes:	Servo-assisted hydraulically activated disc brakes at front, drum brakes at rear						
Body and chassis:	Steel unibody chassis with steel body and chrome bumpers						
Track front/rear:	1,435 / 1,412 mm (56.5 / 55.6 in)						
Wheelbase:	2,668 mm (105.0 in)						
Length:	4,620 mm (181.9 in)						
Unladen weight:	1,115–1,346 kg (2,458–2,967 lb)						
Top speed:	143 km/h (89 mph)	147–152 km/h (91–94 mph)	157–162 km/h (98–101 mph)	173–180 km/h (107–112 mph)	171–176 km/h (106–109 mph)	130–135 km/h (81–84 mph)	132–137 km/h (82–85 mph)
0–100 km/h (0–62 mph):	21.50 s	17.5–19.0 s	15.0–16.5 s	13.5–15.0 s	13.0–14.5 s	26.5–31.5 s	25.0–29.0 s
Fuel consumption:	12.0 l/100 km 23.5 mpg_{‑imp}; 19.6 mpg_{‑US} (Regular octane)	12.0–13.0 l/100 km 23.5–21.7 mpg_{‑imp}; 19.6–18.1 mpg_{‑US} (Regular octane)	12.0–13.5 l/100 km 23.5–20.9 mpg_{‑imp}; 19.6–17.4 mpg_{‑US} (Regular octane)	12.0–13.5 l/100 km 23.5–20.9 mpg_{‑imp}; 19.6–17.4 mpg_{‑US} (High octane)	12.0–13.5 l/100 km 23.5–20.9 mpg_{‑imp}; 19.6–17.4 mpg_{‑US} (High octane)	10.0–10.5 l/100 km 28.2–26.9 mpg_{‑imp}; 23.5–22.4 mpg_{‑US} (Diesel)	10.5–11.0 l/100 km 26.9–25.7 mpg_{‑imp}; 22.4–21.4 mpg_{‑US} (Diesel)

=== Holden Commodore ===
The Rekord E1 was the basis of the original 1978 Holden VB Commodore. However, to cope with Australian conditions it was strengthened substantially and used the Senator's nose (like the Opel Commodore) to accommodate the Holden straight-six and V8 engines.

=== Vauxhall Carlton ===
The first Vauxhall Carlton was an Opel Rekord E adapted for the United Kingdom market. At the front it featured a different bonnet echoing the "droop-snoot" front, as also used on the Chevette and Cavalier. The Carlton quietly succeeded the (by then long since discontinued) Vauxhall Victor FE, and was joined by the short lived Vauxhall Viceroy, a rebadged Commodore C. In the UK both models were outsold by the Ford Granada. At the back, between the rear light clusters, where the Rekord provided space for the license plate holder, the Carlton was provided with a black panel on which the word "Vauxhall" was spelled out in upper case letters. Carlton owners were expected to mount their rear license plates slightly lower than on the Rekord, screwed directly onto the bumper.

There was only a single trim package offered for the Carlton, corresponding approximately with the "Rekord Berlina", and only one engine could be ordered with the Carlton, being the 1,979 cc 74 kW (100 PS) "2.0S" unit.

The Carlton and the Rekord were assembled on the same production line at the manufacturer's Rüsselsheim plant, and until 1982 right hand drive versions of both cars competed together in the UK market. Buyers attracted by the Carlton but looking for a trim and engine combination not featured on the Vauxhall could accordingly choose a car from the Opel Rekord range. From 1982, the facelifted E2 Vauxhall Carltons were distinguishable from Opel Rekords only by their badging, with no sheet metal differences.

=== Chevrolet Rekord ===
The Rekord E1 was sold in South Africa where initially it was branded as the Chevrolet Rekord, with either the four-door sedan or the five-door estate bodywork. It was first announced in early July 1978, in standard or GL versions. It was powered by a locally produced small-bore version of Chevrolet's "153" four-cylinder engine, of 2,319 cc and 90 PS (66 kW) at 4,800 rpm. The Rekord was soon followed by the more luxurious Chevrolet Commodore, with which it shared most of its bodywork.

Import duties in South Africa were prohibitively high, but anticipated volumes did not justify a car plant. The cars were therefore delivered as kits and then assembled at Port Elizabeth. Local modifications, aside from the engine, included particular attention to dust protection. After the fall of 1980 the Chevrolet Rekord was also available with the 1,979 cc four as used in Europe, with 100 PS (74 kW).

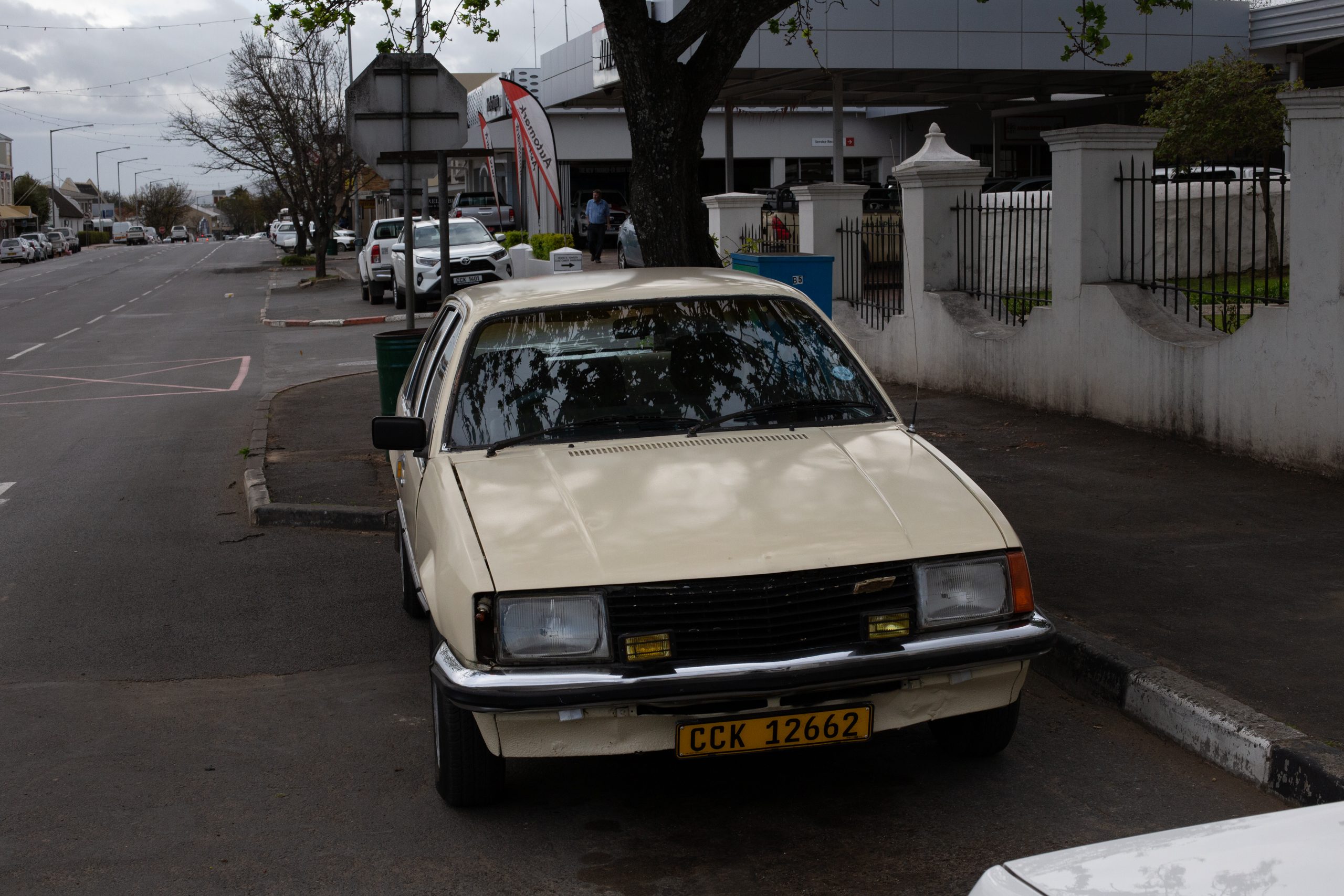
Chevrolet Rekord (front)

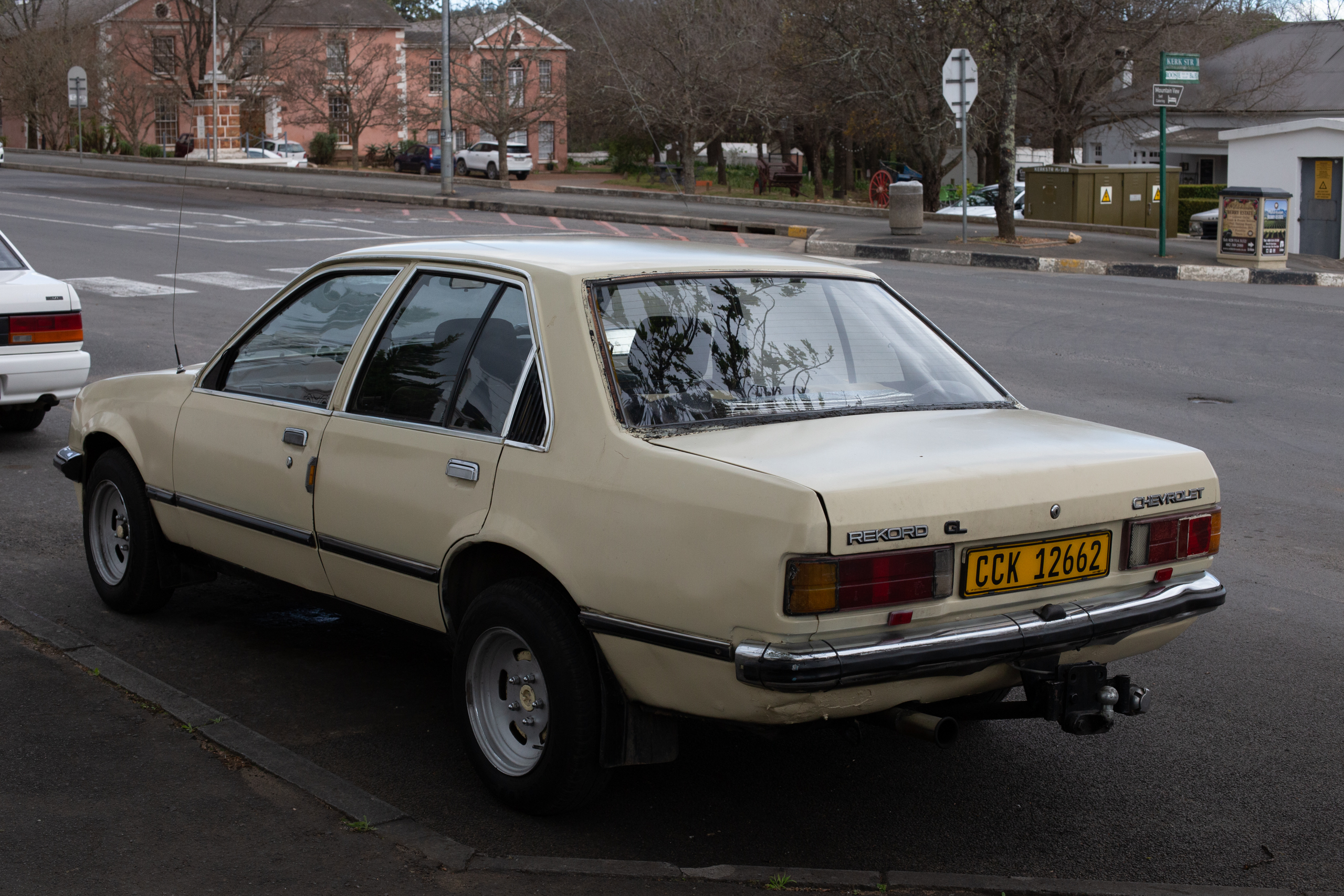
Chevrolet Rekord (rear)

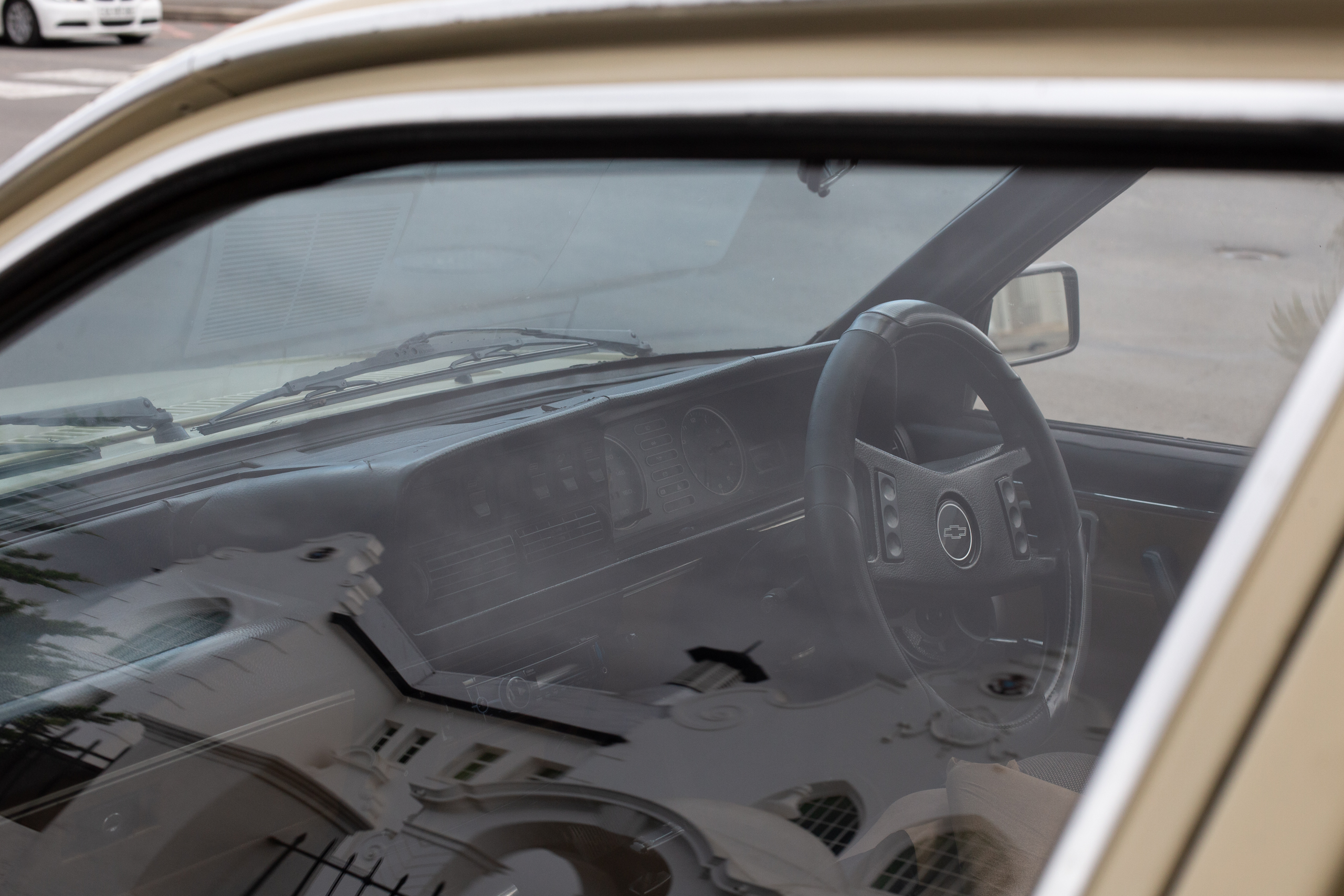
Chevrolet Rekord (interior)

=== Saehan Rekord ===
The Saehan Rekord and Saehan Royale were Korean built versions of the Opel Rekord E1. The General Motors company which assembled them later became known as Daewoo and the car became known as the Daewoo Royale and continued to be based on the Rekord E1 till 1985, by which time Rüsselsheim had been producing the upgraded Rekord E2 for more than two years.

The Korean cars came with a choice of 3 Camshaft in Head (CIH) engines, all of them delivered from Germany by Opel. The petrol engine sizes were 1,492 cc, 1,897 cc, and 1,979 cc, and the maximum power outputs were respectively 60, 85 and 102 PS. All three engines were broadly similar and they shared the same 69.8 mm piston stroke, with the variation in overall displacement achieved by varying the cylinder bore, although the smallest of them had not been fitted to a German assembled Opel Rekord since being phased out in 1970 during the time of the Opel Rekord C. From May 1980 the Korean car was also available with a 1,998 cc diesel unit. This was the same unit as used in Europe to power diesel Rekords in markets such as Italy with taxation regimes that punished cars with engines of above two litres capacity. Claimed top speed with this diesel unit was just 130 km/h (81 mph).

Despite using European engines, the Korean petrol fueled cars rejected the German cars' Solex carburetors, using Nikki-Stromberg ones instead. Body panel pressings came not from Europe but from Holden in Australia who were producing their own Rekord derived model, although the Australian car was closer to the slightly longer Opel Senator, itself a lengthened version of the Rekord E.

== Opel Rekord E2 (1982–1986) ==
Opel Rekord Series E2
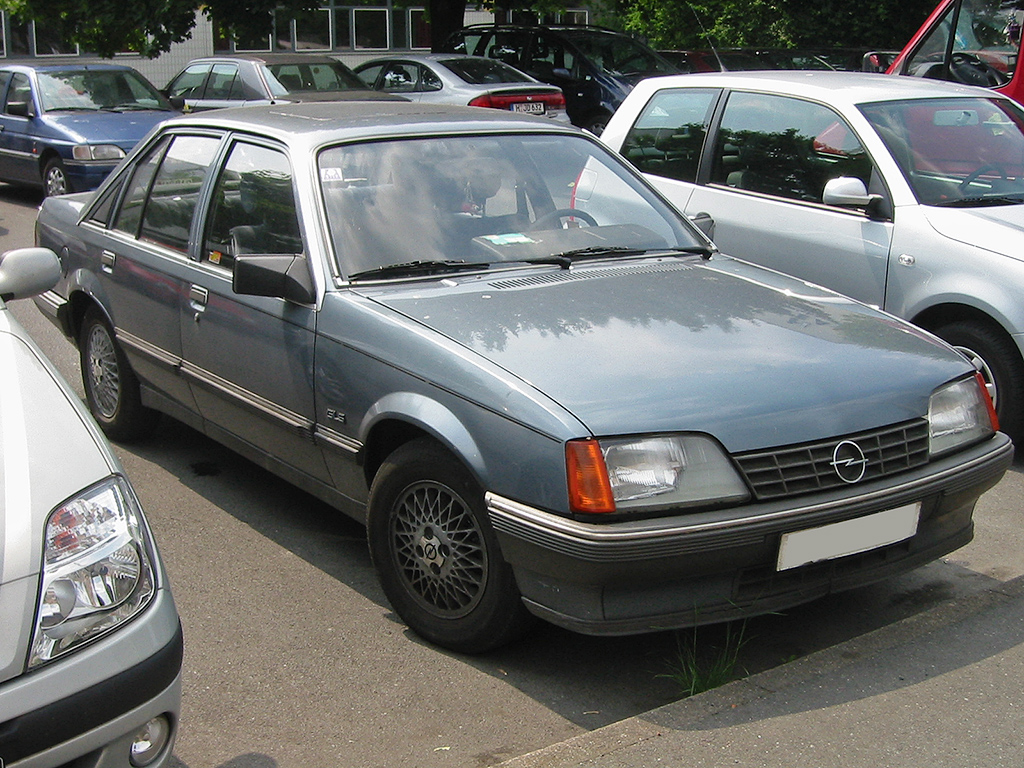
- Opel Rekord 2.2i GLS

Overview
- Manufacturer: Opel
- Production: 1982–1986

Body and chassis
- Body style: 4-door saloon; 3-door estate/panel van; 5-door estate

Powertrain
- Engine: petrol: 1796 cc 18N/18S/C18NV I4; 1979 cc 20S/20E I4; 2197 cc 22E I4; diesel: 2260 cc 23D I4; 2260 cc 23DT turbo I4
- Transmission: 4-speed Muncie M20 manual (with optional OD); 5-speed Getrag 240 manual; 3-speed GM Opel Automatic (THM180) automatic

Dimensions
- Wheelbase: 2,670 mm (105.1 in)
- Length: 4,620 mm (181.9 in)

In September 1982, the Rekord E received a major upgrade. The upgrade might have been held out as marking a new Opel Rekord, but it was not: the manufacturer continued to use the "Rekord E" designation. Subsequently, Rekords assembled in Rüsselsheim between 1977 and 1982 have become known as Rekord E1s, and those assembled in that plant between 1982 and 1986 have become known as Rekord E2s. However, in other continents where the Rekord was assembled, the Rekord E2 replaced the Rekord E1 later than in Europe. The E2 also marked the end of Carlton production at Vauxhall's Luton plant — with the Vauxhall brand dropped in all GM Europe markets outside the UK, all Vauxhall Carlton-badged Rekord E2s were now also assembled at Rüsselsheim. This would continue for the next two generations of Opel Omega which followed.

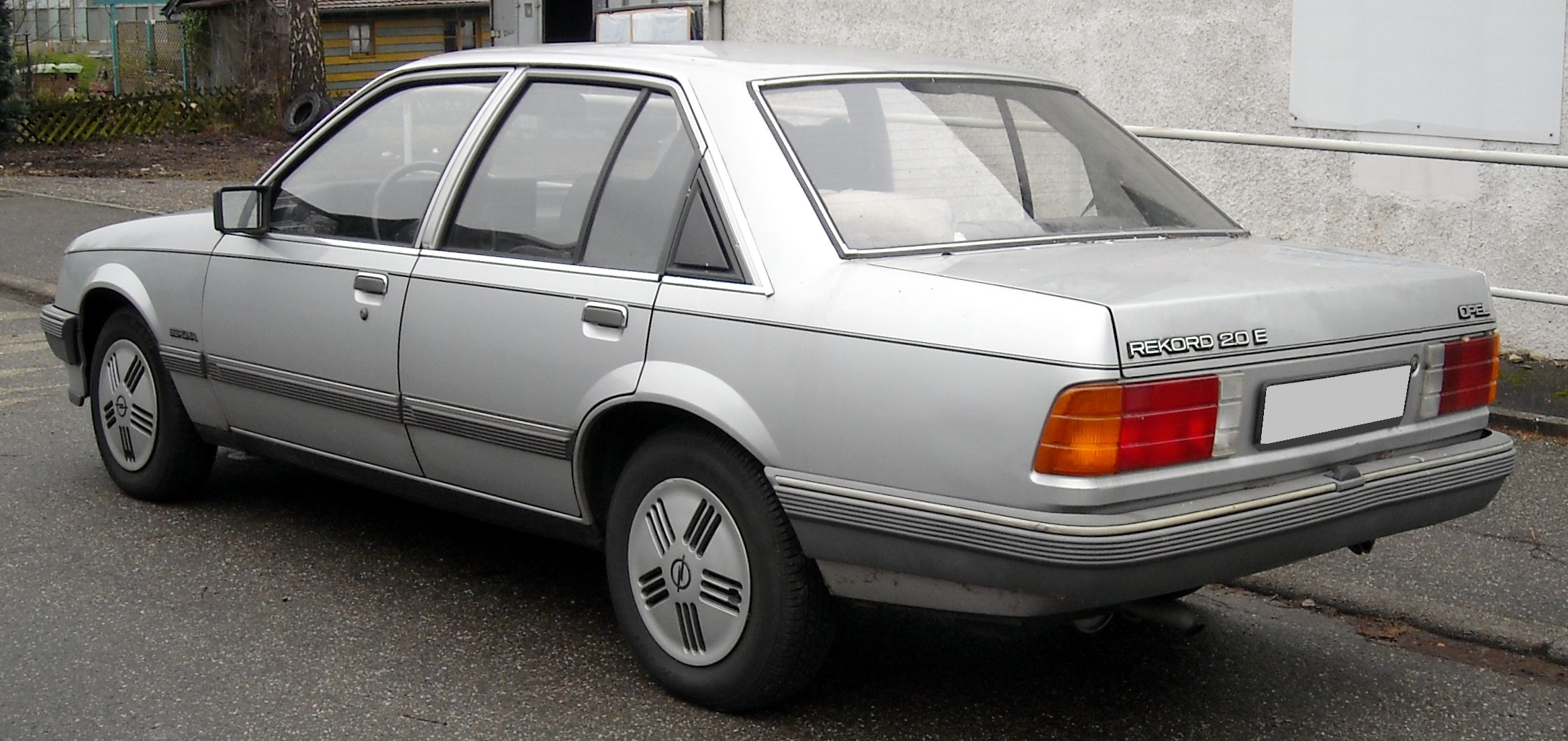
The rear was also redesigned, with a taller profile than the E1

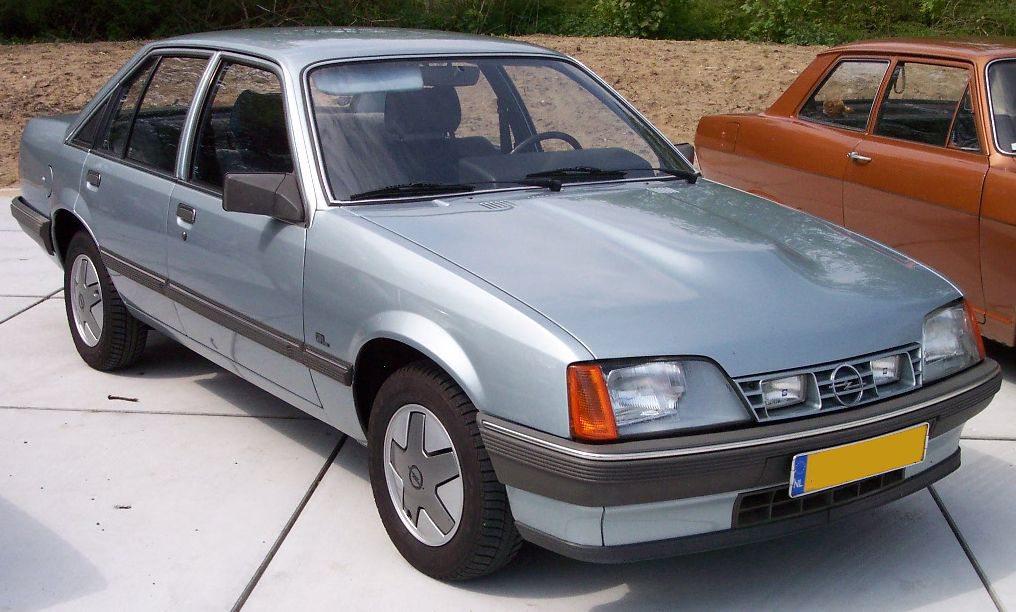
Ever since the introduction of the first diesel powered Opel Rekord in 1972, the diesel engine had been too tall for the standard car's engine compartment, giving rise to a hump shaped ridge along the centre of the bonnet. Diesel powered Rekord Es continued the tradition.

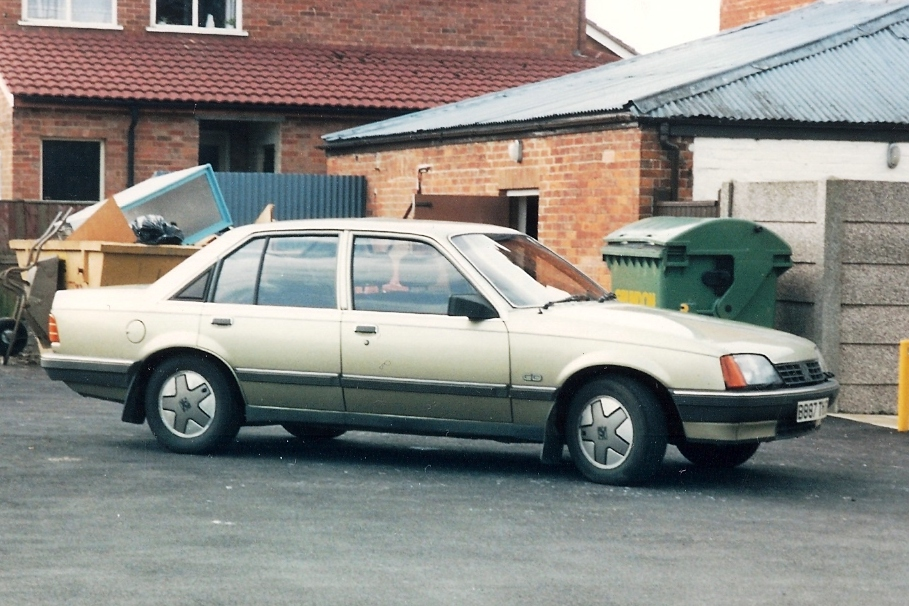
After 1982 it became impossible to distinguish between a Vauxhall Carlton and an Opel Rekord without getting close enough to see the badges on the wheels. This is a Vauxhall Carlton.

The new car shared the basic chassis components from the E1. The shape of the central portion of the car was unchanged. But there were several new engines, and the front hood was reshaped to give a smoother profile. At the back was a 20 mm (0.8 in) higher boot/trunk than before which improved aerodynamics and also marginally increased luggage capacity from 480 to 490 L (17.0 to 17.3 cu ft). The apparently minor changes in the shapes of the ends of the car, together with tighter tolerances applied to major pressings which permitted a reduction in the panel gaps on the car body, enabled the manufacturer to boast of an improved aerodynamic profile which marginally improved performance and reduced fuel consumption. The published drag coefficient was reduced from 0.42 C_{d} on the Rekord E1 to 0.36 C_{d} on the Rekord E2. The Opel Rekord D had been seen by many enthusiasts as a good looking car: the styling of the E1 had met with a more mixed reception. Opel now used the extra length at the car's ends to produce a Rekord E2 with more conventionally mainstream proportions than those of the short-nosed E1.

The Rekord E was initially available in three equipment levels: standard, De Luxe, and Berlina. In March 1983 the luxurious CD model appeared, plugging the small gap left by the disappearance of the Commodore. For the light 1985 model year facelift (introduced in July 1984) the names of the equipments changed: the standard became the LS, the De Luxe became the GL, and the Berlina was now the GLS. The CD remained.

=== Design ===
==== Bodywork ====
The unibody, steel bodied cars offered seating for five. Ten years earlier the Opel Rekord had come with a wide choice of body types, but the coupé had already gone with the introduction of the Rekord E. With the 1982 introduction of the E2, the manufacturer also withdrew the two-door saloon. This left just a choice between a four-door saloon and a three- or five-door estate. A delivery van version of the Rekord E2 remained in production, but only 8,958 of these were produced between 1982 and 1986 as against 30,477 Rekord E1 based vans produced between 1977 and 1982.

Despite the wheelbase being unchanged, the overhangs had increased, and the Rekord E2, yet again, was a little longer than the car it replaced. In fact it was exactly the same length as the recently upgraded but rather more prestigious BMW 5-series.

==== Interior ====
Changes to the interior of the car over the original Rekord E1 were relatively small — with the superstructure of the dashboard remaining the same, but with a restyled and rearranged upper binnacle that incorporated an instrument cluster with much larger dials than before — which would also feature on the Senator A2 and Monza A2. Steering wheels were redesigned with either a two spoke on lower trim models (uniquely having the marque name "OPEL" or "VAUXHALL" spelled out (depending on whether the car was badged as a Rekord or Carlton), or a four spoke on higher series cars. There were also some general upgrades to trim materials and equipment.

==== Petrol engines ====
With the arrival of the E2, the low compression "1.7N", "1.9N" and "2.0N" engines disappeared from the Rekord, to be replaced by the GM Family II engine that made its debut in 1981 in the Ascona C and Kadett D models. Featuring a light metal cylinder head and a conventional overhead camshaft this unit presumably had fewer moving parts in the valvegear than the more singular Camshaft in Head (CIH) unit that had powered Opel Rekords since 1965. For the Rekord E2 a 1796 cc version of the Family II engine was fitted. This 1.8 litre engine, in its 66 kW (90 PS) version had in fact already become available a few months earlier in the Opel Manta. In this format, the "1.8S" engine employed a single twin chamber carburetor and, with a compression ratio of 9.2:1, required higher octane "super" grade fuel. For economy minded customers an entry level version of the 1796 cc engine was offered with a more basic carburetor and compression ratio of 8.2:1. In this configuration the "1.8N" engine provided a claimed maximum power output of 55 kW (75 PS), slightly less performance and slightly better fuel economy. However, at least in the manufacturer's own advertised prices, the "1.8S" and "1.8N" engined cars were sold at the same price.

As a subsidiary of a corporation headquartered in the US, Opel had more reason than most European automakers to access and understand the increasingly stringent anti-pollution regulations which had effectively enforced the fitting of catalytic converters to cars sold in the US, and now the trend was spreading across the Atlantic. By the time the Rekord E2 appeared in 1982 West Germany had already passed the law that would effectively enforce the use of catalytic converters for cars sold there, though at this stage the industry was still being given time, in West Germany, to prepare for the new laws to come into force: Switzerland and Sweden had already introduced much more stringent standards than other European nations, and catalytic converters began making inroads in the mid-80s. It was still believed that carburettor fed engines were liable to pass unburnt fuel into the exhaust chamber, with potentially damaging results for the converter, so the manufacturer chose to combine the new anti-pollution device with a potentially more precise fuel injection system. Beginning in August of 1985 the Rekord became available in its West German home market with a third version of the 1796 cc engine, designated the "1.8 i Kat". As the designation indicated, this engine came with fuel injection and a catalytic converter. A maximum 74 kW (100 PS) of power was claimed, and the performance was accordingly enhanced, but the Opel Rekord 1.8 with this engine required "super" grade fuel which it consumed with indelicate relish. Nevertheless, it was one of the first cars to be offered in West Germany with this level of pollution control.

In contrast to the smaller engined cars, for larger engined petrol powered Rekord E2s the 1979 cc Camshaft in Head (CIH) engine was carried forward from the previous model. The "2.0S" version delivered 74 kW (100 PS) as before, though now with a higher compression ratio, the Varajet 2 carburettor and the requirement for "super" grade higher octane fuel. The "2.0E" version continued, at launch, as the only Rekord to incorporate fuel injection and in this form it provided maximum power output of 81 kW (110 PS). In 1984 a larger 2197 cc version of the fuel injected four cylinder "2.2E" engine was introduced, differing from the "2.0" only because the piston stroke was now extended from 69.8 mm to 77.5 mm. The new car was noted at the time for its unusually strong torque, even at low engine speeds. In West Germany the "2.2E" powered Rekord E replaced the "2.0E" car, but in export markets where the two litre threshold was more significant in terms of punitive car tax rates the "2.0E" engined car continued to be listed. The Rekord's largest export market to retain the "2.0E" engine for tax reasons was, as previously, Italy, but the "2.0E" continued to be sold in place of the "2.2E" in Switzerland and Sweden because the larger engined car was initially unable to meet the new anti-pollution requirements in those countries.

==== Diesel engines ====
The Rekord E2's 2,260 cc diesel unit was carried over unchanged from the E1, still with maximum power output of 65 PS (48 kW). However, a year later, in Autumn 1983, power was increased to 71 PS (52 kW) along with a small increase in torque. At the Geneva Motor Show in March 1984, a turbocharged version of the venerable 2.3 litre diesel was introduced, going on sale a few months later. This was Opel's first turbocharged engine. Power was increased to 86 PS (63 kW), meaning that the car performed as well as some petrol versions at the time. Other mechanic differences were slim, limited to better cooling measures (including an oil cooler) and other detail measures. The turbodiesel, only available with a five-speed manual, was also offered in the luxurious "CD" trim. This engine had already been offered in a diesel powered version of the longer Opel Senator since 1983.

==== Transmission & Suspension ====
The standard transmission package was the manual all-synchromesh four-speed gearbox, controlled using a floor mounted gear change. There was also the option of a Getrag-manufactured five-speed transmission. This became available in 1982, a couple of years later than had been planned. Buyers of all but the smallest engined cars could also still specify a three-speed automatic transmission option. The five-speed had longer gearing than the fourth speed on the first three gears, while fourth remained mostly the same and fifth was an overdrive. This was then compensated for by a longer final drive for the five-speed, although the 1.8 S, which has a lot of low-end torque while being somewhat unwilling to rev, received the same final drive as the four-speed, for an even greater gas mileage improvement.

At the rear, a live axle retained by a panhard rod was employed with an open differential. Differential bushings were added after E2 production had started. Up front, the MacPherson strut layout from the E1 was modified to be more supple. The front stabilizer bar no longer acted as the torque arm; instead, it was attached to the lower A-arm of the front suspension. Stability was also improved by this redesign, while the center of gravity was lowered by about 1 mm (0.039 in). The springs were changed to variable rate units, allowing for a softer ride with less body roll when driven hard. Steering was by a steering box and drag links. The brakes received somewhat larger pistons for the front discs (drums at the rear), otherwise they remained unchanged.

=== Commercial ===
Approximately 1.4 million Rekord Es were produced, which made it the third Rekord in succession to sell above a million cars. However, 962,218 were Rekord E1s produced between 1977 and 1982, meaning that after 1982 the Rekord E2 was selling at less than 60% of the annualised rate of the E1. In part it was a victim of the success of the company's own Ascona which pushed the Rekord upmarket, but as it moved upmarket it moved ever closer to the prestige models being sold in ever higher volumes. Although the advertised prices — at least to private buyers — for cars such as the Mercedes-Benz W123, the 5 series BMW and the Audi 100 — were considerably higher than those for the Rekord, the gap was smaller than it had been and, increasingly, customers paying for a car this size were willing to pay for the prestige brands. The higher purchase prices of the upscale brands were also mitigated by a higher value retention. Opel were not alone in having their largest family cars squeezed out by the prestige brands, and the Peugeot 604, Renault 20/30 and Ford Granada along with their increasingly marginalised successors all fell victim to the same phenomenon during the closing decades of the twentieth century, while mainstream volume automakers outside Europe sought to address the same issues by launching, with varying degrees of success, new premium brands such as Lexus, Infiniti and Eunos.

For the time being Opel persisted with the large family car segment, and at the end of the summer in 1986 the Rekord was replaced on the Rüsselsheim production lines by the more aerodynamic yet Opel Omega.

=== Technical data ===
Opel Rekord E2 (1982–1986)
	1.8N	1.8S	1.8i Kat	2.0S	2.0E	2.2i	2.3D	2.3TD
	1982–1986	1982–1986	1985–1986	1982–1986	1982–1984	1984–1986	1982–1986	1984– 1986
Motor:	Straight-four Petrol engine						Straight-four Diesel engine (2.3D) / Turbo Diesel engine (2.3TD)	
Bore × Stroke:	84.8 mm × 79.5 mm (3.3 in × 3.1 in)			95 mm × 69.8 mm (3.7 in × 2.7 in)		95 mm × 77.5 mm (3.7 in × 3.1 in)	92 mm × 85 mm (3.6 in × 3.3 in)	
Displacement:	1,796 cc (109.6 cu in)			1,979 cc (120.8 cu in)		2,197 cc (134.1 cu in)	2,260 cc (137.9 cu in)	
Maximum power:	75 PS (55 kW) at 5400 rpm	90 PS (66 kW) at 5400 rpm	100 PS (74 kW) at 5600 rpm	100 PS (74 kW) at 5200 rpm	110 PS (81 kW) at 5400 rpm	115 PS (85 kW) at 4000 rpm	65 or 71 PS (48 or 52 kW) at 4200 or 4400 rpm Power increased in 1983	86 PS (63 kW) at 4200 rpm
Maximum torque:	132 N⋅m (97 lb⋅ft) at 3000 rpm	140 N⋅m (103 lb⋅ft) at 3200 rpm	137 N⋅m (101 lb⋅ft) at 3000 rpm	156 N⋅m (115 lb⋅ft) at 3800 rpm	162 N⋅m (119 lb⋅ft) at 3000 rpm	188 N⋅m (139 lb⋅ft) at 2800 rpm	126 or 132 N⋅m (93 or 97 lb⋅ft) at 2400 or 2500 rpm	185 N⋅m (136 lb⋅ft) at 2200 rpm
Compression ratio:	8.2:1	9.2:1	8.9:1	9.0:1	9.4:1		22.0:1	23.0:1
Fuel feed:	Single downdraft carburetor	Single twin-choke downdraft carburetor	Bosch LE-Jetronic fuel injection	Single twin chamber downdraft carburetor	Bosch LE-Jetronic fuel injection		Bosch diesel injection pump	
Cooling:	Water-cooled							
Transmission:	4- or 5-speed manual with floor-mounted shift (Automatic optional except on 1.8N)							5-speed manual
.....Automatic	—	3-speed automatic optional						—
Front suspension:	MacPherson struts with coil springs and anti-roll bar							
Rear suspension:	Rigid axle with four trailing arms, "five-link" suspension arm and coil springs							
Brakes:	Servo-assisted hydraulically activated: Ø 244 mm disc brakes in front, drum brakes at rear							
Body and chassis:	Steel unibody chassis with steel body							
Track front/rear:	1,435 / 1,412 mm (56.5 / 55.6 in) (Caravan rear track: 1,432 mm (56.4 in))							
Wheelbase:	2,668 mm (105.0 in)							
Length:	4,652 / 4,678 mm (183.1 / 184.2 in) (Sedan and Caravan)							
Unladen weight:	1,140–1,305 kg (2,513–2,877 lb)							
Top speed:	154 km/h (95.7 mph)	160–165 km/h (99.4–102.5 mph)	167–172 km/h (103.8–106.9 mph)	169–175 km/h (105.0–108.7 mph)	175–181 km/h (108.7–112.5 mph)	180–187 km/h (111.8–116.2 mph)	145–153 km/h (90.1–95.1 mph)	165 km/h (102.5 mph)
0–100 km/h (0–62 mph):	17.5 s	15–16.5 s	14–15.5 s	13.5–15 s	13–14.5 s	12–13 s	22–28 s	16 s
Fuel consumption:	12.5 l/100 km 22.6 mpg_{‑imp}; 18.8 mpg_{‑US} (Regular octane)	12.5–13.5 l/100 km 22.6–20.9 mpg_{‑imp}; 18.8–17.4 mpg_{‑US} (High octane)	13.0–14.5 l/100 km 21.7–19.5 mpg_{‑imp}; 18.1–16.2 mpg_{‑US} (High octane)	12.5–13.5 l/100 km 22.6–20.9 mpg_{‑imp}; 18.8–17.4 mpg_{‑US} (High octane)	12.5–13.5 l/100 km 22.6–20.9 mpg_{‑imp}; 18.8–17.4 mpg_{‑US} (High octane)	12.5–13.5 l/100 km 22.6–20.9 mpg_{‑imp}; 18.8–17.4 mpg_{‑US} (High octane)	10.5–11.0 l/100 km 26.9–25.7 mpg_{‑imp}; 22.4–21.4 mpg_{‑US} (Diesel)	10.0 l/100 km 28.2 mpg_{‑imp}; 23.5 mpg_{‑US} (Diesel )

=== Vauxhall Carlton ===
When the Rekord E2 replaced the Rekord E1, the Vauxhall Carlton version also received a facelift. In this case, the car lost its distinctive hood/bonnet at the front and became, in most respects, indistinguishable from the Rekord. Whereas the first generation of Carlton had been offered with a single engine and a single trim package, the 1982 Carlton was available with several of the engines from the Rekord's palette, as well as several of the Rekord's trim options. General Motors in Europe now followed the logic arising from the end of separately designed Vauxhalls, and after 1982 there were no more Opel Rekord badged cars exported to the UK. Right hand drive Rekords continued to be produced at Rüsselsheim for certain right hand drive markets — notably Ireland — where the Opel name plate was thought to enjoy wider customer acceptance than the Vauxhall one.

=== Opel Rekord in South Africa ===
In South Africa the Opel Rekord switched from the E1 to the E2 version only in 1984, General Motors's South African subsidiary having changed from the Chevrolet brand name two years earlier. The old pushrod 2.3 was retired, with the facelifted versions receiving the 1,979 cc four as used in Europe, with 100 PS (74 kW) (110 PS or 81 kW for the fuel-injected version). It continued to be assembled in South Africa until the early 1990s, long after the German model itself had been replaced. The 2.0 engine was joined in 1984 by the "2.2E" engines.

From mid-1991 the cars became available with a 3.8 litre V6 engine with 130 kW (177 PS) originating with General Motors' Holden subsidiary in South Australia. This largely replaced the earlier Commodore, which, unlike its German counterparts had continued to be available after the mid-life facelift. The Commodore was only available with the fuel injected 30E engine. The 3.8 liter Rekord 380i GSi had an advertised top speed of 211 km/h (131 mph), making it substantially faster than any listed Opel Rekord from the factory in Germany, while the automatic-only CD model could reach 220 km/h (140 mph). On the other hand, the CD reached 100 km/h (62 mph) faster, as a result of being able to reach the ton in second gear. In addition to a full equipment (slightly less ample for the sportier GSi), the Rekord 380i also received the Omega's independent rear suspension and power assisted rack-and-pinion steering to help handle the extra power. The interior was upgraded with a new dash and a sporty steering wheels and seats, while the exterior received ten-spoke alloy wheels and a rear spoiler.

Until 1986 the Opel Rekord was assembled by General Motors South Africa in Port Elizabeth, but as a result of an international sanctions regime General Motors were not permitted to invest further after 1986. The business was transferred through a management buy-out to a new company called the Delta Motor Corporation, and it was under this arrangement that Rekord E2s were assembled in South Africa until the 1990s, using kits shipped from Rüsselsheim. In another minor facelift, the later South African Rekords featured the Opel badge mounted above rather than within the grille, similar to the smaller Kadetts of the era.

=== Saehan / Daewoo Royale ===
At the middle of 1982 the Rekord E2 became the basis for the Korean assembled Saehan Royale, which until then had continued to be based on the Rekord E1. The engines remained, as before, the Rekord's 1492 cc, 1897 cc and 1979 cc units.

Until 1983 the Korean cars had been branded as Saehan Rekords and Saehan Royales, but after that date the Rekord name was dropped and they were all branded as Royales. Some time later, reflecting a change in the corporate structure, the "Saehan" name was replaced by "Daewoo". Around this time the rear end design was changed for one similar to that of an early Senator. Later in the 1980s body panels shipped in from Holden's South Australian factory were replaced by local stampings, and in 1987 the front and rear panels of the car were reshaped and modernized. In other respects the car remained true to its Opel Rekord origins and it continued in Korean production until 1993.

== See also ==
- Opel Rekord
- Opel Commodore
- Daewoo Royale
