= Saehan Motors =

Defunct South Korean automobile manufacturer

Saehan Motor Company
- Company type: Joint venture
- Industry: Automotive
- Predecessor: General Motors Korea (1972–1976) (Note: It was a joint venture established by local Shinjin Motors and General Motors, not related to the GM Korea established in 2002 after the Daewoo's bankruptcy.)
- Founded: 1976
- Founder: General Motors; Government of South Korea
- Defunct: 1982; 44 years ago
- Fate: Acquired by Daewoo Group in 1978
- Successor: Daewoo Motors
- Headquarters: Bupyeong, South Korea
- Products: Entry Level vehicles
- Parent: Korea Development Bank (1976–1978); Daewoo Group (1978–1982)

- Saehan Motors
- Hangul: 새한 자동차
- Hanja: 새한 自動車
- RR: Saehan jadongcha
- MR: Saehan chadongch'a

The Saehan Motor Company was a South Korean automobile manufacturer founded in 1976, which was born on the collaboration of Shinjin Industrial Company and General Motors to introduce their products on the South Korean market. Saehan was born on the former "General Motors Korea", which encountered difficulties when the South Korean market collapsed, following the first round of oil rises in 1973. This joint-venture, 50-50 between GM and Shinjin, consisted on a car assembly plant in Bupyong, a truck assembly plant in Pusan and a foundry at Incheon. In November 1976, Shinjin Motors faced financial problems and sold its 50% stake in Saehan to the Korea Development Bank (KDB). In 1978, the Daewoo Group acquired the equity stake and management rights from KDB. The company was renamed Daewoo Motor Co. in January 1983.

== History ==
The company origins can be traced back to National Motors, a company established in 1937 in Bupyeong-gu, Incheon, South Korea. Its name was changed to "Saenara Motor" in November 1962. Saenara was assembling and selling Datsun Bluebird P310s. Very first automobile company in Korea, Saenara was equipped with modern assembly facilities, and was established after the Automobile Industry Promotion Policy was announced by the South Korean government in 1962. Saenara Motor was then bought by Shinjin Industrial in 1965, which changed its name to Shinjin Motor after establishing collaborations with Toyota. Shinjin's range included various Toyota models, such as the Publica, T40 Corona and Crown.

After Toyota's withdrawal from its Korea investment in 1972, Shinjin Motors started a joint venture with American General Motors under the name "General Motors Korea" (GMK). Nevertheless, soon after the alliance, GM showed disconformity with Shinjin's management and in 1976 GM asked the Korean Government (through the US Embassy in Seoul) to find another partner. As the Shinjin Group was experiencing financial problems its shares in GMK were sold to the Korea Development Bank. As a result, the company's name was changed to Saehan Motor Company Ltd". GMK shortly sold their Rekord model under the GMK marque, together with the Holden Torana based Chevrolet 1700. When GMK was renamed to Saehan, the 1700 became Saehan Camina.

Saehan's range was composed of diverse GM models: the Saehan Gemini was based on 1974 Isuzu's Bellett Gemini, then replaced by the Maepsy (known as Saehan Bird for export), which was a development of the Gemini. It had a pickup derivate, the Saehan Max. Saehan also marketed the Opel Rekord E and created later, on this basis, their Royale Series, composed of the Royale Diesel, Royale Automatic and Royale Salon models.

== Models ==
=== Cars ===
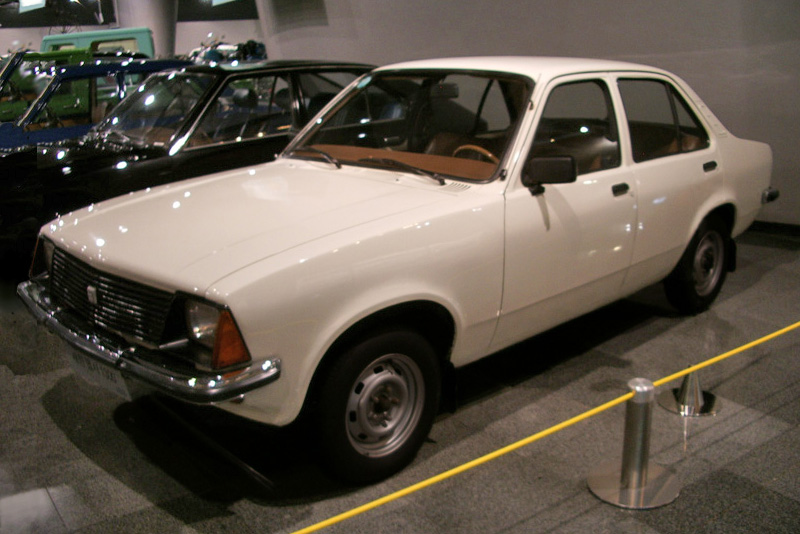
1982 Maepsy

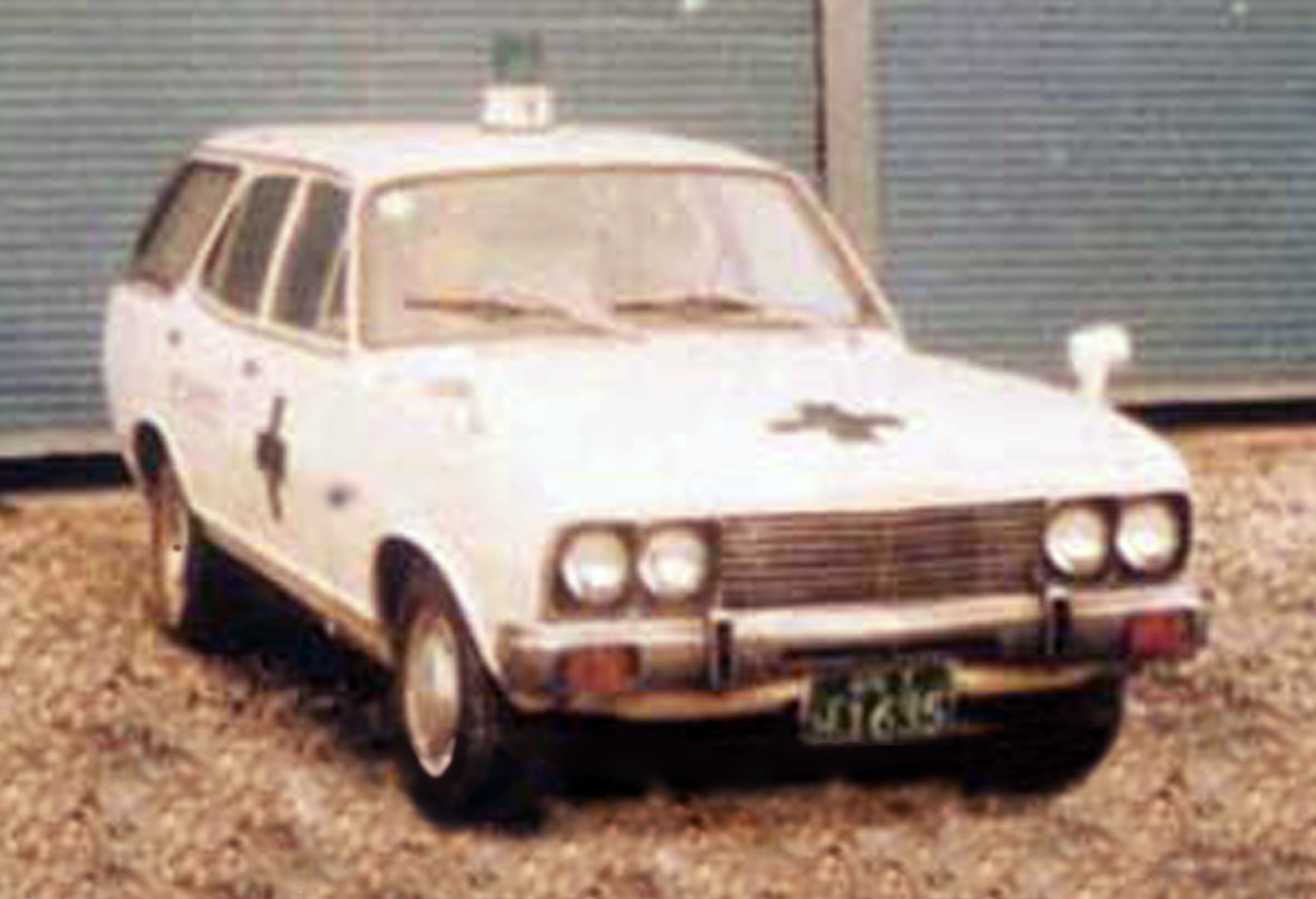
Camina wagon

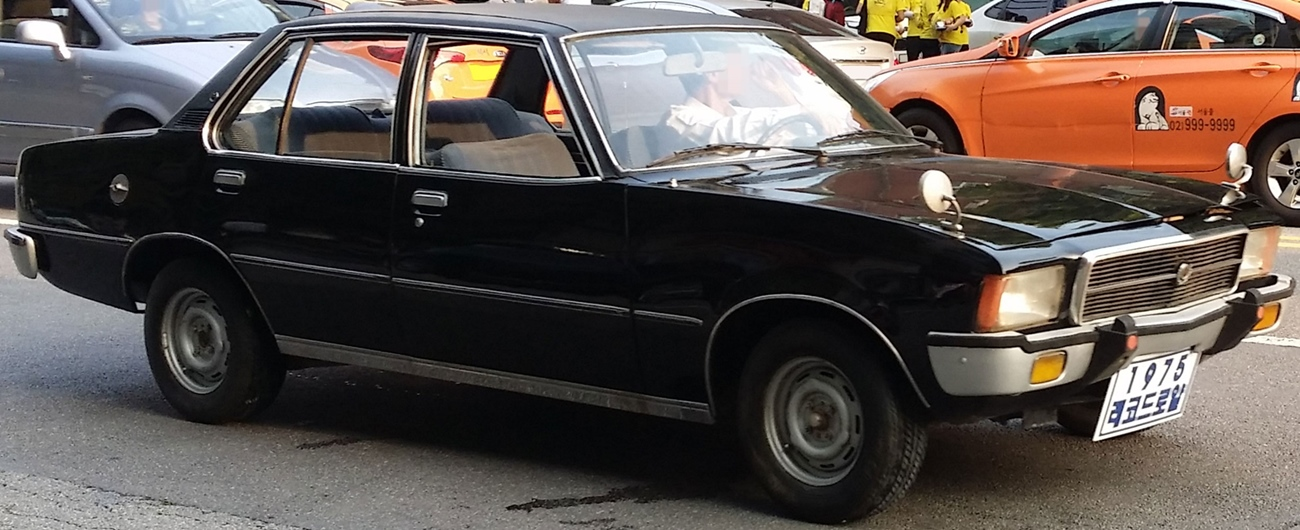
Rekord

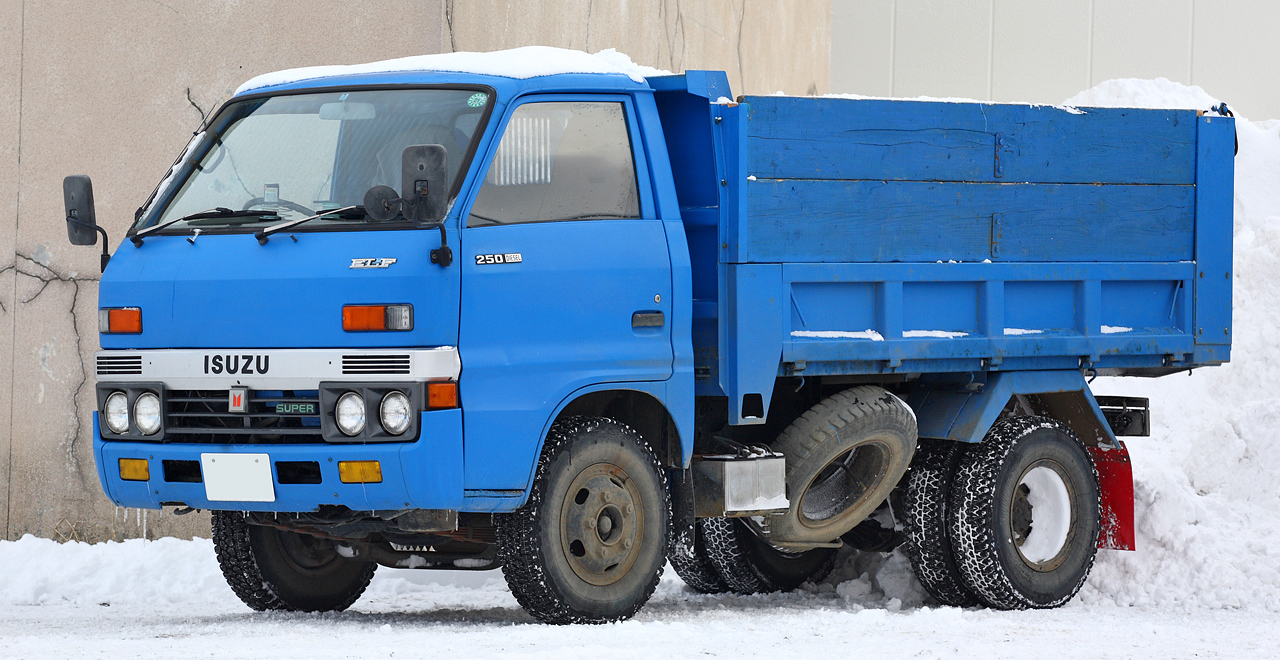
Elf

- Camina (Note: rebadged Holden.)
- Gemini
- Maepsy (Note: rebadged Daewoo.)
- Rekord (Note: Sold in diesel and automatic-transmission versions.)

=== Buses ===
- BU110 (Note: based on the Isuzu BU.)
- BF101 (Note: based on mid and double-entry doors.)
- BD101
- BL064

=== Trucks ===
- 8t Dump
- 11t Cargo
- Elf (Note: rebadged Isuzu.)
