= Daewoo Royale =

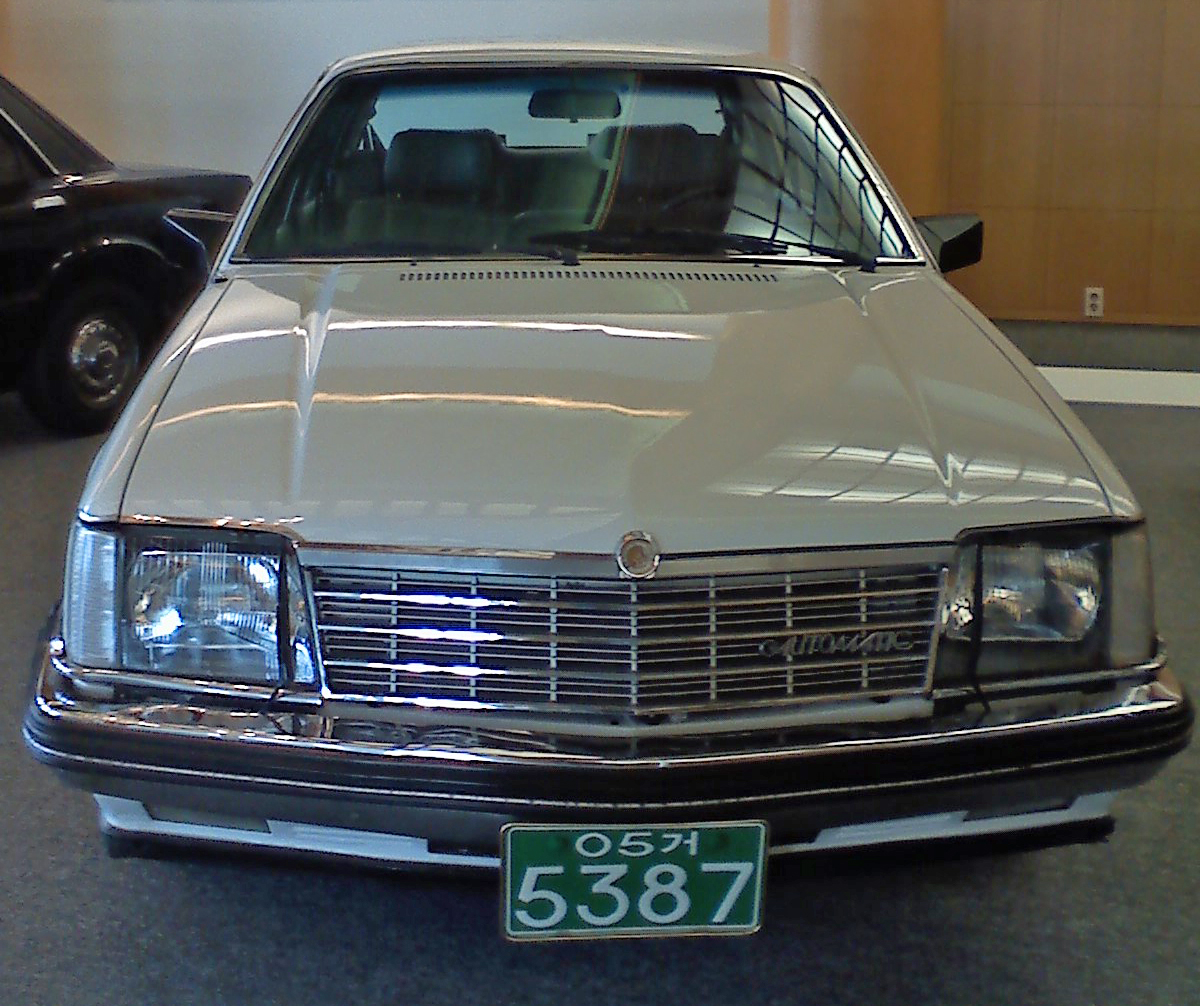
- Daewoo Royale Saloon (second generation)

Overview
- Manufacturer: General Motors Korea (Note: GMK was a joint venture established by Shinjin Motors and General Motors, not related to the GM Korea established in 2002 subsequent to Daewoo's bankruptcy.) (1972–1976); Saehan (1976–1983); Daewoo (1983–1993)
- Production: August 1972 – December 1993
- Assembly: South Korea: Bupyeong

Body and chassis
- Body style: 4-door sedan
- Layout: FR layout
- Platform: GM V

Chronology
- Successor: Daewoo Arcadia (replaced Imperial); Daewoo Prince (replaced Royale)

The Daewoo Royale is a series of mid-size cars that was produced by Daewoo in South Korea from 1983, being replaced by the Daewoo Prince in 1991, although production of the top-line Daewoo Imperial continued until 1993. The Royale's predecessor was launched in 1972 by General Motors Korea (GMK) as the Rekord, becoming the Saehan Rekord in 1976 when Saehan Motors replaced GMK, until production ended in 1978. This car was a version of the German Opel Rekord D.

The second generation Saehan Rekord was a development of the Opel Rekord E. Production began in 1978, along with the Saehan Royale. The Royale was the Rekord E bodyshell with the front grafted on from the Opel Senator A. The Saehan Royale became the Daewoo Royale in 1983, with Saehan Rekord being discontinued and incorporated into the Royale lineup as the Daewoo Royale XQ. In 1989, the flagship Daewoo Imperial was introduced, based on the standard Royale. While Royale production (excepting taxis) ended in 1991, Imperials continued until 1993, being replaced by the Daewoo Arcadia.

== First generation (1972–1978) ==
External images
- Rekord Premier
- Rekord Royale: , ,

First generation
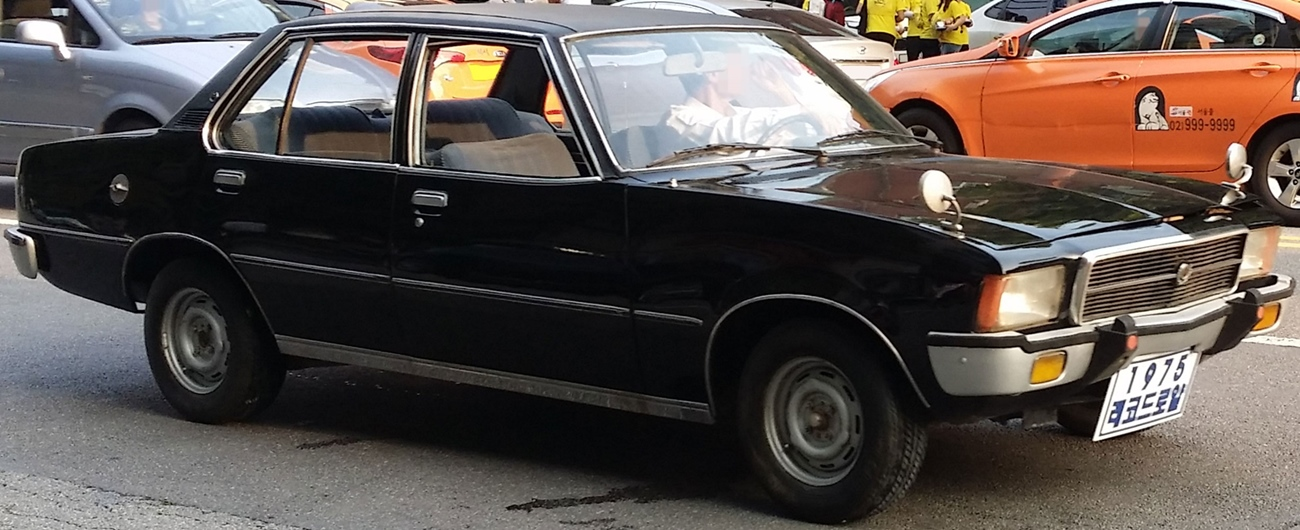
- 1975 GM Korea Rekord Royale

Overview
- Also called: Rekord: Opel Rekord D Rekord Royale: Opel Commodore B
- Production: August 1972 – August 1978

Powertrain
- Engine: 1.9 L Opel 19S I4
- Transmission: 4-speed manual 3-speed automatic

General Motors Korea (GMK) launched the Rekord in August 1972. The GMK Rekord was based on the German-designed Opel Rekord D. In August 1975, a version of the Rekord, known as the Rekord Royale was launched by GMK. The Royale version was based on the Opel Commodore B, which was essentially the Opel Rekord with a lengthened engine bay. 12,005 Royales were produced between 1975 and 1978. In November 1976, GMK changed its name to Saehan Motors, and as a result, the Rekord and Rekord Royale became the Saehan Rekord and Saehan Rekord Royale.

== Second generation (1978–1993) ==
Second generation
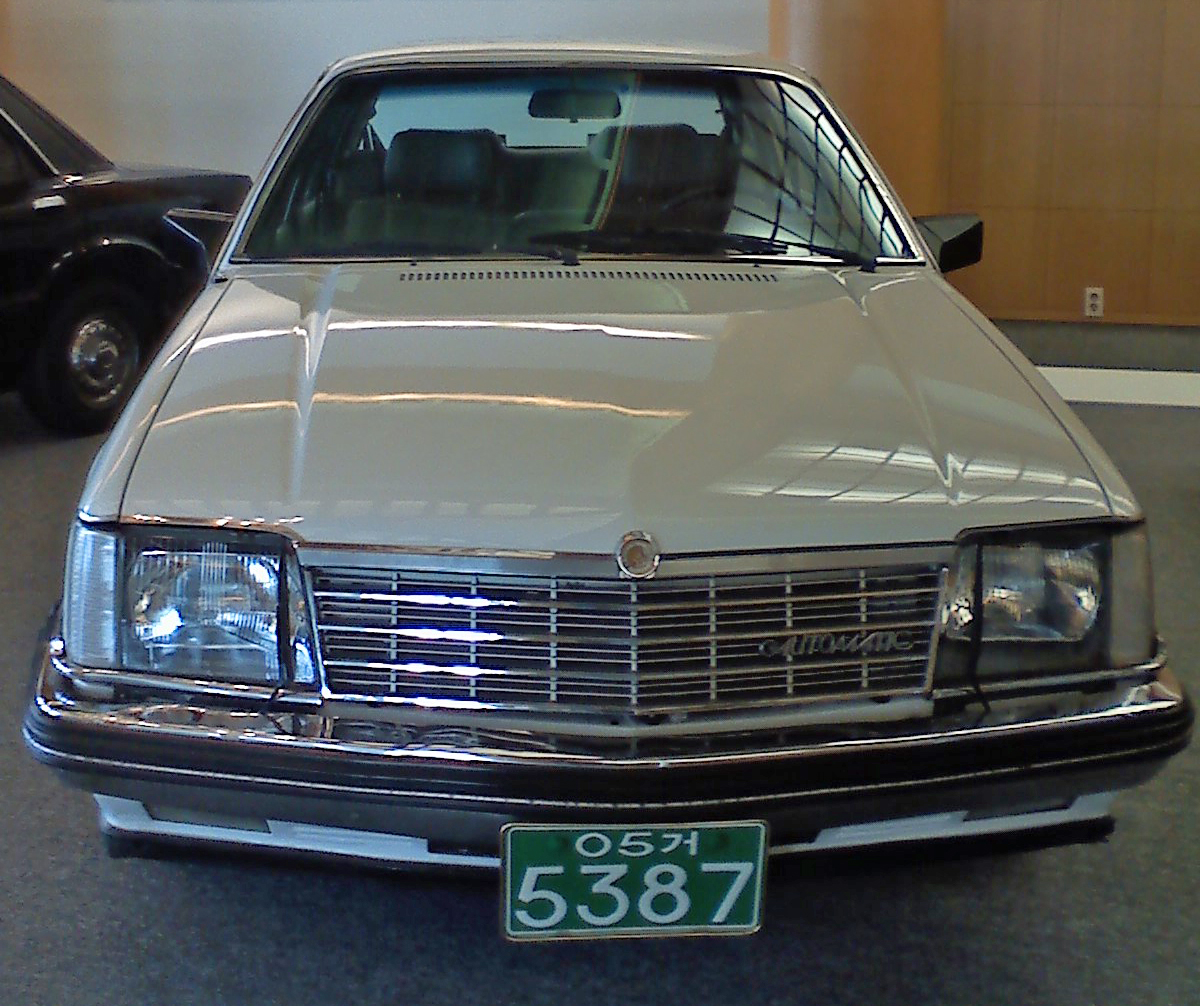

Overview
- Also called: Daewoo Imperial
- Production: August 1978 – May 1989 (Saehan Royale Diesel/Daewoo Royale Diesel); August 1978 – June 1991 (Saehan Royale/Daewoo Royale Prince); September 1980 – June 1991 (Saehan Royale Salon/Daewoo Royale Salon/Royale Salon Super/Royale Super Salon); August 1983 – May 1989 (Daewoo Royale XQ/Royale Duke); March 1989 – December 1993 (Daewoo Imperial); August 1982 – July 1993 (Taxi models)

Body and chassis
- Related: Rekord: Opel Rekord E Royale (early): Holden Commodore (VB–VH); Opel Rekord E1/Senator A1 (Commodore C); Royale (mid): Opel Rekord E2/Senator A2; Royale (late): Opel Senator A2

Powertrain
- Engine: Petrol: 1.5 L Daewoo XQ I4; 1.9 L Opel 19S I4; 2.0 L Opel 20S I4; 2.0 L Opel 20E I4; 3.0 L Opel 30E I6 (Imperial); LPG: 1.5 L Daewoo XQ I4 (1982–1988); 1.6 L Daewoo XQ I4 (1988–1993); 2.0 L Daewoo 20P (1989–1993); Diesel: 2.0 L Opel 20D Diesel I4 (1980–1989)
- Transmission: 4/5-speed manual 3/4-speed automatic

The second generation Saehan Rekord was based on the Opel Rekord E. It was introduced in 1978 along with the Saehan Royale, which was essentially the Rekord E, featuring the front-end of the larger Senator A.

In January 1983, after Daewoo gained control, Saehan Motors changed its name to Daewoo Motors. At the same time the Saehan Royale was renamed Daewoo Royale, and the Saehan Rekord was absorbed in the Royale range, becoming known as the Royale XQ. Production of the XQ ended in 1987.

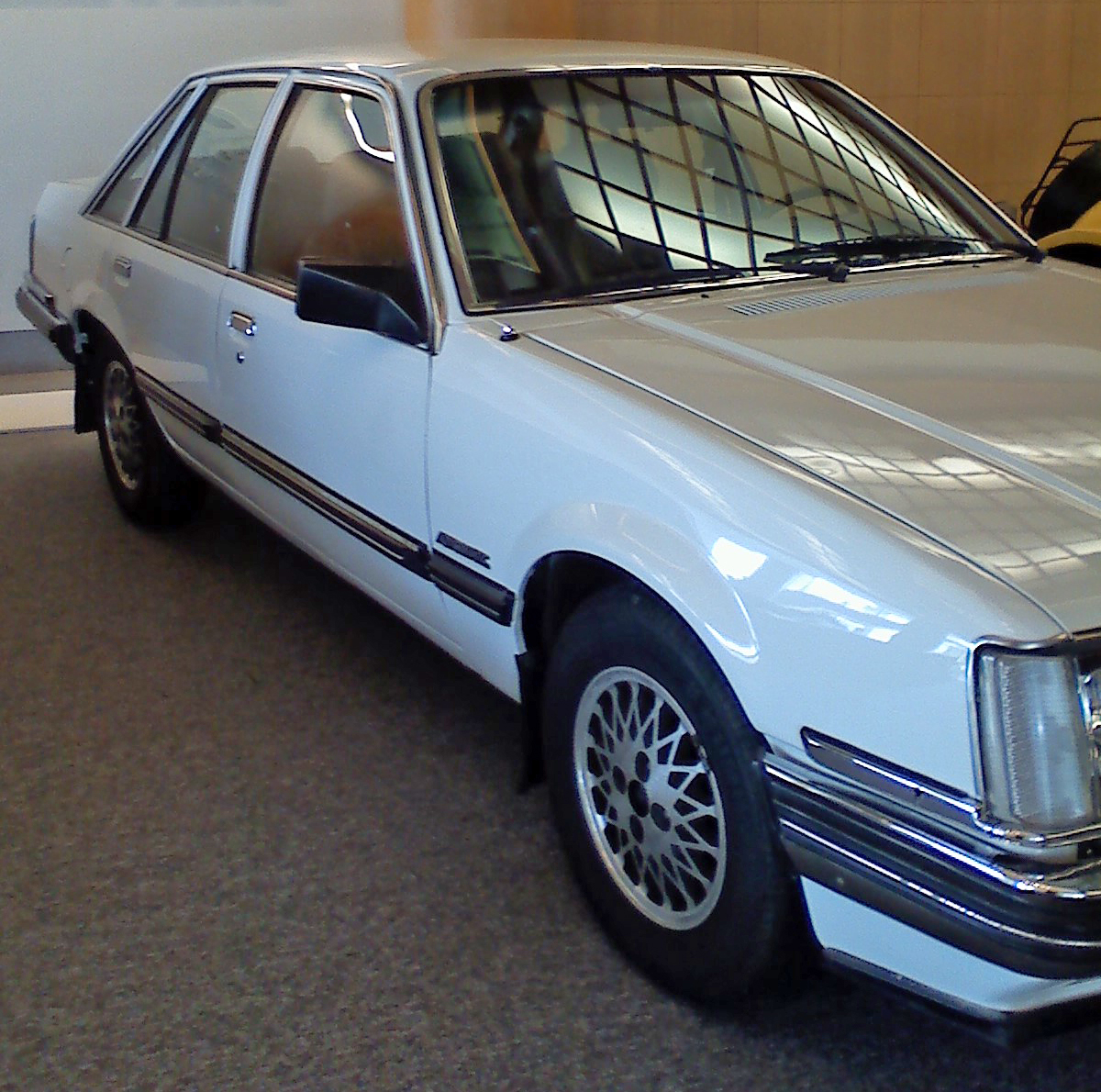
1986–1987 Daewoo Royale Salon Super

Until November 1984, Royale body panels were stamped by Holden in Australia, where the Rekord-Senator hybrid was manufactured there as the Holden Commodore. After November 1984, Daewoo began pressing their own panels on a newly installed production line. The E1 bodystyle continued to be built as the Royale XQ and Diesel, while the Prince received the Senator A2's front end. All Korean-built shells, however, received a unique rear pressing with large, somewhat sloped rectangular taillights, which increased the length by about 5 cm (2 in). The Royale Salon continued with the Senator A1 front end until it received a whole new front in 1987. The Royale Salon Super was introduced in 1986. However, unlike other Royales that utilised the Opel Rekord E2/Senator A2 hybrid with the four-window glasshouse design, the Salon Super used the six-window design from the Senator A. A second design revision came in 1987 with a new front-end design, featuring a revised grille and headlamps, along with minor trim changes. While lower-specification versions such as the Royale Salon retained the four-window design, the Royale Super Salon continued using the six-window design from the now discontinued Salon Super. The old-style XQ and Diesel received an all new front end of a smooth, upright, and rectangular appearance. 1989 marked another design change; the Royale Prince inherited a new grille insert and adopted the six-window glasshouse. From 1989, Daewoo introduced the top-of-the-range Imperial, which was marketed separate from the Royale range. Imperial production ended in 1993, replaced by the Daewoo Arcadia.

=== Specification levels ===
External images
- 1978: Rekord Royale, Rekord Royale,
- 1983
- 1985: Royale XQ, Diesel, Prince, Salon
- 1987: Royale Duke, Prince 1500, Super Salon
- 1989: Royale Prince, Imperial
- Various

Daewoo Royale engines were four-cylinder Opel units, with Daewoo offering the Royale in several different levels of luxury: the Diesel, Salon, Duke, XQ, and Prince:

- Royale Diesel (May 1980–April 1989): As the Royale Duke Diesel from early 1987; fitted with Opel's 2.0-liter diesel engine.
- Royale Salon (September 1980 – September 1991): fitted with a 1979 cc engine and three-speed automatic transmission. This powertrain combination produced 100 PS (74 kW) (DIN) and 156 N⋅m (115 ft⋅lb) (DIN). Top speed was claimed at 176 km/h (109 mph).
  - Royale Salon Super (March 1986 – 1987): This fully equipped model (digital dashboard, trip computer, EFI, etcetera) uses the Senator's six-window glass house.
  - Royale Super Salon (1987–1991): a facelift model of the Royal Salon Super with 2.0-liter EFI engine with trip computer, 9-band Equalizer audio and Seat Heating.
- Royale XQ (August 1983 – 1987): fitted with a 1492 cc engine and four-speed manual transmission. This powertrain combination produced 44 kW (60 PS; 59 hp) (DIN) and 100 N⋅m (74 ft⋅lb) (DIN). Top speed was claimed at 135 km/h (84 mph).
- Royale Duke (February 1987 – March 1989): a new lower-end model fitted with a more modern 1498 cc engine.
- Duke City (April 1988 – 1989): a version intended for taxi use, fitted with a 1.6-liter LPG engine. This became the Royale Prince LPG (also with a 2-litre engine) after 1989.
- Royale Prince (July 1983–June 1991): used the E2 bodywork, fitted with a 1897 cc engine and four-speed manual transmission. This powertrain combination produced 63 kW (86 PS; 84 hp) (DIN) and 142 N⋅m (105 ft⋅lb) (DIN). Top speed was claimed at 168 km/h (104 mph).
- Daewoo Imperial (February 1989 – mid-1993): the Imperial was the ultimate development of the Royale, developed in response to the Hyundai Sonata and Grandeur. Imperial styling was reminiscent of the contemporary Chrysler Imperial and New Yorker, but also some Japanese luxury sedans. Its formal roofline, and much revised front- and rear-end styling helped to cover up the car's Opel Senator roots. Imperial was specified with a vinyl roof, Bosch anti-lock brakes, digital instrumentation, cruise control, automatic climate control air conditioning, power windows, power door locks, power steering, a trip computer, and leather upholstery. A 2969 cc engine and four-speed automatic transmission was also fitted. This powertrain combination produced 135 kW SAE (184 PS) and 230 N⋅m (170 lb⋅ft), or 115 kW DIN (156 PS). Top speed was claimed at 195 km/h (121 mph). Outdated, and with a negative reputation for quality, the Imperial was outclassed by the new Hyundai Grandeur and only 863 examples were built in a little over four years.

== Bibliography ==
- Robertson, David (September 1984). "A new contender". Modern Motor. Sydney, New South Wales: Australian Consolidated Press.
- Schaefers, Martin (1998–2008). "Rekord body history". Far East Auto Literature.
