= BOL Champions season 1 =

BOL Champions
- Season 1
- Presented by: Waqar Zaka
- No. of housemates: 15
- Winner: Hammad Ali Khan
- Runner-up: Kashaf Ansari
- No. of episodes: 27

Release
- Original network: BOL TV
- Original release: 4 November 2019 – 16 December 2020

Season chronology
- Next → BOL House (Season 2)

Champions is a Pakistani youth-based reality show that airs on BOL Network. The episodes are also available online. Season 1 of the series premiered on 4 November 2019 and ended on 16 December 2020. It was followed by Season 2, which premiered on 18 December 2021.

Filming of the show takes place at the BOL House in Korangi Creek Cantonment, Karachi, which partially serves as Bol Network's headquarters. In Season 1, contestants lived in the house for 30 days from 4 January to 4 February 2020 until four finalists emerged.

The show was banned by PEMRA on 10 April 2020 citing telecast of vulgar and indecent content. In regard to the ban and the impact of the COVID-19 pandemic, the show was temporarily suspended without announcing a winner. After a hiatus of 6 months, the series continued airing the remaining episodes in November 2020 concluding with a two-part Grand Finale where Hammad Ali Khan from Karachi was crowned winner of the season.

Champions was the subject of viewer complaints and press attention regarding a variety of controversial issues, including vulgarity, the well-being of certain participants, and discrimination based on sexuality and color. Despite receiving criticism for its graphic nature throughout its run, the series became one of the most-watched television telecasts in Pakistan. The eighteenth episode of the series attracted 15 million viewers, making it Bol Network's most-watched broadcast. As the series entered March, viewership declined sharply amidst favoritism and clickbaiting complaints from audiences.

== Format ==
The show is a Pakistani adaptation of the Indian reality show Bigg Boss. Hosted by Waqar Zaka, it used a mixed format which incorporated open auditions for contestant selection who were then later confined to a Big Brother-style surveillance house. The contestants would leave the house occasionally to perform tasks where performance outcomes along with nominations would result in elimination of one or more housemates. Waqar Zaka has stated on numerous occasions that the competition has no specific format.

== Contestants ==
Ages, names, and cities stated are at time of filming.

Contestant	Age	Hometown	Outcome
Balach Masud	28	Quetta, Balochistan	Evicted
Rehan Jutt	26	Lahore, Punjab	Evicted
Zeeshan Ahmed	28	Hyderabad, Sindh	Evicted
Maria Jan	25	Karachi, Sindh	Evicted
Muhammad Yahya	17	Karachi, Sindh	Evicted
Abiha Fatima	22	Karachi, Sindh	Evicted
Tooba Mansoor	23	Karachi, Sindh	Evicted
Daniya Kanwal	22	Malir, Sindh	Evicted
Rubaisha Ajaz	22	Karachi, Sindh	Evicted
Sidra Lakhani	33	Karachi, Sindh	Evicted
Muhammad Bilal	22	Karachi, Sindh	Walked
Rabail Sheikh	29	Islamabad	Evicted
Aamir Siyal	24	Larkana, Sindh	Evicted
Kashaf Ansari	24	Karachi, Sindh	Runner-up
Hammad Ali Khan	25	Karachi, Sindh	Winner

== Episodes ==
Episode no.	Original air date	Summary	TV Viewers (millions)	Source
1–11	4 November – 30 December 2019	Auditions Open auditions were held in Karachi by Waqar Zaka and lasted for 3 days. The audition format remained the same from sister reality shows produced by Waqar Zaka and hopefuls successful in these auditions gained direct entry to the BOL House. After the auditions took place Zaka handpicked Aamir, Abiha, Baba Atif, Balach, Bilal, Daniya, Hammad, Kashaf, Rabail, Rehan, Rubaisha, Tooba, and Yahya to enter the house. Note: Hareem and Sandal were selected during open auditions but did not enter the house with other contestants.	7.78 (cumulative average)	
1–11	4 November – 30 December 2019	Video Profiling After open auditions ended hopefuls in the waiting list were given a second chance to gain entry into the house. Video profiles were submitted by auditionees and social media likes and views along with Zaka's final say determined selection. In this way Maria, Sidra, and Zeeshan were selected to join the other contestants.	7.78 (cumulative average)	
12	6 January 2020	Champions Culling Round 15 contestants introduce themselves to each other and the studio audience and battled for beds inside the house since it contains only space for 8. Waqar Zaka tells them that they may have an impostor amongst them and the housemates must identify and evict the impostor. Note: Baba Atif leaves the show, before contracts to enter the house were signed, due to family issues.	8.12	
13	13 January 2020	Day 1 The contestants enter the house, unpack their belongings, and spend their first night inside the house by sharing beds with the housemates who won theirs during the culling round. The episode ends with housemates waking up and rushing to get to their first task location.	8.43	
14	20 January 2020	Day 1 – Day 2 The contestants reach the task location – Boat Basin famous for its busy street food and markets. Immunity Challenge: Contestants were blindfolded, spun around, and asked to reach a previously shown location (gazebo) in a park. Hammad won by reaching the area the fastest and was exempt from participating in the elimination task. Elimination Challenge: Contestants form two teams of eight and seven and assign a captain. The captain chooses a team member to get slapped by restaurant goers in exchange for eating the food on their table. Team 1: Balach, Zeeshan, Rabail, Yahya, Daniya, Rehan, and Aamir Team 2: Sidra, Tooba, Rubaisha, Kashaf, Abiha, Maria, and Bilal Waqar Zaka eliminates Sidra, Balach, Rehan, Tooba and Zeeshan for poor performance in the task.	10.6	
15	27 January 2020	Day 2 All contestants return to the house. Before the eliminated contestants could finish packing Waqar Zaka gathers them in the living room and asks the current placeholders which eliminated contestants they think did not deserve to get evicted. Daniya, Kashaf, Rubaisha, Rabail, and Aamir raise their hands becoming whistleblowers. Consequently, whistleblowers became immune and nominated a current contestant to swap their place with an eliminated one. Sidra, Balach, Tooba, Rehan, and Zeeshan are chosen to swap with Abiha, Hammad, Maria, Bilal, and Yahya. Elimination Challenge: Nominated contestants are required to battle the contestant who nominated them. The task is to roll an egg, without breaking it, to the end of the platform before the opponent does. If a nominated contestant wins they retain their place in the house, otherwise, they replace the eliminated contestant chosen to swap with them. Kashaf and Rabail were the only two participants to win their battle without breaking any rules. In the next phase, they battle each other where Kashaf wins but is later disqualified for breaking the rules. The challenge ends with no result. Waqar Zaka announces that none of the eliminated contestants will return. The remaining contestants are instructed to pair themselves with another contestant for the next elimination challenge. Day 3 Elimination Challenge – Part 1: The 10 remaining contestants take part in a Q&A with Waqar Zaka as five teams of two. The first round of questions involved queries regarding Islam and punishment for answering incorrectly is spanking and whipping. Pairs : Bilal & Rubaisha, Aamir & Rabail, Hammad & Maria, Kashaf & Yahya, and Abiha & Daniya. Fearing physical injury due to the punishment, Hammad quits the challenge, eliminating himself and Maria from the game. They return to the house, pack their belongings, and are evicted from the house.	9.21	
16	3 February 2020	Day 3 Elimination Challenge – Part 2: The 8 remaining contestants head to the Jacuzzi area of the house where Waqar Zaka explains the details of the challenge. The challenge requires finding gold coins scattered on the Jacuzzi floor. When a contestant finds a gold coin, they raise their hand and call out their feat, the task pauses and they eliminate an existing participant. The task ends when a sole survivor emerges. Result: Daniya eliminates Aamir, Kashaf eliminates Bilal and then Abiha, Daniya eliminates Kashaf, Rubaisha and then Rabail back-to-back, Yahya eliminates Daniya becoming the sole winner of the challenge. Yahya is given the power to eliminate two contestants of his choice. He chooses Aamir and Abiha. Waqar Zaka reveals a twist in which from this point onward in the game all eliminated contestants will remain in the house with Loser status. The losers can disrupt and menace the existing housemates' belonging in an attempt to frustrate them into leaving the house and replacing them. If any of the losers decides to leave the house the prize money will be halved.	11.17	
17	10 February 2020	Day 4 Existing contestants and losers return to the house. Pandemonium breaks loose as Aamir and Abiha cause havoc inside the house. Abiha and Aamir empty Kashaf, Daniya, Rubaisha, Bilal, and Yahya's suitcases, throw water on them, and destroy food items. Kashaf and Daniya get into a heated argument with Rabail. Later, Aamir and Bilal console Rabail who is itching to physically beat Kashaf. The episode ends with Abiha crying because Rabail aired her personal family issues to other housemates.	12.80	
18	17 February 2020	Day 4 – Day 5 Rabail gets into a physical altercation with Yahya and throws her slipper at him. Contestants are called to the rooftop for a challenge. Reward Challenge: Contestants have to balance a pot full of burning coal using a mount on their heads while circling around a central platform. When Waqar Zaka calls out "Thumka" they must try to eliminate a contestant by making their pot fall using only pelvic thrust movement. Result: Bilal quits as soon as the task begins being not able to withstand the heat from the burning coal. Daniya eliminates Abiha. Rabail and Aamir team up and target the other alliance members one by one eliminating everyone else. Aamit volunteers to lose making Rabail the winner. Rabail wins a Rebel watch and gifts it to Aamir. Rabail is disqualified by Waqar Zaka for physical violence toward Kashaf and Yahya. In a rage, she attacks Kashaf beating her repeatedly, and leaves the challenge location to return to the house. While housemates discuss these proceedings of the night Waqar Zaka announces that Rabail may stay in the house as loser and can earn entry back into the game. Two alliances clearly emerge. The alliance of Kashaf, Daniya, Yahya, and Rubaisha is enraged and contemplates quitting the show. Day 5 Contestants reach the location of the elimination challenge. They are instructed to form pairs. Kashaf and Rubaisha choose each other. Yahya pairs with Daniya and Bilal is left alone. Waqar tells Bilal to convince Daniya into pairing with him instead. Daniya changes her vote to Bilal after reaching a truce with the Losers to not mess with her belongings inside the house. Yahya is left with no one to pair with and is eliminated.	14.83	
19	24 February 2020	Day 5 Elimination Challenge – Part 1: Contestants have to wrestle each other inside a marked circular area and attempt to force players out of the field until two finalists remain. Result: Abiha and Aamir join hands and successfully force all contestants out of the circle except Bilal. Time runs out and all three of them are declared winners. Aamir and Abiha return to the competition and Bilal retains his player status. Daniya, Kashaf, and Rubaisha are eliminated and become Losers. Elimination Challenge – Part 2: All contestants participate in a game of Pitho Garam. The last remaining player with the fewest ball hits wins. Result: Rabail and Daniya emerge as Top 2 with an equal number of pitho retrieved. Since Rabail was hit by the ball fewer times than Daniya, she wins the challenge and returns to the competition. Day 6 Contestants are greeted by Waqar Zaka and are introduced to Sidra and Maria who were previously evicted. Waqar tells them that Sidra and Maria can return to the competition by replacing an existing house player. Sidra challenges Yahya while Maria picks Rubaisha.	12.18	
20	2 March 2020	Day 6 Wild Card Challenge – Part 1: Maria, Sidra, Yahya, and Rubaisha compete in a questionnaire-based scavenger hunt. They have to retrieve cue cards with a question written on them. When a player finds one they attempt the question or challenge a wild card entrant. The player who answers the most questions correctly stays in the house. Result: Sidra and Maria score more points than Yahya and Rubaisha and return to the competition. Yahya and Rubaisha are consequently evicted. Waqar Zaka returns to tell housemates that Yahya and Rubaisha were fake evicted in a twist and Sidra and Maria knew the answers to the questionnaire beforehand. Yahya and Rubaisha return alongside Hammad and contestants are taken to the next task's location for the second phase of the wild card challenge. Wild Card Challenge – Part 2: All eleven contestants attempt to retrieve a marked wooden pole by treading in reverse. Once the pole is retrieved everyone must race to the starting line. Three rounds take place and the winner and runners-up of each round sit out the later rounds becoming immune from elimination. Result: Hammad wins Round 1 while Aamir and Maria come in second and third respectively. Yahya wins Round 2. Rabail wins Round 3 and is given the power to directly eliminate three contestants. She chooses Kashaf, Daniya, and Rubaisha.	9.31	
21	9 March 2020	Day 7 Elimination Challenge: Contestants form pairs and attempt to convince passers-by in a busy area to eat 5 eggs with the shell intact. The number of eggs eaten determines rank in the challenge. Result: Yahya & Abiha come in last with a score of 2, Hammad & Sidra come in third with a score of 3, Rabail & Aamir come in second with a score of 4. Bilal & Maria win the task with the maximum score of 5. Bilal & Maria are instructed to make a collective decision to eliminate two contestants directly. They choose Yahya and Rabail who are consequently evicted from the house.	7.12	
22	16 March 2020	Day 8 Elimination Challenge: Contestants form pairs and attempt to convince people in vehicles, that are momentarily stopping at a traffic light, to buy two roses for the most price they can manage. Additionally, they must tickle as many people in the time frame allotted. Result: Hammad & Maria are disqualified for collecting money from people outside the sale of the roses. It is revealed they would have won the challenge otherwise because they tickled the most people. Aamir & Sidra are unable to sell any roses. Bilal & Abiha win the task. Bilal & Abiha are instructed to make a collective decision to eliminate two contestants directly. They choose Hammad and Sidra who are consequently evicted from the house. Day 9 Advantage Challenge: Aamir, Abiha, Bilal, and Maria play a game of pool where each has to call out a ball number for every player's individual turn while the player must attempt to score that numbered ball to win advantage in the next phase of the task. Result: Aamir scores a ball called by Bilal while the rest score none. Since Bilal's ball was scored he will have to do 3 tasks in the next phase. Aamir having acquired the advantage now only has to do 2 tasks. Before the elimination task is revealed Bilal discusses Maria's demand for cigarettes. Maria is embarrassed by the revelation and leaves the house.	5.39	
23	30 March 2020	Day 9 Elimination Challenge:	5.02	
24	30 March 2020	Day X Elimination Challenge:		
25		Day X Elimination Challenge:		

== Progress history ==
Episode:	15			16		18	19			20					21		22		23		25				Finale		
Vote to:	Swap				Evict	Save	Replace			Replace				Evict		Evict		Evict		Evict			Evict				
Hammad	Not eligible		LOST	Walked							WIN	SAFE	SAFE	Exempt	LOST	Not eligible	LOST	Not eligible	Evicted		Walked				WIN	SAFE	Winner
Kashaf	1	Zeeshan (with Hammad)	~~WIN~~	LOST	Not eligible	Rubaisha	Not eligible	LOST	LOST	Not eligible	LOST	LOST	LOST	Not eligible	Evicted						Sidra, Tooba	WIN	Rabail, Sidra	LOST	WIN	SAFE	Runner-up
Aamir	2	Balach (with Yahya)	LOST	LOST	Not eligible	Exempt	Kashaf	TOP 3	LOST	Not eligible	TOP 3	SAFE	SAFE	Exempt	LOST	Not eligible	LOST	Not eligible	LOST	Not eligible	Maria, Rubaisha	LOST	Evicted		LOST	WIN	Evicted
Rabail	3	Rehan (with Bilal)	~~WIN~~	LOST	Not eligible	Exempt	Rubaisha	LOST	WIN	Not eligible	LOST	LOST	WIN	Kashaf, Daniya, Rubaisha	LOST	Not eligible	Evicted				Kashaf, Maria	WIN	Rubaisha, Kashaf	SAFE	LOST	Evicted	
Bilal	Not eligible		LOST	LOST	Not eligible	Daniya	Not eligible	TOP 3	LOST	Not eligible	LOST	LOST	LOST	Not eligible	WIN	Yahya, Rabail	WIN	Hammad, Sidra	WIN	Abiha	Abiha, Kashaf	SAFE	Rubaisha, Kashaf	SAFE	LOST	Walked	
Sidra	Not eligible		OUT	Evicted						Yahya	LOST	LOST	LOST	Not eligible	LOST	Not eligible	LOST	Not eligible	Evicted		Abiha, Maria	SAFE	Kashaf, Rubaisha	SAFE	LOST	LOST	Evicted
Rubaisha	4	Tooba (with Maria)	LOST	LOST	Not eligible	Kashaf	Not eligible	LOST	LOST	Nominated	LOST	LOST	LOST	Not eligible	Evicted						Sidra, Rabail	SAFE	Rabail, Sidra	WIN	LOST	LOST	Evicted
Daniya	5	Sidra (with Abiha)	LOST	LOST	Not eligible	~~Yahya~~; Bilal	Not eligible	LOST	LOST	Not eligible	LOST	LOST	LOST	Not eligible	Evicted						Aamir, Rabail	SAFE	Rabail, Sidra	SAFE	LOST	LOST	Evicted
Tooba	Not eligible		OUT	Evicted																	Kashaf, Maria	SAFE	Rubaisha, Kashaf	SAFE	LOST	LOST	Evicted
Abiha	Not eligible		LOST	LOST	Not eligible	Exempt	Bilal	TOP 3	LOST	Not eligible	LOST	LOST	LOST	Not eligible	LOST	Not eligible	WIN	Hammad, Sidra	LOST	Not eligible	Aamir, Tooba	SAFE	Kashaf, Rubaisha	SAFE	LOST	LOST	Evicted
Yahya	Not eligible		LOST	WIN	Aamir, Abiha	Daniya	Daniya	LOST	LOST	Nominated	LOST	WIN	SAFE	Exempt	LOST	Not eligible	Evicted								LOST	LOST	Evicted
Maria	Not eligible		LOST	Evicted						Rubaisha	TOP 3	SAFE	SAFE	Exempt	WIN	Yahya, Rabail	LOST	Not eligible	Walked		Aamir, Rabail	LOST	Evicted				
Zeeshan	Not eligible		OUT	Evicted																							
Rehan	Not eligible		OUT	Evicted																							
Balach	Not eligible		OUT	Evicted																							
Notes	1			2	none	3, 4	none		5	6, 7	8			none	9					none	10						11, 12
Walked	none			Hammad	none												Maria		none		Hammad	none			Bilal	none	
Disqualified	none					Rabail	none																				
Result	Sidra, Balach, Rehan, Tooba, Zeeshan			Maria	Aamir, Abiha	Yahya	Daniya, Rubaisha, Kashaf		Rabail Daniya, Kashaf, Rubaisha, Yahya	Yahya, Rubaisha	Hammad				Yahya, Rabail		Hammad, Sidra		Abiha		Abiha, Daniya, Kashaf, Rabail, Rubaisha, Sidra, Tooba	Kashaf, Rabail	Kashaf		Kashaf, Hammad	Rabail	Aamir
Result	Sidra, Balach, Rehan, Tooba, Zeeshan			Maria	Aamir, Abiha	Yahya	Aamir, Abiha		Rabail Daniya, Kashaf, Rubaisha, Yahya	Maria, Sidra	Kashaf, Daniya, Rubaisha				Yahya, Rabail		Hammad, Sidra		Abiha		Abiha, Daniya, Kashaf, Rabail, Rubaisha, Sidra, Tooba	Aamir, Maria	Kashaf		Kashaf, Hammad	Aamir	Aamir

This contestant(s) was eliminated
This contestant won the elimination challenge
This contestant won the elimination challenge and returned to the competition
This contestant was eliminated but returned to the competition as a Wild Card Challenger
This contestant was granted power to directly eliminate contestant(s)
This contestant returned to the competition
This contestant was fake evicted

=== Notes ===
- ^1: Swap nominations were done openly and whistleblower contestants were nominated as per the order stated with each turn reducing the number of eligible contestants that can be nominated. The whistleblower contestants were immune during voting. Numbers represent turn order.
- ^2: Maria was paired with Hammad for the duration of the task. She was eliminated as Hammad quit.
- ^3: Rabail was disqualified however she was not ejected and remained in the house to earn entry back into the game.
- ^4: Daniya initially formed a pair with Yahya but later changed her vote to Bilal.
- ^5: Collective results of all tasks on Day 5 were not announced. All remaining players returned to the game.
- ^6: Sidra and Maria nominated one housemate each against whom they would compete in a task to replace.
- ^7: Wild Card task was staged. Yahya and Rubaisha were fake evicted and returned to the house the next day.
- ^8: First two rounds of the task decided players who would become safe from elimination and sit out later round(s). The third round was played for the power of elimination.
- ^9: Winners of the elimination challenge were required to evict two housemates in a collective decision.
- ^10: Previously evicted housemates returned to the house as Wild Card Challengers to gain entry back into the game by replacing existing finalists.
- ^11: Sidra served as a proxy for Aamir after he was unable to perform the final task.
- ^12: All contestant placements after the Final 3 are reflected by their last known qualifying position in the game.

== Criticism and controversy ==
=== Selection of certain housemates ===
The programme attracted criticism in December 2019 for putting several vulnerable people through the auditions. Rabail Sheikh, an aspiring model, who had a history of substance abuse and suffered from intermittent explosive disorder, was selected after she attempted to expose a cricketer by threatening to leak a lewd video as leverage. There was no psychological test done to screen any participants to determine whether they were fit to enter the house. Muhammad Yahya had an arm disability, Muhammad Bilal had a cleft palate and difficulty in speaking, and Daniya Kanwal who suffered from asthma were all selected in auditions as token diversity.

=== Legal complications and censorship ===
During the auditions Rabail revealed that she has a private video of a famous Pakistani cricketer who had allegedly stripped down on webcam and showed her his genitals in the video. The video was blurred during the telecast and Rabail was persuaded to delete it in order for her to get selected as a contestant. However, it is alleged that the video is still in the possession of Rabail.
Hareem Shah and Sandal Khattak appeared during auditions and discussed their media scandals in detail on the show. They claimed to have videos and audio recordings of news anchor Mubashir Lucman and Interior Minister Sheikh Rasheed. Prior to the show, they had released several snippets of their conversation with Lucman and Rasheed as evidence which became popular on social media in mid-2019. Waqar Zaka revealed that Bol Network had received threats from Lucman's team to pursue legal action against the network to stop the telecast of the episodes featuring Shah and Khattak. Shah and Khattak were selected to become housemates but did not enter the house amidst these complications.

On 10 April 2020, Pakistan Electronic Media Regulatory Authority (PEMRA) passed the motion to ban the show and imposed an Rs. 1 million fine on the network. The notice cited vulgarity and indecency of content being telecast and that it did not align with the religious, social, and cultural values of the country as the reason for the ban. As a result, no winner was announced and the cash prize was not awarded to any of the finalists.

=== Discrimination and abuse ===
The production was heavily criticized for its leniency towards unacceptable behavior among housemates and telecasting strong themes under the pretense of family show. Caste-based discrimination and colorism were primary underlying themes in conversations inside the house. Bol Network received 1574 complaints after Episode 17 was aired regarding Rabail and Aamir's behavior toward Kashaf. Rabail alongside Aamir called Kashaf dark, fat and ugly on several instances, spat on her, destroyed her clothes and physically assaulted her repeatedly after an elimination task. On a separate occasion Rabail sprayed Daniya with an aerosol spray triggering an asthma attack for which she had to be hospitalized for the night. Rabail was disqualified but made to stay on the show to garner more ratings hence rewarding her behavior.

Rabail, on day 2, outed Hammad telling housemates that he had confided in her about the past lover he mentioned during auditions being a man. Previous to this incident many housemates including Daniya, Tooba, and Sidra had referred to Hammad as meetha a derogatory term used in Urdu for homosexual or effeminate men. Hammad came out as straight on his YouTube channel after he was evicted.
