= Rehman Town, Islamabad =

Pakistani

Rehman Town رحمن ٹاؤن
- City District
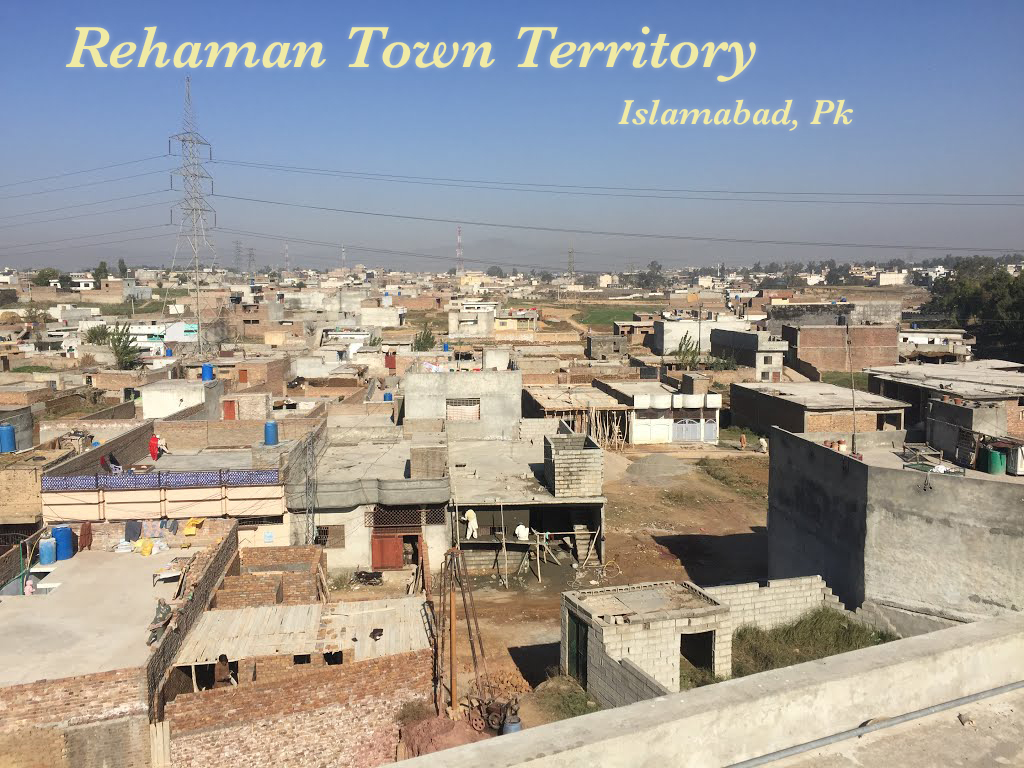
- Motto: New Development of Islamabad
- Location In Pakistan
- Coordinates: 33°37′14.67″N 72°56′18.87″E
- Country: Pakistan
- Territory: Islamabad Capital Territory

Area
  - Total: 25.00 km^{2} (9.65 sq mi)

Population (2020)
  - Total: 5,600
  - Density: 220/km^{2} (580/sq mi)
- Time zone: UTC+5 (PST)
- Area code: 051
- Website: Official Website

Rehman Town (Urdu: رحمان ٹاؤن) is a new town in the H-15 Sector of Islamabad. The H sectors of Islamabad are mostly dedicated to educational and health institutions. National University of Sciences and Technology covers a major portion of sector H-12.

It has a private school, hospital, parks and other facilities. It is near the Chowk and Kashmir highway and the Daewoo Pakistan bus stop..

== Gallery ==
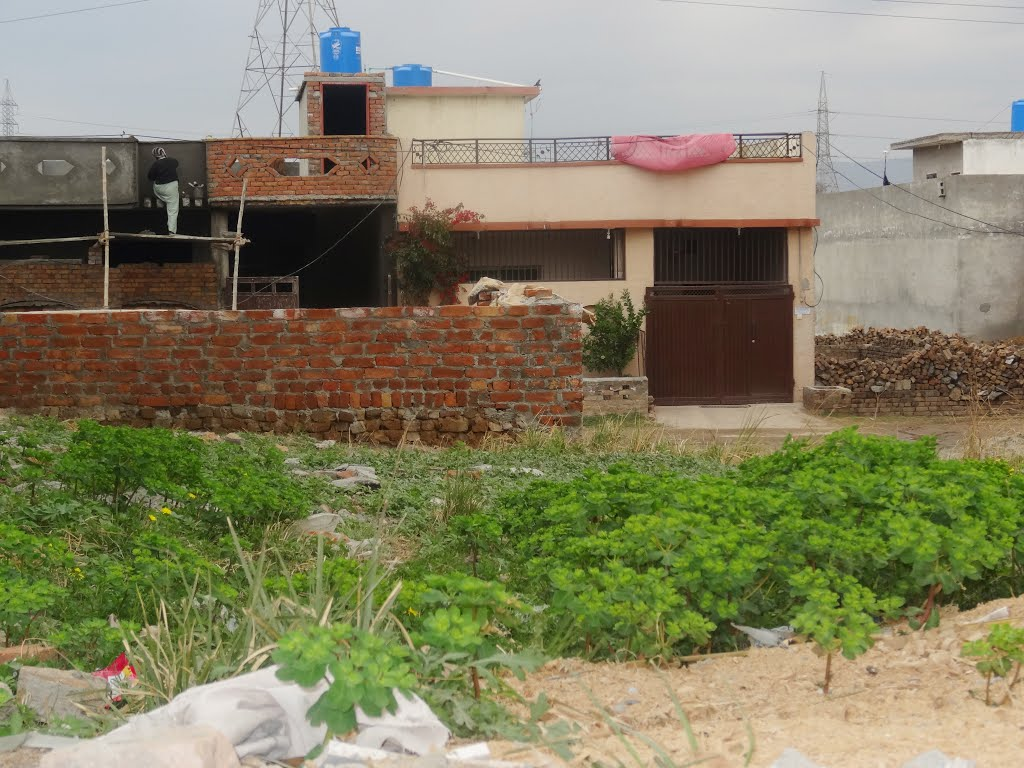
Rehman Town Beauty

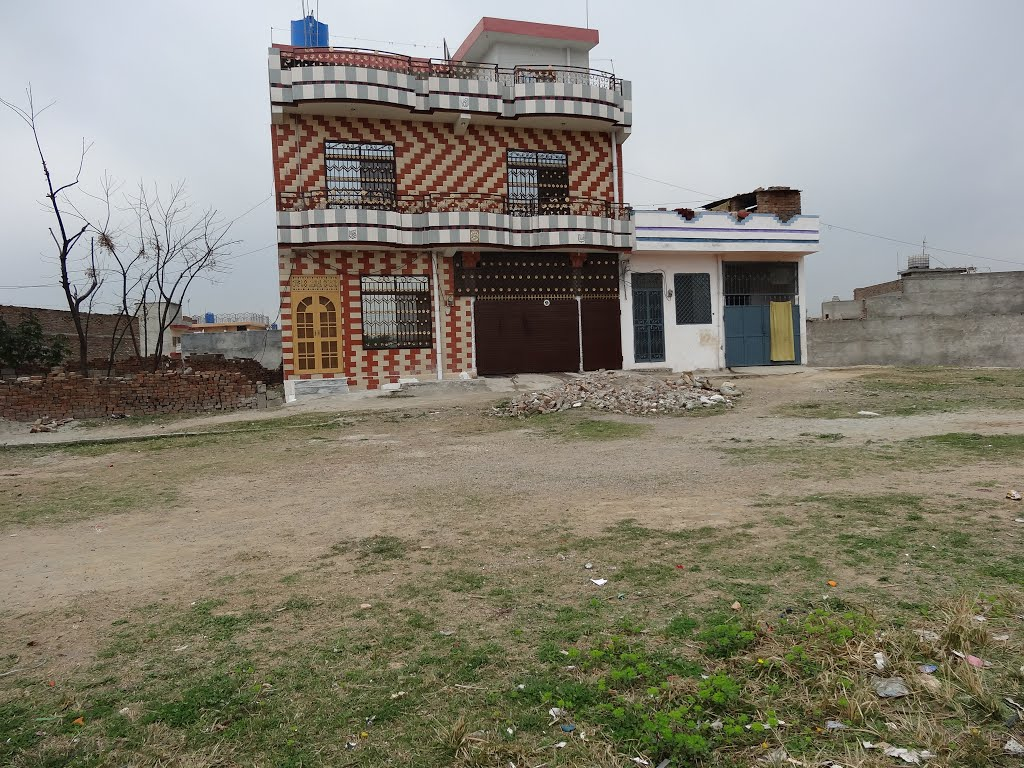
Brilliant View

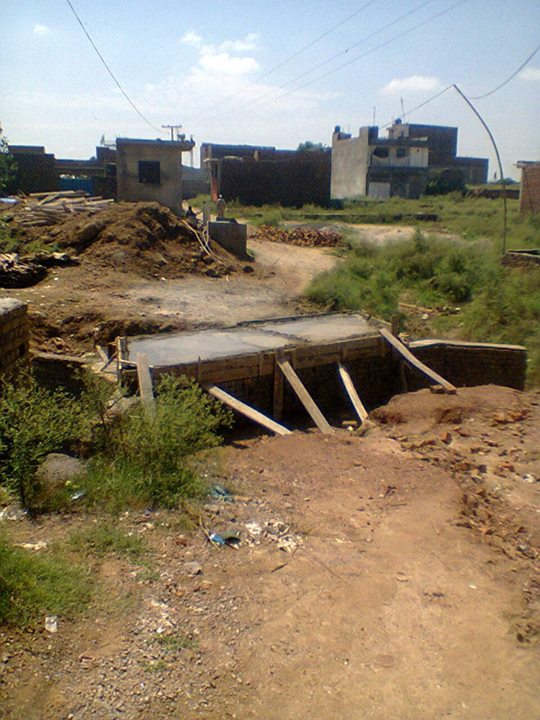
Bridge Construction

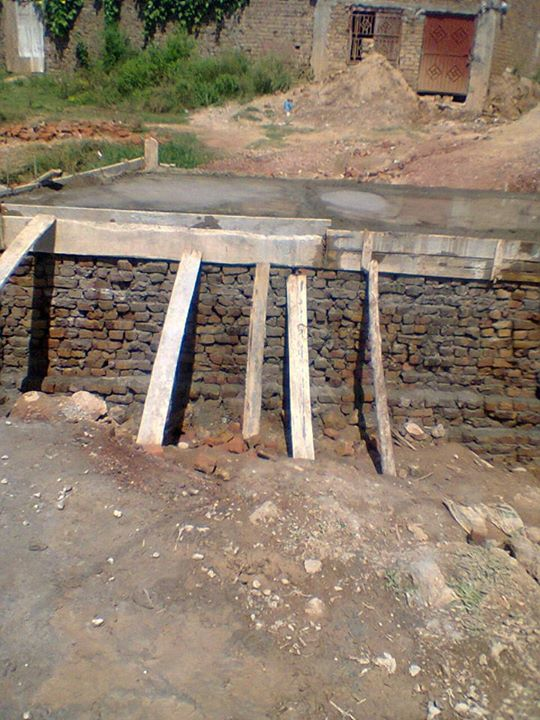
New Construction

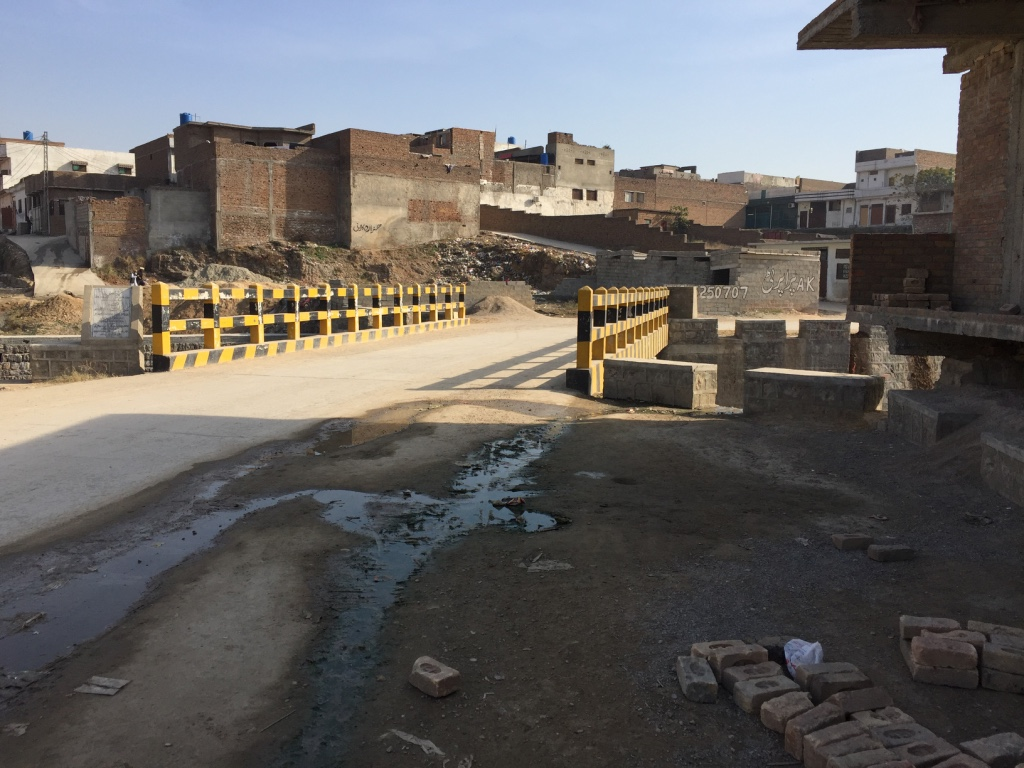
Shair Shah Suri Bridge

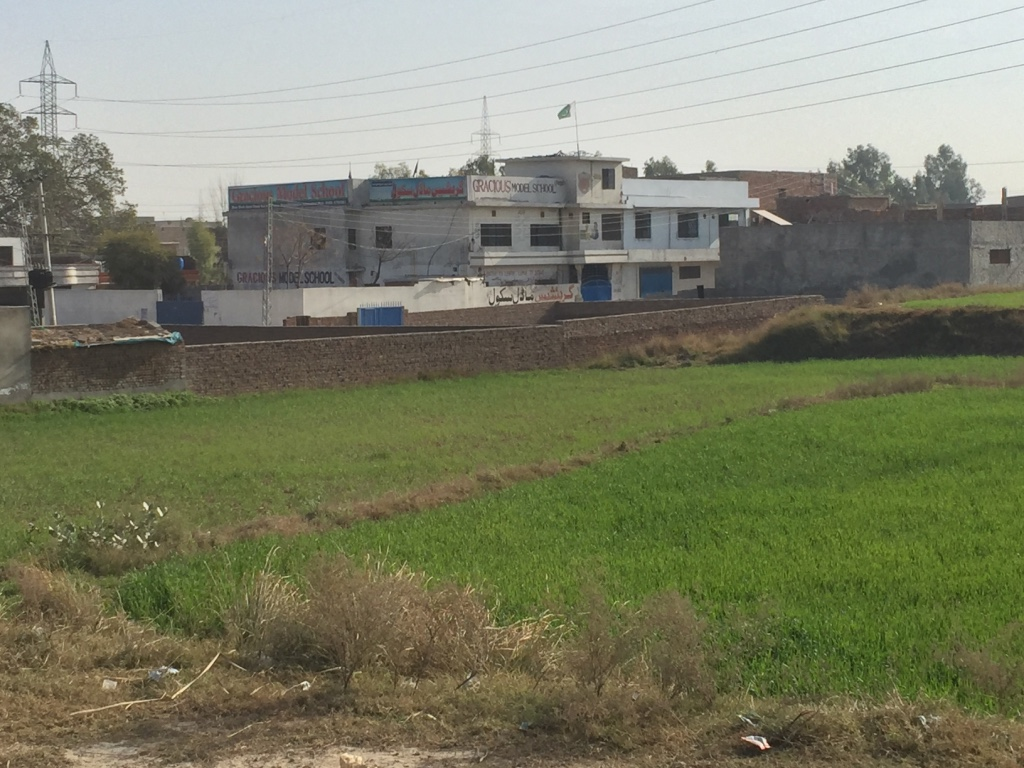
Gracious Model School

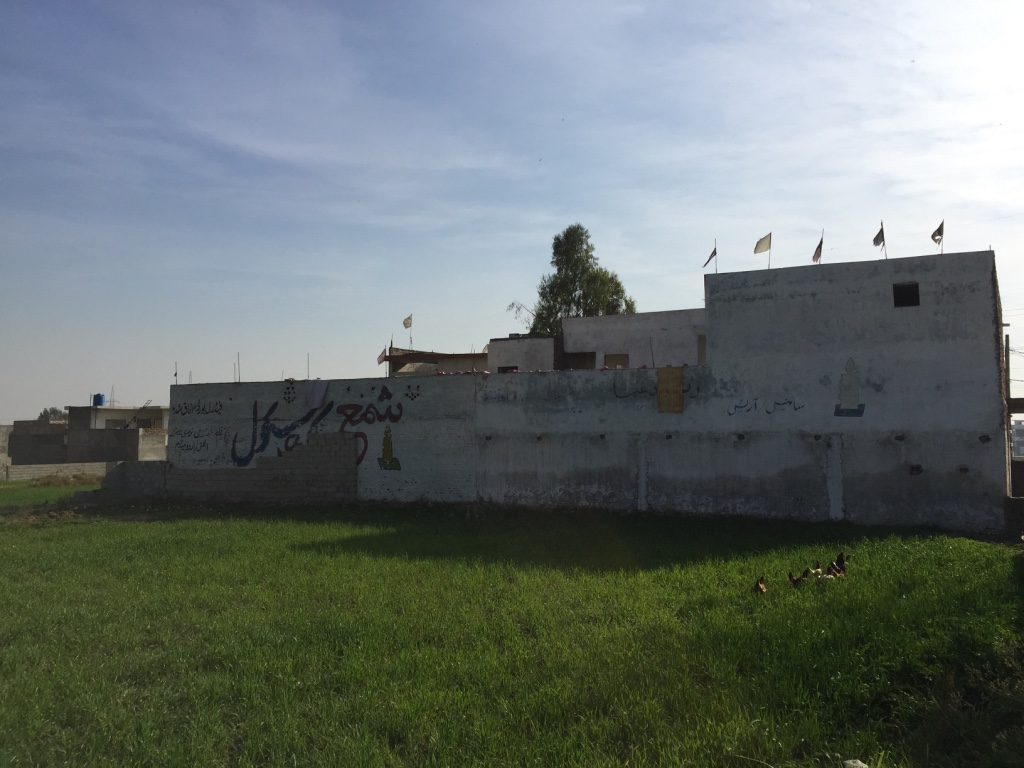
Shama Public School

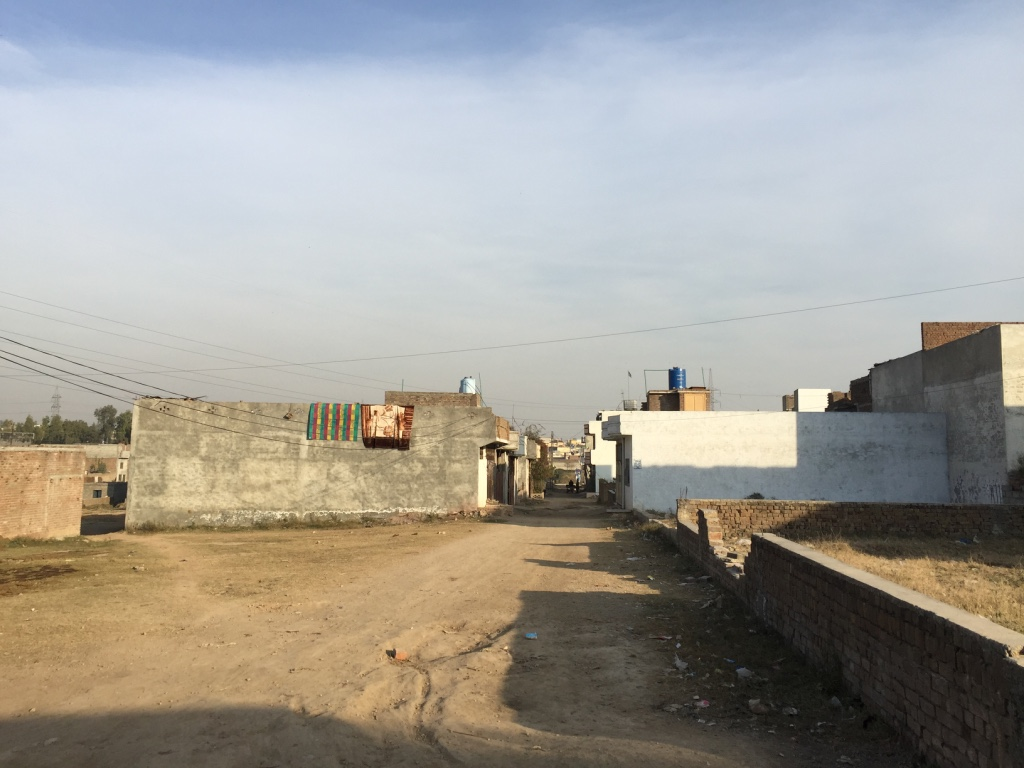
Street No 7

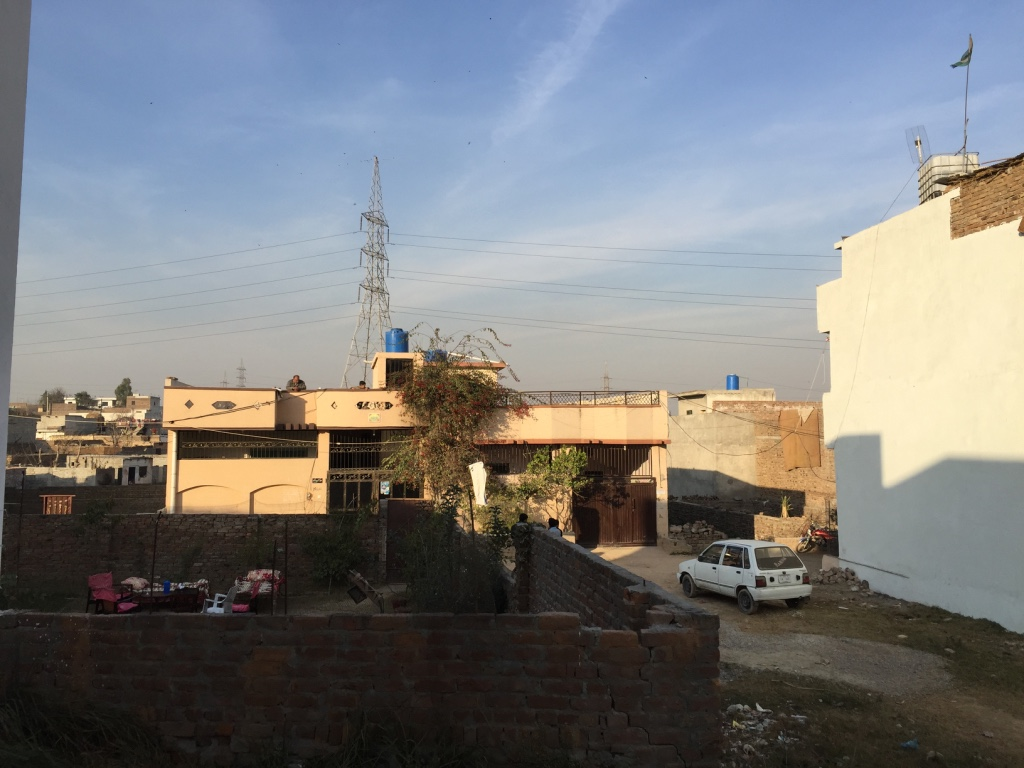
Conference Place
