= K. Abaka-Quansah =

Ghanaian politician

Member of Parliament for Mfantsiman West
- In office 7 January 1993 – 6 January 1997
- President: Jerry John Rawlings
- Parliamentary group: National Democratic Congress

Personal details
- Born: 15 July 1954
- Died: 26 October 2024 (aged 70)
- Education: University of Ghana
- Occupation: Civil Servant

K. Abaka-Quansah is a Ghanaian politician and member of the First Parliament of the Fourth Republic of Ghana representing Mfantsiman West constituency under the membership of the National Democratic Congress (NDC).

== Early life and education ==
Abaka-Quansah was born on 15 July 1954. He attended University of Ghana (UG) where he obtained his Diploma in Statistics. He worked as a Civil Servant before going into parliament.

== Politics ==
He began his political career in 1992 when he became the parliamentary candidate for the National Democratic Congress (NDC) to represent his constituency in the Central Region of Ghana prior to the commencement of the 1992 Ghanaian parliamentary election.

He was sworn into the First Parliament of the Fourth Republic of Ghana on 7 January 1993 after being pronounced winner at the 1992 Ghanaian election held on 29 December 1992.

After serving his four years tenure in office, Abaka-Quansah lost his candidacy to his fellow party comrade Jacob Scherrer Arthur. He defeated Comfort Ohene-Darko of the Convention People's Party (CPP) who polled 2,732 votes which was equivalent to 10.20% of the total valid votes cast, Kenneth Appiah Mends of the National Convention Party (NCP) who polled 0 votes which was equivalent to 0.00% of the total valid votes cast and Isaac Kow Taylor of the New Patriotic Party (NPP) who polled 0 votes which was equivalent to 0.00% of the total valid votes cast at the 1996 Ghanaian general elections. Jacob polled 19,172 votes which was equivalent to 71.40% of the total valid votes cast. He was thereafter elected on 7 January 1997.
