= Abaka =

Abaka may refer to:

- Abaqa Khan (1234–1282), ruler of the Mongol Ilkhanate, based in Persia
- Abacá, a Philippine species of banana
- Edmund Abaka, photographer and historian of Africa
- K. Abaka-Quansah, Ghanaian politician
- Abaka Bay, Haiti, a tourist resort on Île-à-Vache
