= Aquinas Tawiah Quansah =

Ghanaian politician

Hon. Aquinas Tawiah Quansah

Member of the Ghana Parliament for Mfantseman
- In office 7 January 2013 – 6 January 2017
- Preceded by: New constituency
- Succeeded by: Ekow Hayford
- Majority: 2,361

Member of the Ghana Parliament for Mfantseman West
- In office 7 January 2009 – 6 January 2013
- Preceded by: Stephen Asamoah Boateng
- Succeeded by: Constituency changed
- Majority: 3,176

Personal details
- Born: Ghana
- Party: National Democratic Congress

Aquinas Tawiah Quansah (born 4 April 1964) is a Ghanaian politician and a former member of the Parliament of Ghana and deputy Central Regional Minister of Ghana. He was appointed by President John Evan Atta Mills and served till January 2013.

== Early years and education ==
Quansah was born on 4 April 1964 in Saltpond, Central Region. He had his secondary school education at Accra Academy and thereafter attended the Almeda College in Atlanta, USA and graduated with a bachelor's degree in Business Administration.

== Politics ==
Quansah was the former member of parliament for the Mfantseman constituency in the Central Region of Ghana. He contested for the Mfantseman constituency seat in the 2012 General Elections and won. He garnered 31,837 votes, which represented 50.95% of the total votes cast and hence defeated the other contestants including Stephen Asamoah Boateng, Eugene Kwaninaabaka Baiden, Onaventure William Appiah and Veronica Esi Adu-Boateng. However, in 2016, he lost the National Democratic Congress nomination and so did not get the chance to represent the party in the 2016 General Elections. He was the MP for Mfantseman West following the 2008 Ghanaian general election.

== Personal life ==
Quansah is a Christian who fellowships at the Harvest Chapel International. He is married with two children.
