= Axact =

Degree mill

Axact Pvt. Ltd.
- Native name: ایگزیکٹ
- Industry: Software
- Founded: 1997
- Founder: Shoaib Ahmed Shaikh
- Headquarters: Karachi, Pakistan
- Products: IT software, illegitimate academic qualifications
- Owner: Shoaib Ahmed Shaikh
- Website: www.axact.com

Axact (Urdu: ایگزیکٹ) is a Pakistan software company that runs numerous websites selling fraudulent academic degrees for fictional universities. The company used to own the media company BOL Network.

== History ==
Axact was founded by Shoaib Ahmed Shaikh, who serves as its chairman. It is based in Karachi, and has over 2,000 employees. According to Shaikh, the company was founded in 1997 with fewer than 10 employees working in a single room. In 2013 he said Axact was the world's leading IT company and that it had eight broad-business units and products, more than 5,200 employees, and associated globally and as many as 8.3 million customers worldwide. The company website said in 2015 that the company had 10 diverse business units that offer more than 23 products, more than two billion users, and a global presence across 6 continents, 120 countries and 1,300 cities with more than 25,000 employees and associates. Axact's employee figures on its website contradict each other.

According to Securities and Exchange Commission of Pakistan records, the company was registered in June 2006 and had a paid up capital of Rs. 6 million (US$58,860) by 2010. Government records show that it paid an income tax of approximately Rs. 18,90,000 (US$18,543) for the year 2014, and that Shaikh paid a personal income tax of Rs. 26 (US$0.26) for the same year.

In September 2018, Shoaib Shaikh, the owner and CEO was arrested and sentenced to 20 years for the scam along with 22 of his staff members.

== Fake diplomas scandal ==
=== The New York Times investigation ===
On 17 May 2015, The New York Times published an investigative story reporting that Axact ran at least 370 degree and accreditation mill websites. The report alleged that, although the company did sell software, its main business was to sell fraudulent degrees and certifications on a global scale. The Times further reported that the company had around 2,000 employees, some of whom pretended to be American educational officials and worked in shifts to keep the company open 24 hours per day.

=== Company response ===
Axact denied all allegations. The company accused The New York Times of "baseless, substandard reporting", and of sabotaging its expansion into TV and related media with BOL Network, which was scheduled to begin operations soon. It also threatened several news organizations and bloggers reporting on the issue with lawsuits.

Initially, Shoaib denied any association with the fake educational websites besides selling them software. He later claimed that Axact did provide office support and call center services to the websites, but it did not itself "issue any degree or diploma, whether fake or real."

=== Investigations ===
Following the publication of the New York Times article, Pakistan's interior minister Chaudhry Nisar Ali Khan directed the country's Federal Investigation Agency to begin inquiry into whether the company was involved in any illegal business. Following the interior minister's order, a cyber crime team of the FIA raided Axact's offices in Karachi and Islamabad and seized computers, recorded statements of employees, and took into custody 25 employees of the company and 28 employees from Rawalpindi office. The FIA team found and seized several blank degrees as well as fake letterhead of the US State Department. The investigation was transferred from the FIA's cyber crime department to its corporate department.

On 26 May 2015, the Federal Investigation Agency arrested Shoaib Ahmed Shaikh for investigation. As the FBR had received intelligence that BOL had been using illegal equipment, Shoaib was ordered to submit evidence of legitimate procurement. On 5 June 2015, Ayesha Sheikh, Shoaib's wife was indicted on charges of money laundering in connection with Axact and BOL.

The issue was also taken up in the Senate of Pakistan where Chairman of the Senate Raza Rabbani constituted a committee to probe into the issue. Pakistan's tax authorities and the SECP also initiated investigations into the company.

It is alleged that Axact took money from over 215,000 people in 197 countries; that the CEO Shoaib Shaikh is the owner of several shell companies in the US and other Caribbean countries that were used to route the monies into Pakistan; that Shaikh used an alias on documentation linked to these offshore companies; that Shaikh became a citizen of Saint Kitts and Nevis, a small Caribbean island nation that sells passports to rich investors; that Axact sales agents' employees used "threats and false promises" and impersonated government officials to take money from customers generally in the Middle East; and that the company earned at least US$89 million in its final year of operation.

=== Aftermath ===
Axact CEO Shoaib was acquitted of money laundering charges in August 2016.

Shoaib was initially acquitted of all other related criminal charges, but this was reversed when it became clear that the presiding judge had been bribed.

During the investigations, Pakistan Chief Justice called the scam a national shame. In 2018, Shoaib and 22 others were convicted and sentenced to 7 years in prison. The judge also imposed a fine of Rs1.3 million on each of the convicts.

In December 2016, Axact's Assistant Vice President of International Relations Umair Hamid was arrested in the United States. He was charged with wire fraud, conspiracy to commit wire fraud, and aggravated identity theft in a US federal district court for his Axact-related activities. Hamid was found guilty in August 2017 and sentenced to 21 months in prison.

In March 2023, Shoaib was arrested and remanded to custody on a charge of bribing the judge in the 2016 case to secure an acquittal. Shoaib was reported in the 2023 bribery case to have confessed to having completed a transaction worth Rs1,500,000 to the judge in the prior case.

Shoaib has since been acquitted of all charges by the Sindh High Court and the Islamabad High Court.

=== Further revelations ===
Most of Axact's revenues from its fake diploma sales came from the United Arab Emirates, where hundreds of residents used Axact diplomas to obtain high-paying jobs. Axact sold over 200,000 fake degrees in Gulf countries. More recently, Axact employees have impersonated Emirati government officials in an effort to extort "legalisation fees" from unsuspecting fake degree and diploma holders in that country.

The Canadian Broadcasting Corporation's television series Marketplace carried out an investigation into the prevalence of fake academic credentials in September 2017. The documentary focused on Canadians with fake degrees occupying positions such as college instructors and medical doctors. All fraudulent certificates were found to be from Axact.

=== Employee leak ===
In February 2024, the IT podcast Darknet Diaries published excerpts from an interview with a former Axact sales employee in episode 142 ("Axact"), who provided insights into the company's alleged sales strategy. According to the witness, Axact was able to develop a completely new website for non-existent universities within days. Axact created very detailed profiles of its potential victims. For example, passwords were stored in plain text and then used to log into social media accounts. These profiles were then used to personalize the marketing of said fake universities by exploiting psychological weaknesses. The former employee also alleged that Axact invented not only its universities, but also accreditations, including from a US politician. Further, while the employee didn't believe that Axact sold medical degrees, the podcast mentions Canadian broadcaster CBC being able to track down a practitioner with a fake degree from Axact.

== Network of websites ==
A New York Times investigation identified more than 370 websites associated with Axact's alleged fake diploma operations, including 145 sites for fictitious universities, 41 for high schools, 18 for fake accreditation boards, and 121 degree portals. The following is an incomplete list of those websites:

=== Educational websites ===
- Accredited Degrees Pro
- Accredited Online Degrees Now
- Adamsville University
- Advance Online Degrees
- Affordable Accredited Degrees
- Affordable Degrees Pro
- Al Arab University
- Al Khaleej University
- Al Khalifa American University
- Alford High School
- Almeda University
- Alpine University
- American Gulf University
- American Mideast University
- Anchor Point University
- Arab Continental University
- Arab Women University
- Ashbery University
- Ashley University
- Ashwood University
- Bakerville University
- Barkley University
- Bay View University
- Baycity University
- Baytown University
- Beacon Falls High School
- Belford High School
- Belford University
- Belltown University
- Branton University
- Brooklyn Park University
- Brooksville High School
- Brooksville University
- Buffville High School
- California Creek University
- Cambell State University
- Camp Lake University
- Chapel University
- Columbiana University
- Corllins University
- Creek View University
- Crestford University
- Drumount University
- Fast Online University
- Federal High School
- Ford Worth High School
- Fort Jones University
- Foster City High School
- Galewood University
- Gatesville University
- Gene Kranz University
- Gibson University
- Glenford University
- Global Institute of English Language Training and Certification
- Grant Town University
- GreenLake University
- Grendal University
- Hadly University
- Hansford University
- Harvey University
- Headway University
- High School Diploma Experience
- High School Diploma Fast
- High School Diploma Pro
- High School Diploma Professionals
- High School Diploma Profs
- Hill Online Degrees
- Hill University
- James Adam University
- James Harding University
- Jersey High School
- Johnstown University
- Kennedy University
- Kings Lake University
- Kingsbridge University
- Laurus University
- Lorenz High School
- Luther City High School
- Madison Hills University
- Mary Grand High School
- Mayfield University
- McCain High School
- McFord High School
- McFord University
- McGraw Online Degrees
- McGraw University
- McHill High School
- McKinley University
- Midtown University
- Mount Lincoln University
- MUST University
- Nelson Bay University
- Nicholson University
- Nixon University
- Northern Port University
- Northway University
- Oscarmount University
- Olford Walters University
- Online University Profs
- Online University Programs Pro
- Olympia Creek University
- Oxdell University
- Pacific High School
- Panworld High School
- Panworld University
- Paramount California University
- Parkfield University
- Payne Springs University
- Pine Hill University
- Pittsford University
- Port Jefferson University
- Queen City University
- Queens Bay University
- Queensville University
- Ray University
- Redding University
- Riverwood University
- Rochville University
- Roseville Community College
- St. Angelo High School
- Stenford High School
- Thompson University
- Universal Online Degrees
- Victorville High School
- WalesBridge University
- Walford University
- West Coast High School
- Western Advanced Central University
- Western Valley Central University
- Westland University
- Wilburton University
- Wiley University
- Wilford University
- Willington University
- WinFord High School
- Windham University
- Woodbridge University
- Woodfield High School
- Woodfield University
- Woodrow University

=== Accreditation websites ===
- Accreditation Bureau of Online Education and Training
- Arab Accreditation Council
- Association for Accreditation of Business Schools and Programs
- European Accreditation Board for Online Education
- European Accreditation Council for Online Learning
- Global Accreditation Board for Distance Learning
- Global Doctorate Council
- Gulf Accreditation Council
- Gulf Bureau of Higher Education
- Gulf Engineering Council
- International Accreditation Board for Business Studies
- International Accreditation Board for Engineering and Technology Education
- Education International Accreditation Board for Psychology Education
- Education International Accreditation Council for Open Education
- International Accreditation Organization
- International Business Accreditation and Regulatory Commission
- International Medical Science Commission Ghotki.
