= Ebenezer Prince Arhin =

Ghanaian politician (born 1978)

Dr. Ebenezer Prince Arhin is a Ghanaian politician and a member of the National Democratic Congress (NDC). He represents Mfantseman constituency in the Central Region. He represents his constituency in the 9th Parliament of the Fourth Republic of Ghana.

== Early life and education ==
Prince Arhin was born on 10 July 1978, and he hails from Anomabo in the Central Region. He is a product of Aggrey Memorial Senior High School where he received his secondary certificate in 1999. He acquired his Diploma certificate at Kumasi Institute of Tropical Agriculture in 2005. He moved to Southern Virginia University, for a diploma certificate in 2007. He continued in the same university for Bachelor of Art in 2008. Prince Arhin went ahead to do his Master of Art at Bethel University in 2010 and continued to gain Executive Master of Art in 2017 at Ghana Institute of Management and Public Administration. He was again enrolled at IPAG Business School in Paris, France to complete a Doctor of Business Administration in 2023.

== Career ==
Arhin has gained extensive experience in human resource management and operations. While in the United States, he worked in HR and operations with Sears Holdings and Kmart Corporation and also took on the role of auditor and manager at Wyndham Wingate Inn. After relocating to Ghana, he joined Pan African University College as a lecturer and later served as the Deputy Director of Human Resources at Korle Bu Teaching Hospital.

== Political career ==
In the 2024 general elections, Arhin contested the Mfantseman parliamentary seat on the NDC ticket and won with 36,989 votes, defeating incumbent MP Ophelia Mensah Hayford of the New Patriotic Party, who secured 24,099 votes. He is a member of the Health Committee and the Office of Profit Committee in Parliament.

== Committees ==
Arhin is a member of the health committee and also a member of office of profit committee.

== Personal life ==
Arhin is a member of the Church of Jesus Christ of Latter Day Saints

== Philanthropy ==
Dr. Ebenezer Prince Arhin, the KBTH hospital’s Acting Director of Human Resources, told the Public Accounts Committee (PAC) that attempts made over the past two years to recover the funds from the relatives of some deceased staff members have not been too unsuccessful to his expectations. .
