= Ekow Hayford =

Ghanaian politician (1970–2020)

Member of the Ghana Parliament for Mfantseman Constituency
- In office 7 January 2017 – 9 October 2020
- Preceded by: Aquinas Tawia Quansah
- Majority: 726

Personal details
- Born: 24 December 1970 Mankessim, Ghana
- Died: 9 October 2020 (aged 49) Ghana
- Cause of death: Assassination
- Party: New Patriotic Party
- Education: Ghana Institute of Management and Public Administration
- Profession: Politician

Ekow Hayford (24 December 1970 – 9 October 2020) was a Ghanaian politician and member of the Seventh Parliament of the Fourth Republic of Ghana representing the Mfantseman Constituency in the Central Region on the ticket of the New Patriotic Party (NPP). He was killed on 9 October 2020. He was also the chief executive officer of Apam Football Club.

== Early life and education ==
Hayford was born on 24 December 1970 in Mankessim, Central Region of Ghana. He was the only child of his mother, Madam Mena Aba Attah. He held a Bachelor of Business Administration degree from the Methodist University College. He also held a Master of Business Administration (Supply Chain Management) degree from the Ghana Institute of Management and Public Administration (GIMPA).

== Career and politics ==
Hayford's first career was in the Ghana Police Service, in which he served from 1993 to 1998. He rose to the rank of Corporal. He resigned and went into private business. He was the chief executive officer and Manager of MODISA Lodge and MANTRAC Ghana Limited respectively prior to going into politics. In 2015, he was elected by delegates of the New Patriotic Party in Mfantseman to represent the party in the 2016 Ghanaian general election. He won the parliamentary seat with 46.82% of the total vote cast. He was a member the Judiciary Committee and Defence and interior committee in Parliament.

== Personal life ==
Hayford was married with four children and was a member of the Methodist Church. He is reported to have two wives, Ophelia Quansah Hayford and Sarah Quansah Hayford.

== Assassination ==
On 9 October 2020, while returning from a campaign tour, Hayford was gunned down by unknown assassins. This occurred on the Abeadze Dominase – Abeadze Duadzi – Mankessim Road on his return from a campaign trip. He is reported to have been attacked at about 1:00 am Friday morning by six armed highway robbers. Reports indicate that Hayford was incidentally identified as the MP during the robbery and was specifically targeted and shot by the robbers, who blamed him for the problems being faced by the people in the country.

== Subsequent developments ==
His wife Ophelia Hayford was a police officer until the death of her husband. She was nominated by the NPP to replace her husband as the party's candidate for the Mfantseman seat in the 2020 Ghanaian general election. It also emerged that Hayford actually had two wives. The second, Sarah Quansah Hayford, also has two children and was present at the initial funeral rites performed at Mankessim.

== See also ==
- List of MPs elected in the 2016 Ghanaian parliamentary election
