= BOL House =

- Presented by: Waqar Haider
- Country of origin: Pakistan
- No. of episodes: 29

Original release
- Network: BOL Network
- Release: 18 December 2021 – 9 July 2022

BOL House is a of Pakistani youth-based reality show that aired on BOL Network with episodes also available online. The series premiered on 18 December 2021.

Filming of the show takes place at the BOL House in Korangi Creek Cantonment, Karachi which partially serves as BOL Network's headquarters. Like the first series, contestants lived in the house for 30 days from 4 January to 4 February 2022 until four finalists emerged.

== Format ==
The show is a Pakistani adaptation of the Indian reality show Bigg Boss. Hosted by Aamir Liaquat Hussain, it used a mixed format which incorporated open auditions for contestant selection who were then later confined to a Big Brother-style surveillance house. The contestants would leave the house occasionally to perform tasks where performance outcomes along with nominations would result in elimination of one or more housemates.

== Contestants ==
Names, and cities stated are at time of filming.

Name	Hometown	Day entered	Day exited	Result
Bisma Khani	Rawalpindi	1	19	Winner
Haya Khan	Rawalpindi	1	19	Runner-up
Khizar Jehangir	Faisalabad	1	19	3rd Place
Muslih Uddin	Chitral	1	19	4th Place
Neha Ali	Karachi	1	18	Evicted
Sahar Sheikh	Karachi	16	18	Evicted
Farah Ali Shaikh	Karachi	16	18	Evicted
Silvia Khokhar	Karachi	1	17	Evicted
Musawir Lashari	Shikarpur	1	13	Walked
Hafiz Aman	Islamabad	1	9	Evicted
Shehriyar Baloch	Multan	1	9	Disqualified
Sundal Khattak	Peshawar	1	8	Walked
Masood Bukhari	Islamabad	1	7	Evicted
Saba Khan	Karachi	1	4	Disqualified
Nimra Naz	Karachi	1	4	Evicted
Rimsha Khizar Abbas	Karachi	1	4	Evicted
Rumaisa Burnain	Karachi	1	4	Evicted

== Progress history ==
Episode:	14		15	19	20	23			28			Finale	
Vote to:	Task		Evict	Task	Evict	Task		Save	Task		Evict	Task	
Bisma	WIN	SAFE	Rumaisa	LOST	Masood	LOST	Not eligible	Silvia, Jehangir	WIN	SAFE	Silvia	Finalist	Winner (Day 19)
Haya	LOST	WIN	Nimra	LOST	Not eligible	Not eligible	WIN	Silvia, Musawir	WIN	SAFE	Silvia	Finalist	Runner-up (Day 19)
Jehangir	LOST	WIN	Muslih	WIN	Masood	Not eligible	LOST	Not eligible	WIN	SAFE	Silvia	Finalist	Third place (Day 19)
Muslih	LOST	LOST	Rimsha	LOST	Not eligible	LOST	Not eligible	Silvia, Musawir	LOST	WIN	Silvia	Finalist	Fourth place (Day 19)
Neha	LOST	WIN	Rimsha	LOST	Haya	WIN	Not eligible	Silvia, Musawir	LOST	WIN	Silvia	Evicted (Day 18)	
Sahar	Not in House								WIN	SAFE	Silvia	Evicted (Day 18)	
Farah	Not in House								LOST	LOST	Not eligible	Evicted (Day 18)	
Silvia	LOST	LOST	Rimsha	LOST	Aman	Not eligible	LOST	Not eligible	LOST	LOST	Not eligible	Evicted (Day 17)	
Musawir	LOST	LOST	Rumaisa	LOST	Masood	Not eligible	LOST	Not eligible	Walked (Day 13)				
Aman	LOST	WIN	Rumaisa	LOST	Not eligible	Not eligible	LOST	Not eligible	Evicted (Day 9)				
Shehriyar	LOST	WIN	Rimsha	LOST	Haya	LOST	Not eligible	Disqualified (Day 9)					
Sundal	LOST	WIN	Nimra	LOST	Masood	Walked (Day 8)							
Masood	LOST	LOST	Rumaisa	LOST	Not eligible	Evicted (Day 7)							
Saba	LOST	WIN	Nimra	Disqualified (Day 4)									
Nimra	LOST	LOST	Rumaisa	Evicted (Day 4)									
Rimsha	LOST	LOST	Rumaisa	Evicted (Day 4)									
Rumaisa	LOST	LOST	Rimsha	Evicted (Day 4)									
Notes	1												
Walked	none				Sundal	none		Musawir	none				
Disqualified	none		Saba	none			Shehriyar	none					
Evicted	Rumaisa, Rimsha, Nimra			Masood		Aman			Silvia			Farah, Sahar, Neha	

This housemate was immune from eviction
This housemate won the elimination challenge and was declared safe from eviction

=== Notes ===
- ^1 :
