= Mfantseman =

Constituency in the Volta Region of Ghana

- constituency for the Parliament of Ghana
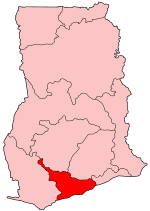
- District: Mfantseman Municipal
- Region: Central Region of Ghana

Current constituency
- Created: 2012
- Party: New Patriotic Party
- MP: Ophelia Hayford

Mfantseman is one of the constituencies represented in the Parliament of Ghana. It elects one Member of Parliament (MP) by the first past the post system of election. Mfantseman is located in the Mfantseman Municipal Assembly of the Central Region of Ghana. It got its new name before the 2012 Ghanaian general election. It was previously known as Mfantseman West Constituency. Concurrently, Mfantseman East Constituency was renamed Ekumfi Constituency.

== Boundaries ==
The constituency is located within the Mfantseman Municipal District of the Central Region of Ghana.

== Members of Parliament ==
First elected	Member	Party	Ref
Created 2012			
2012	Aquinas Tawiah Quansah	National Democratic Congress	
2016	Ekow Hayford	New Patriotic Party	
2020	Ophelia Hayford	New Patriotic Party	

== Elections ==
Ophelia Hayford won the seat in the 2020 general election. It had been vacant prior to the election due to the death of the incumbent MP, Ekow Hayford, who was also her husband. She resigned from the Ghana Police and successfully contested the seat to replace her husband.

2020 Ghanaian general election: Mfantseman
Party	Candidate	Votes	%	±%
New Patriotic Party	Ophelia Hayford	36,021	51.9	+5.08
National Democratic Congress	James Essuon	32,438	46.8	+1.25
Ghana Union Movement	Alijatu Ibrahim	911	1.3	—
Majority		3,583	5.1	—
Turnout				—
Registered electors		91,437		—

Ekow Hayford the NPP MP for Mfantseman was murdered by armed robbers on the Nkusukum Mankessim-Abeadze Duadze Road on his way from a campaign trip for the 2020 Ghanaian general election. As his death was less than three months before the 2020 election, Article 112 (5) of the 1992 Ghanaian Constitution stipulates that there should not be a by-election in the constituency.

2016 Ghanaian general election: Mfantseman
Party	Candidate	Votes	%	±%
New Patriotic Party	Ekow Hayford	26,747	46.82	−0.36
National Democratic Congress	James Essuon	26,021	45.55	−5.4
Progressive People's Party	Kwabena Amuqandoh Okyere	4,043	7.08	+5.73
Convention People's Party	Pius Ebo Dughan	318	0.56	+0.32
Majority		726	1.27	−2.5
Turnout		57,908	66.00	−13.65
Registered electors		88,236		

2012 Ghanaian parliamentary election: Mfantseman
Party	Candidate	Votes	%	±%
National Democratic Congress	Aquinas Tawiah Quansah	31,837	50.95	
New Patriotic Party	Stephen Asamoah - Boateng	29,476	47.18	—
Progressive People's Party	Ernest Kwaminaabaka Baiden	846	1.35	—
Convention People's Party	Bonaventure William Appiah	150	0.24	—
United Front Party	Eugene Akoto Amanfu	103	0.16	—
National Democratic Party	Veronica Esi Adu-boateng	69	0.11	—
Majority		2,361	3.77	
Turnout		63,618	79.65	
Registered electors		79,869		

== See also ==
- List of Ghana Parliament constituencies
