= Shoaib Ahmed Shaikh =

Owner of Axact

- Born: Shoaib Ahmed Shaikh; Karachi, Sindh, Pakistan
- Occupations: CEO and Chairman at Axact, BOL Network
- Years active: 2013-present
- Spouse: Ayesha Shaikh
- Convictions: Multiple counts of fraud involving a worldwide diploma mill organization, and obstruction of investigation authorities
- Criminal charges: Conspiracy of mass fraud of manufacturing and selling fake academic degrees
- Penalty: 7 years in prison along with a ₹1,300,000 fine (Note: Sentenced on four counts, with each prison sentence to be served at the same time: Three years rigorous imprisonment along with a fine of ₹100,000 under Section 419 of the Pakistan Penal Code; Three years rigorous imprisonment along with a fine of ₹200,000 under Sections 420 of the Pakistan Penal Code; Seven years rigorous imprisonment along with a fine of ₹500,000 under Sections 468 of the Pakistan Penal Code; Seven years rigorous imprisonment along with a fine of ₹500,000 under Sections 471 of the Pakistan Penal Code)

Shoaib Ahmed Shaikh, also known as SAS, is a Pakistani businessman and convicted felon. He is the founder of BOL Network. He also founded diploma mill company Axact.

== Career ==
In June 2013, Shoaib Ahmed Sheikh started Pakistani 24-hour news cycle network BOL.

== Fake diplomas scandal and arrest ==
=== The New York Times investigation ===
On 17 May 2015, The New York Times published an investigative story reporting that Axact ran at least 370 degree and accreditation mill websites. The report alleged that, although the company did sell software, its main business was to sell fraudulent degrees and certifications on a global scale. The Times further reported that the company had around 2,000 employees, some of whom pretended to be American educational officials and worked in shifts to keep the company open 24 hours per day.

=== Company response ===
Axact denied all allegations. The company accused The New York Times of "baseless, substandard reporting", and of sabotaging its expansion into TV and related media with BOL Network, which was scheduled to begin operations soon. It also threatened several news organizations and bloggers reporting on the issue with lawsuits.

Initially, Shoaib denied any association with the fake educational websites besides selling them software. He later claimed that Axact did provide office support and call center services to the websites, but it did not itself "issue any degree or diploma, whether fake or real."

=== Investigations ===
Following the publication of the New York Times article, Pakistan's interior minister Chaudhry Nisar Ali Khan directed the country's Federal Investigation Agency to begin inquiry into whether the company was involved in any illegal business. Following the interior minister's order, a cyber crime team of the FIA raided Axact's offices in Karachi and Islamabad and seized computers, recorded statements of employees, and took into custody 25 employees of the company and 28 employees from Rawalpindi office. The FIA team found and seized several blank degrees as well as fake letterhead of the US State Department. The investigation was transferred from the FIA's cyber crime department to its corporate department.

On 26 May 2015, the Federal Investigation Agency arrested Shoaib Ahmed Shaikh for investigation. As the FBR had received intelligence that BOL had been using illegal equipment, Shoaib was ordered to submit evidence of legitimate procurement. On 5 June 2015, Ayesha Sheikh, Shoaib's wife was indicted on charges of money laundering in connection with Axact and BOL.

The issue was also taken up in the Senate of Pakistan where Chairman of the Senate Raza Rabbani constituted a committee to probe into the issue. Pakistan's tax authorities and the SECP also initiated investigations into the company.

It is alleged that Axact took money from over 215,000 people in 197 countries; that the CEO Shoaib Shaikh is the owner of several shell companies in the US and other Caribbean countries that were used to route the monies into Pakistan; that Shaikh used an alias on documentation linked to these offshore companies; that Shaikh became a citizen of Saint Kitts and Nevis, a small Caribbean island nation that sells passports to rich investors; that Axact sales agents' employees used "threats and false promises" and impersonated government officials to take money from customers generally in the Middle East; and that the company earned at least US$89 million in its final year of operation.

=== Aftermath ===
Axact CEO Shoaib was acquitted of money laundering charges in August 2016.

Shoaib was initially acquitted of all other related criminal charges, but this was reversed when it became clear that the presiding judge had been bribed.

During the investigations, Pakistan Chief Justice called the scam a national shame. In 2018, Shoaib and 22 others were convicted and sentenced to 7 years in prison. The judge also imposed a fine of Rs1.3 million on each of the convicts.

In December 2016, Axact's Assistant Vice President of International Relations Umair Hamid was arrested in the United States. He was charged with wire fraud, conspiracy to commit wire fraud, and aggravated identity theft in a US federal district court for his Axact-related activities. Hamid was found guilty in August 2017 and sentenced to 21 months in prison.

In March 2023, Shoaib was arrested and remanded to custody on a charge of bribing the judge in the 2016 case to secure an acquittal. Shoaib was reported in the 2023 bribery case to have confessed to having completed a transaction worth Rs1,500,000 to the judge in the prior case.

Shoaib has since been acquitted of all charges by the Sindh High Court and the Islamabad High Court.

=== Further revelations ===
Most of Axact's revenues from its fake diploma sales came from the United Arab Emirates, where hundreds of residents used Axact diplomas to obtain high-paying jobs. Axact sold over 200,000 fake degrees in Gulf countries. More recently, Axact employees have impersonated Emirati government officials in an effort to extort "legalisation fees" from unsuspecting fake degree and diploma holders in that country.

The Canadian Broadcasting Corporation's television series Marketplace carried out an investigation into the prevalence of fake academic credentials in September 2017. The documentary focused on Canadians with fake degrees occupying positions such as college instructors and medical doctors. All fraudulent certificates were found to be from Axact.

=== Employee leak ===
In February 2024, the IT podcast Darknet Diaries published excerpts from an interview with a former Axact sales employee in episode 142 ("Axact"), who provided insights into the company's alleged sales strategy. According to the witness, Axact was able to develop a completely new website for non-existent universities within days. Axact created very detailed profiles of its potential victims. For example, passwords were stored in plain text and then used to log into social media accounts. These profiles were then used to personalize the marketing of said fake universities by exploiting psychological weaknesses. The former employee also alleged that Axact invented not only its universities, but also accreditations, including from a US politician. Further, while the employee didn't believe that Axact sold medical degrees, the podcast mentions Canadian broadcaster CBC being able to track down a practitioner with a fake degree from Axact.
