= Rochville University =

Fraudulent online diploma supplier

- Motto: Redefine Your Future
- Type: Online diploma mill
- Active: 2001–2012
- Campus: None
- Website: rochvilleuniversity.org

Rochville University was an online diploma mill offering a "Life Experience Degree, and Certificate Program" without coursework or prior transcript evaluation. The State of Texas classified it as an "illegal supplier of educational credentials" whose degrees may not be used in Texas. The Oregon Office of Degree Authorization lists it as "fake". Its operation is believed to be centered in Pakistan, and its diplomas and degree certificates have been mailed from Dubai, United Arab Emirates. Along with many similar enterprises, it is owned by the Karachi based company, Axact, whose main business, according to a New York Times investigation, is "to take the centuries-old scam of selling fake academic degrees and turn it into an Internet-era scheme on a global scale".

The Texas Higher Education Coordinating Board indicated in 2006 that Rochville, Belford University, and the agencies from which they claimed accreditation appeared to be operated by the same individuals. In 2012, a U.S. District Court ordered Belford University, Rochville University's sister operation, shut down and its founder pay $22.7 million in damages.

== Accreditation status ==
Rochville University has claimed to be accredited by various organizations, but none are recognized higher education accreditors. These have included the International Accreditation Agency for Online Universities (IAAOU), the Universal Council for Online Education Accreditation (UCOEA), the Board of Online Universities Accreditation (BOUA), and the World Online Education Accrediting Commission (WOEAC). The Texas Higher Education Coordinating Board reported that Rochville University and the accreditation boards appeared to be operated by the same individuals. According to its website, the BOUA has accredited only one other institution, Ashwood University, which is believed to be Rochville University's sister operation.

Because Rochville University is not accredited by any recognized accreditation bodies in the United States, its degrees and credits are unlikely to be acceptable to employers or academic institutions. Jurisdictions that have restricted or made illegal the use of credentials from unaccredited schools include Oregon, Michigan, Maine, North Dakota, New Jersey, Washington, Nevada, Illinois, Indiana, and Texas. Many other states are also considering restrictions on the use of degrees from unaccredited institutions.

== Criticism and controversy ==
Claims have been made that Rochville University is a fraudulent diploma mill.

According to GetEducated.com, an online learning consumer group, Rochville University operates under various aliases, including affordabledegrees.com.

In 2009, GetEducated.com purchased an online MBA for its mascot, a dog named Chester Ludlow. The news release indicates that $499 and a resume were submitted to Rochville in May and a week later the degree with a packet of corresponding paperwork arrived from Dubai showing that the dog graduated with a 3.19 G.P.A. In addition to the MBA diploma and transcripts, Chester received a "certificate of distinction in finance and a certificate of membership in the student council".

In 2005, investigators for CNN purchased a master's degree in chemistry from Rochville in the name of Abu Salsabil Hassan Omar, presumably an identity of their own creation. Attempts to find a physical presence for Rochville failed. Its website was operated from Sarasota, Florida. The diploma received by the network was mailed from the United Arab Emirates.

There have also been concerns that some people may have used degrees obtained from Rochville and other online universities for fraudulent purposes. On 22 February 2007 Yorkshire police announced plans to re-investigate 700 court cases after the conviction of Gene Morrison, "a fraudster who conned the courts for three decades by posing as a forensic expert." Morrison was convicted of 22 counts involving his claimed education, including four counts of obtaining money by deception, seven counts of attempting to obtain property by deception, eight counts of perverting the course of justice or intending to pervert the course of justice, and three counts of perjury. The court ruled that his BSc degree in forensic science, a master's degree with excellence in forensic investigation and a doctorate in criminology from Rochville University in the United States were gained "not from years of study and learning, but from accessing a website, www.affordabledegrees.com, and paying a fee."

In 2011, firefighters who had purchased degrees from diploma mills to get raises were having their raises revoked. Rochville University was listed as one of the institutions that had provided degrees. In Guam, a Rochville online degree was determined to be inadequate to meet the educational requirements for the position of chief of police.

=== Connection with Belford University ===
The Texas Higher Education Coordinating Board indicated in 2006 that Rochville, Belford University, and the agencies from which they claimed accreditation appeared to be operated by the same people. In August 2012, a U.S. District Court ordered Belford University, Rochville University's sister operation, shut down and its founder, Salem Kureshi, pay $22.7 million in damages. Court documents revealed that Belford University was run by 30-year-old Salem Kureshi from his apartment in Karachi, Pakistan. The court found that Kureshi "operates a sophisticated internet ripoff scheme through various websites, which falsely represent the existence of an accredited and legitimate high school, whose diplomas will be widely accepted by employers, professional associations, other schools, colleges and universities."

== See also ==
- Accreditation mill
- List of unrecognized higher education accreditation organizations
