= Ophelia Hayford =

Ghanaian politician

Hon Ophelia Hayford
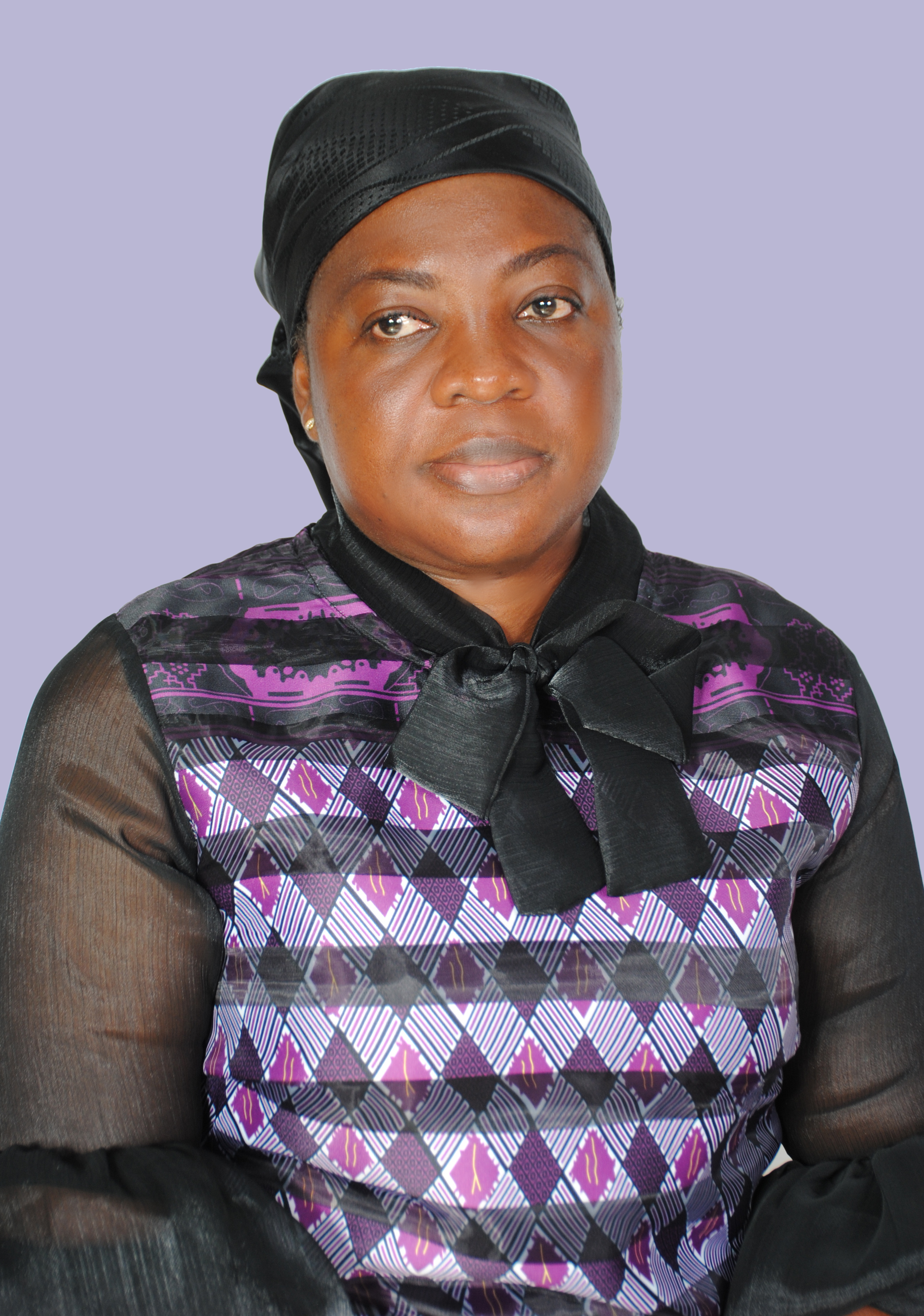

Member of the Ghana Parliament for Mfantsiman Constituency
- In office 7 January 2021 – 6 January 2025
- Preceded by: Ekow Hayford
- Succeeded by: Ebenezer Prince Arhin

Minister for Environment, Science and Technology
- In office 14 February 2024 – 6 January 2025
- President: Nana Akuffo Addo
- Preceded by: Kwaku Afriyie
- Succeeded by: Ibrahim Murtala Muhammed

Personal details
- Born: 29 October 1973 (age 52) Akwapim-Akropong, Ghana
- Party: New Patriotic Party
- Spouse: Ekow Hayford
- Children: 2
- Occupation: Politician
- Profession: Policewoman
- Committees: House Committee; Defence and Interior Committee (Vice chairperson)

Ophelia Mensah Hayford is a Ghanaian Politician. She contested in the 2020 Ghanaian General Election and won the parliamentary seat for the Mfantsiman Constituency.

== Early life and education ==
Hayford was born on 29 October 1973 and hails from Akwapim-Akropong in the Eastern Region of Ghana. She had her Bachelor's degree in Political Science and Linguistics in 2012. She further had her LLB. in Criminal Law; International Human Rights Law and Administrative Law in 2018.

== Career and appointments ==
Ophelia was an Assistant superintendent of Police(ASP). She was the chief Inspector with the Ghana Police Service. Ophelia Hayford also worked with Interpol Unit at the CID Headquarters. Ophelia joined the Ghana Police in 1993 as a recruit. And since then, she has served in the service for 27 years.

== Politics ==
Hayford is a member of the New Patriotic Party. Her late husband, Ekow Hayford was the Member of parliament for Mfantsiman Constituency. After the death of her husband while serving in office, she decided to replace him as the Member of parliament for the Mfantsiman Constituency. As Assistant Superintendent in the Ghana Police Service, she tendered her resignation as required by the 1992 Constitution to enable her contest the elections.

=== 2020 elections ===
In December 2020, she was elected member of Parliament for Mfantsiman Constituency after she competed in the 2020 Ghanaian General Election under the ticket of the New Patriotic Party and won. She polled 36,091 votes which represents 51.83% of the total votes cast. She was elected over James Essuon of the National Democratic Congress (NDC) and Alijatu Ibrahim of the Ghana Union Movement. These obtained 32,379 and 911 votes respectively out of the total valid votes cast. These were equivalent to 46.76%, and 1.31% respectively of total valid votes cast.

=== 2024 elections ===
Hayford lost her seat in the December 2024 election to Ebenezer Prince Arhin of the NDC. She had 23,349 votes while Arhin had 35,832 votes.

=== Committees ===
Hayford is the Vice chairperson for the Defense and Interior Committee and also a member of the House Committee.

== Personal life ==
She is the wife of the late Ekow Hayford. She has two children. She is a Christian.
