= Shaheryar Chishty =

Pakistani businessman

- Born: Karachi, Pakistan
- Occupation: Business executive
- Known for: CEO of Asia Pak Investments; Owner of Daewoo Express; Owner of K-Electric

Shaheryar Chishty is a Pakistani former international banker and businessman who is the owner of Daewoo Express Pakistan and Asia Pak Investments.

== Early life and education ==
Chishty was born in Karachi. His father, Arshad Munir, was a retired rear admiral from Pakistan Navy. He received his early education from Karachi Grammar School. Later, he attended Ohio Wesleyan University, where he studied economics.

== Career ==
Chishty began his career as an associate at KASB Securities. Subsequently, in 1997, he relocated to Hong Kong to pursue a career in investment banking with Salomon Smith Barney, a part of Citigroup. Throughout a significant portion of his career, he dedicated his expertise at Citi, holding various senior roles, notably as Head of Asia Industrials Investment Banking and Head of North Asia Mergers & Acquisitions.

Between 2009 and 2011, Chishty extended his experience at Nomura International in Hong Kong, first assuming the position of Asia Head of Industrials Investment Banking, and later also serving as Global Head of Industrials Investment Banking. Over his 18-year tenure in investment banking, Shaheryar emerged as one of Asia's leading deal makers, advising on completed mergers & acquisitions transactions amounting to over $60 billion and facilitating the raising of over $18 billion in debt and equity capital.

=== K-Electric ===
In 2023, Chishty successfully acquired K-Electric. This acquisition, transacted in the Cayman Islands, saw the transition of ownership from the well-known Abraaj Group to AsiaPak Investments, orchestrated with minimal public attention. Chishty had been closely monitoring K-Electric for over a decade.. The controversies mentioned below through conviction and resolve at Mr. Chishty's end were brought to a resolution. He has on April 15th 2026 been made Chairman Of the Board at the entity: https://www.brecorder.com/news/40416540 & https://www.dawn.com/news/1992002

A legal dispute has emerged between Ernst & Young (EY) and Infrastructure Growth and Capital Fund (IGCF) SPV 21, a Cayman Islands entity controlled by Shaheryar Chishty. The disagreement centers around the recent removal of a director from the board of KES Power Ltd, the parent company of K-Electric (KE).
