= Jacob Scherrer Arthur =

Ghanaian politician

MP for Mfantsiman West constituency
- In office 7 January 2001 – 6 January 2005
- Parliamentary group: National Democratic Congress
- Constituency: Mfantsiman West

MP for Mfantsiman West constituency
- In office 7 January 1997 – 6 January 2001

Personal details
- Occupation: Politician

Scherrer Arthur, alias Jacob, is a Ghanaian politician and a member of the Second and Third Parliament of the Fourth Republic representing the Mfantseman West Constituency in the Central Region of Ghana. He is member of the National Democratic Congress Party.

== Politics ==
Jacob was first elected into Parliament on the ticket of the National Democratic Congress during the December 1996 Ghanaian general election and was a member of Parliament from 7 January 1997 for the Mfantseman West constituency in the Central Region of Ghana.He was also the Central Regional Minister from 1999 to 2000.

== Elections ==
In 1996, he polled 19,172 votes out of the 21,904 valid votes cast representing 71.40% over his opponents Comfort Ohene-Darko a CPP member who polled 2,732 votes, Kenneth Appiah Mends a NCP member who polled 0 vote and Isaac Kow Taylor an NPP member who 0 vote. During the 2000 Ghanaian general election, he won with 16,018 votes which accounted for 40.00% of the total votes cast. He contested with other party representatives which includes; National Patriotic Party (NPP), National Reform Party (NRP), People's National Convention (PNC), and the Convention People's Party (CPP). These people won 38.40%, 2.10%, 0.80% and 21.90% of the total votes cast respectively. The total votes cast was 23,669.

== Career ==
Jacob is a former member of Parliament for the Mfantseman West Constituency in the Central Region of Ghana. He was once Central Regional Minister. during the tenure of his Excellency the late president Jerry John Rawlings.

== Personal life ==
Jacob Scherrer Arthur is a Christian.
