= Daewoo Express =

Pakistani commercial intercity bus company

Daewoo Service Ltd
- Founded: 1998
- Headquarters: Lahore
- Service area: Pakistan
- Service type: Intercity bus service
- Routes: 50+
- Stops: 15
- Destinations: 60
- Hubs: Lahore, Rawalpindi, Karachi, Peshawar, Multan, Sahiwal, Faisalabad, Dera Ismail Khan.
- Stations: 50
- Fleet: 400
- Fuel type: Diesel/petrol
- Operator: Pakistan G.T. Holdings
- Website: daewoo.com.pk

Daewoo Express is a Pakistani inter-city common carrier of passengers by bus serving over 60 destinations. Its headquarters are in Lahore.

== History ==
A timeline of the operations and beginnings of Daewoo Express Ltd:

- December 1997 — incorporated
- April 1998 — beginning of express bus operations
- November 1999 — beginning of city bus operations
- January 2004 — taken over by Sammi Corporation
- 2012 — AsiaPak Investments through Liberty Daharki Power

35 cities on 43 destinations with over 322 buses.

== Services ==
=== Express bus service ===
Daewoo Express Bus Service is the main operation of the company. The company provides long-distance time-efficient bus services to all major cities within Pakistan. With its headquarters in Lahore, the company operates its service from 31 cities in Pakistan, covering more than 40 destinations extending almost to the entire Punjab, Sindh and Khyber Pakhtunkhwa provinces. The service provides direct competition against airlines as well as the rail network. There is also a shuttle/drop off service that runs off the main express buses to allow passengers hassle-free travel to their neighbourhood. Recently, Daewoo shifted its routes From Lahore and Islamabad to Karachi via Motorway M-5.

Daewoo Express bus fleet includes:

- Daewoo BH116
- Daewoo BH120F
- Daewoo BX212
- Volvo Marcopolo B11R
- Hyundai Universe Noble
- Yutong Nova ZK6138HP
- Yutong Charisma ZK6122HL
- Golden Dragon "Daewoo Dragon"
- Golden Dragon Triumph High Decker

=== Cab service ===
Daewoo Pakistan started its cab service in Lahore and Rawalpindi in May 2014, essentially as an affordable cab service to facilitate Daewoo Express bus passengers only. With a fleet of over 200 vehicles, Daewoo Cab now provides point-to-point and inter-city cab service in Lahore, Rawalpindi, Islamabad, Multan, Faisalabad, Peshawar, Abbottabad, Sialkot, Swat, Sukkur, Karachi. During the summer season, it also operates from the northern regions of Pakistan.

== City bus service ==
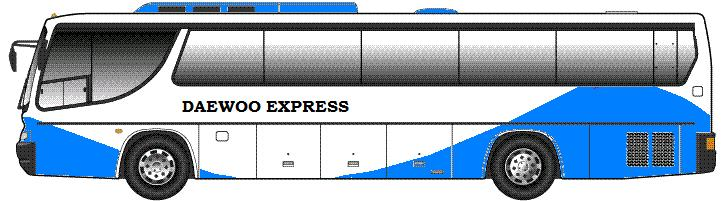
Side view of a typical Daewoo Express bus

The buses were introduced with more advanced and powerful engines with TECHO monitoring systems in 1999. Air conditioning, announcement system and stopping signals were introduced. Since 1998, the city bus service has operated four routes within the city covering all the localities while one suburban route operated for Sheikhupura.

=== Cargo service ===
Daewoo Express's cargo and courier service namely Daewoo Fastex (Official website) is set up adjacent to all terminals and functions 24 hours a day, providing safe and quick dispatch and delivery of cargo consignments to terminals and homes. The cargo volume has over the years been increasing more rapidly than the expansions of the bus passenger operations.

== Areas served ==
=== Khyber Pakhtunkhwa ===
- Peshawar
- Nowshera
- Mardan
- Mingora
- Abbottabad
- Batkhela
- Dera Ismail Khan
- Haripur
- Kohat
- Swat
- Hangu
- Dir
- Parachinar

=== Punjab ===
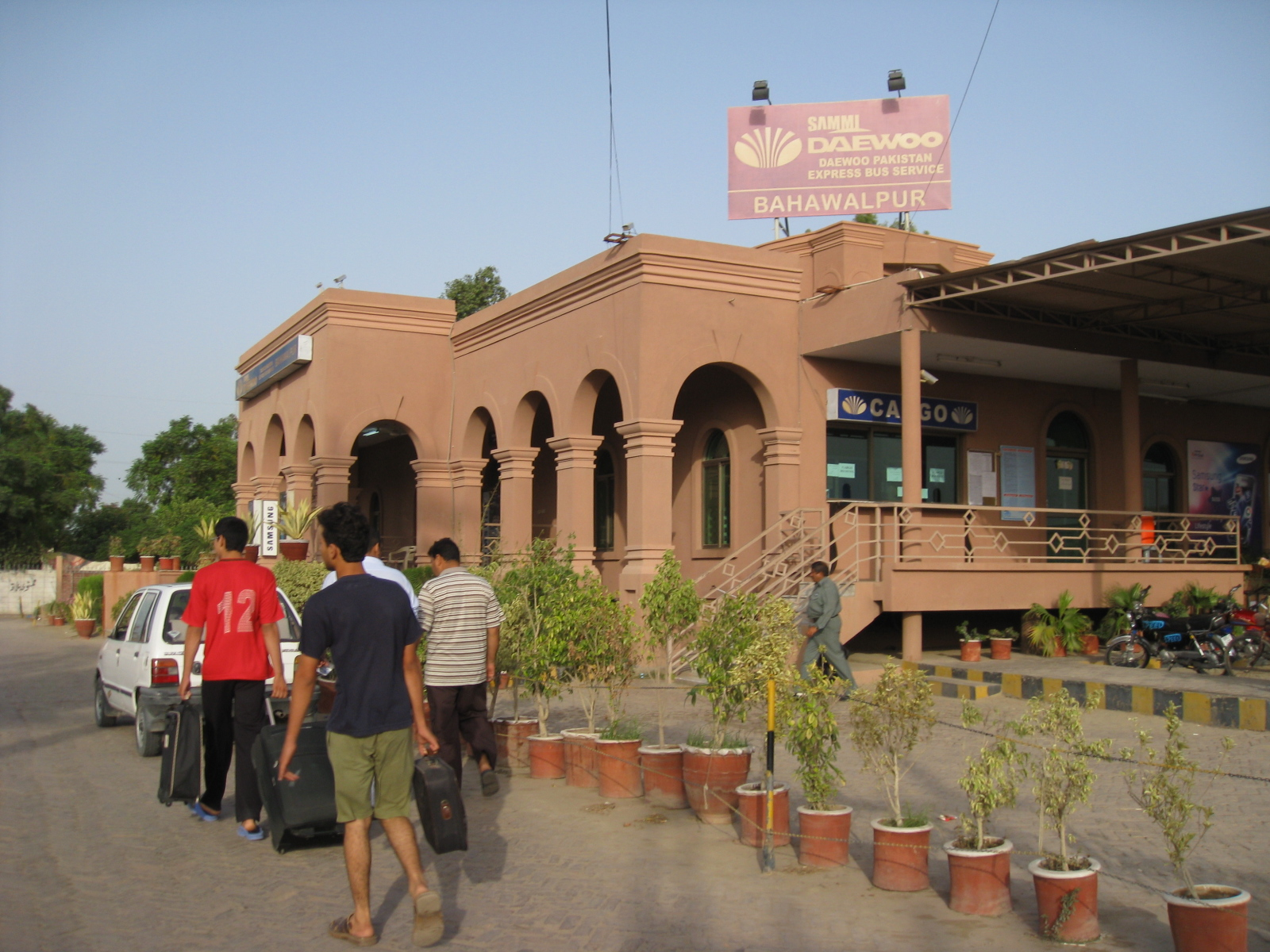
The Daewoo Terminal in the city of Bahawalpur

- Ahmadpur East Tehsil
- Bahawalpur
- Bhakkar
- Bhalwal
- Chashma
- Chichawatni
- D.G.Khan
- Dunyapur Tehsil
- Faisalabad
- Gujranwala
- Gujrat
- Islamabad
- Jehanian
- Jhang
- Jhelum
- Khanewal
- Khanpur
- Lahore
- Lodhran
- Mian Channu
- Mianwali
- Multan
- Murree
- Muzaffargarh
- Okara
- Rahim Yar Khan
- Rawalpindi
- Sadiqabad
- Sahiwal
- Sargodha
- Sialkot
- Talagang

=== Sindh ===
- Daharki
- Hyderabad
- Karachi
- Moro
- Sukkur
- Sakrand

== See also ==
- Transport in Pakistan
