= Mfantseman West (Ghana parliament constituency) =

Ghana parliament constituency

Mfantsiman West
- constituency for the Parliament of Ghana
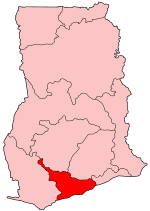
- District: Mfantsiman Municipal District
- Region: Central Region of Ghana

Current constituency
- Created: 1992 (Defunct since 2012)
- Party: National Democratic Congress (NDC).
- MP: Ebenezer Prince Arhin

Ebenezer Prince Arhin is the member of parliament for the constituency. He was elected on the ticket of the National Democratic Congress (NDC) and won a majority of 3,176 votes to become the MP. He succeeded Aquinas Quansah who had represented the constituency in the 4th Republic parliament.

== Members of Parliament ==
First elected	Member	Party
Created 1992
1992	K. Abaka-Quansah	National Democratic Congress
1996	Jacob Scherrer Arthur	National Democratic Congress
2004	Stephen Asamoah Boateng	New Patriotic Party
2008	Aquinas Tawiah Quansah	National Democratic Congress
Defunct 2012

== See also ==
- List of Ghana Parliament constituencies
