= Almeda University =

Diploma mill

- Type: For-profit online university
- Active: 1997–2016
- Colors: Cherry red and white

Almeda University was an unaccredited for-profit online university registered on the Caribbean island of Nevis. It offered illegitimate degrees including online certificate programs, general "Life Experience Degrees", and doctorates in religion and theology. Almeda was accredited by the Council for Distance Education Accreditation, the Interfaith Education Ministries (IEM), and the Association for Online Academic Excellence (AOAEX), none of which were recognized by the United States Department of Education or the Council for Higher Education Accreditation. Almeda University is widely regarded as a diploma mill. It was owned and operated by Pakistani software company Axact.

== History ==
Almeda University was founded in 1997 as a distance learning program. From 2001 to 2016, the school awarded undergraduate degrees as well as masters and doctorate degrees based upon "life experience". Degrees were issued upon payment, with life experience assessments based on the word of the applicant. In addition to its degree programs, Almeda University also offered a wide selection of zero-credit courses intended for professional development.

As of 2012, Almeda only had a mailing address in Boise, Idaho. Upon inspection, Bears' Guide says that it could not locate the physical address of the institution and was informed by reception that Almeda University was a "web only" institution. Richard Smith was Almeda's founding CEO.

== Academics ==
Almeda University offered associate, bachelor's, master's and doctorate degrees using "Prior Learning Assessments” which evaluated a candidate's life experience. It also offered several hundred non-degree technical and business courses and certification preparation programs by e-learning.

== Accreditation and recognition ==
Legally, Almeda University was a corporation registered on the Caribbean island of Nevis. It was listed as an accredited member of Interfaith Education Ministries and the Association for Online Academic Excellence, and claimed accreditation by the Council for Distance Education Accreditation; however, none of these were recognized by the United States Department of Education or the Council for Higher Education Accreditation. On its website, Almeda stated that its sources of accreditation were not recognized by the U.S. Department of Education, with the result that students could not receive U.S. federal loans or assistance under the GI Bill, and that Almeda degrees might not be recognized by academia or employers in some states.

- Connecticut: In October 2001, the Connecticut Department of Higher Education ordered Almeda to cease offering degrees in Connecticut. In 2002, when an investigation showed that Almeda continued to advertise its programs in Connecticut, the Department of Higher Education sent a second cease and desist letter to Almeda and referred the issue to the Connecticut Attorney General for possible legal action.
- Florida: In 2003, the Florida Department of Education entered into an agreement with Almeda requiring the institution to cease operating in the state. While Floridians could still get a degree from the online university, Almeda warned customers that its degrees might be invalid for public employment in Florida.
- Texas: Almeda was listed on the Texas Higher Education Coordinating Board list of "Institutions Whose Degrees are Illegal to Use in Texas."
- Other states: Almeda's website indicated that its degrees also might not be valid for public employment in Illinois, Oregon, New Jersey, North Dakota, Washington and Idaho. The Better Business Bureau additionally advised that residents of these states should potentially "consider the Almeda degree as a novelty item only". In January 2013, the city of Fraser, Michigan, sued Almeda and 99 other "John Doe" defendants alleging violations of the Michigan Authentic Credentials in Education Act. In January 2016, the Michigan Court of Appeals upheld one of these claims (barring the others due to the statute of limitations).

== Reception ==
Almeda's academic standards have been criticized by a variety of education organizations. According to Bears' Guide to Earning Degrees by Distance Learning, Almeda College and University was a web-only university offering degrees based on an assessment of a candidate's "life experience". Bear noted that Almeda stated it was accredited by the Association for Online Academic Excellence, but that association itself was also unrecognized.

In 2011 the U.S. News University Directory, operated by U.S. News & World Report, published an article about online education that favorably mentioned Almeda's master's degree program in psychology. Inside Higher Ed reported in June 2011 that the U.S. News website had removed the posting after being alerted that Almeda was not "recognized as an accredited degree-granting university by the U.S. Department of Education or any mainstream accrediting agency". Website editors stated their commitment to "focus on accredited colleges and universities" and blamed an "editorial oversight" for the site's use of an Almeda press release. In a 2017 CBC Marketplace episode investigating diploma mills, it was discovered that several people from across Canada had purchased degrees from Almeda and then passed them off as accredited degrees.

== Incidents ==
In 2004 a CBS affiliate in Albany, New York, reported that one of their reporters filed an Almeda application for an associate degree on behalf of his dog, citing child care responsibilities and other requisite experience. Almeda initially granted the dog a "life experience" associate degree in childhood development based on the false and erroneous claims. Almeda later proclaimed in public response that the reporter perjured himself by creating a false identity.

In 2006 a Naples, Florida police officer was forced to return a salary increase based on an Almeda degree. Two other Naples police officers were temporarily terminated when an investigation showed that they received diplomas from Almeda. Both officers appealed the ruling, stating they had spoken to department administrators before submitting the credentials needed to verify that they qualified for the incentive program. In October 2006, both officers were reinstated with back pay, but both received 10-day suspensions and were required to take an ethics course.

Similarly, in 2009, eight Washington state troopers who obtained degrees from Almeda had to relinquish educational incentive pay but avoided recrimination as prosecutors could not establish criminal intent. Also in 2009, the Sacramento Bee reported that one or more Sacramento city firefighters have had their raises revoked after obtaining degrees from Almeda.

== See also ==
- List of unaccredited institutions of higher education
- List of unrecognized higher education accreditation organizations
- Diploma mill
- List of animals with fraudulent diplomas
- Axact
