= BOL Network =

Pakistani television network

BOL Network 4K (Pakistan)
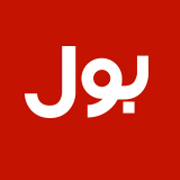
- Native name: بول
- Romanized name: Bol (lit. 'speak')
- Type: Private
- Industry: Media and publishing house
- Founded: 2013; 13 years ago
- Headquarters: Karachi, Pakistan
- Area served: Pakistan
- Key people: Sameer Chishty (chairman)
- Parent: AsiaPak Investments
- Website: bolnetwork.com

BOL Network (Urdu: بول نیٹ ورک) is a Pakistani TV network based in Karachi. The company's head office is located in Karachi and called Bolistan, and it has regional headquarters in Lahore, Peshawar and Islamabad.

It was founded by Shoaib Ahmed Shaikh. In September 2023, Bol Network was acquired by AsiaPak Investments, a private investment firm, for an undisclosed sum, and Sameer Chishty was appointed as the new chairman and chief executive officer (CEO) of Bol Network.

== Programing ==
=== Current Shows ===
- Marham
- BOL Kahani

== History ==
The BOL Network was started by Pakistani businessman Shoaib Ahmed Sheikh in June 2013. After a number of delays, the network was launched on 1 December 2016.

In 2014, BOL Network advertised on more than 20,000 public transport vehicles in Pakistan. The company also announced a television set brand by the name of BG.

In August 2015, ARY Digital HD Network Group announced that they would take over the business and incorporate into their network, but these plans eventually failed.

In September 2022, PEMRA again revoked the network's license due to the channel failing to acquire security clearance.

In September 2023, AsiaPak Investments acquired Bol Network. Sameer Chishty was named the new chief executive officer.

== Axact scandal ==
=== Involvement ===
When the offices of Axact were raided by the authorities, Bol Network provided digital satellite news gathering vehicles to block journalists from accessing to the building. In the course of the investigation, Bol was accused of using illegally imported equipment.

==== Aftermath ====
Many journalists and other senior staff, including the editor-in-chief Kamran Khan, resigned in the course of the scandal.

== List of channels ==
- BOL Entertainment – HD Urdu Entertainment Channel.
- BOL News – HD Urdu News Channel.

== Presidents ==
- Faysal Aziz Khan (2014–)

== See also ==
- List of news channels in Pakistan
- List of 4K channels in Pakistan
