= Toyota Motor Korea =

Japanese car manufacturer in South Korea

Toyota Motor Korea Co., Ltd.
- Type: Subsidiary
- Industry: Automotive
- Founded: March 2000
- Headquarters: Gangnam District, Seoul, South Korea
- Key people: Manabu Konyama (CEO)
- Products: Automobiles
- Parent: Toyota
- Website: www.toyota.co.kr

Toyota Motor Korea Co., Ltd. is the South Korean subsidiary of Japan-based conglomerate Toyota, which specializes in the sales and distribution of Toyota and Lexus automobiles in South Korea.

== History ==
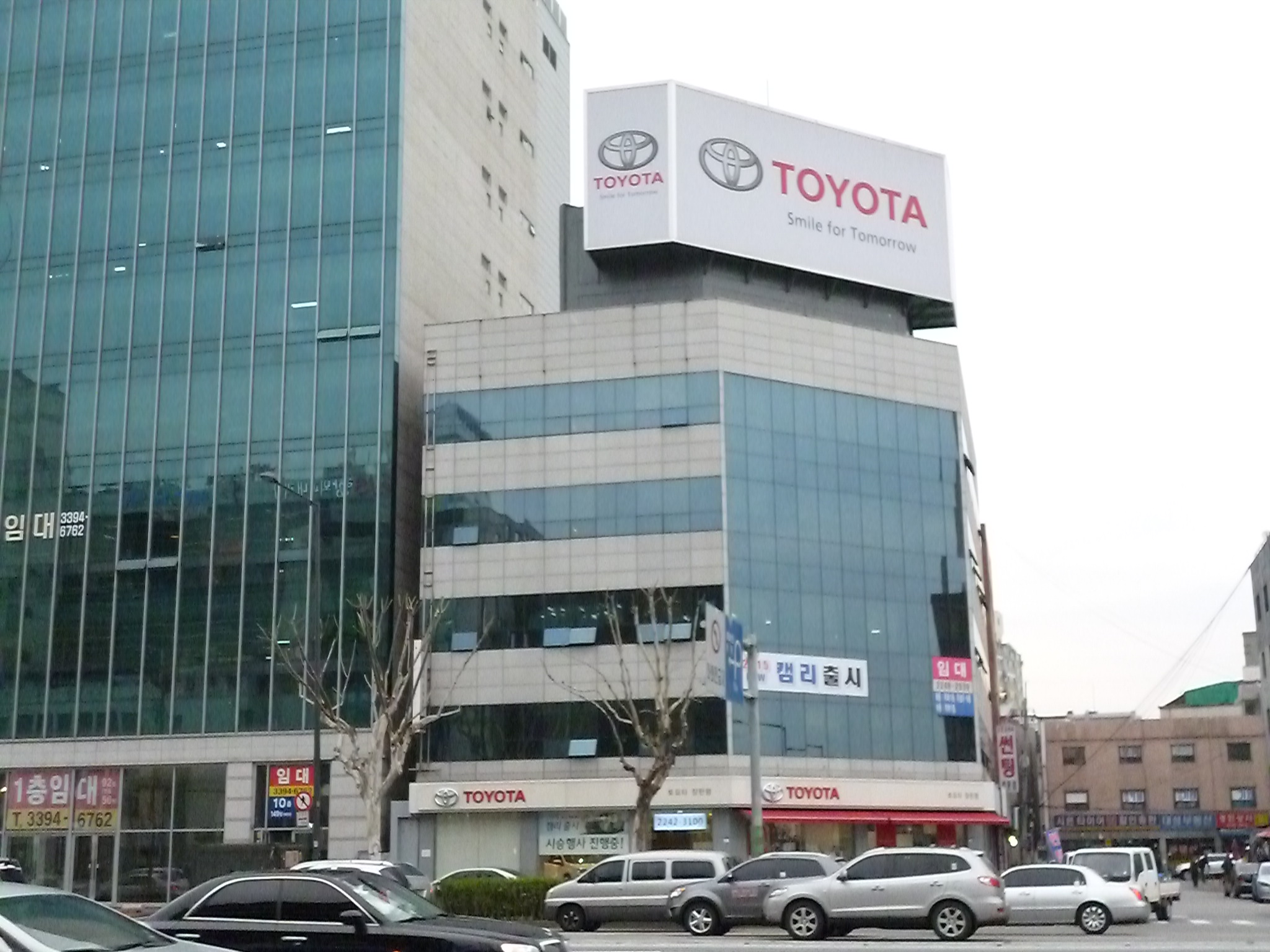
Toyota showroom at Dongdaemun-gu, Seoul.

Toyota's previous involvement in the South Korean auto market began in 1966, when it entered into a joint venture with Shinjin Motors to produce localized versions of cars such as Toyota Corona. The joint venture ended in 1972, due to Toyota's desire to enter the mainland Chinese market—the People's Republic of China at the time having prohibited companies operating in South Korea and Taiwan from operating in mainland China as well. The South Korean government removed a ban that prohibiting Japanese automobiles from being sold in South Korea in 1999.

After establishing a local subsidiary in March 2000, Toyota first launched the Lexus brand in 2001. Through the mid-2000s, Lexus experienced sales successes in South Korea, becoming the top-selling import make in that markets in 2005. Toyota Motor Korea still could not import the Toyota brand due to tariffs and South Korean policy issues. In order to meet the diversifying needs of users in South Korea, where the market for imported cars from Japan such as Nissan, Mitsubishi, and Honda is growing rapidly, Toyota Motor Korea decided to introduce the Toyota brand in addition to Lexus, and opened each showroom on October 20, 2009.

In January 2023, Manabu Konyama was appointed as Toyota Motor Korea CEO, taking over from Nobuyuki Takemura.

== Organization ==
As of February 2022, it has 25 sales offices, including 6 in Seoul.

== Models ==
=== Current models ===
There are 11 Toyota vehicles currently sold in South Korea.

- Toyota Alphard
- Toyota Crown (Only HEV is available)
- Toyota Camry (Only HEV and Gasoline is available)
- Toyota Camry Hybrid
- Toyota GR Supra
- Toyota GR86
- Toyota Highlander (Only HEV is available)
- Toyota Prius
- Toyota Prius Plug-in Hybrid (formerly known as Prius Prime)
- Toyota RAV4 (Only HEV is available)
- Toyota Sienna (Only HEV is available)

=== Discontinued models ===
- Toyota Corolla (2002–2019)
- Toyota Avalon (2000–2022)
- Toyota FJ Cruiser (2007–2014)
- Toyota Venza (2007–2017)
- Toyota Prius V (2011–2019)
- Toyota Prius C (2011–2021)
