= Isuzu Journey =

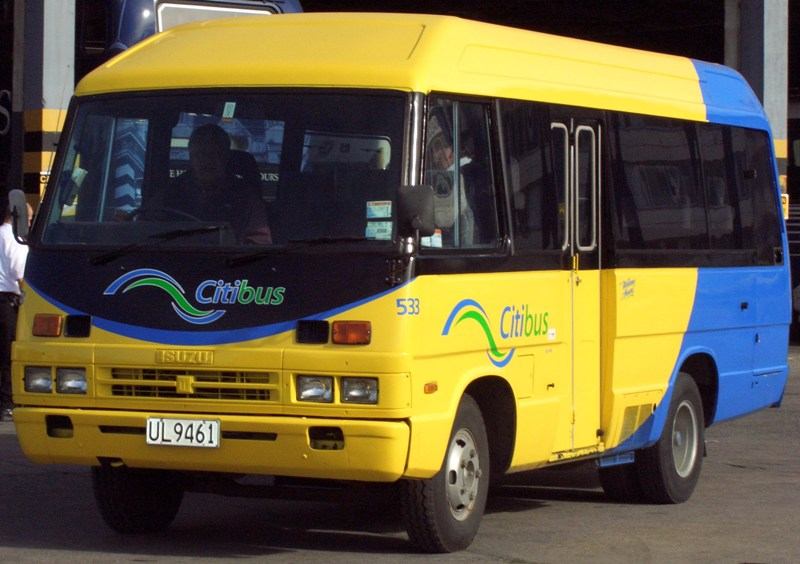

Overview
- Manufacturer: Isuzu
- Also called: Nissan Civilian (1993-2021)
- Production: 1970-2021

Body and chassis
- Class: Minibus
- Body style: Single-decker bus
- Platform: aircraft

Powertrain
- Engine: diesel: 2.8 L 4BA1 I4; 3.0 L 4JJ1 I4; 3.3 L 4BC1 I4; 3.9 L 4BD1 I4; 5.2 L 4HK1 I4
- Transmission: 5-speed manual 4-speed automatic

The Isuzu Journey (kana:いすゞ・ジャーニー) is a minibus produced by the Japanese manufacturer Isuzu from 1970 to 2021. The range was primarily available as a city bus and a tourist coach.

In Japan, the Asia-Pacific region, the Middle East, Africa, and South America, its principal competitors are the Mitsubishi Fuso Rosa, Mazda Parkway, Nissan Civilian, and Toyota Coaster. The current W41 series Journey was based on Civilian.

== History ==
The first use of the "Journey" nameplate was on the 1970 "Journey S". This was an Isuzu Elf 150 truck with a 15-seater bus rear and has a KA5#B chassis code. The Elf had been available as a compact bus since 1964 but was originally still called an Elf. This was replaced in 1981 by the more space efficient and lighter Isuzu Fargo series.

In 1973, the 26-seater Journey M (on an Elf 250-basis) and the longer 29-seat Journey L (Elf 350) were manufactured with diesel engines of 2.8 and 3.6 litres respectively. These engines were later upgraded to more powerful, cleaner units. A much larger (53 seats) rear-engine bus called Journey K appeared in 1972 and was in turn replaced by the Isuzu Erga Mio in 1999. There was also a light duty Journey E, which is still made on the Elf basis but with bodywork supplied by an outside firm.

The Journey L and M were replaced by a rebadged Nissan Civilian in 1993. The Isuzu Journey W40 and W41 are rebadged Nissan Civilian models.

== Model Listing ==
- BE/BL/BM Series (1973-1993)
- K Series (1972-1999)
- W40 Series (1993-1999)
- W41 Series (1999–2021)

== Isuzu Journey-L ==
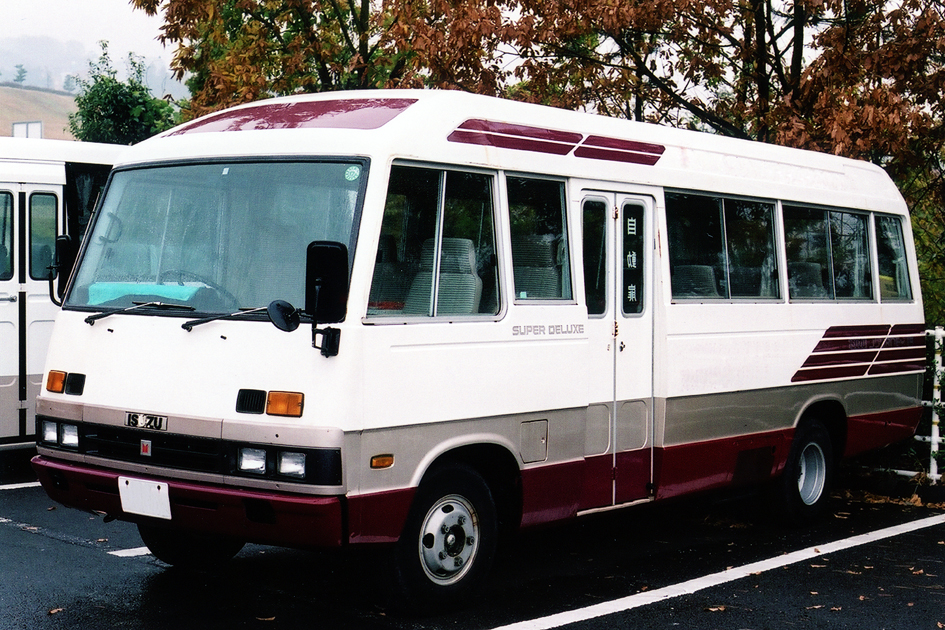
Late second generation Journey L

== Isuzu Journey-J ==
The Isuzu Journey-J is a rebadged Hino Liesse, available between 2003 and 2011.

- PB-RX6J (2004)
- BDG-RX6J (2007)
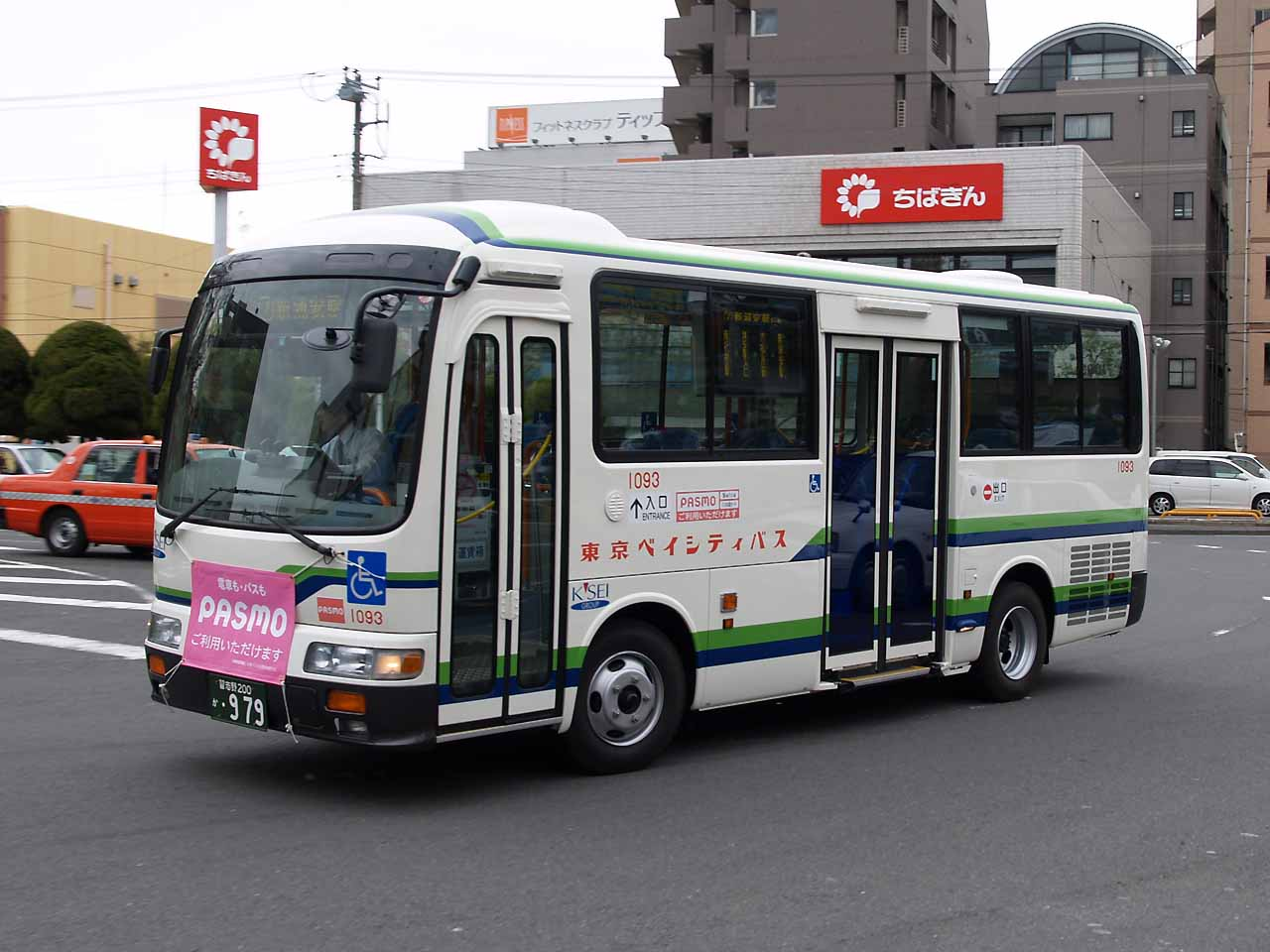
Journey-J BDG-RX6JFBJ

== GMK (Chevrolet) BLD24 ==
GMK (Chevrolet) BLD24

Overview
- Manufacturer: GM Korea
- Production: May 1973 - September 1974
- Assembly: Busanjin, Busan, South Korea

Body and chassis
- Class: Micro Bus
- Layout: Front-engine, rear-wheel-drive
- Related: Isuzu Journey M

Powertrain
- Engine: 2.4 L C240 I4 (diesel)

Dimensions
- Length: 6400 mm
- Width: 2200 mm
- Height: 2400 mm

Chronology
- Predecessor: Shinjin Micro Bus
- Successor: Saehan BL064

GM Korea (Chevrolet) BLD24 was a licence-made Isuzu Journey M series Micro Bus.

External image
- GMK BLD24

GM Korea reentered micro bus division after taking over from Shinjin Motors in May 1973 which it continues to have the capacity of 25 passengers. This model also equip with the Isuzu's 74 metric horsepower C240 4-cylinder diesel engine. Only 121 were made before they discontinued in September 1974.

- (in Korean) 새한 BL
- (in Japanese) いすゞ・ジャーニー: 2代目(1973-1993年)
- (in Korean) 기업연혁: G.M코리아 (Daewoo Bus Company History: GM Korea)
- (in Korean) 연혁: 1970~1980년대 (Daewoo Bus Company History: 1970-1980's) (Marquee picture of GMK BLD24)
- Zyle Daewoo Bus History: 1970S/1980S (Marquee picture of GMK BLD24)
- (in Korean) GMK버스 Chevrolet BLD24, Chevrolet BD50DL 차종에 대하여 [안정섭님께] (GMK (Chevrolet) BLD24 body dimension and its engine output)

== See also ==
Isuzu Journey-K
