= Saehan BL064 =

Saehan (SMC) BL064

Overview
- Manufacturer: Saehan Motors Company
- Production: August, 1977 – September, 1981
- Assembly: Busanjin, Busan, South Korea

Body and chassis
- Class: Micro Bus
- Layout: Front-engine, rear-wheel-drive
- Related: Isuzu Journey M

Powertrain
- Engine: 2.8 L Isuzu 4BA1 I4 (diesel)

Dimensions
- Length: 6400 mm
- Width: 2200 mm
- Height: 2400 mm

Chronology
- Predecessor: GMK (Chevrolet) BLD24

Saehan (SMC) BL064 is a licensed built Isuzu Journey M series.

== Description ==
External image
- Saehan BL064

Saehan Motors reintroduced this micro bus series after a brief absence since taking over from GM Korea. It continues to have the capacity of 25 passengers. However, this bus series received larger Isuzu based 4BA1 engine series from its predecessor. Production of this Micro Bus series ceased after the government enacted the 1981 "Automobile Industry Rationalization Policy", prohibiting Saehan from producing buses. Only 945 units were made during its production run.

== Paint scheme ==
The default color sold by the company was used at the Seoul area starting in 1977; white with orange horizontal stripes. Other colors were also applied as green with midsection of beige up to near front of the rear wheel with twice alternating colors in oblique angle strip at the bus. The remaining midsection part was matched to the body color. By 1980, some of these buses were painted as white divided with marine blue at the top at the windows area and the bottom horizontal.

== See also ==
- Saehan Motor Company (1976~1983)
- Automotive industry in South Korea
- Isuzu Journey
- (in Korean) 새한 BL
