= Shinjin Micro Bus =

Shinjin H-SJ Micro Bus

Overview
- Manufacturer: Shinjin Industrial Company; Shinjin Motor Company, Ltd.; Shinjin Automobile Industry Co., Ltd.
- Production: April, 1962 - 1970
- Assembly: Busanjin, Busan, South Korea

Body and chassis
- Class: Micro Bus

Chronology
- Successor: GMK (Chevrolet) BLD24

Shinjin H-SJ Micro Bus was introduced in 1962 as part of growing company at Shinjin Industrial Company.

== Description ==
External image
- Shinjin H-SJ Micro Bus

This is 25 seat yellow micro bus that started Shinjin's bus industry. The chassis, engine, powertrain and wheels are from old military surplus that they used to assembled. They had old steel drum scrap was shaped into the body as the early production started. In 1965, at the Seoul area they have both blue and cyan horizontal stripes paint scheme which it identified as carpooling that falls into this class. In January 1966, the company name changed to Shinjin Automobile Industry Co., Ltd after they acquired Saenara Motors as the bus production and marquee remains.

== See also ==
- GM Daewoo
- Shinjin Motor (1955~1971)
- Shinjin Motors
