= Shinjin Motors =

South Korean car and bus manufacturer

- Industry: Automotive
- Founded: 1954
- Defunct: 1981
- Fate: Reincorporated
- Headquarters: South Korea
- Products: Automobiles

- Shinjin Motors
- Hangul: 신진자동차
- Hanja: 新進自動車
- RR: Sinjin jadongcha
- MR: Sinjin chadongch'a

Shinjin Motors or Sinjin Motors (Korean: 신진자동차; IPA: [ɕindʑin dʑadoŋtɕʰa]) a now‑defunct South Korean car manufacturer.

A related bus manufacturer called "Shinjin Bus Manufacturing Company" was founded in 1954 as an independent company. It is now a part of Daewoo Bus Corporation.

== History ==
The Shinjin Industrial Company began as a parts producer in 1954, branching into the automotive field in 1958 as a rebuilder for the U.S. Army, with actual assembly commencing in 1962.

The Government of South Korea enacted the "Automotive Industry Promotion Law" in 1962. Under this legislation, the importation of assembled automobiles was outlawed; subsidies were made available to assemblers who were also afforded tariff exemption on the importation of parts. Responsibility for deciding which firms would be authorized to undertake automobile manufacturing was held by the Minister of Trade and Industry, who at the time opted to appoint just one company for each product segment to maximize economies of scale. The minister initially favored the Sammi Corporation for passenger automobiles. Preference was shifted to Saenara Motors after the latter made alleged political contributions to the party recently established by the military government. Consequently, Saenara signed an agreement with Nissan which provided the company with technical assistance and a US$35 million loan to facilitate the construction of a factory in Bupyeong-gu, Incheon. Saenara Motors began importing duty-free Datsun Bluebird (310) semi-knock-down kits from Nissan in November 1962 at a cost of ₩130,000 per unit. The assembled cars were then retailed at ₩250,000—thus producing large profit margins that allowed Saenara to provide political donations to the government. Due to a shortage of foreign currency, the junta later forbade the firm from importing further kits; this led to the cessation of manufacture in May 1963, having built only 2,773 cars. Saenara collapsed that July, thus resulting in its ownership transfer under joint management by the ministry and Hanil Bank.

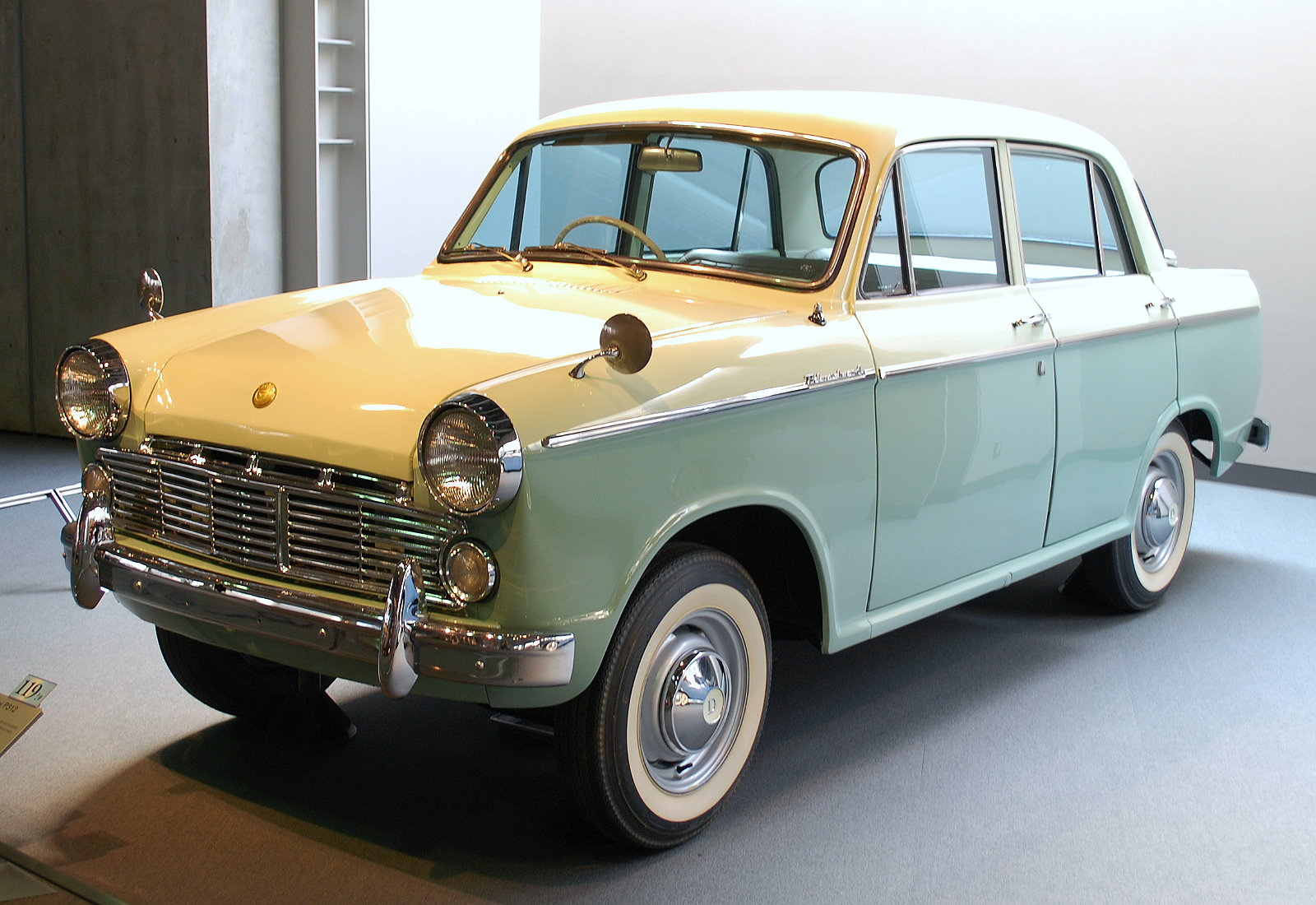
1963–1966 Shinjin Shinsungho, based on the Datsun Bluebird (310) and formerly sold by Saenara Motors (1962–1963)

In November 1963, Shinjin released the Shinsungho (alternatively spelled Sinsungho)—an exact copy of the Saenara Bluebird except they were fitted with Jeep engines. Shinsungho models continued until 1966, by which time just 322 Shinsungho cars had been produced.

The ministry unveiled a new automotive plan in August 1964 that envisaged a parts and components sector that revolved around a sole automobile assembler. The government reassigned Shinjin as the authorized automobile producer in May 1964 via a new Shinjin Automobile Company division, with the manufacturer taking control of the Saenara plant in November 1965. The selection of the Shinjin bid was again attributed to sizeable contribution to the political party in power. However, according to Odaka (1983), the government's selection appears to have made provision for the technological capability of Shinjin.

Initially, Shinjin formed a technical venture with Mitsubishi Motors, assembling 100 units of the 1500 cc Mitsubishi Colt model with imported and semi-knock-down parts. This was denounced by other firms as it acted contrary to the government’s objective of localizing the parts industry, and as such Shinjin terminated the deal a year later.

A new foreign venture was then established with Toyota in January 1966 and approved by the ministry on 2 February 1966. This resulted in models such as the Toyota Corona from May 1966 being produced and achieving 21 percent local parts content. Corona manufacture allowed the company to increase its 1965 asset base of ₩300 million to ₩3.2 billion in 1968. The profitability experienced by Shinjin became a source of contention with other industrial groups emerging as lobbyists to convince the government to grant further licensing, thus ending the monopoly. In December 1966, the government decided to terminate the monopoly held by Shinjin by investigating other firms to commence passenger car production. In 1967, Hyundai was approved, with Asia Motors following suit a year later, and Kia Motors in 1971. The cessation of this monopoly, in conjunction with technological relationships with foreign corporations, substantially uplifted the total automotive industry output in South Korea to 33,000 units in 1969, up from 7,400 in 1966. However, as production numbers started to decline, the government implemented new measures to promote growth. This included permission for the transfer of Toyota's shares in Shinjin to General Motors in 1972. This ownership transfer was necessitated due to Toyota's wish to move into the Chinese market—the People's Republic of China prohibited companies operating in South Korea and Taiwan from operating in mainland China as well. The new partnership sought with General Motors, resulted in the 50-50 General Motors Korea (GMK) joint venture. Due to financial difficulties, Shinjin sold its stake of GMK in November 1976 to the Korea Development Bank (KBD), and GMK was retitled Saehan Motors. The KBD later sold this equity stake onto the Daewoo Group in 1978.

In April 1974, a separate 50-50 alliance was set up between Shinjin and the American Motor Company (AMC), known as Shinjin Jeep Motors. The following month, Shinjin entered into a technical partnership contract with AMC, and in October 1974, production of hard and softtop Jeeps commenced. In March 1979 AMC relinquished its stake in the firm as it became a domestic corporation and its name was subsequently changed to Shinjin Motors. The corporation was renamed once again in February 1981 to Keohwa, which was taken over by Dong-A Motors in December 1984. This acquisition resulted in the "Dong-A" nameplate being applied to all South Korean manufactured Jeeps from 1985. When the SsangYong Group chaebol purchased Dong-A in September 1986, the firm was subsequently renamed "SsangYong Motor Company" in March 1988. At the same time, all "Jeeps" produced by the former Keohwa under the "Dong-A" trademark were re-branded "SsangYong".

== Shinjin models ==
=== Automobiles ===
- Shinjin Corona — the first model of the brand and launched in May 1966. The Corona is a mid-size sedan with a 1,490 cc four-cylinder, two-barrel carburetor engine producing 82 PS (60 kW) and 122 N⋅m (12.4 kg⋅m). The suspension was independent coil suspension with hydraulic shock absorbers with front and rear drum brakes. It was the most popular car of its time in South Korea, selling a total of 44,248 units. The model went through a model change in 1970 with optional 1600 cc engine producing 90 PS (66 kW). The Corona was discontinued in 1972. Very few Shinjin Coronas remain today.
- Shinjin Publica — introduced in 1967, powered by the air cooled 790 cc two-cylinder, horizontally opposed engine good for 30 kW (40 hp). Shinjin Motors believed that there would be a private automobile boom in South Korea and many people would look forward to purchasing a small and economical car. The Publica is known as the "Red Car"or "Little Car" by the public and became very famous. However, sales were not successful with only 2,005 cars sold until 1971. The model offered three body options: two-door, wagon, and pickup versions. Only three cars survive today, with one designated in 2008 as registered heritage property of South Korea.
- Shinjin Crown — in 1967 the manufacturer established this model as its first luxury car, using a 1,453 cc inline-four engine producing 45 kW (61 hp) and a maximum speed of 141 km/h (88 mph). The model was mainly purchased by large industry owners, government agencies, and the highway patrol police. Between 1969 and 1970 the model went through three facelifts. The 1969 Crown Deluxe received a minor face lift, new trim and a new 1,988 cc engine producing 78 kW (105 hp) and with a top speed of 171 km/h (106 mph). In 1970, Shinjin released the Shinjin New Crown in a second attempt to enter this luxury segment and manage to be very successful selling 3,839 cars, double that of Hyundai's Ford 20M. However, after Toyota left Shinjin Motor Company, they were not able to sell more vehicles and was bought by General Motors.
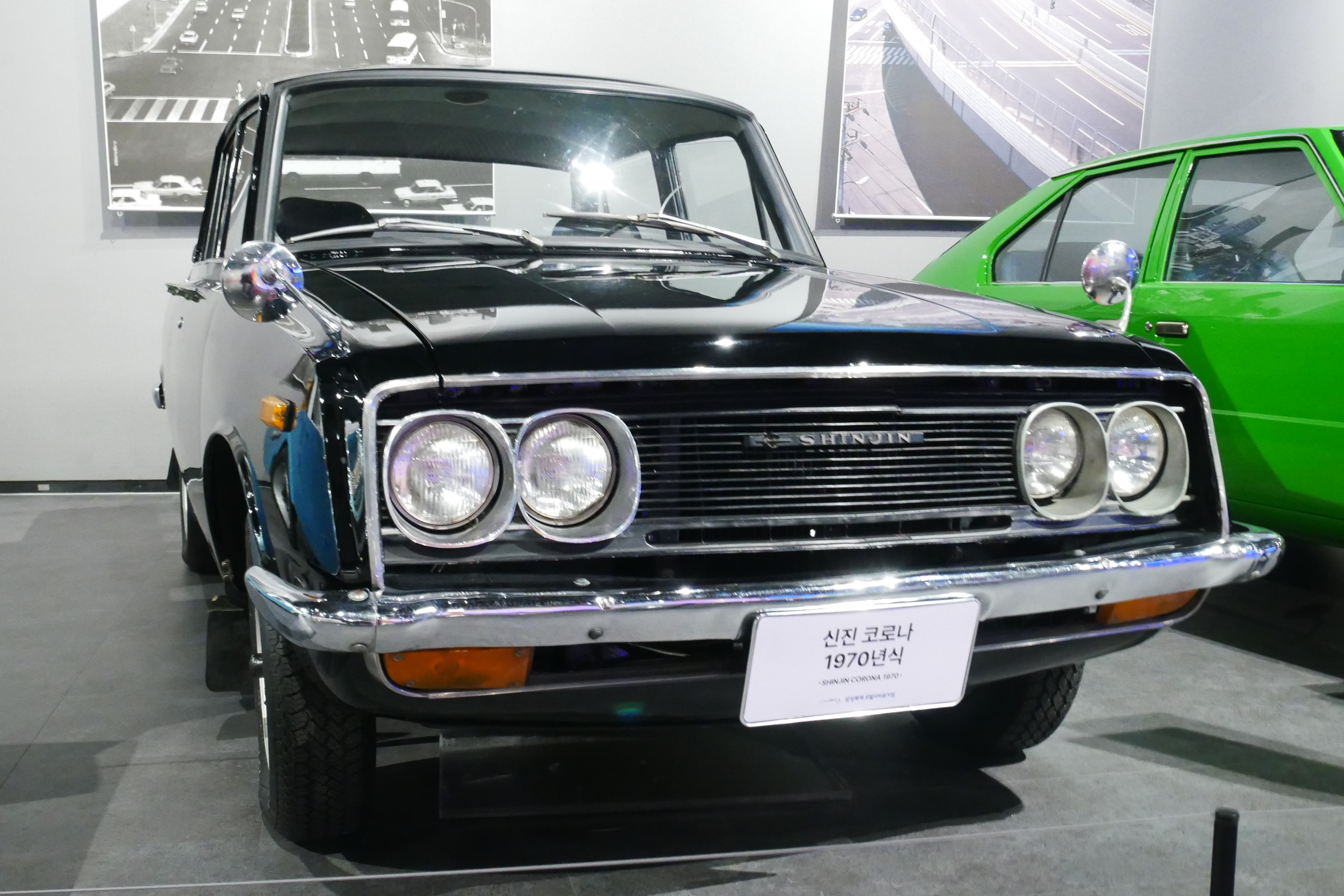
신진 코로나 1500
Shinjin Corona 1500
1966–1972

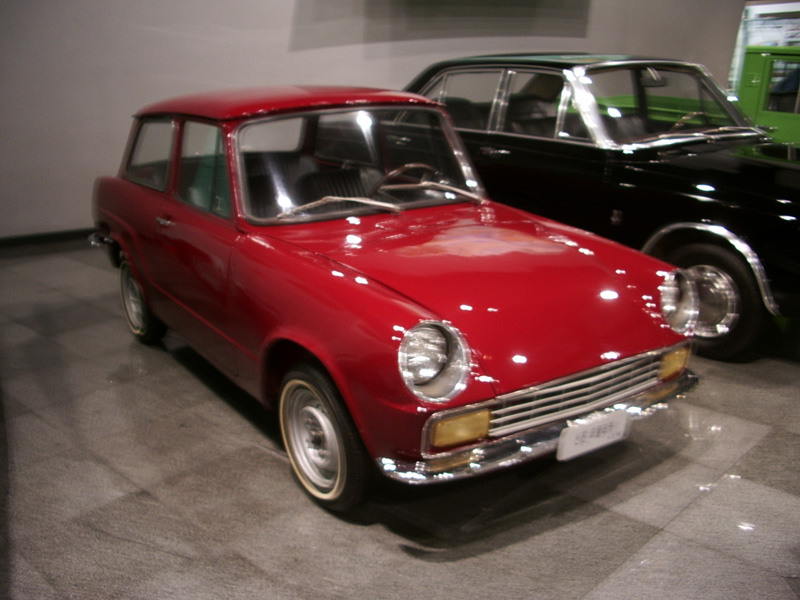
신진 퍼블리카
Shinjin Publica
1967–1971

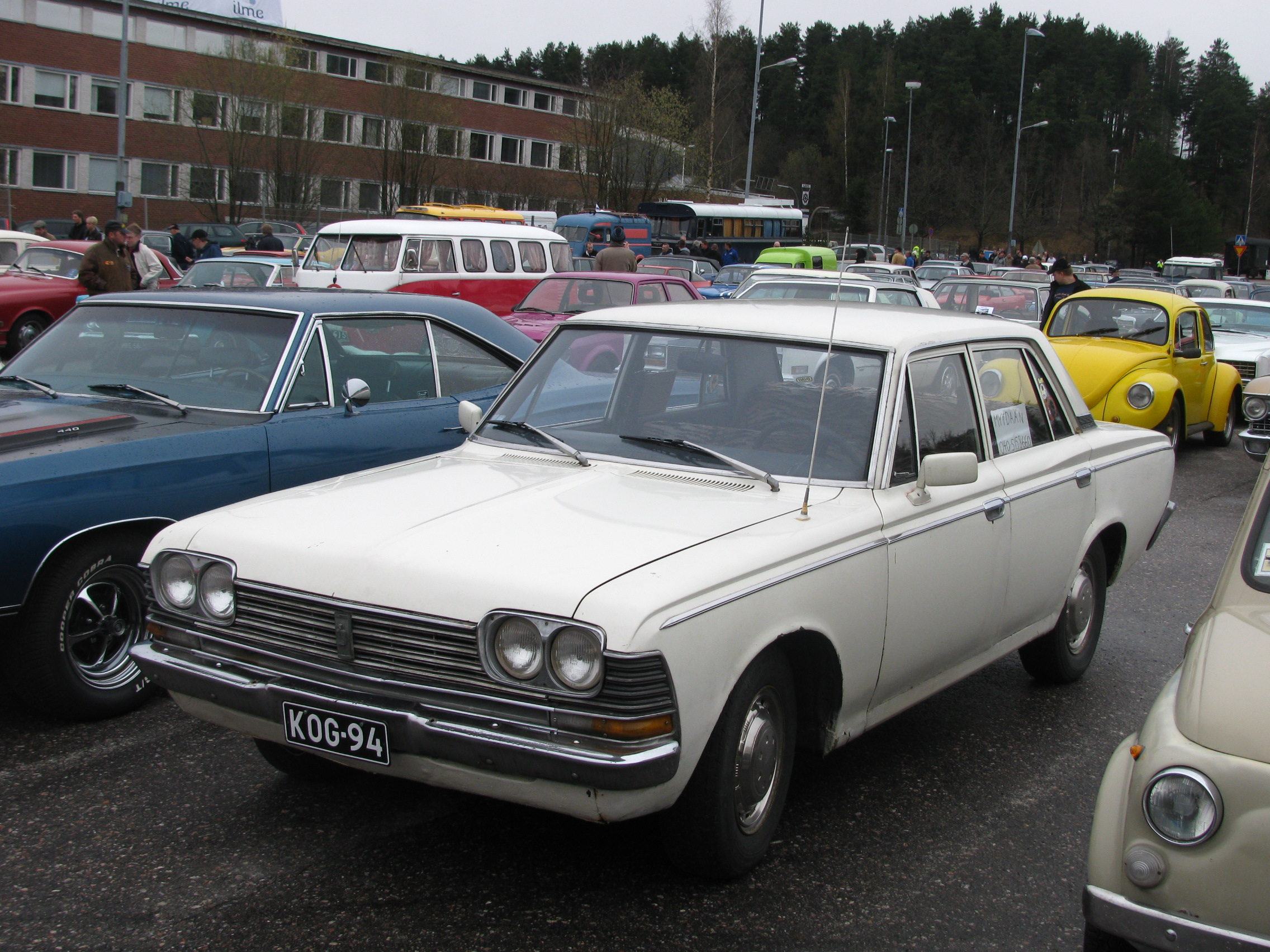
신진 크라운
Shinjin Crown
1967–1968

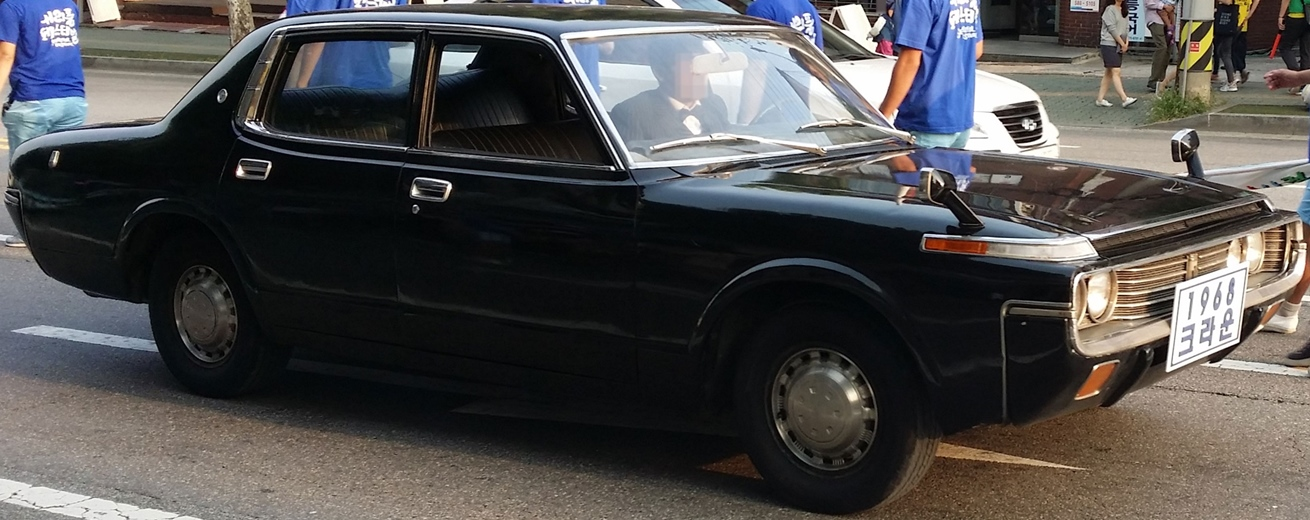
신진 뉴 크라운
Shinjin New Crown
1971–1972

=== Buses ===
- Microbus — The body of the microbus was built and assembled by Shinjin Motor Company, however, because they were unable to manufacture the powertrain and chassis, they were taken from Dodge M37. Since the bus is very first South Korean built vehicle, many bus companies purchased them, thus making the Microbus the first successful bus built by Shinjin.
- FB100LK — After the success of the Microbus, Shinjin turned to building large buses for public transit in the city of Seoul which were dominated by Hadonghan Motor Company. Instead of using power source from military vehicles, Shinjin issued the Isuzu Motors BR20 bus in both front- and rear-engined configurations. The FB100LK soon became one of the best sellers for the company.
- DB102LC — Shinjin also built buses using Toyota's powertrain and chassis. The bus is the longer version of the FB100LK, but used for the same purpose. The bus is based on Toyota DB100K, although front design was changed and many components were built by Shinjin themselves. Only the front-engine setup was available. After Toyota ceased its relations with Shinjin, this bus was discontinued.
- RC420TP — After founding of the Gyeongbu Expressway, Shinjin license built the Hino RC300P for the new express bus market. It was mounted with Hino DK20-T engine and had air suspension. However, it was built only for one year giving a total of just 67 units. The bus is recognized in South Korea as one of the first express buses, although the first express bus was Hyundai's Ford R226 Turbo.

=== Trucks ===
- Land Cruiser Pickup — The Land Cruiser Pickup was first four-wheel drive pickup and mainly purchased by construction workers and private owners. The pickup was very successful and replaced old US Army trucks sold to civilians after war. The pickup was sold until 1972. Only one example survives today owned by private owner.
- Ace — Shinjin sold a light truck that was a licensed Toyota ToyoAce. It was popular choice for many transport companies and remained very popular until its demise in 1972.
- Cargo Truck — Shinjin licensed built Toyota Truck in 1967 to sell it in truck market. It is nicknamed "Toyota Bonnet Truck" because the engine is mounted in front of the cab with the truck bonnet stretched out. It was also sold as a ladder truck for fire department. It was discontinued in 1970.
- Dump Truck — Shinjin license built a Hino truck in 1968 to sell to construction companies and since there wasn't a name for this truck, people nicknamed it the "Hino Bonnet Truck". The truck was not a sales success and was discontinued in 1971.
- 6.5t Cargo Truck — The truck was licensed built, based on Hino TC cab-over truck. The truck was first cab-over truck in South Korea and became popular. The truck was targeted for transportation companies that mainly uses the expressway. The truck was discontinued in 1972.

== GMK models ==
Shinjin changed its name to GMK (General Motors Korea) after its 50-50 joint venture with GM resulting in ₩18 billion in capital. From now on, vehicle assembly of GM vehicles occurred, with engines from the German subsidiary of GM, Opel. These GM models were popular in South Korea and continued manufactured with to Saehan Motors and Daewoo Motors.

=== Automobiles ===
- Chevrolet 1700 — introduced in South Korea in August 1972 based on the Holden Torana (LJ) from Australia. The car had 1,698 cc CHI engine producing 59 kW (79 hp) and 127 N⋅m (13.0 kg⋅m). Compared to its rivals, the 1700 had more power and the car was reliable. However, it also had a low ride height and high fuel consumption compared to rivals. This was problematic as the car was built during the 1973 oil crisis. This also effected the taxi industry which consumed 60 percent of Chevrolet 1700 sales. GMK soon fitted a fuel saving system on the Chevrolet 1700, but the sales remained low and the model was discontinued in 1975 after 8,105 units were sold. Only one Chevrolet 1700 survives today, a former taxi. There was also a wagon version of Chevrolet 1700 called Caravan.
- Record 1900 — introduced in 1973 and based on the Opel Rekord D. The car was the flagship luxury sedan for GMK, fitted with a 1,897 cc CHI engine producing 76 kW (102 hp) and 159 N⋅m (16.2 kg⋅m). In 1975, GMK issued minor trim changes for the Record 1900 and the name changed to Record Royal. The car had no exterior changes, but had subtle interior changes. The model continued to Saehan Motor and Daewoo Motor.
- GMK Camina — the successor of the Chevrolet 1700 based on Holden Torana and introduced in March 1976. The car shared the same chassis with the Chevrolet 1700 but had a downsized 1,495 cc engine producing 49 kW (66 hp) and 110 N⋅m (11.2 kg⋅m). GMK also attempted to make car more luxurious adding console box, new door trims and adjustable bucket seats. However, the smaller engine was underpowered and couldn't balance out the car's weight very well. The Camina was discontinued in January 1978 with only 922 cars sold.
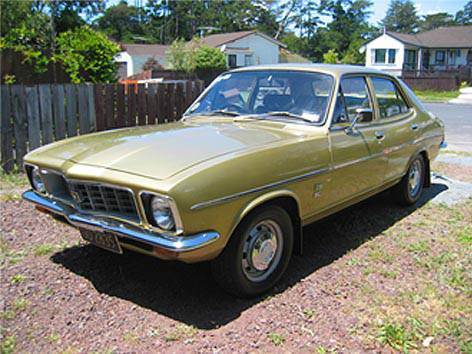
시보레 1700
Chevrolet 1700
1972–1978

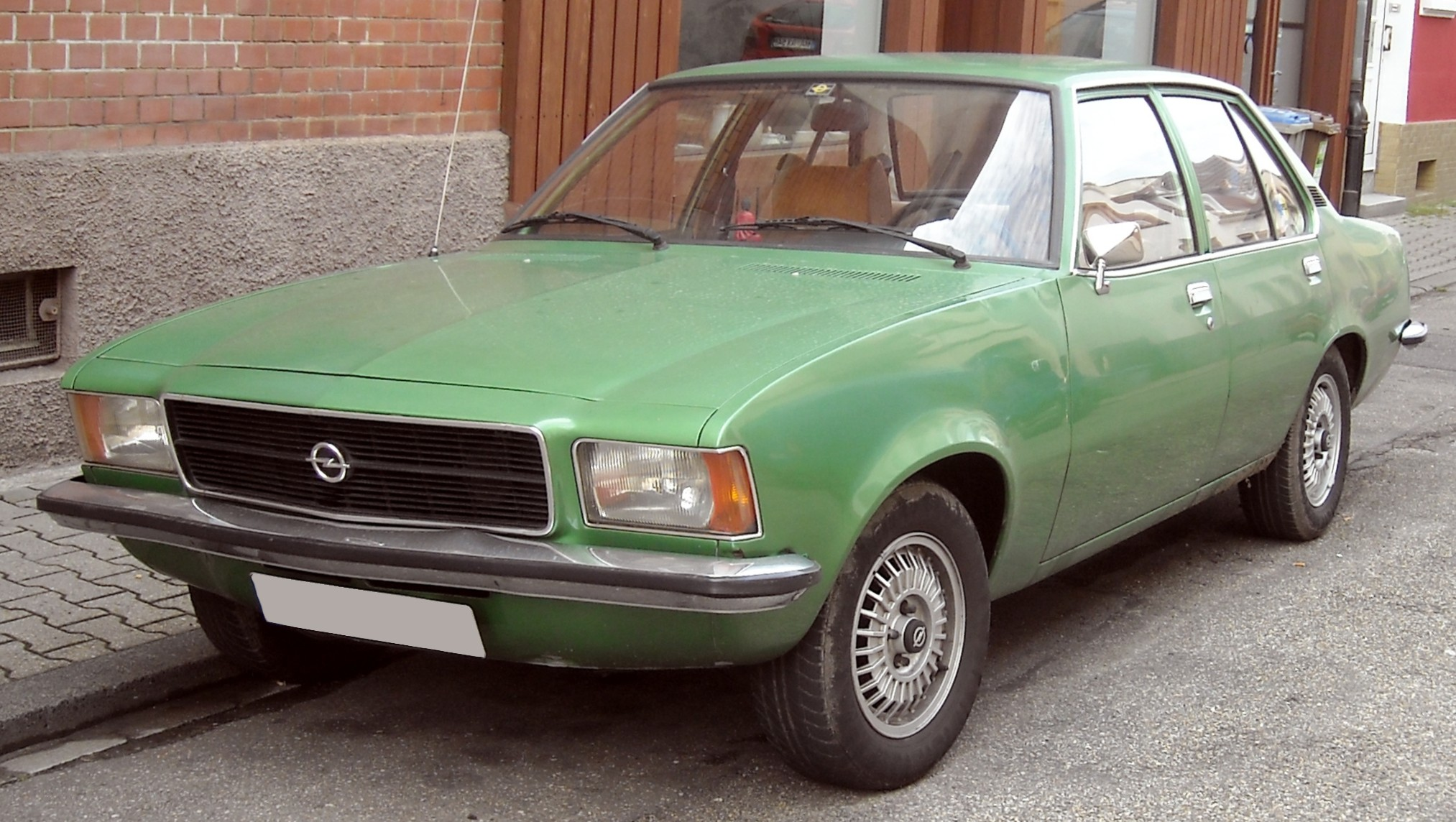
GM코리아 레코드 1900
GM Korea Rekord
1972–1978

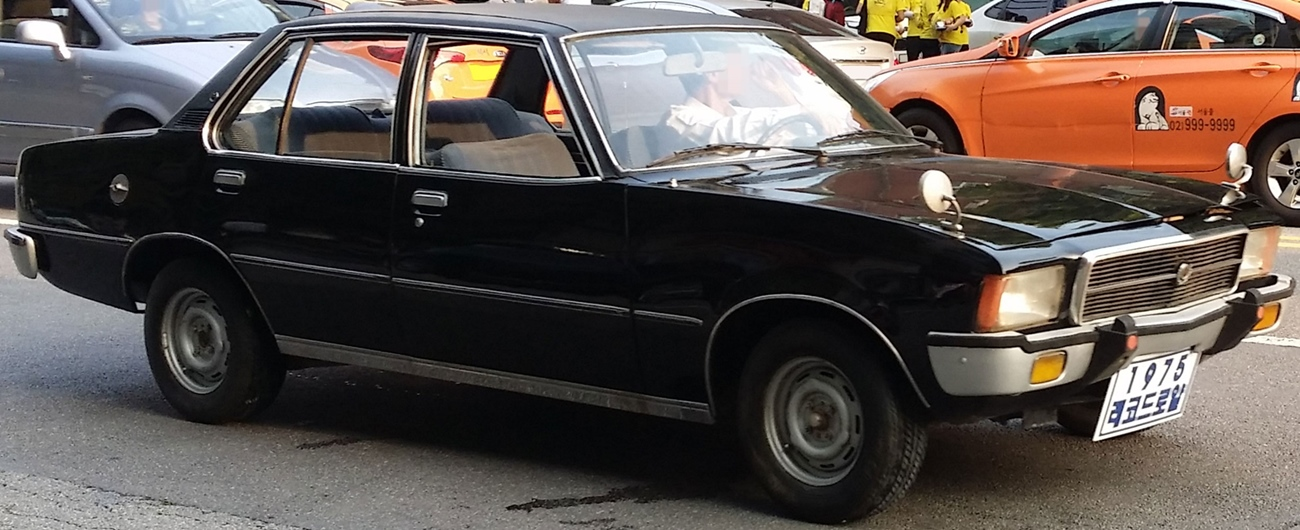
GM Korea Rekord Royale
1975–1978

=== Trucks ===
- Chevrolet 6.5t Cargo — was the first Cargo truck introduced by GMK, licensed version of Isuzu TDX50E cabover truck. The truck was powered by Isuzu V8 engine. It was discontinued in 1975.
- Chevrolet 11t Cargo — a cargo truck licensed version of Isuzu SRZ truck and used the 12,023 cc Isuzu V8 engine producing 180 kW (240 hp). The truck was later sold with the Saehan badge and the MAN D0846HM engine. It was later sold as a Daewoo, before being replaced with the introduction of Daewoo D2848 Cargo Truck.
- Chevrolet 10.5t Dump — licensed version of Isuzu TDX bonnet truck. The truck also used the same engine as the Isuzu TDX truck which produced 180 kW (240 hp). The truck continued to be built by both Saehan and Daewoo Motors using the MAN D0846HM engine. The truck was discontinued after introduction of Daewoo D2848 Dump Truck which is based on Isuzu Super Power.
- GMC Tractor — a 34t tractor truck that is export version of the GMC 9500 Tractor Truck. The truck was equipped with the Detroit Diesel 9,299 cc 8V71 engine producing 218 kW (293 hp).
