= Inkuzart =

Street artist

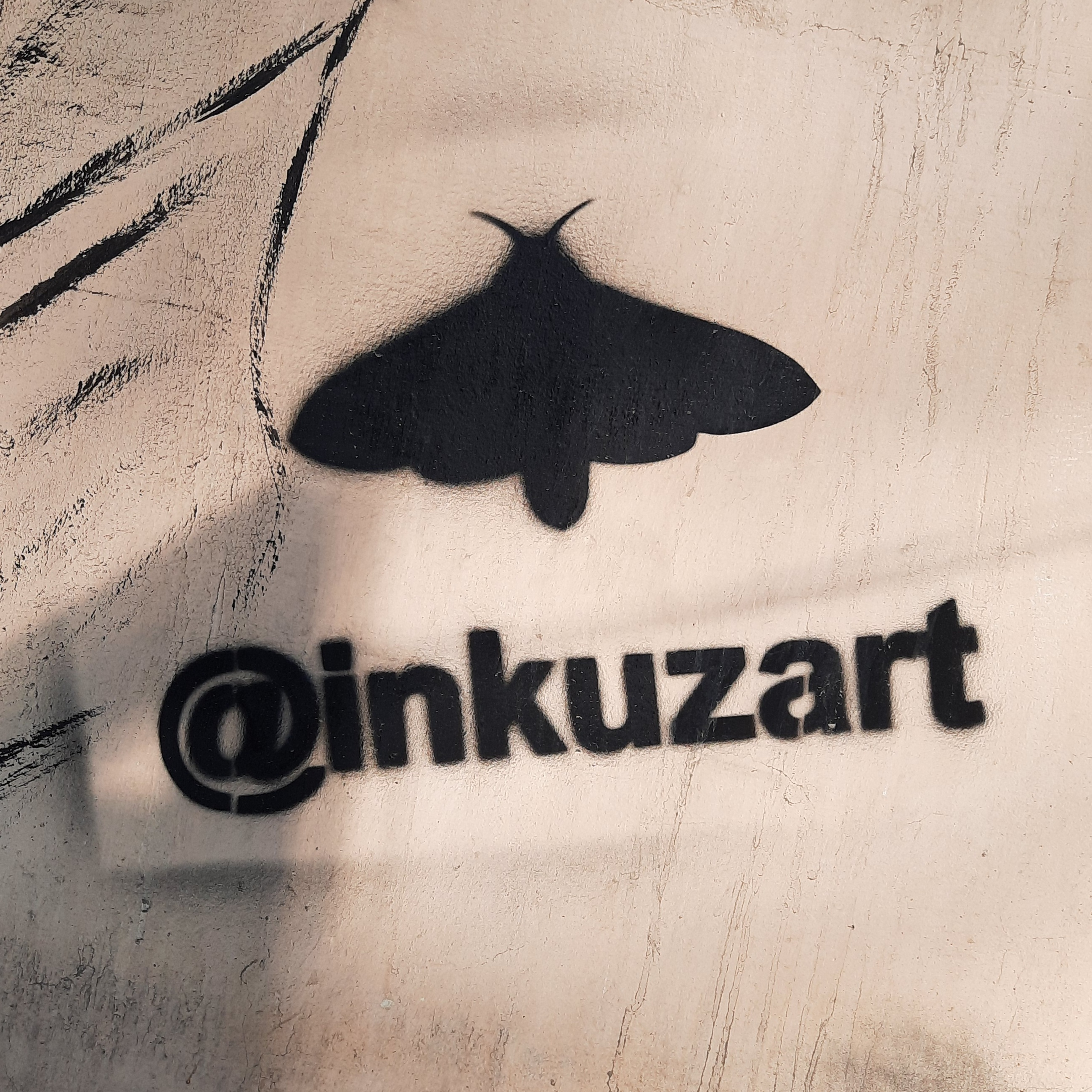
- The sign that Inkuzart leaves under every single work he does
- Born: Uzbekistan

Inkuzart is a pseudonym of the first anonymous street artist in Uzbekistan who started activities in the spring of 2020. Inkuzart dedicated his initial works of art to Coronavirus pandemic. "Night artist" did his first repertoire on the walls of the Tashkent city including the art works of "Creation of Adam", "Mona Liza", "Eye of hope", "Doctor with the angelic wings", "Moon 15/15", "Children rescue", "Coronaball", "Brown eye".

== Socio-political significance ==
His art works of socio-political, critical significance made a heated debate among the population.

The authorities were criticized by public as after Inkuzart's work dedicated for the high price of the petrol in the country was removed from the wall at night of its creation. Another immediate removal of Inkuzart's work was about the huge number of people in the queue for the cars from the only and monopoly car producing company, UzAutoMotors in Uzbekistan.

== Identity of Inkuzart ==
Artist is well known by his nicknames like "Inkuzart", "Night artist", "Banksy from Chilanzar". He prefers to stay anonymous.
