= GM Vietnam =

Automobile manufacturer

GM Vietnam Co., Ltd.
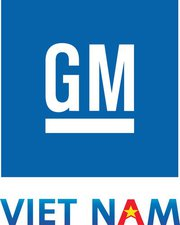
- Formerly: Vietnam-Daewoo Motor Company (1993–2011)
- Type: Subsidiary
- Industry: Automotive
- Founded: 1993
- Defunct: 2018; 8 years ago
- Fate: Sold and merged to VinFast
- Successor: VinFast
- Headquarters: Thanh Trì, Hanoi, Vietnam
- Area served: Vietnam
- Products: Automobiles
- Owner: General Motors
- Parent: GM Korea
- Website: Archived official website at the Wayback Machine (archived December 23, 2017)

General Motors Vietnam Company, Ltd. (formerly Vietnam-Daewoo Motor Company Limited or VIDAMCO) was an automobile manufacturer based in Vietnam and a member of GM Southeast Asia Operations.

The company was officially established in December 1993 as a joint-venture between the Korean Daewoo and the 7983 Mechanic Union Enterprise that was owned by the Vietnamese Ministry of Defense.

In April 2000, the company became a 100% foreign investment enterprise after Daewoo acquired the share of its Vietnamese partner. In July 2011, the name of the company was changed from VIDAMCO to GM Vietnam.

On 28 June 2018, General Motors (GM.N) agreed to transfer its Vietnamese operation to VinFast Trading and Production LLC and distribute Chevrolet vehicles. The transfer, which includes GM's Hanoi plant, dealer network and employee base, was conducted by the end of 2018.

GM used its Hanoi plant to assemble Chevrolets with parts imported from South Korea - a country where the U.S. automaker came close to bankruptcy as it struggled to turn around its debt-laden unit. GM Korea is GM's biggest production base in Asia excluding China. The plant will be used solely to produce VinFast cars after the transfer, while Chevrolet cars will be imported.

VinFast assumed ownership of the GM Hanoi factory, and implemented a significant investment program to build an all-new, global small car licensed from GM and manufactured and sold under the VinFast brand. Production of this vehicle began in 2019, greatly increasing capacity and output at the Hanoi plant and growing the manufacturing base of the dynamic VinFast operation.

== Production ==
=== Discontinued models ===
- Daewoo Cielo (1995–2002)
- Daewoo Nubira (1998–2000)
- Daewoo Leganza (1998–2000)
- Daewoo Matiz (1998–2007)
- Daewoo Lanos (2000–2006)
- Daewoo Magnus (2002–2007)
- Chevrolet Vivant (2008–2011)
- Chevrolet Cruze (2010–2016)
- Chevrolet Captiva (2009–2018)
- Chevrolet Orlando (2011–2018)
- Chevrolet Colorado (2015–2018)
- Chevrolet Trailblazer (2017–2018)
- Chevrolet Aveo (2006–2018)
- Chevrolet Spark (2008–2018)
- Daewoo Damas (1990s–2018)
