= Daewoo Tacuma =

Daewoo Tacuma (U100)
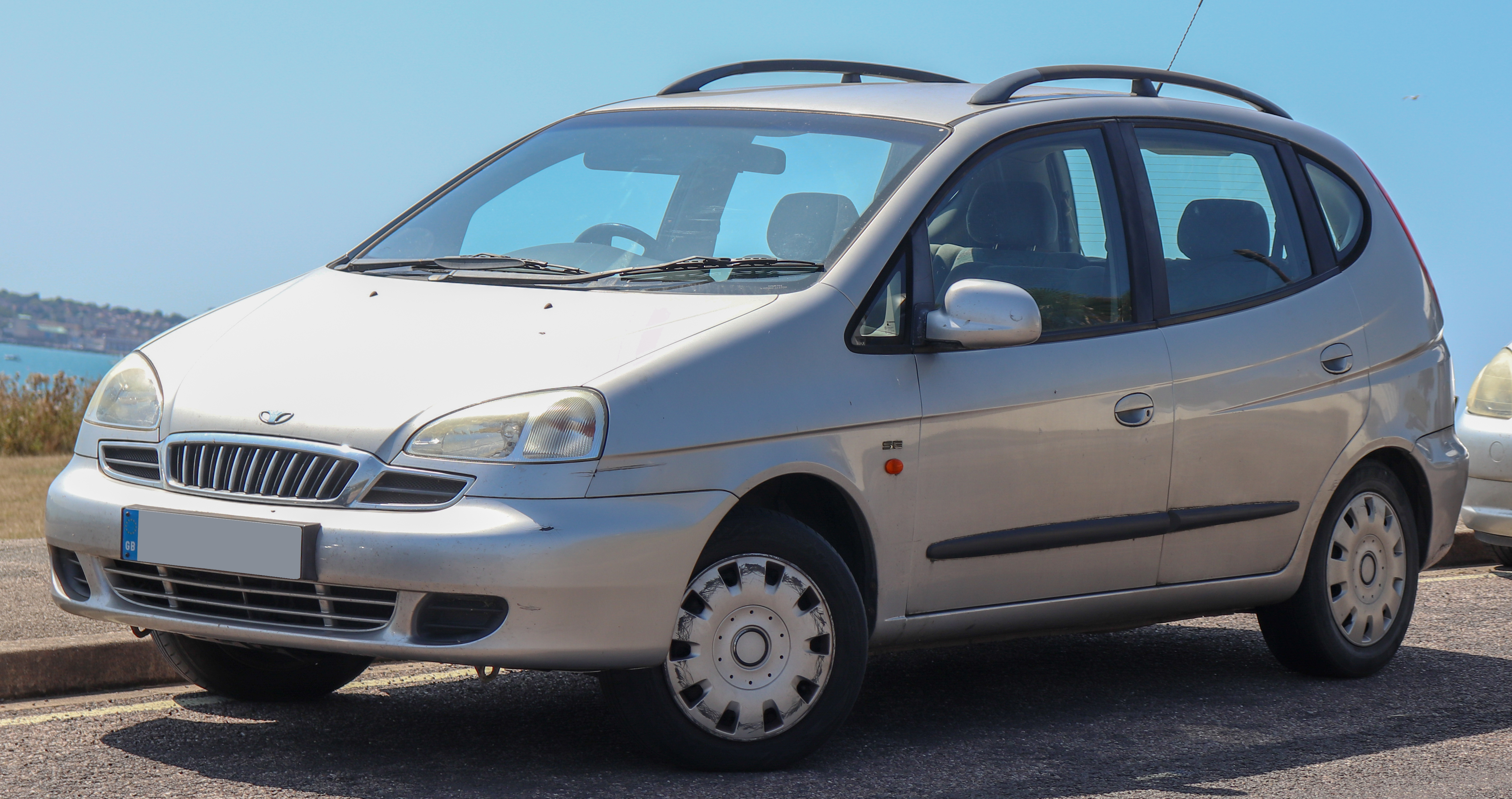

Overview
- Manufacturer: Daewoo (General Motors)
- Also called: Daewoo Rezzo; Chevrolet Tacuma; Chevrolet Rezzo; Chevrolet Vivant
- Production: 2000–2008 (South Korea); 2002–2007 (Romania); 2008–2009 (Uzbekistan); 2008–2011 (Vietnam)
- Assembly: South Korea: Gunsan; Poland: Warsaw (FSO); Romania: Craiova (Rodae); Uzbekistan: Asaka (GM); Vietnam: Hanoi (VIDAMCO)
- Designer: Pininfarina

Body and chassis
- Class: Compact MPV
- Body style: 5-door minivan
- Layout: Front-engine, front-wheel drive
- Related: Daewoo Nubira

Powertrain
- Engine: 1.6 L DOHC E-TEC I4; 1.8 L SOHC E-TEC I4; 2.0 L DOHC D-TEC I4; 2.0 L SOHC E-TEC LPG I4
- Transmission: 5-speed manual; 4-speed ZF 4HP16 automatic

Dimensions
- Wheelbase: 2,500 mm (98.4 in)
- Length: 4,350 mm (171.3 in)
- Width: 1,755 mm (69.1 in)
- Height: 1,580 mm (62.2 in)
- Curb weight: 1,350 kg (2,976 lb)–1,395 kg (3,075 lb)

Chronology
- Successor: Chevrolet Orlando; Chevrolet Spin

The Daewoo Tacuma (or Rezzo, Korean: 대우 레조) is a compact MPV that was produced by South Korean manufacturer Daewoo. Developed under the U100 code name, it was designed by Pininfarina and is based on the original Daewoo Nubira J100, a compact car.

Following the phasing out of Daewoo as a brand in most export markets, the car was rebadged as a Chevrolet, retaining whichever model name had been used in its market. Additionally, the Chevrolet Vivant nameplate was introduced for the Singaporean, Vietnamese, South African and South American markets.

== Engines ==
The Tacuma comes with 1.6-litre Family 1 or 2.0-litre Family II straight-four engines. 1.8 L engine was offered until 2005. It is available with a five-speed manual transmission or a four-speed automatic. The standard Tacuma has a seating capacity of five, but a seven-seater version was also introduced for the South Korean market. Maximum luggage capacity of the Tacuma is 1425 L.

In South Korea, it was called Daewoo Rezzo, and came with 2.0 L Family II straight-4 engines and 2.0L E-TEC SOHC Liquefied petroleum gas (LPG) engines.

In Latin America, South Africa and Singapore, it was called Chevrolet Vivant and came with 1.6L DOHC Family I E-TECH straight-4, 5-speed manual transmission only and 2.0L DOHC Family II D-TECH straight-4, automatic transmission only, for the Tacuma.

== Markets ==
In Vietnam, VIDAMCO once produced the Tacuma as the "Chevrolet Vivant" in complete knock-down kit (CKD), from January 2008 to December 2011.

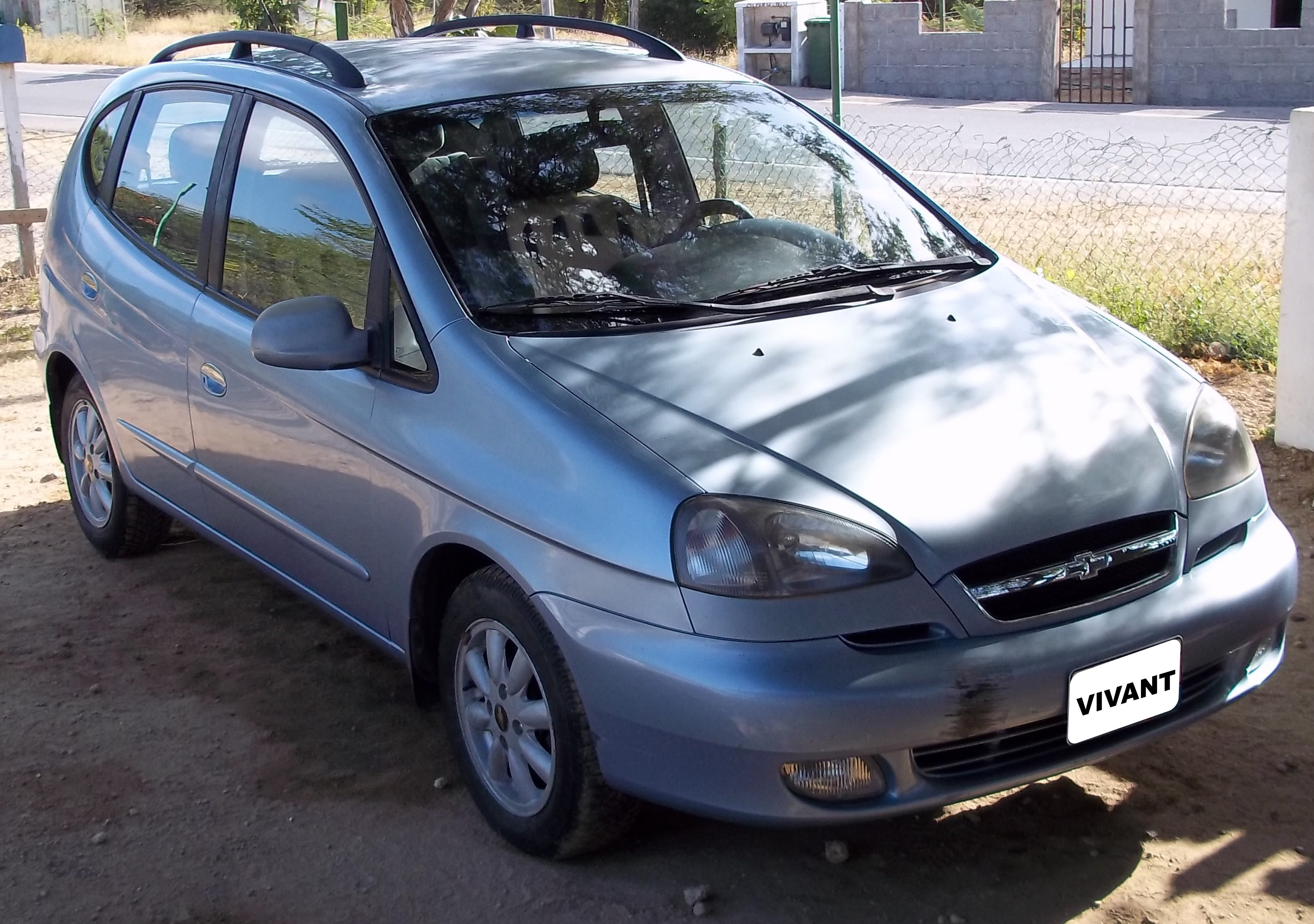
Chevrolet Vivant (Bonaire)

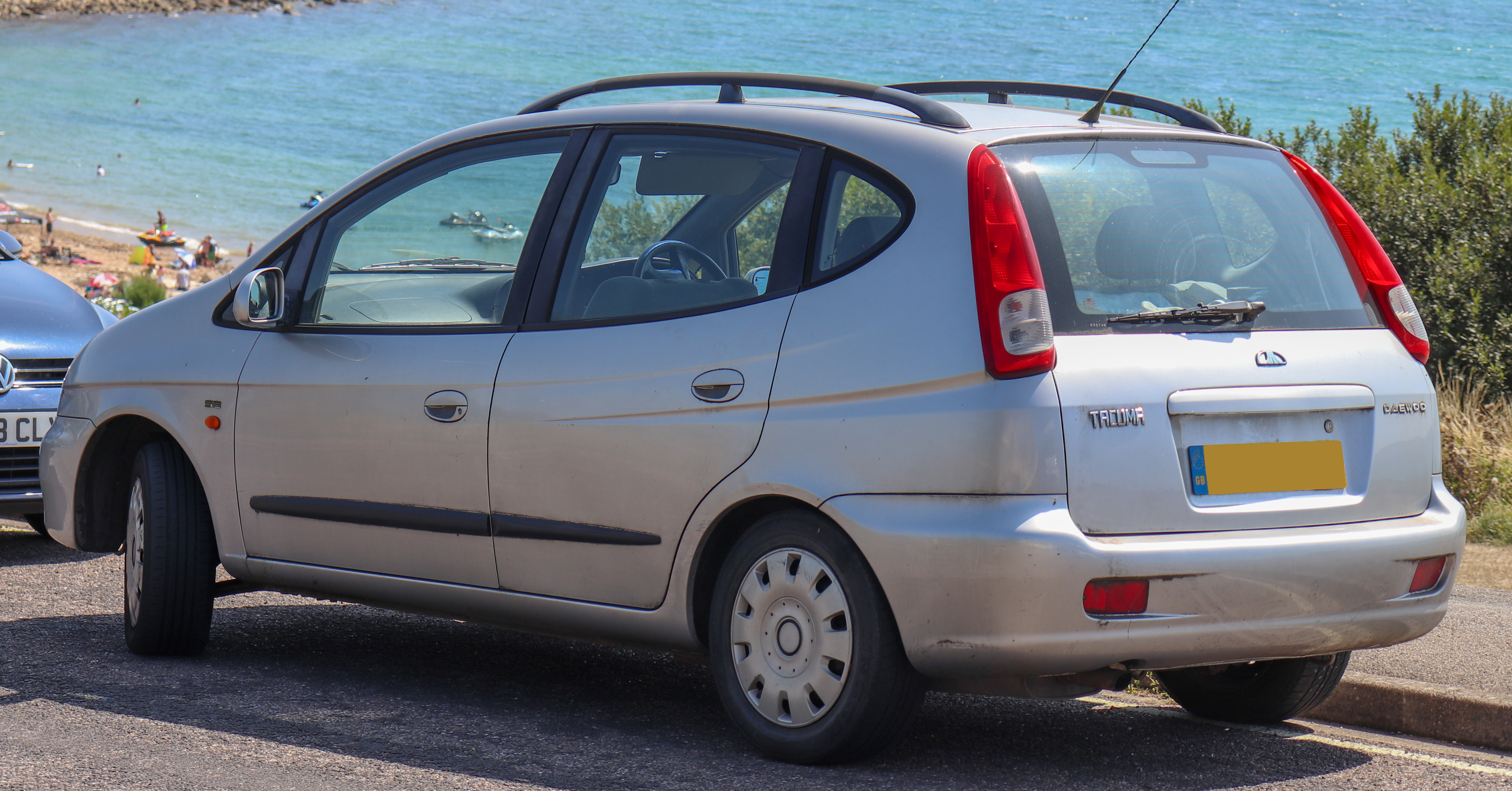
Daewoo Tacuma (UK)

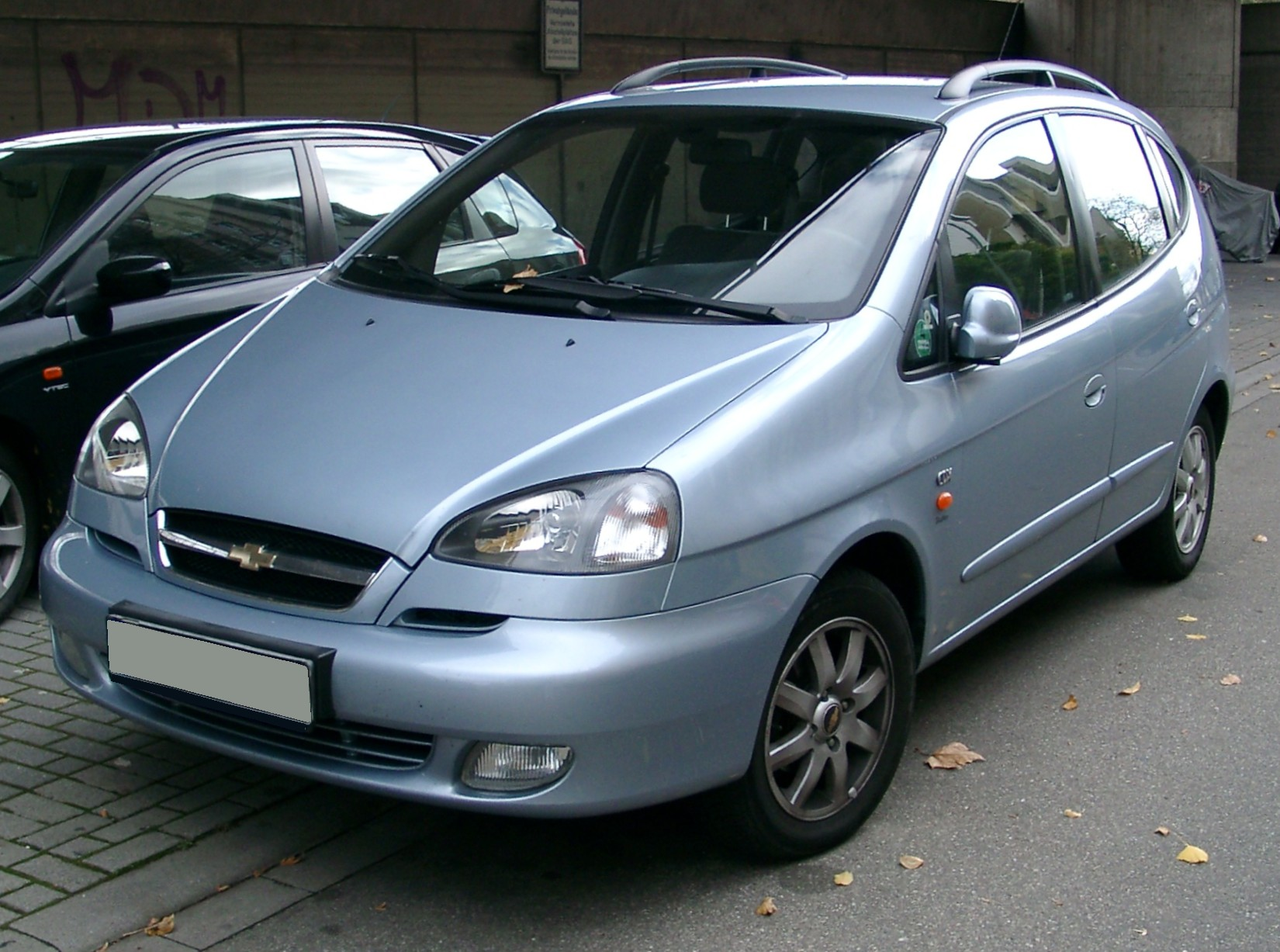
Chevrolet Rezzo

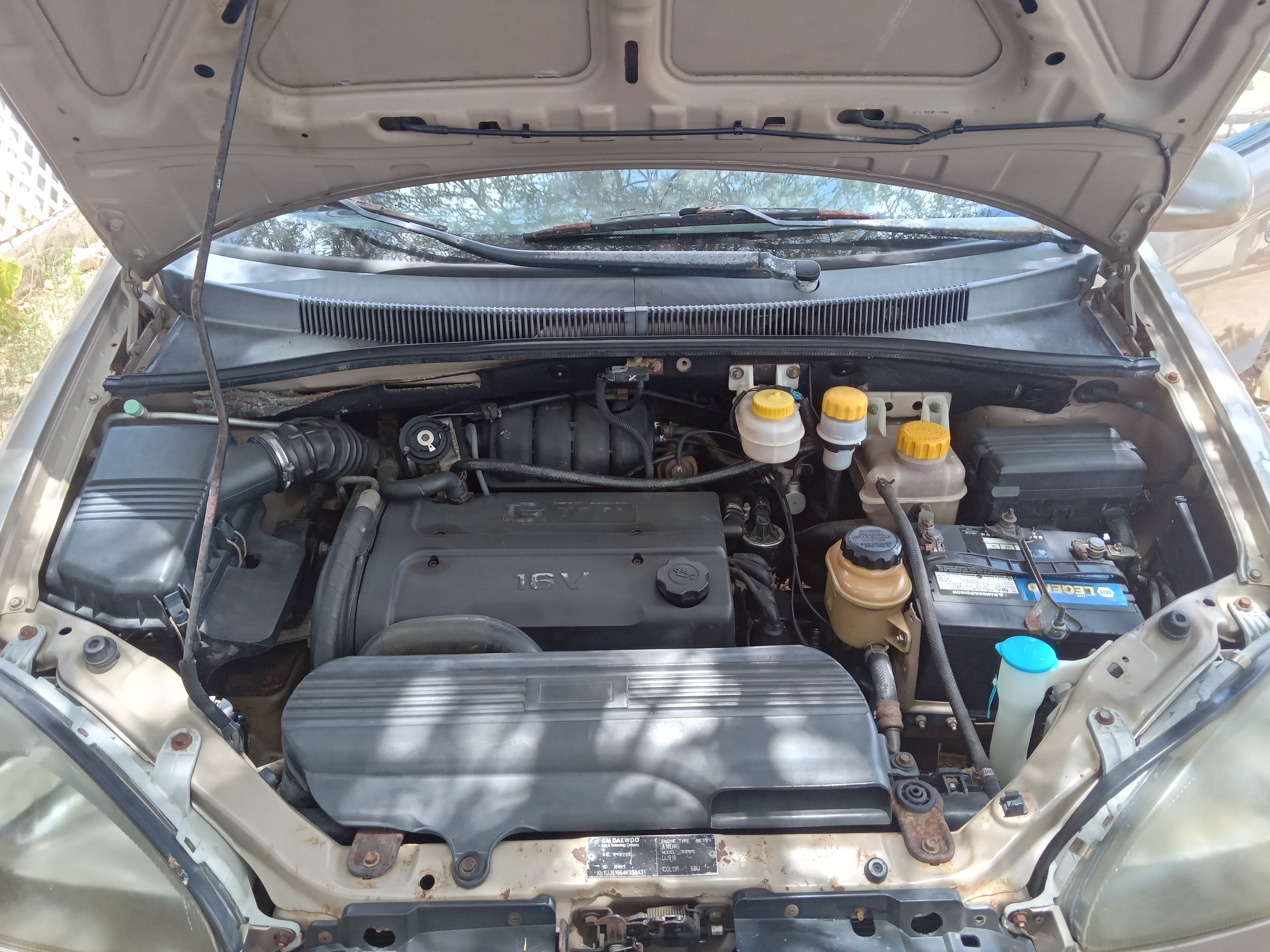
Engine 1.6L (DOHC) Chevrolet Vivant (LS)

== Concept vehicles ==
The production-model Tacuma is following the 1999 Daewoo Tacuma Style Concept and Daewoo Tacuma Sport Concept.
