= Chevrolet Orlando =

Car manufactured by GM Korea under the Chevrolet division

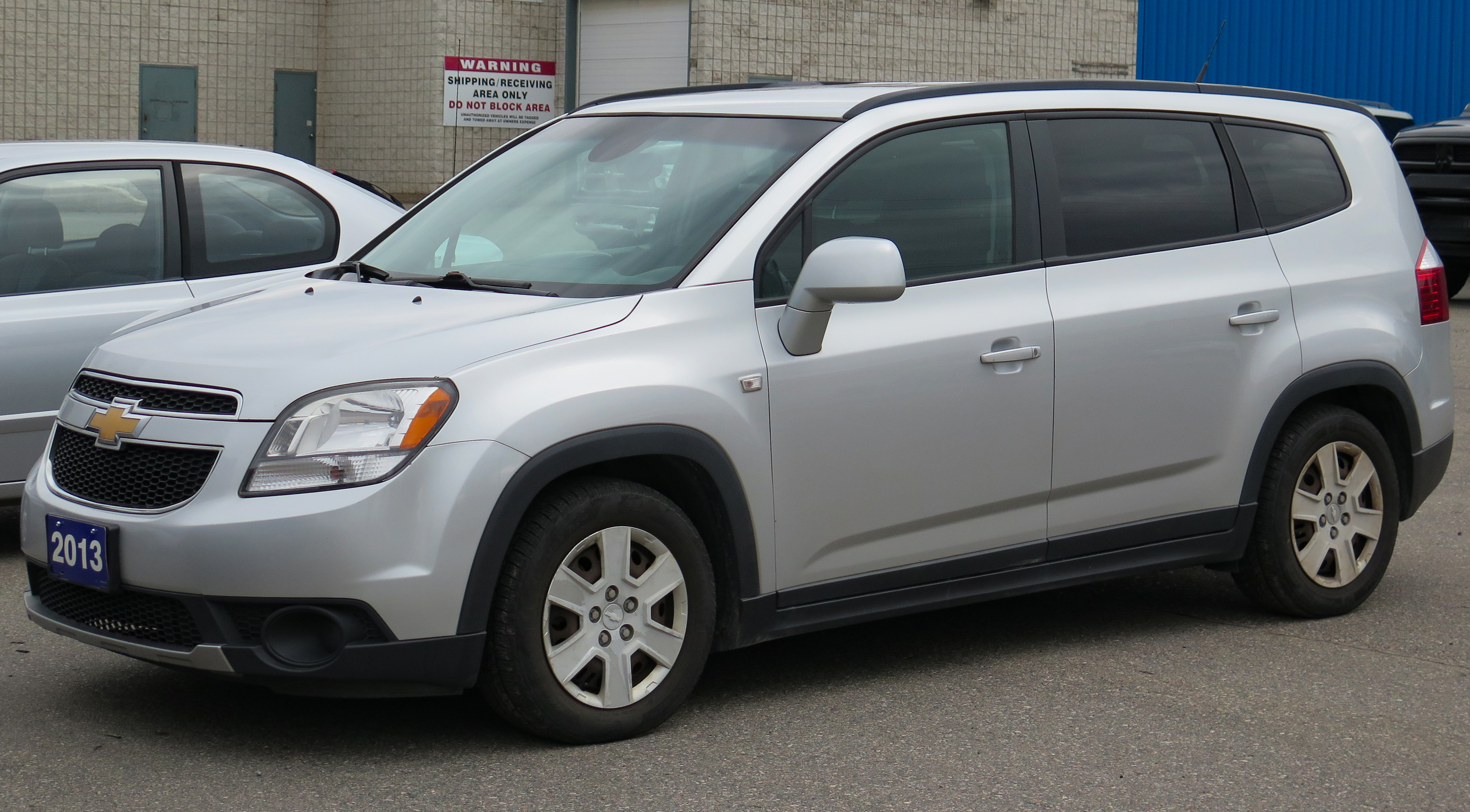

Overview
- Manufacturer: General Motors
- Production: 2010–2023

Body and chassis
- Class: Compact MPV
- Body style: 5-door wagon

Chronology
- Predecessor: Chevrolet Vivant/Tacuma; Chevrolet Zafira

The Chevrolet Orlando (Korean: 쉐보레 올란도) is a three-row compact MPV manufactured by General Motors under the Chevrolet brand from 2010 to 2023. The first-generation model was mainly developed and manufactured by GM Korea, while also assembled in four other countries. Its main markets were South Korea, Europe, Canada, Latin America, and several other Asian countries.

The second-generation model launched in 2018 is solely built and sold in China by SAIC-GM joint venture, sharing the same platform with the Buick GL6. It also marked the end of Orlando production in South Korea.

== First generation (J309; 2010) ==
First generation
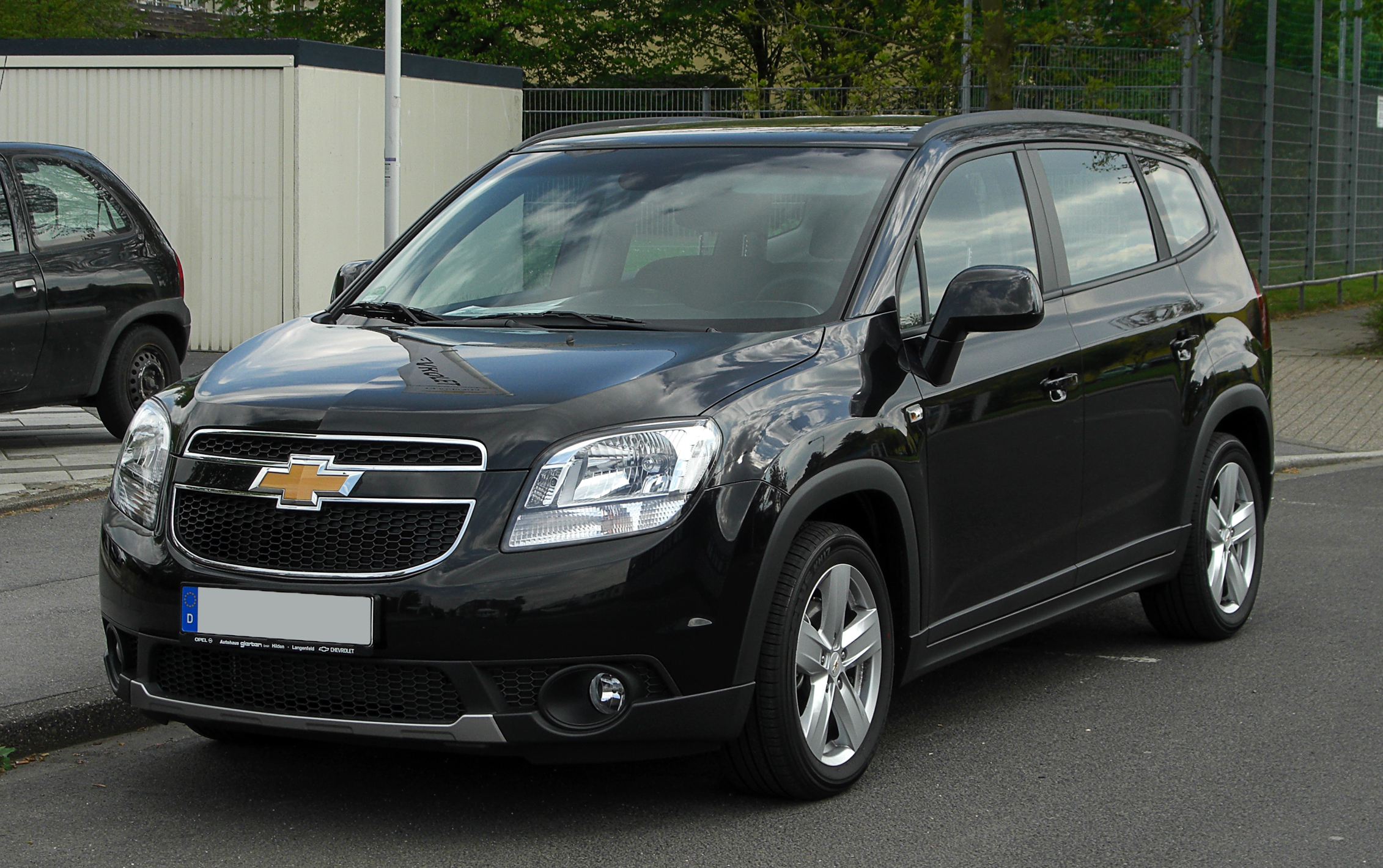

Overview
- Model code: J309
- Production: 2010–2018
- Model years: 2012–2014 (Canada)
- Assembly: South Korea: Gunsan (GM Korea); Vietnam: Hanoi (GM Vietnam); Russia: Kaliningrad (Avtotor); Venezuela: Valencia (GM Venezolana); Uzbekistan: Pitnak (GM Uzbekistan)

Body and chassis
- Layout: Front-engine, front-wheel-drive; Front-engine, all-wheel-drive
- Platform: GM Delta II platform
- Related: Chevrolet Cruze (J300); Opel Zafira Tourer

Powertrain
- Engine: Petrol: 1.4 L Ecotec I4-T; 1.8 L Ecotec I4; 2.4 L Ecotec I4; Diesel: 1.6 L CDTI Ecotec I4-T; 2.0 L VCDi Family Z I4-T
- Power output: 103 kW (138 hp; 140 PS) (1.4 L, petrol); 100 kW (134 hp; 136 PS) (1.6 L, diesel); 104 kW (139 hp; 141 PS) (1.8 L, petrol); 96–120 kW (129–161 hp; 131–163 PS) (2.0 L, diesel); 130 kW (174 hp; 177 PS) (2.4 L, petrol)
- Transmission: 5-speed manual; 6-speed manual; 6-speed automatic

Dimensions
- Wheelbase: 2,760 mm (108.7 in)
- Length: 4,652 mm (183.1 in)
- Width: 1,836 mm (72.3 in)
- Height: 1,633 mm (64.3 in)
- Curb weight: 1,655 kg (3,649 lb)

=== Concept ===
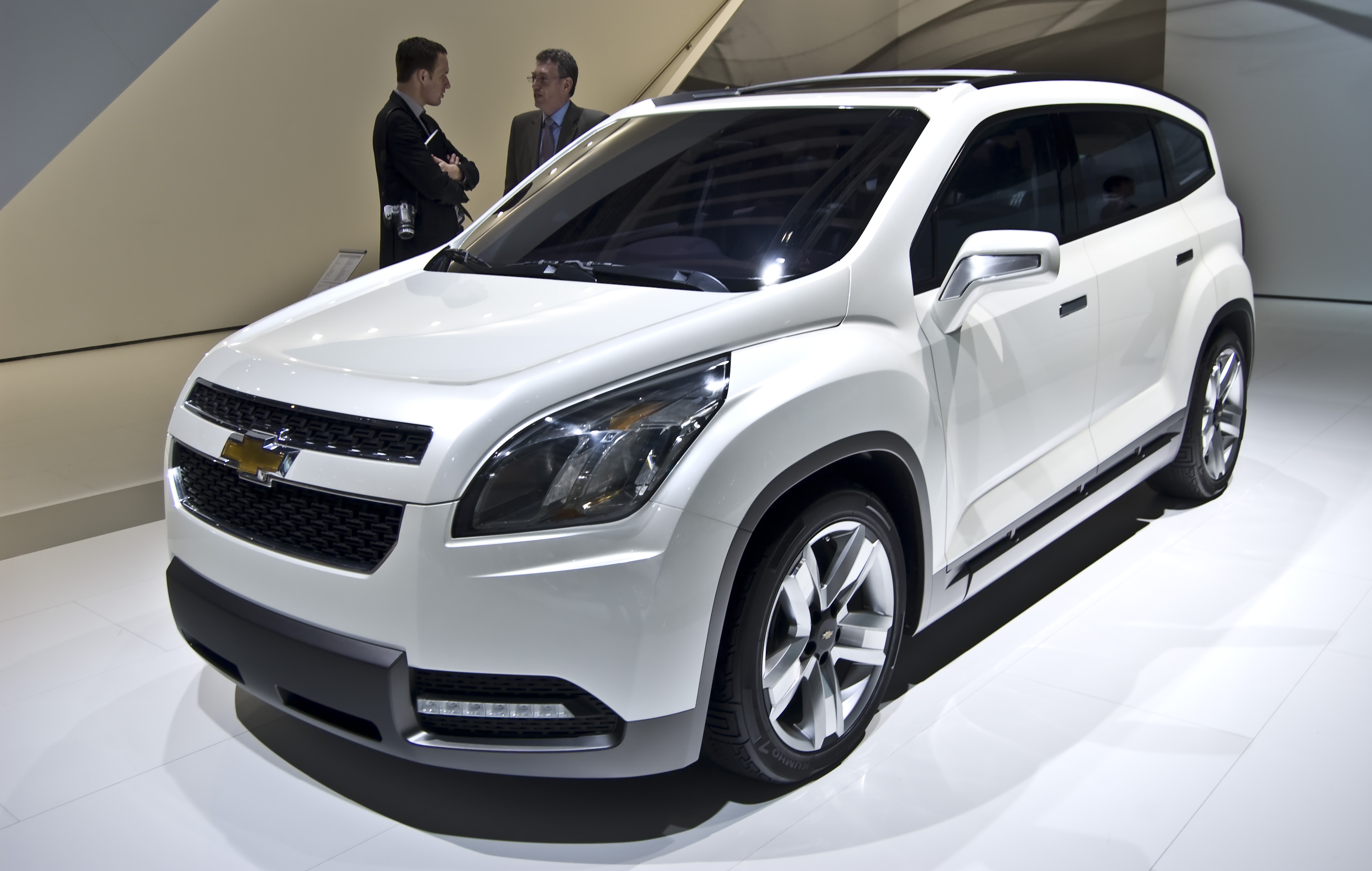
Chevrolet Orlando concept

The Orlando concept was unveiled at the 2008 Paris Motor Show and later at the 2009 North American International Auto Show. It was said to be a 5-door, 7-seat vehicle based on Chevrolet Cruze sedan. The concept model features a two-tier grille, headlamps that flow into the front fenders and muscular fender forms that wrap around the wheels, 2.0-litre 4-cylinder turbo-diesel engine rated 150 PS (110 kW; 148 hp) and 320 N⋅m (236 lb⋅ft).

In 2010, GM showed the GMC Granite small MPV concept, which is similar to the Orlando.

=== Production model ===
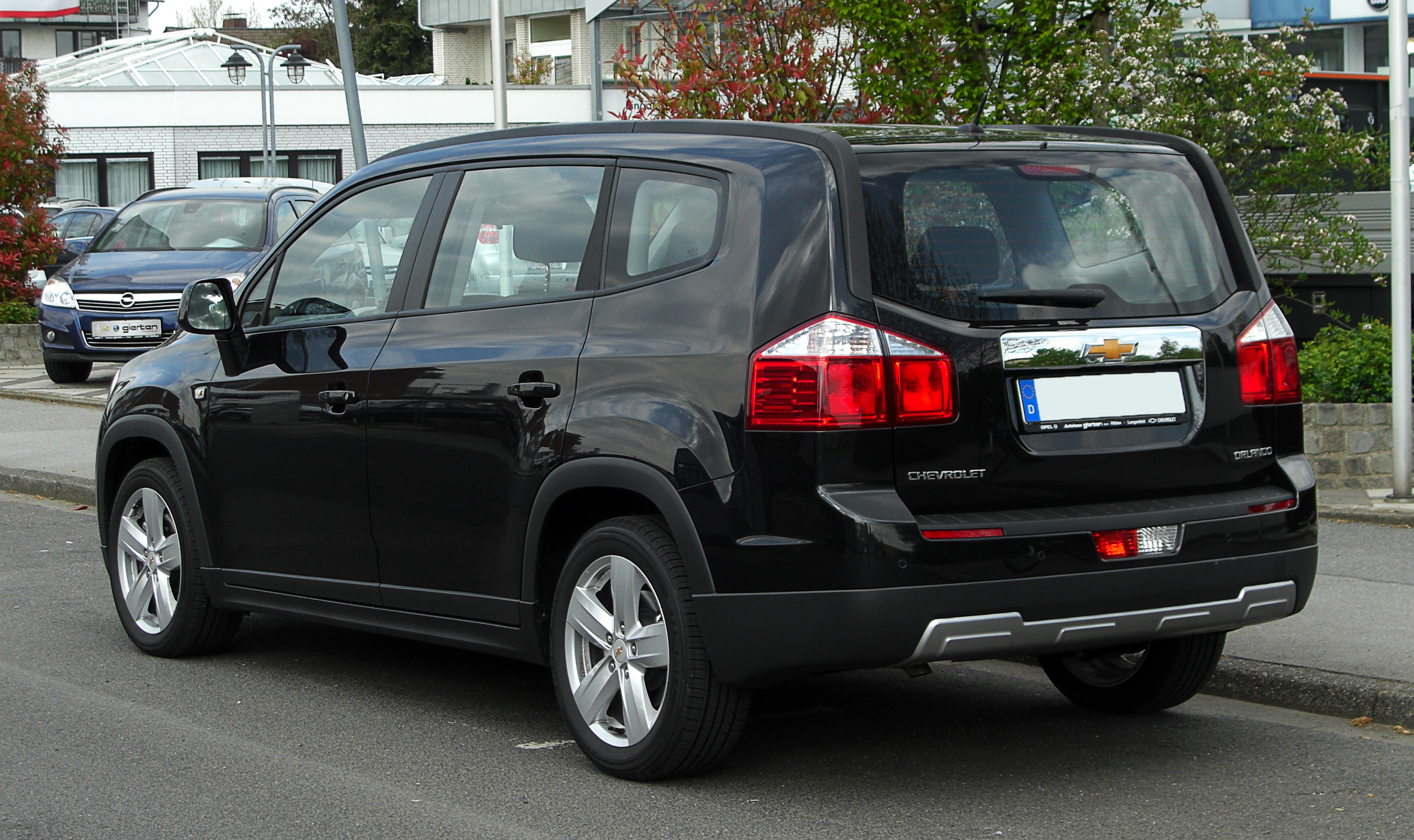
Rear view

In August 2009, at its extended product review, GM previewed the production-spec Orlando and confirmed its production.

The production model was unveiled at the 2010 Busan International Motor Show, followed by the 2010 Paris Motor Show, and the 2013 North American International Auto Show. Production began at the Gunsan assembly plant in South Korea in October 2010. It was sold in South Korea from February 2011, marketed as an "Active Life Vehicle" (ALV), claimed to be the first of its kind.

It is based on the GM Delta II platform mainly used for C-segment vehicles, and closely related with the first-generation Chevrolet Cruze and the third-generation Opel Zafira. Despite being marketed as an MPV, it is designed with a rugged styling similar to crossovers with plastic wheel arches and a boxy stance.

While GM had initially intended to market the Orlando in the United States, they reversed their decision in May 2010. The Chevrolet Orlando was sold in Canada starting in mid-2011 for the 2012 model year. The Orlando was discontinued there after the 2014 model year.

The European model was available from 2011 until 2014 when most of Chevrolet's vehicles, except muscle and sports cars were permanently withdrawn from the European market, except Russia and CIS member nations. Later in 2015, the Chevrolet Orlando was discontinued in the Russian market.

The diesel engine for the Korean market was updated in 2015 to meet the government's Euro 6 requirement. All diesel Chevrolet Orlandos sold in Korea were equipped with a 1.6-litre inline-four CDTi engine outsourced from Opel.

Worldwide production of the first generation Orlando ended in 2018, following the closure of the Gunsan plant in South Korea which produced it.

=== Engines ===
Engine code	Type	Power@rpm	Torque@rpm	Transmission
Petrol engines
LUJ	1.4 L (1,364 cc) Ecotec I4 (t/c)	103 kW (138 hp; 140 PS)	200 N⋅m (148 lb⋅ft)	6-speed manual
2H0	1.8 L (1,796 cc) Ecotec I4	104 kW (139 hp; 141 PS)@6200	176 N⋅m (130 lb⋅ft)@3800	5-speed manual; 6-speed GM 6T45 automatic
LAF	2.4 L (2,384 cc) DI Ecotec LAF I4	130 kW (174 hp; 177 PS)@6700	171 lb⋅ft (232 N⋅m)@4900	6-speed manual; 6-speed Hydra-Matic 6T40 automatic
LEA	2.4 L (2,384) Di Ecotec LEA I4	130 kW (174 hp; 177 PS)@6700	171 lb⋅ft (232 N⋅m)@4900	6-speed manual; 6-speed Hydra-Matic 6T40 automatic
Liquefied petroleum gas engines
LBN	2.0 L (1,998 cc) I4	103 kW (138 hp; 140 PS)@6000	18.8 kg⋅m (184 N⋅m; 136 lb⋅ft)@4600	6-speed automatic
Diesel engines
?	2.0 L (1,998 cc) VCDi Family Z I4 turbo	96 kW (129 hp; 131 PS)@3800	315 N⋅m (232 lb⋅ft)@2000	6-speed manual
Z20D1	2.0 L (1,998 cc) VCDi Family Z I4 turbo	120 kW (161 hp; 163 PS)@3800	360 N⋅m (266 lb⋅ft)@1750–2750	6-speed manual; 6-speed GM 6T45 automatic

Canadian models included 2.4-litre direct injection petrol four-cylinder engine. European models include 1.8-litre petrol, 2.0-litre diesel engines. South Korean models include 2.0-litre LPG and 2.0-litre (163PS) diesel engines before update to 1.6-litre Opel diesel in 2015.

=== Safety ===
Euro NCAP test results* Chevrolet Orlando (2011)
Test	Points	%
Overall:	5 /5 stars	
Adult occupant:	34	95%
Child occupant:	39	79%
Pedestrian:	18	49%
Safety assist:	5	71%

=== Marketing ===
As part of the Chevrolet Orlando launch in the UK, a life-sized Play-Doh clay model replica was unveiled in London in 2011.

== Second generation (2018) ==
Second generation
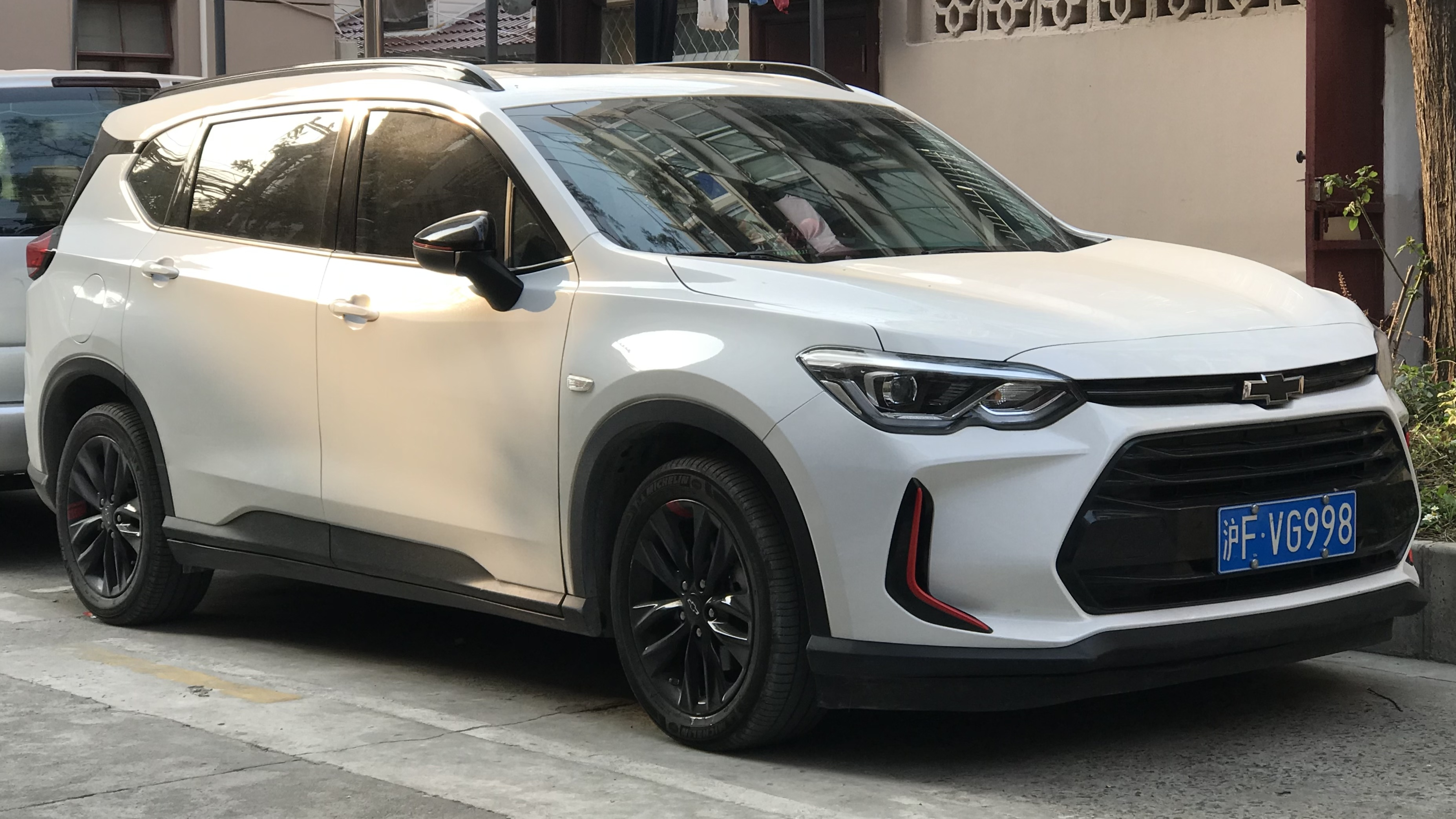

Overview
- Production: 2018–2023
- Assembly: China: Yantai, Shandong (SAIC-GM)

Body and chassis
- Layout: Front-engine, front-wheel-drive
- Platform: D2XX platform
- Related: Buick Envision; Buick GL6

Powertrain
- Engine: Petrol: 1.35 L L3T Ecotec I3-T
- Power output: 156 hp (116 kW; 158 PS); 161 hp (120 kW; 163 PS) (Redline Package)
- Transmission: 6-speed manual; 6-speed automatic

Dimensions
- Wheelbase: 2,796 mm (110.1 in)
- Length: 4,684 mm (184.4 in)
- Width: 1,807 mm (71.1 in)
- Height: 1,628 mm (64.1 in)

Chronology
- Predecessor: Chevrolet Lova RV

The second generation Orlando is solely made and sold in China, manufactured by SAIC-GM. It was available in 5- and 7-seater versions. Power comes from a 1.35 L (1,349 cc) turbocharged three-cylinder engine producing 156 hp (116 kW; 158 PS) at 5,500 rpm and 170 lb⋅ft (230 N⋅m) between 1,800–4,400 rpm. Optional Redline Package makes engine output to 161 hp (120 kW; 163 PS).

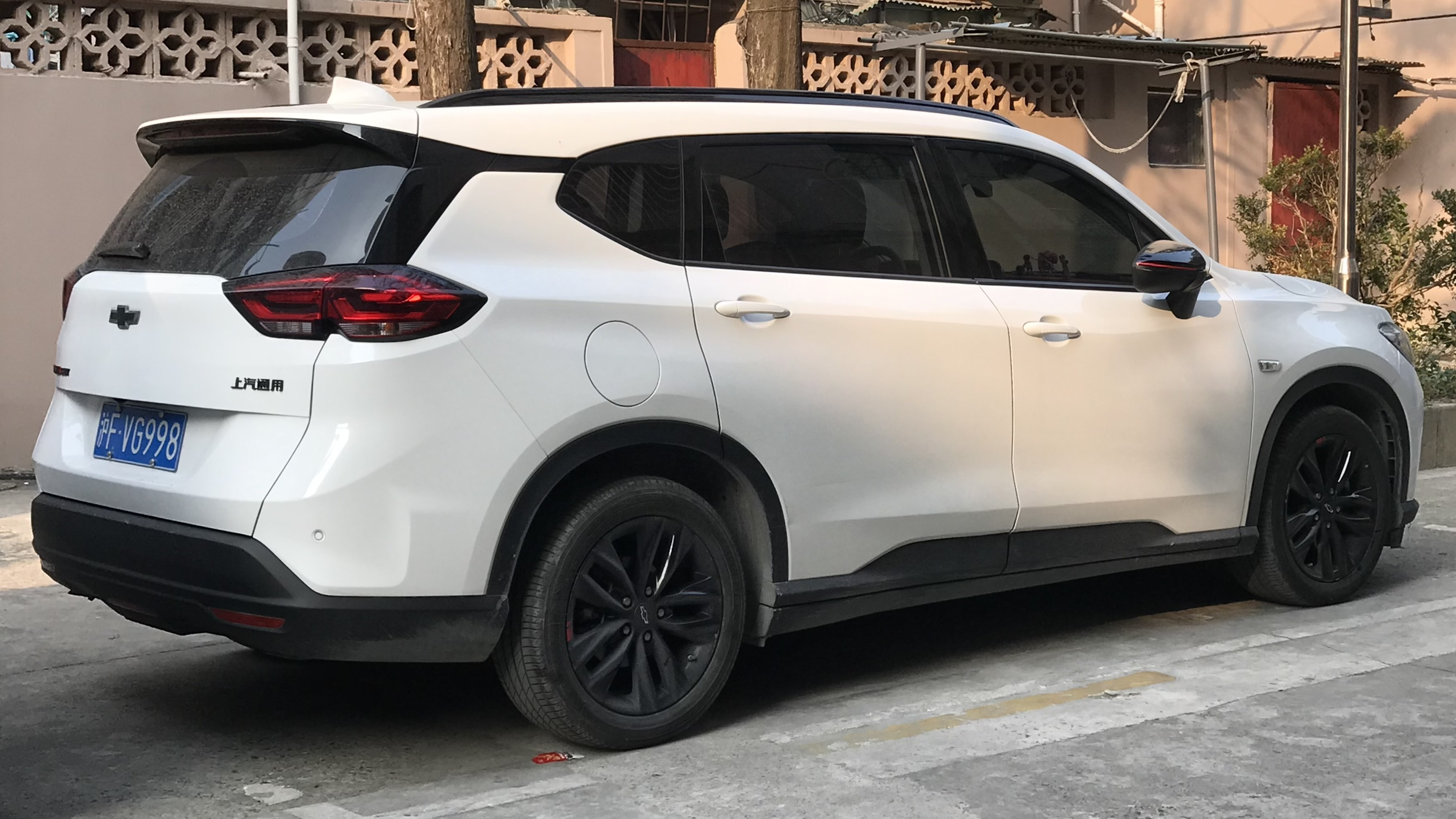
Rear view

== Sales ==
Year	Europe	Canada	South Korea	China
2010	42			
2011	19,938			
2012	22,752	7,199		
2013	13,424	2,339		
2014	2,925	1,339	20,696	
2015	44	31	19,686	
2016	2		12,881	
2017			8,067	
2018	1		2,171	11,807
2019				26,553
2020				10,777
2021				2,980
