= Bo Andersson (businessman) =

Swedish businessman (born 1955)

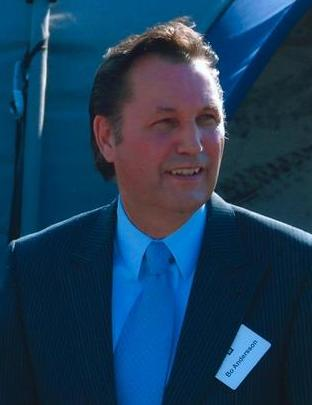
- Bo Inge Andersson (2012)
- Born: Bo Inge Andersson; 16 October 1955 (age 70); Falkenberg, Sweden
- Education: Stockholm University
- Occupation: Businessman

Bo Inge Andersson (born 16 October 1955) is a Swedish businessman, and former officer and diplomat.

Bo Andersson is currently Senior Advisor for Sanoh Industrial Ltd (Tokyo). He also founded Ivanhoe IV, an investment company where he is president.

Previously, Bo Andersson's career included roles at Saab Automobile, General Motors, GAZ Group. Avtovaz, Yazaki, and UzAuto Motors.

== Education ==
Andersson grew up in the south of Sweden. He graduated from the Swedish Army Academy and then served in the army. He left the military with the rank of Major. Andersson received a bachelor's degree from Stockholm University and completed the Advanced Management Program (AMP) at Harvard Business School.

== Career ==
=== General Motors ===
Andersson began his business career in 1987 as a purchasing manager in Saab Automotive AB where in 1990 he was promoted to the Vice-President of Saab Purchasing. In 1993 he moved to Detroit to work at the position of Executive Director of Electrical Purchasing Group at General Motors (GM). A year later he was appointed Executive Director of Chemicals Purchasing Group for GM and worked in this position for three years. In 1997 he moved to Germany to hold position of Vice-President for Purchasing in Europe. In 2001 Andersson became part of GM top management, working as Vice-President for Purchasing worldwide until 2007, when he became Vice-President of Global Purchasing and Supply Chain. Andersson held this position until 2009, when he was recruited by GAZ Group.

=== GAZ Group ===
Andersson left GM in 2009 and became an advisor to Oleg Deripaska (a Russian industrial tycoon) and a board member of GAZ Group – including the oldest automotive plant in Russia and the largest manufacturer of light commercial vehicles, buses and off-road heavy trucks.

Andersson became the president of GAZ Group on 7 August 2009, with the primary goal of turning around the loss-making company. During his five years at GAZ, he managed to turn a loss of 30.5 billion rubles (approx. US$1 billion) in 2008, into a profit of 8.8 billion rubles in 2012. Profit improvement was, among other things, attributed to the down-sizing of 50,000 employees, the successful launch of next generation light commercial vehicle (GAZelle Next) and a four-fold improvement in productivity.

=== AVTOVAZ ===
On 5 November 2013, Bo Andersson was appointed the President of JSC AVTOVAZ the largest Russian car manufacturer which produced old fashioned Lada branded vehicles and was losing market share. The Swedish manager has become the first foreign president of the company.

Andersson announced his resignation on 17 February 2016. He agreed to remain in his role until 3 April to support the transition to new leadership. From April 2016, Bo Andersson was the CEO of Bo Group Enterprises.

=== Yazaki ===
From July 2017 through April 2021, Andersson was president of Yazaki Europe. In March 2018, he was named President & CEO of Yazaki North & Central America. This is in addition to his role as President of Yazaki Europe, which he has held since July 2017. He was responsible for 129 locations, in 28 countries, 140,000 team members and more than $8 billion in revenue. He was also head of Yazaki's Global Purchasing organization.

From April to June 2021, Andersson was senior executive advisor to Yazaki Europe & Africa and North & Central America, to support the transition to the new leadership. Yazaki is the world's largest producer of electrical wiring harnesses for the automotive industry.

=== UzAuto Motors ===
Andersson was appointed CEO of UzAuto Motors and UzAuto Motors Powertrain – the largest manufacturing subsidiaries of UzAvtoSanoat in August 2021. UzAvtoSanoat is owned by Uzbekistan's government, and produces Chevrolet vehicles under a technical license agreement with GM.

Since 2021, UzAuto Motors has increased its annual production and sales volume by more than 60%, up to 400,000+ units, and also created 4,000 new jobs.

The Company successfully launched industrial production of Chevrolet Tracker and Chevrolet Onix. It was made possible by transition to the modern GM GEM aggregate platform (Global Emerging Markets is the automotive platform of the American GM).

As a result, Uzbekistan has become the second largest manufacturer of Chevrolet cars in the world, became the second most important market for the brand (ahead of Brazil, Mexico and even China), and UzAuto Motors set up production records two consecutive years in a row.

In the year of 2022, 327,629 cars rolled off the assembly line. The following year, 2023, the company produced another record amount of 395,400 vehicles (i.e. 20% more than a year earlier).

Thus, in 2022–2023, the automotive industry of Uzbekistan managed to become the leader in the production of passenger cars in the CIS and Central Asian countries.

We grew revenues by nearly 130% (yearly net profit on average exceeded 7 percent, with 7.2 percent in 2023 that amounted to $333 million).

=== Sanoh ===
As of 2025, Bo Andersson continues his engagement as senior advisor to Sanoh Industrial Co., Ltd. – Ibaraki, Japan, with a primary focus on improving production and increasing sales in Europe and North/South America.
