= UzAuto Motors =

Uzbekistan state automotive manufacturer

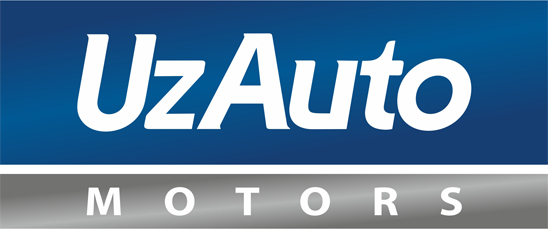
- Formerly: Uz-DaewooAuto (1992–2001); GM Uzbekistan (2008–2019)
- Type: Joint venture
- Traded as: Tashkent Stock Exchange: UZMT
- ISIN: UZ7003040001
- Industry: Automotive
- Predecessor: GM Uzbekistan (2008–2019)
- Founded: March 2008; 18 years ago
- Fate: Acquired by the Government of Uzbekistan in 2019
- Headquarters: 81 Humo Street, Asaka (Andijan Region), Uzbekistan
- Number of locations: 2 production plants (Asaka, Pitnak) and 1 branch (Tashkent)
- Key people: Bo Andersson, CEO
- Products: Automobiles
- Production output: 327 thousand vehicles (2022)
- Brands: Chevrolet; Ravon
- Revenue: 3,265,415,000 USD (2022)
- Net income: 235,119,000 USD (2022)
- Owner: Publicly traded company (99,7% owned by the state through Uzavtosanoat, 0,3% private equity)
- Number of employees: 16,000 (August 2023)
- Parent: UzAvtosanoat JSC (99.7%) through its subsidiary PVM LLC
- Website: uzautomotors.com

UzAuto Motors (formerly GM Uzbekistan) is an automotive manufacturer owned by the Government of Uzbekistan. It is based in Asaka, Uzbekistan. It manufactures vehicles under the Chevrolet marque. Formerly UzAuto Motors had also manufactured vehicles under the Ravon marque, which is Uzbek for calm and straight road or easy journey.

It was formerly partly owned by General Motors and, in 2019, it was acquired by the Uzbekistan government and renamed "UzAuto Motors". By February 2023, the company completed an IPO on the Tashkent Stock Exchange.

== History ==
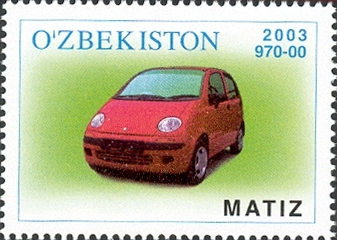
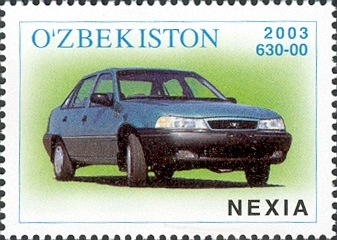
Uzbek stamps of the Daewoo Matiz and Nexia models

The company was founded in 1992 between the Uzbek state-owned UzAvtosanoat and the South Korea-based Daewoo, and was initially known as "Uz-DaewooAuto" (Uzbek: O'z-DeuAvto). The company began production of vehicles on 19 July 1996, at the new assembly plant in Asaka.

Uz-DaewooAuto produced vehicles under the brand name Uz-Daewoo. The initiative to establish the Uzbek automobile industry goes back to the early 1990s and the administration of President of Uzbekistan Islam Karimov.

Following Daewoo's collapse in 2001, and resulting change of ownership, "GM Uzbekistan" was eventually established in March 2008 as a new replacement joint venture, and the Nexia and Matiz were sold under the Chevrolet badge together with an extended range of GM Korea Chevrolet models produced at the Asaka factory.

Daewoo was acquired by General Motors and became GM Daewoo. Subsequently, the facility was renamed "GM Uzbekistan" in 2008. The joint venture was owned by UzAvtosanoat JSC (75%) and General Motors (25%). GM Uzbekistan produced 106,334 units during the first half of 2011.

Given the change in name and ownership, the model range changed, although the company continued producing Uz-Daewoo branded vehicles until 2015. Some models based on these are still sold as Chevrolets.

GM Uzbekistan began production on 27 November 2008. The first assembled car on this day was a Chevrolet Lacetti which also was the 1,000,000th assembled vehicle out of the production from UzAvtosanoat. Chevrolet manufactured the Chevrolet Spark M300 in Asaka, a model for now intended only for export. The models are assembled as knock-down kits.

"GM Uzbekistan" logo before the renaming in 2019

Following an agreement in 2008, "GM Powertrain Uzbekistan" opened an engine plant in Tashkent, 400 kilometres (248.5 mi) from GM Uzbekistan's vehicle manufacturing facility in Asaka, in November 2011. The factory is GM's first engine plant in Uzbekistan and has a production capacity of 225,000 1.2L and 1.5L Daewoo S-TEC engines per year for use in GM small passenger cars worldwide.

Another plant produced 200,000 units of front-rear and side windows for the vehicles of the Uz-DaewooAvto and the Chevrolet Lacetti. A third production facility was opened in 2014 in Pitnak, Khorezm Region, manufacturing the Damas/Labo microvans and the Chevrolet Orlando minivan.

In 2010, about 5,000 people were employed at the GM Uzbekistan assembly plant. GM Uzbekistan sold 121,584 vehicles locally in 2011, making the country the eighth-largest market for Chevrolet and produced more than 225,000 vehicles. Its products are also exported to Russia and other CIS countries.

Daewoo Gentra model in 2013, the Chevrolet Orlando in 2014, and the Chevrolet Nexia T250 in 2015.

In 2019, the Government of Uzbekistan acquired the company and renamed it "UzAuto Motors".

In 2020, UzAuto began importing the Chevrolet Equinox, Trailblazer, Traverse, and Tahoe SUVs, with intent to produce them locally if there is sufficient demand. UzAuto phased out the Ravon brand in 2020, merging it back into the Chevrolet brand as the Chevrolet Spark (R2), Nexia (R3), Cobalt (R4), and Lacetti (R5/Gentra).

In April 2021, the company announced plans to produce Chevrolet-branded vehicles for the Russian market.

In August 2021, Swedish entrepreneur Bo Andersson was named chief executive officer of the company.

Since 2022, the company ceased exports to Russian and Belarus markets due to international sanctions. Ukrainian exports were temporarily stopped due to logistical limitations.

In October 2022, the company announced its intention to IPO on the domestic market. In late November the company announced its pricing. This IPO was intended to be one of three "People's IPOs" planned by the government in the next couple of years. In 2022, Fitch Ratings upgraded the company's rating to "BB-, Outlook Stable". The company created monopoly in the country, as a result locals do not have many choices other than buying its cars with higher price. That's also because of high custom tariffs when individuals import foreign brand cars into Uzbekistan.

== Produced models ==
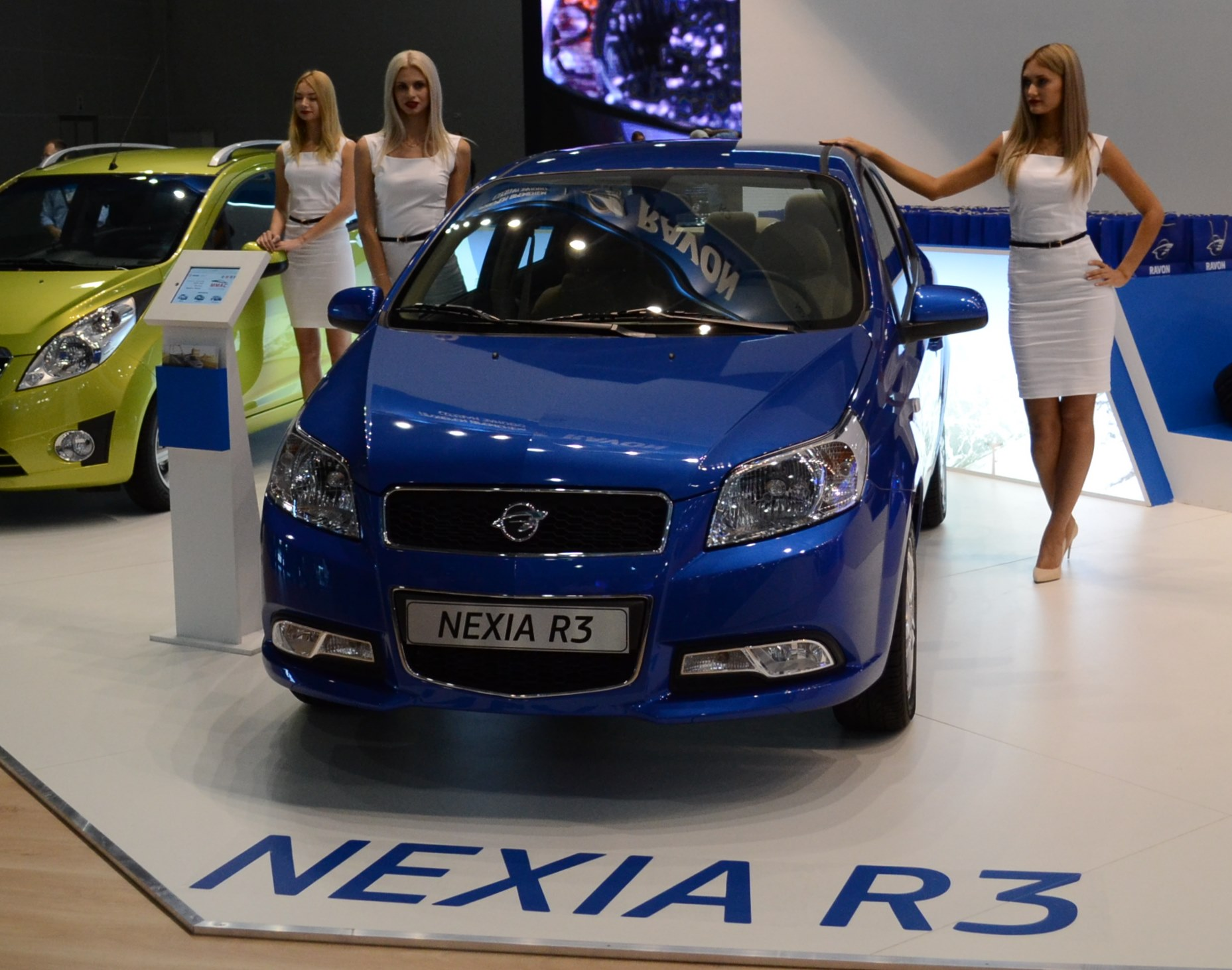
Ravon Nexia R3

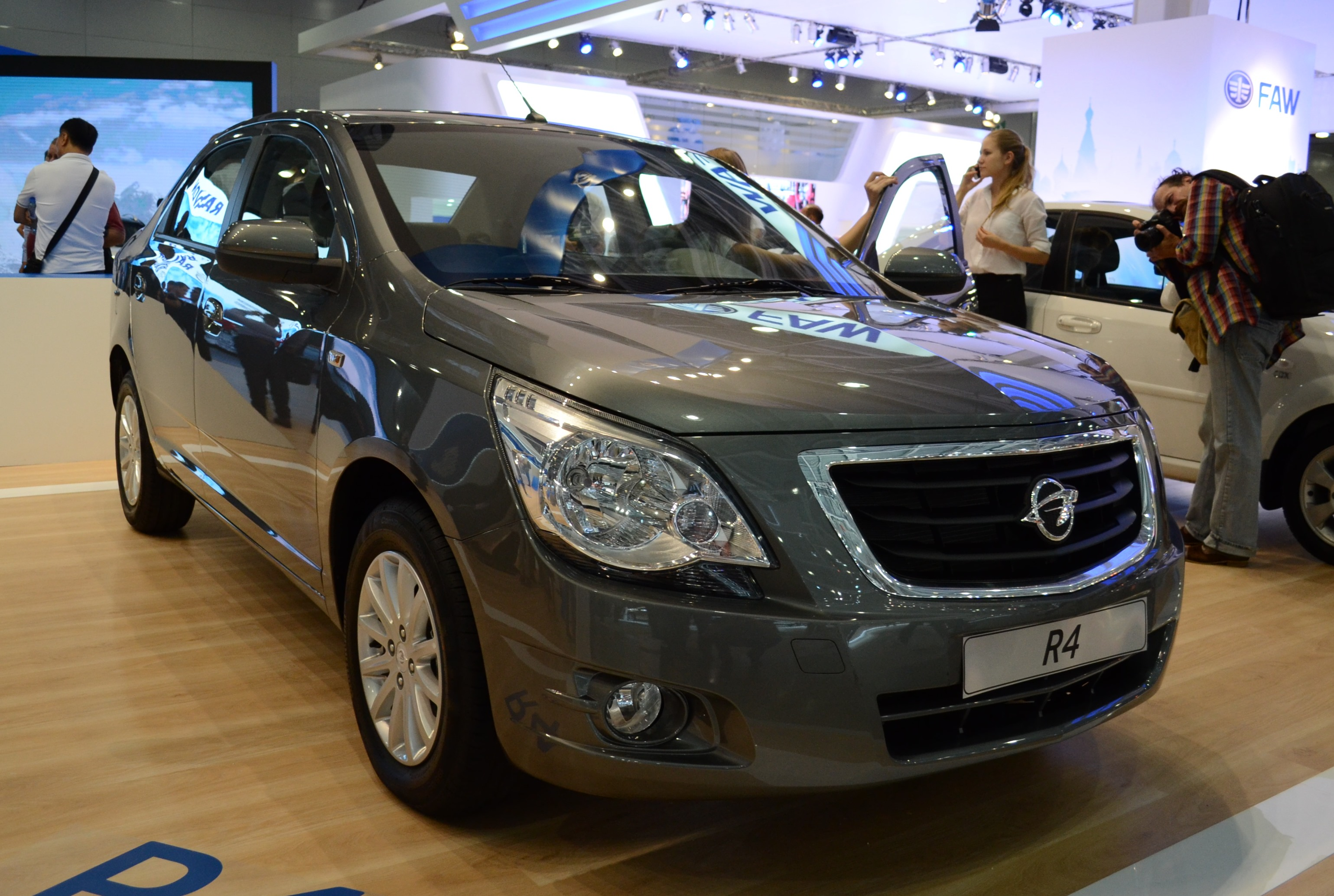
Ravon R4

- Chevrolet Damas (1996–present)
- Chevrolet Labo (2015–present)
- Chevrolet Cobalt (previously Ravon Cobalt/R4) (2012–present)
- Chevrolet Onix (2023–present)
- Chevrolet Tracker (2022–present)

== Imported models ==
- Chevrolet Tahoe - fifth generation (2020–present)
- Chevrolet Traverse - 2nd generation (facelift) (2020–present)
- Chevrolet Captiva - 2nd generation (Baojun 530) (2021-present)

== Formerly produced models ==
- Daewoo Tico (1996–2001)
- Daewoo Nexia (N100, 1996–2008)
- Daewoo Nexia II (N150, 2008–2016)
- Chevrolet Nexia III (T250) (previously Ravon Nexia/R3) (2015–2023)
- Chevrolet Orlando (2014–2018)
- Ravon Matiz R1 (2001–2018)
- Chevrolet Spark (previously Ravon Spark/R2) (2010–2023)
- Chevrolet Tracker (2018–2020)
- Chevrolet Lacetti (2003–2013) (previously Ravon Gentra/R5) (2013–2024)

== Gallery ==
=== Currently produced cars ===
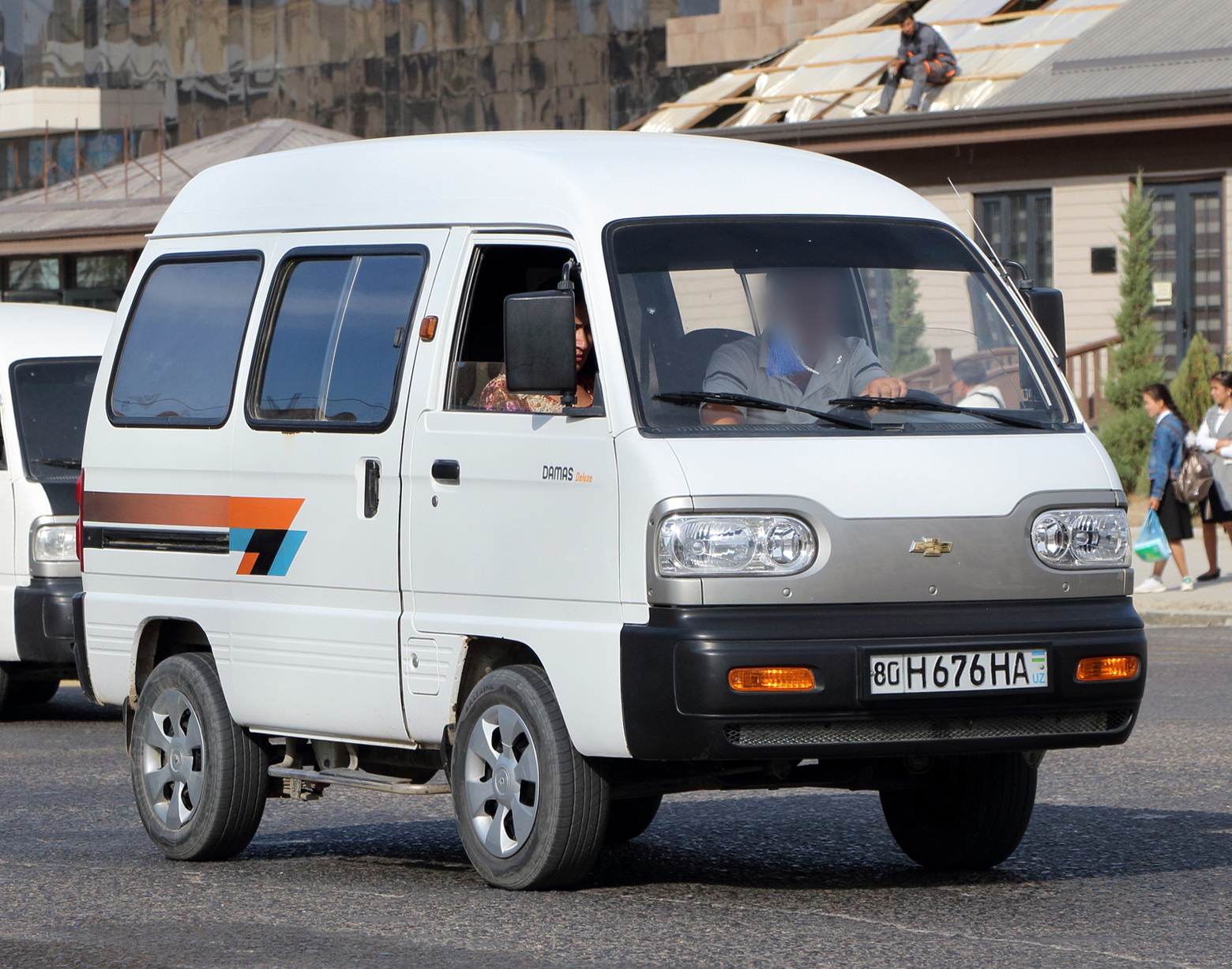
Chevrolet Damas

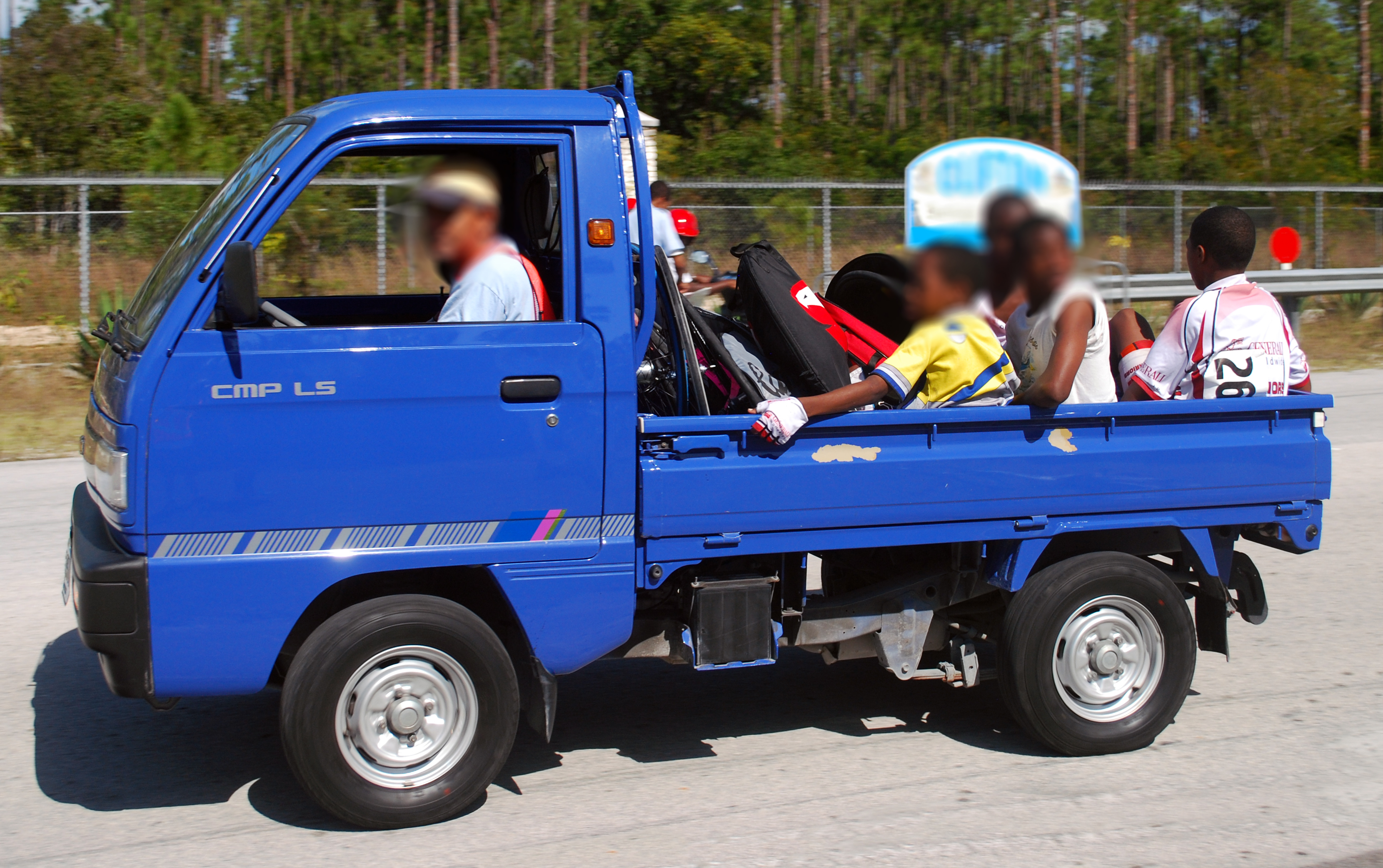
Chevrolet Labo

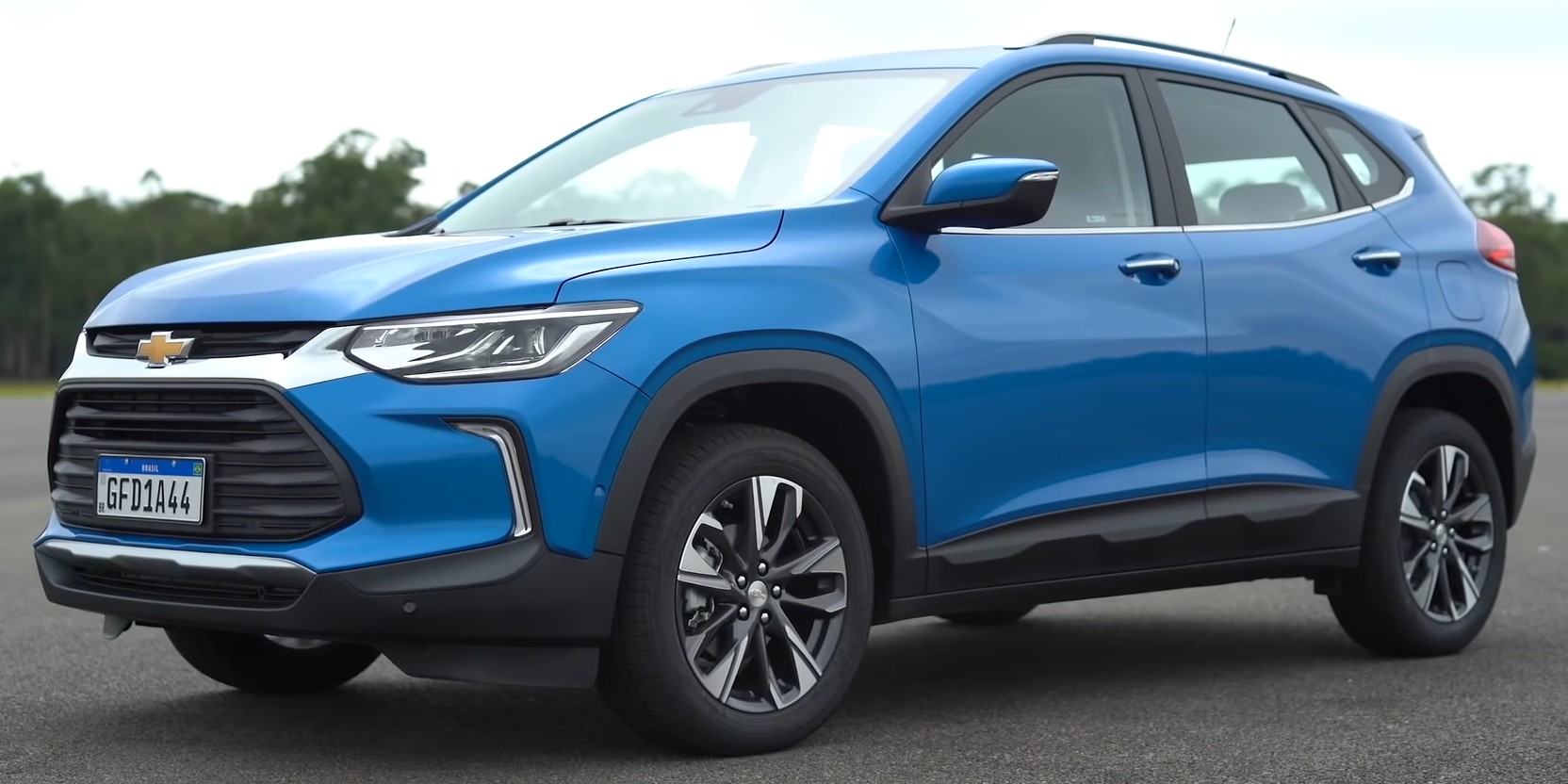
Chevrolet Tracker

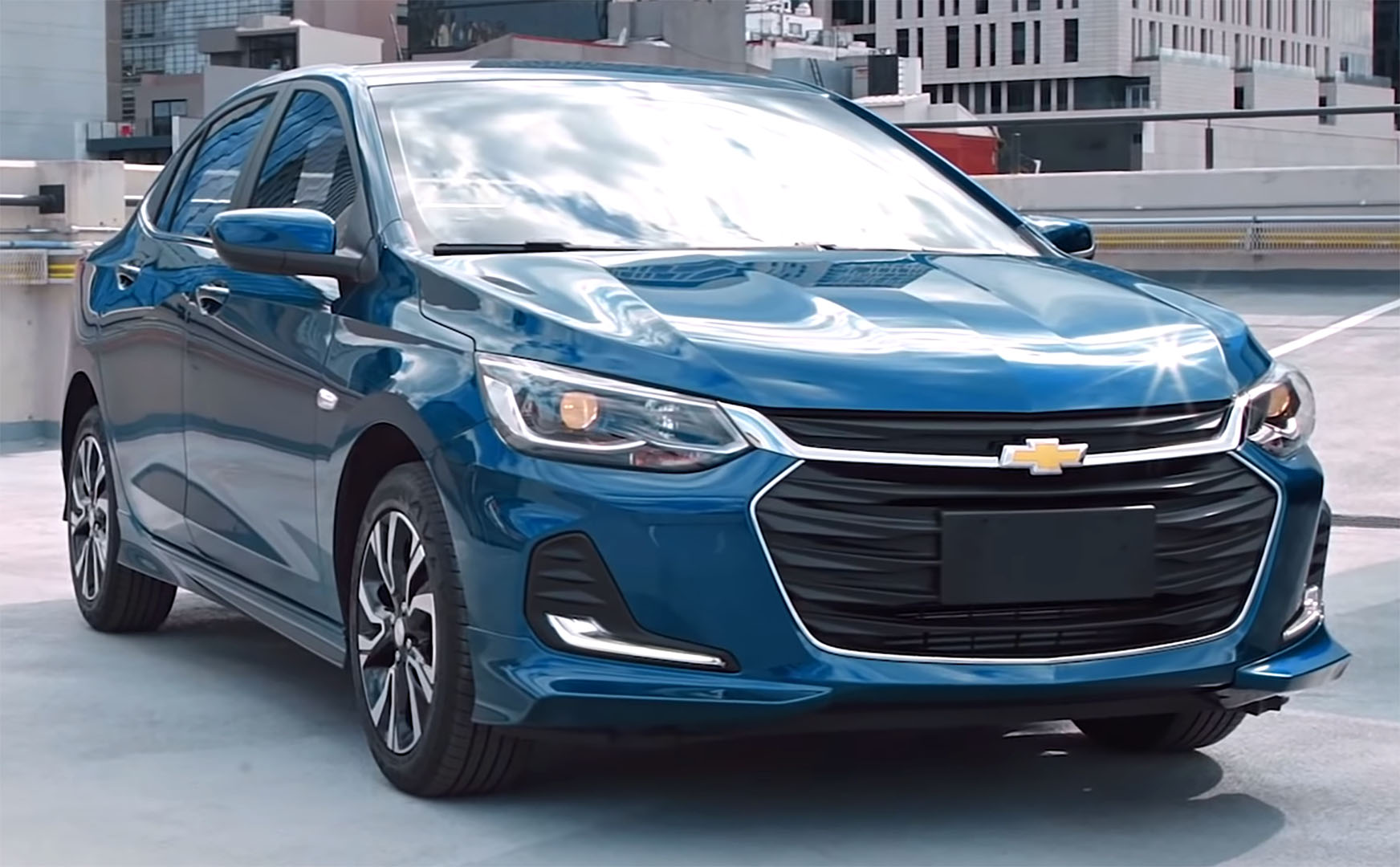
Chevrolet Onix

=== Discontinued models ===
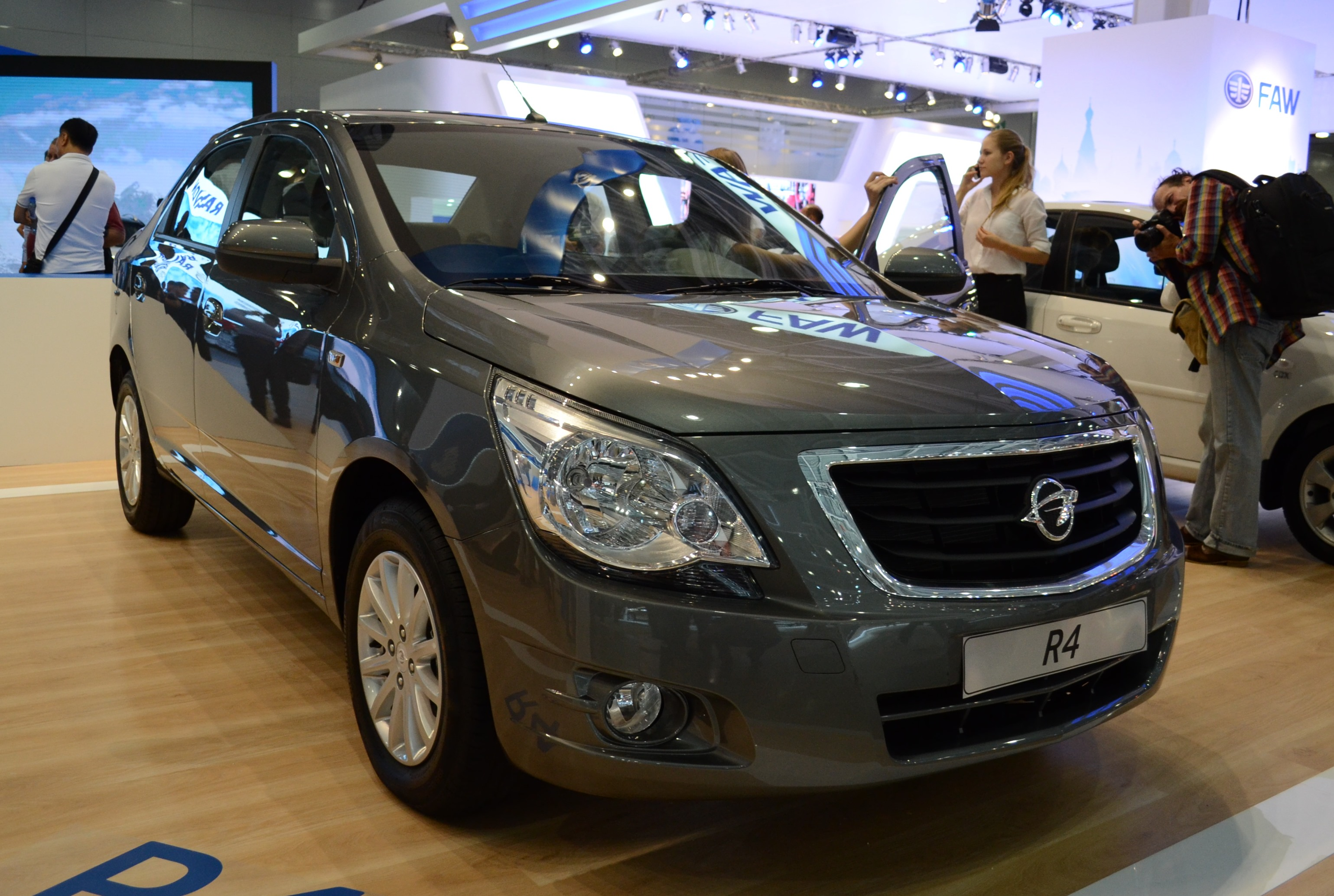
Ravon Cobalt R4 (2012-2020)

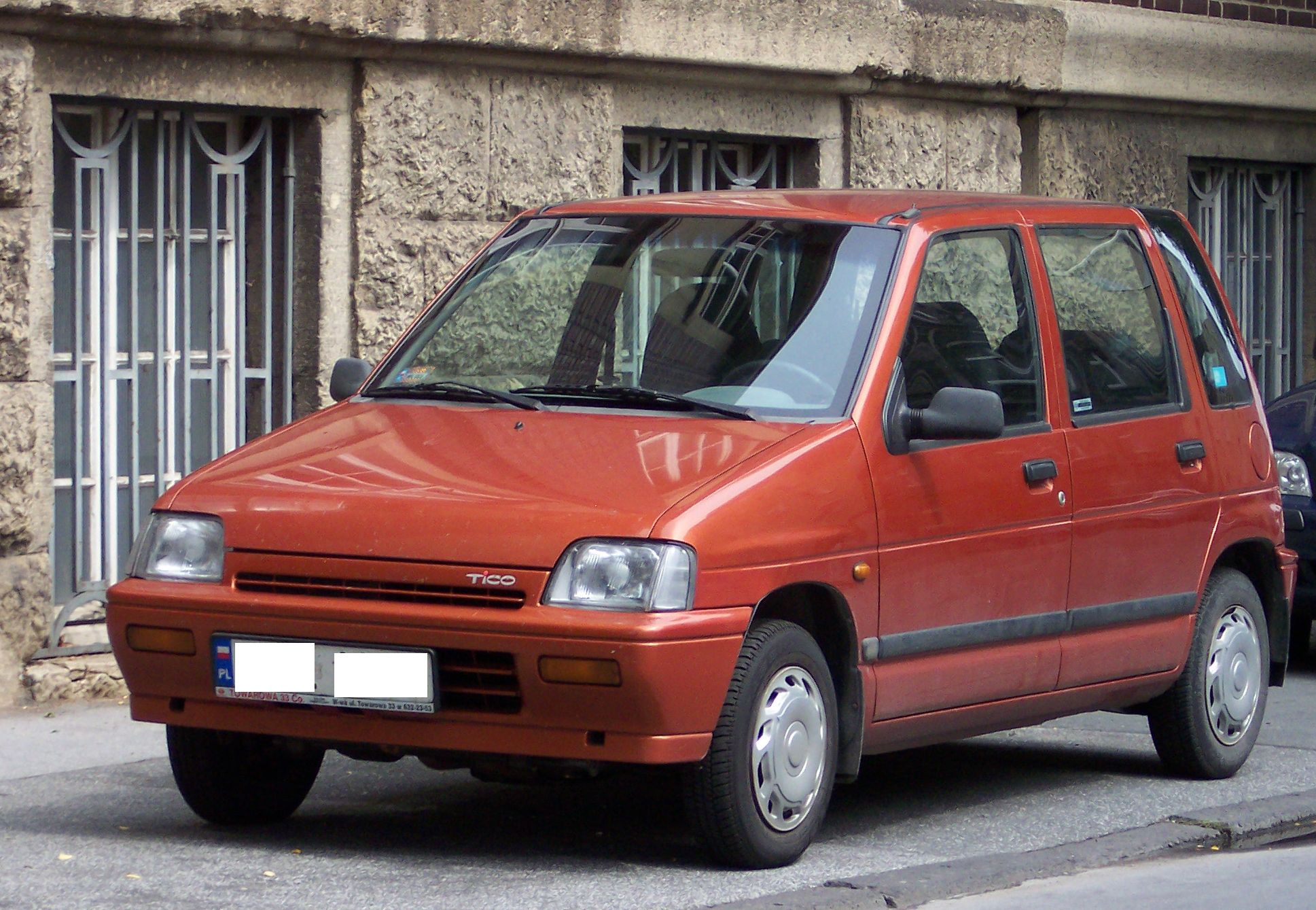
Daewoo Tico

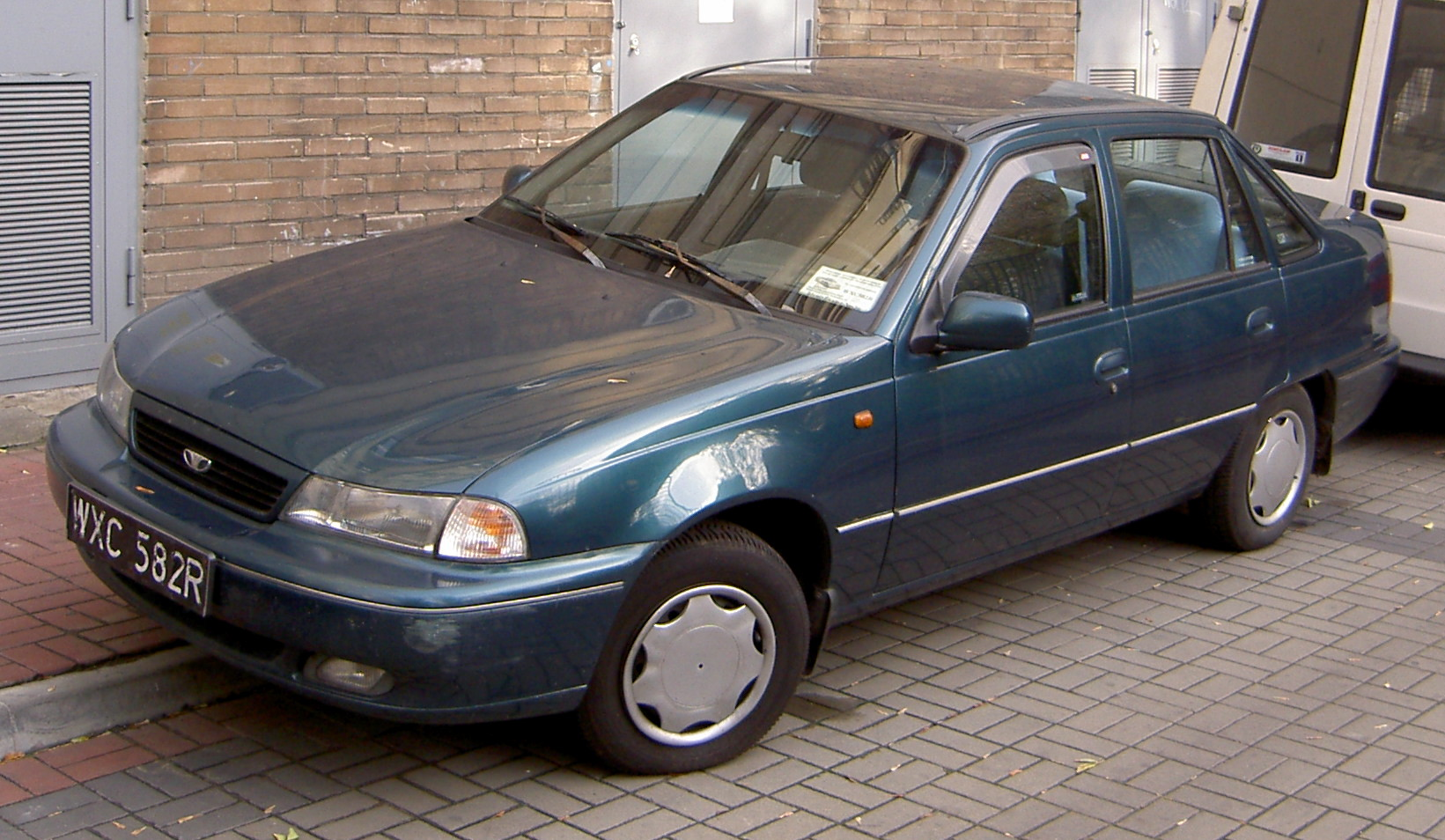
Daewoo Nexia 1, Daewoo Nexia 2

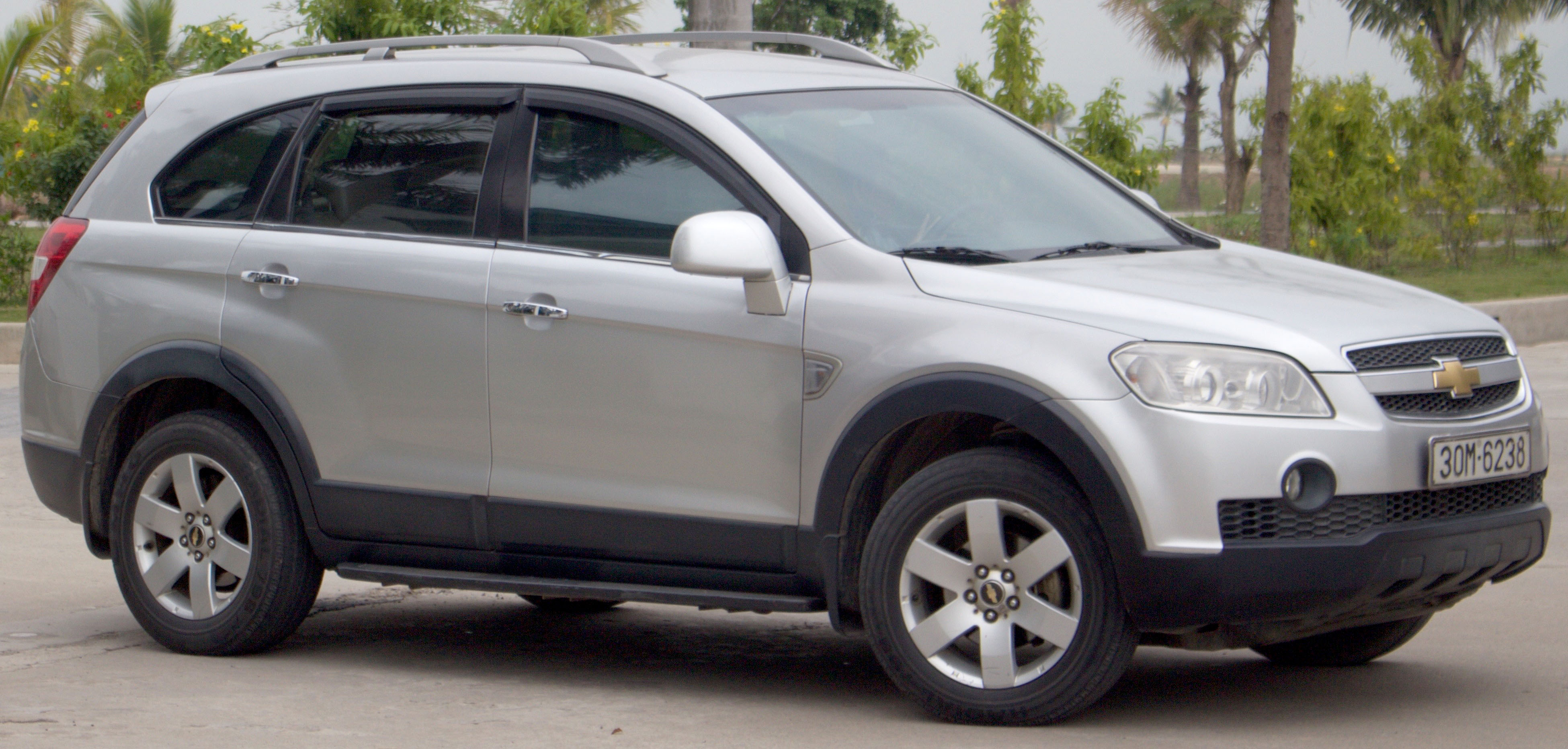
Chevrolet Captiva I

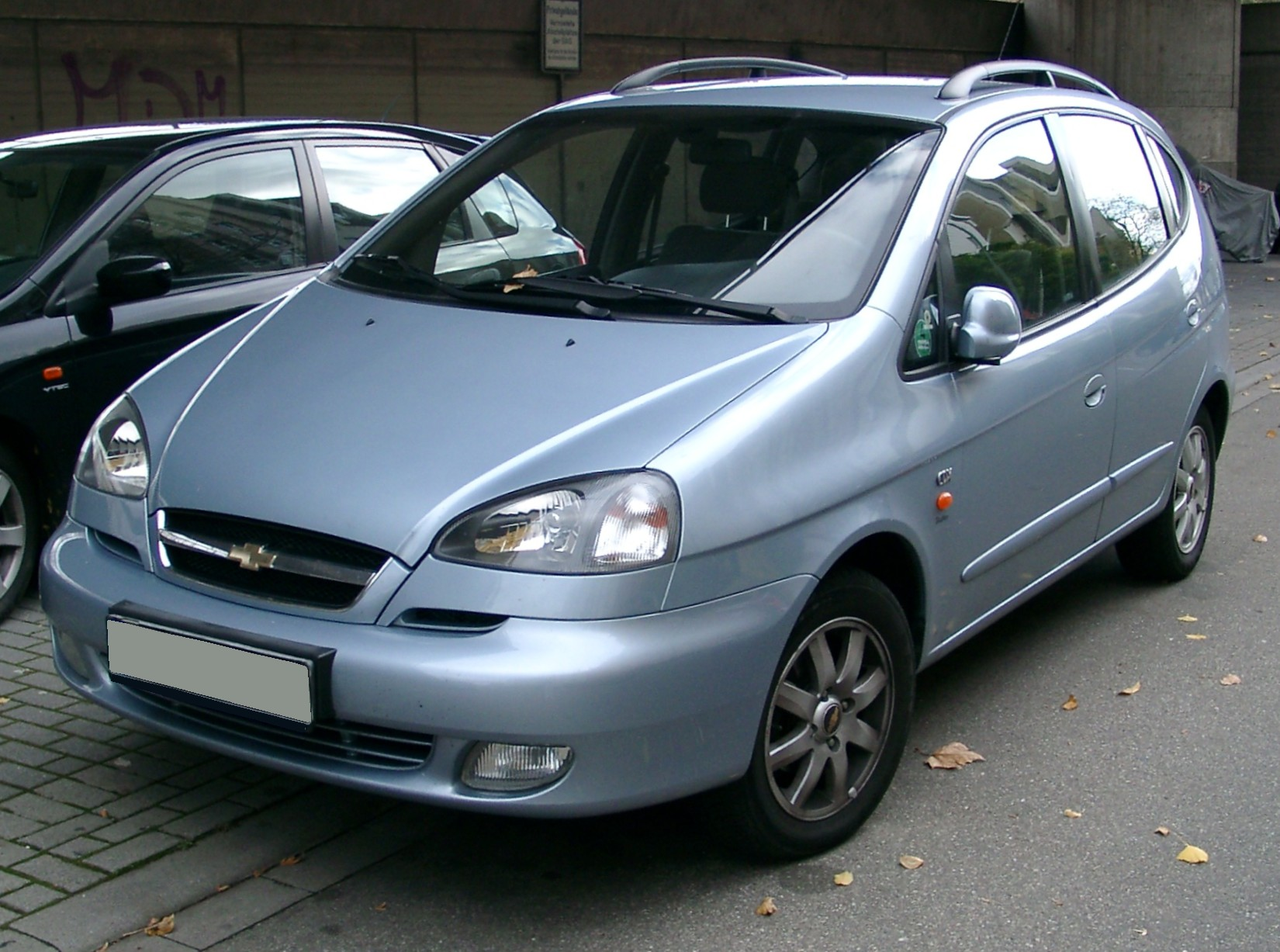
Chevrolet Tacuma

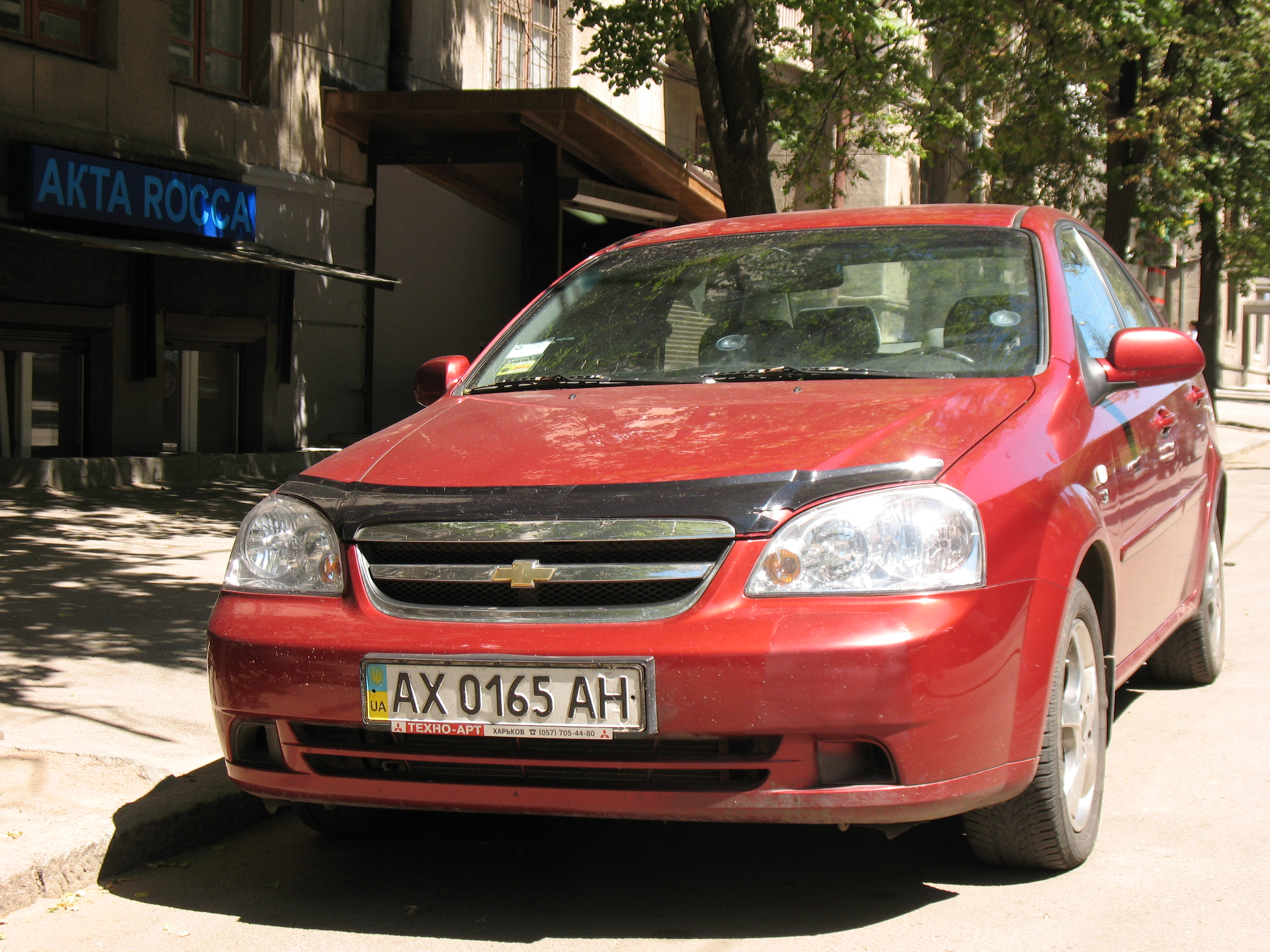
Chevrolet Lacetti

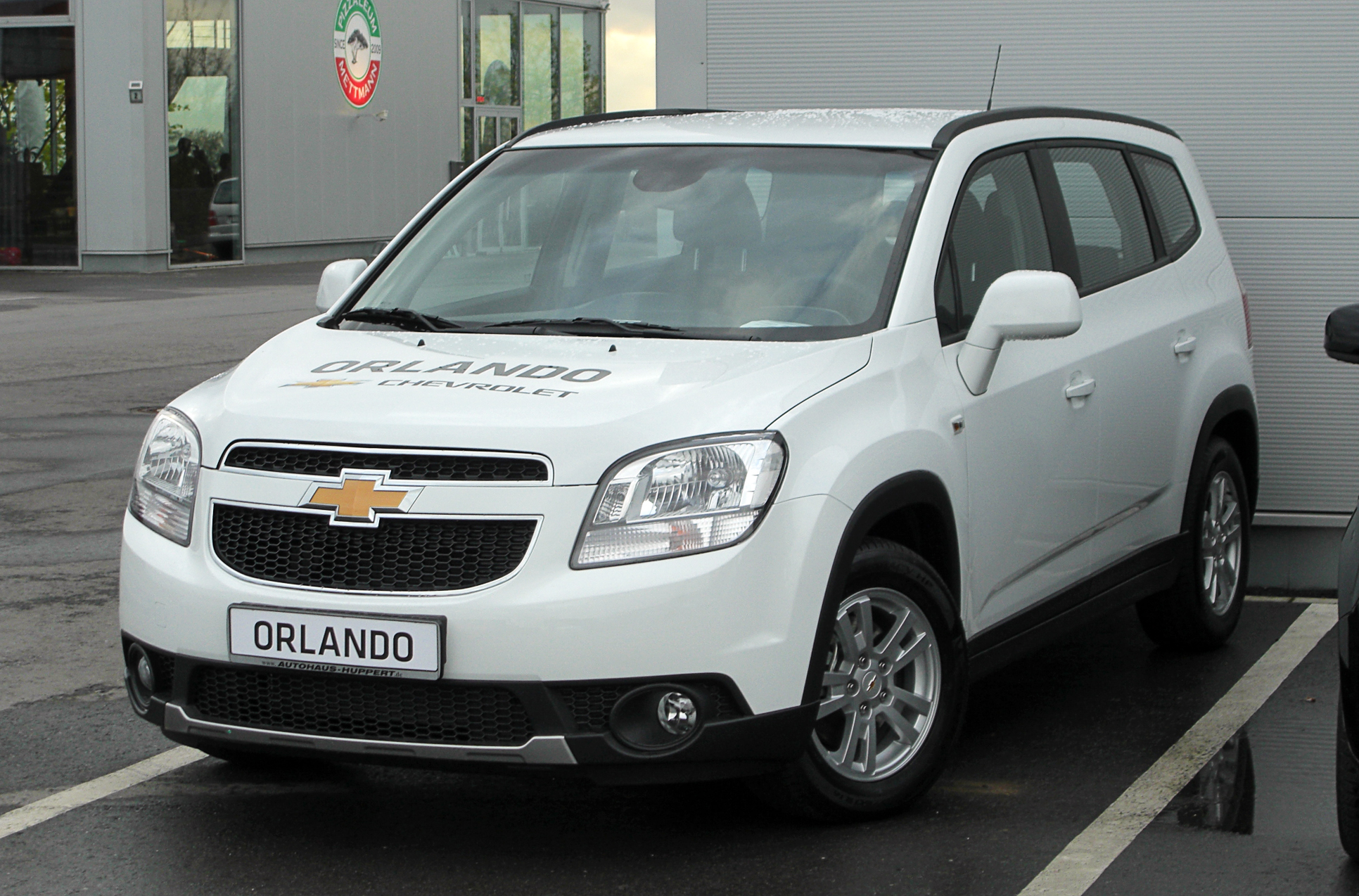
Chevrolet Orlando

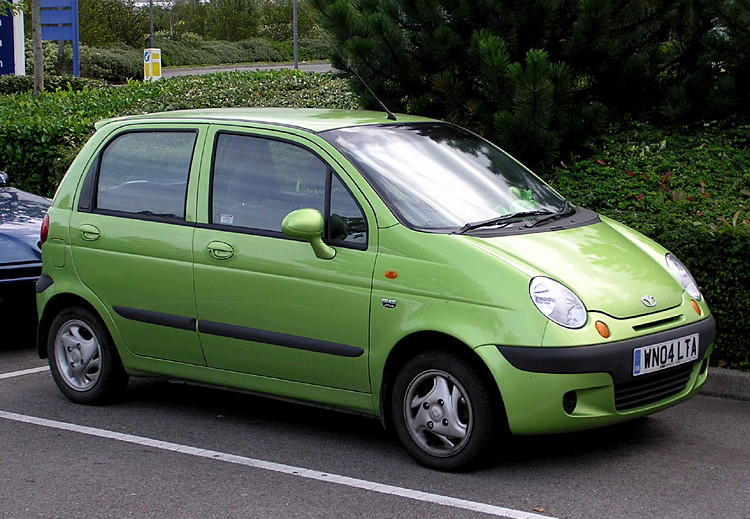
Ravon Matiz R1

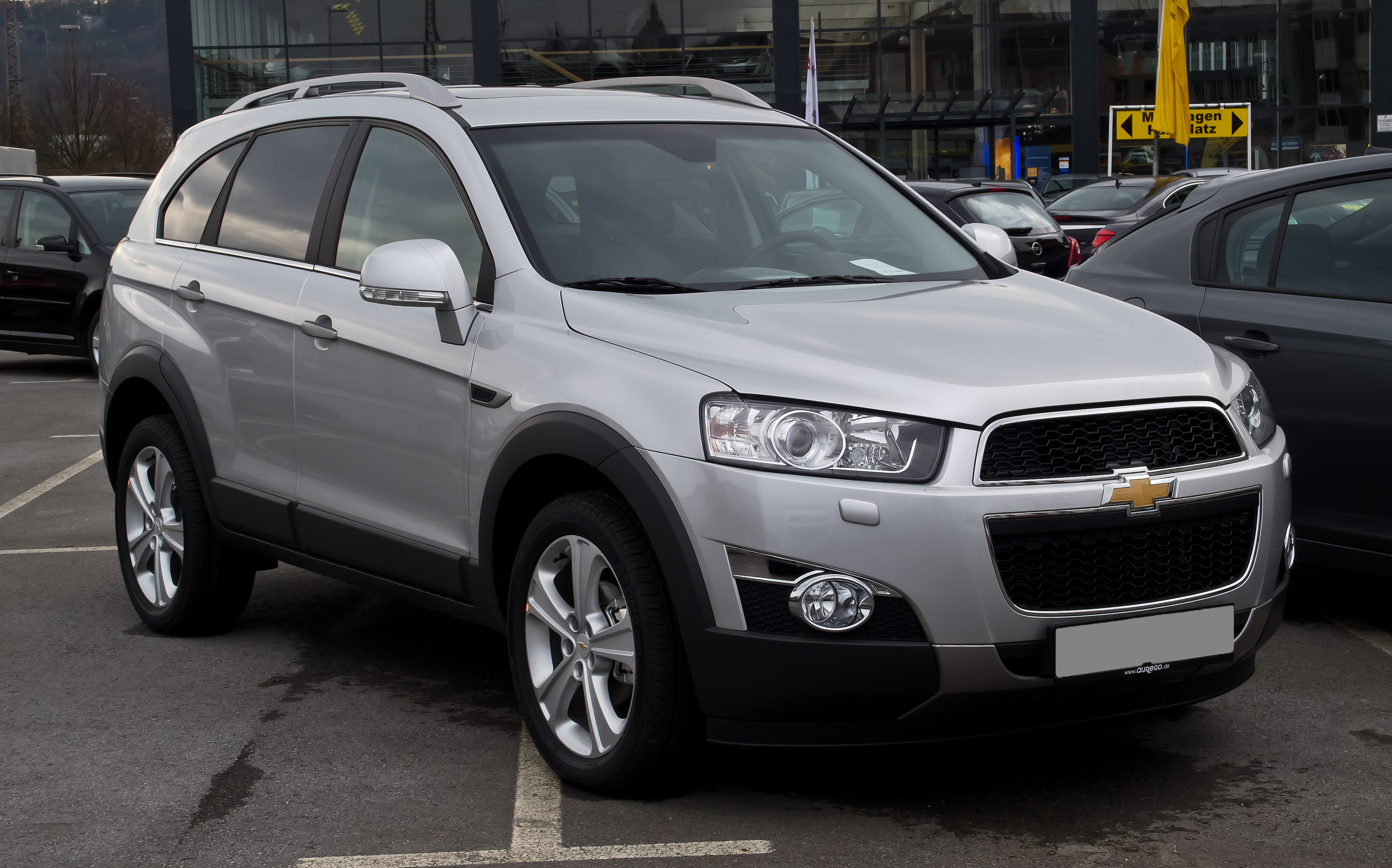
Chevrolet Captiva II

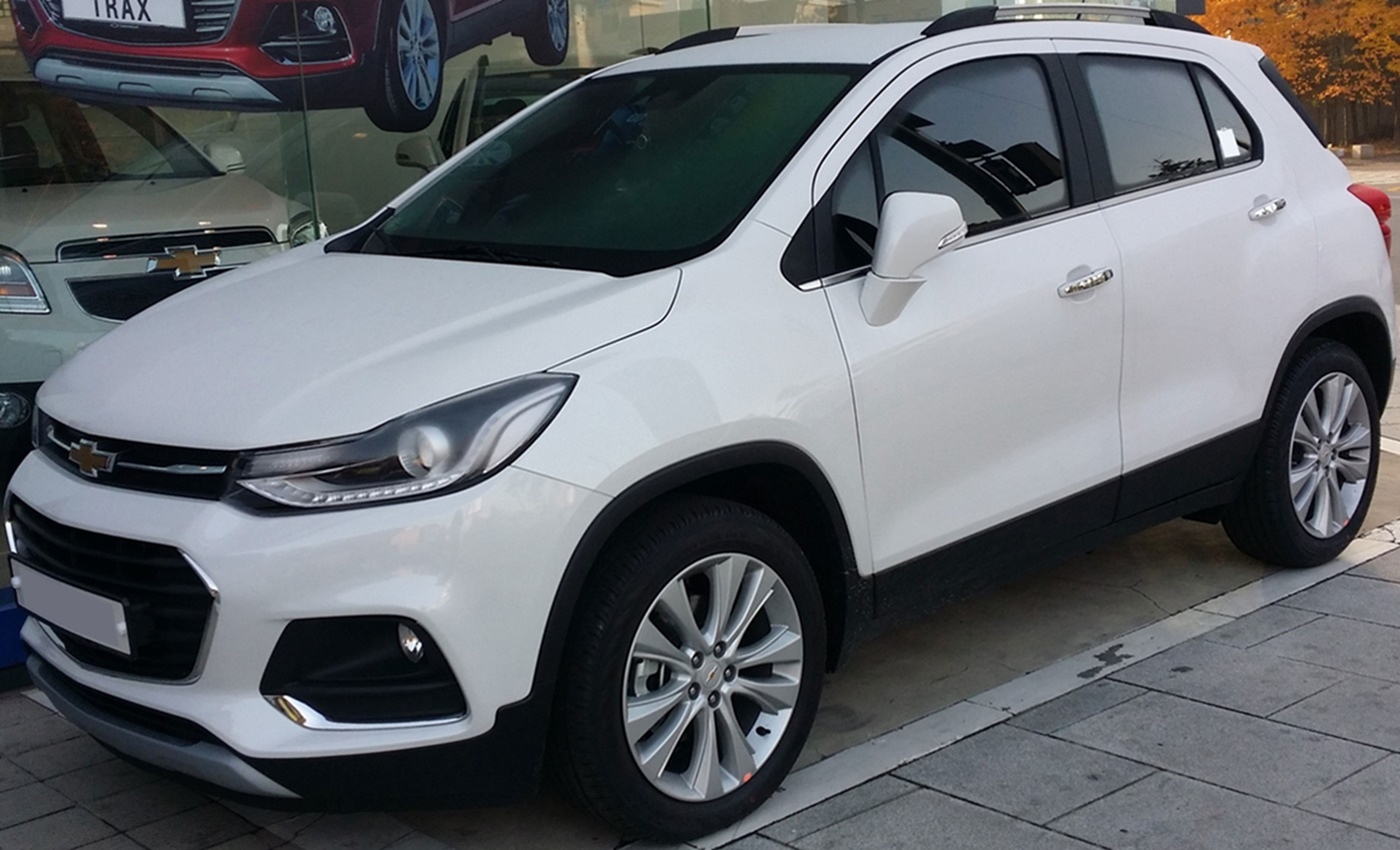
Chevrolet Tracker

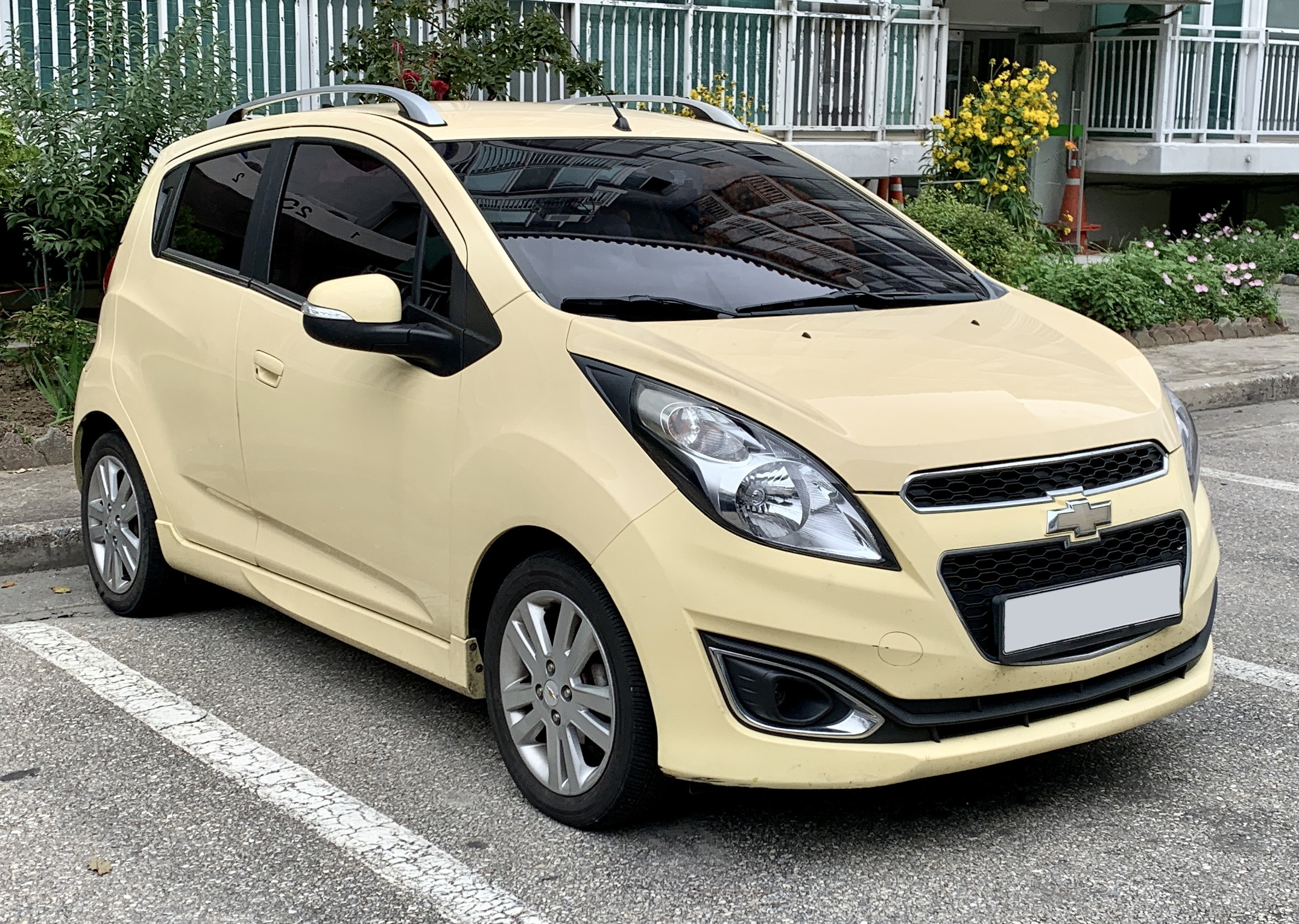
Chevrolet Spark (alternative name: Ravon R2)

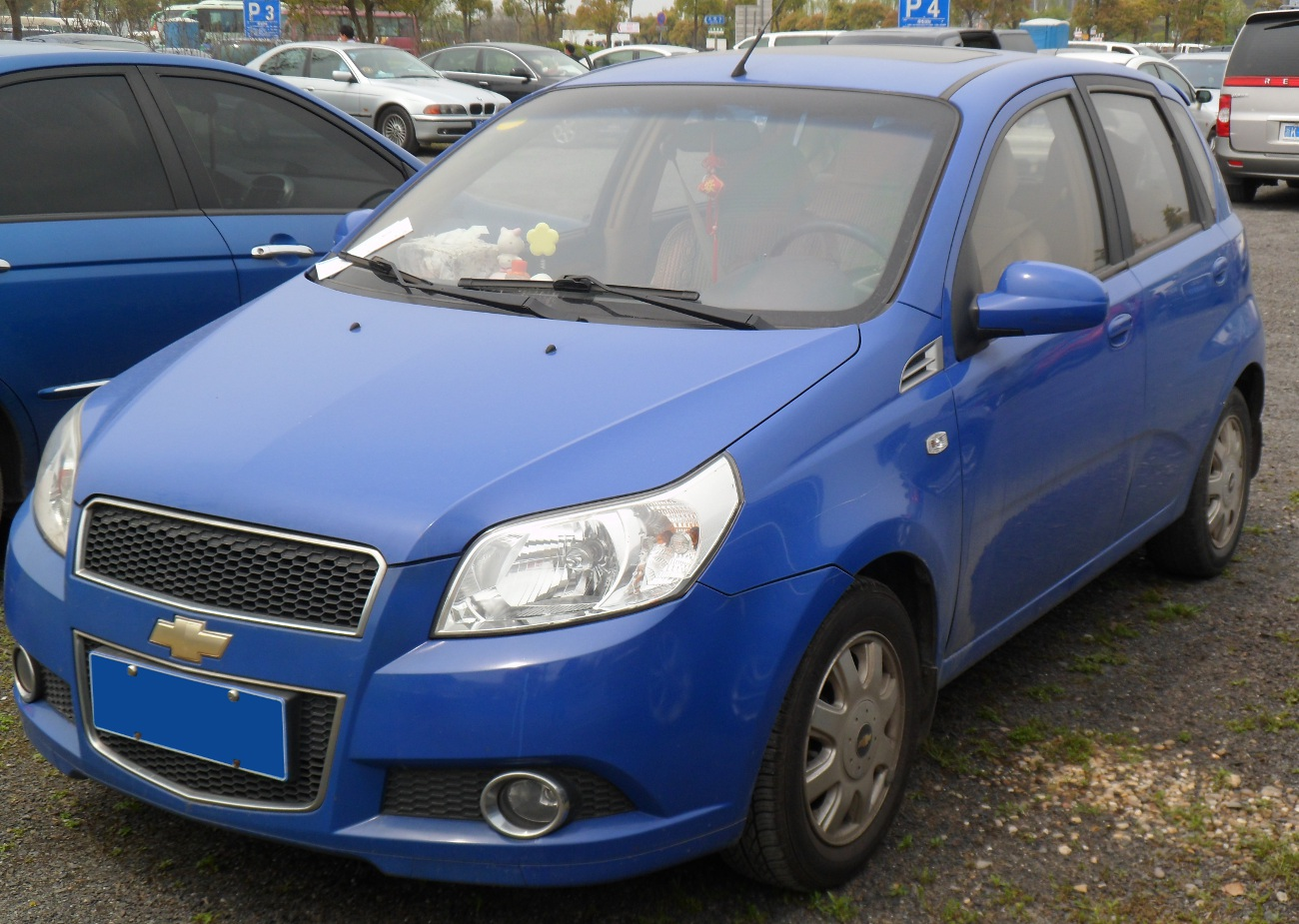
Ravon Nexia R3/Chevrolet Nexia 3
