= Buick GL6 =

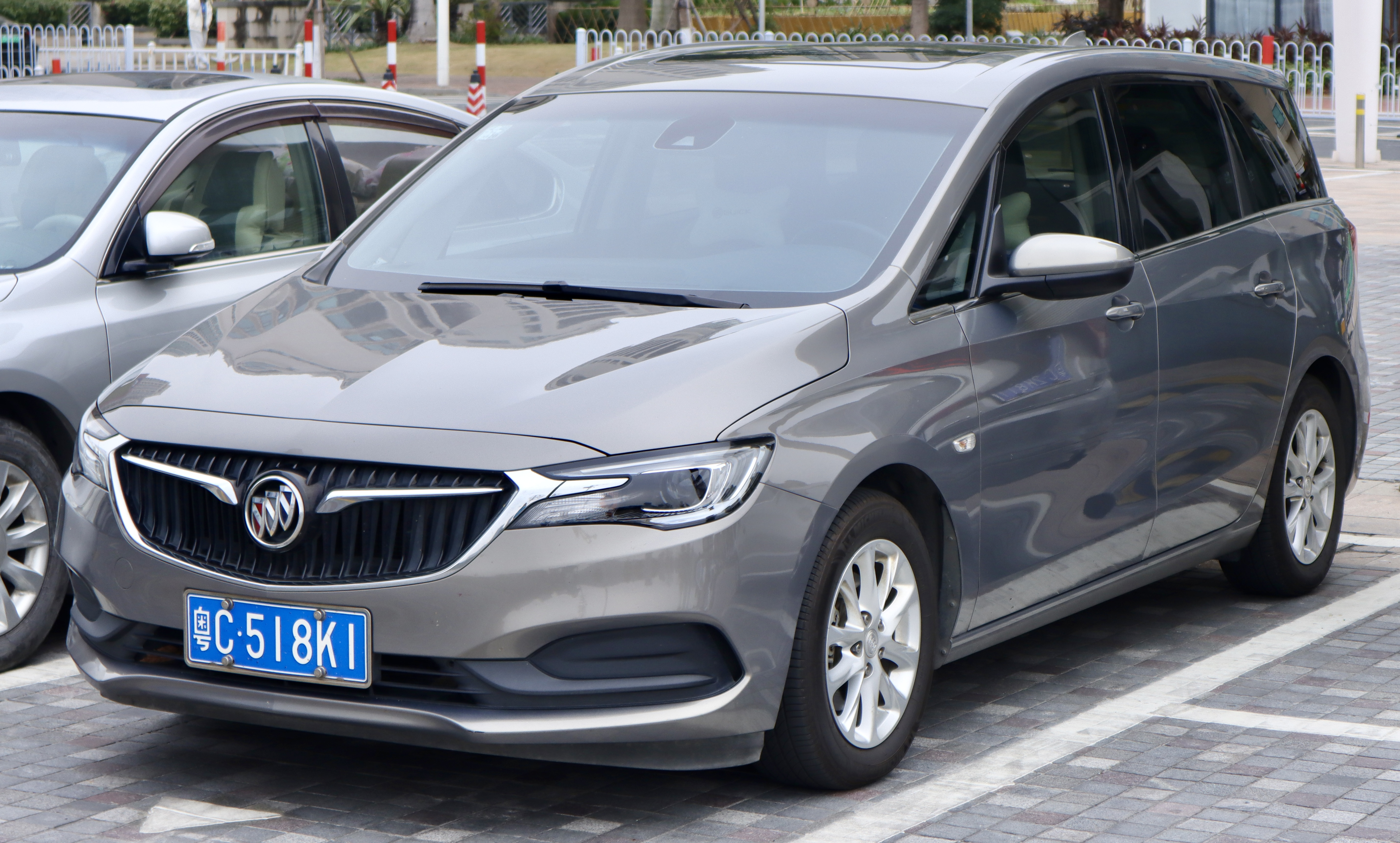

Overview
- Manufacturer: Shanghai GM
- Production: 2017–2023
- Model years: 2018–2023
- Assembly: China: Wuhan, Hubei (SAIC-GM)

Body and chassis
- Body style: 5-door minivan
- Platform: GM-PATAC K
- Related: Chevrolet Orlando; Buick Excelle GT; Chevrolet Monza (China)

Powertrain
- Engine: 1.3 L LI6 I3 (turbo petrol)
- Transmission: 6-speed automatic

Dimensions
- Wheelbase: 110 in (2,796 mm)
- Length: 185 in (4,692 mm)
- Width: 71 in (1,794 mm)
- Height: 64 in (1,626 mm)

The Buick GL6 is a 6-seater compact MPV produced by Buick exclusively for the Chinese market. The GL6 is positioned below the successful GL8 to aim for the lower-priced MPV market. Pricing starts around $25,000 (estimate in U.S. dollars, converted from Chinese yuan). As of July 2023, the GL6 is no longer listed on Buick China's website.

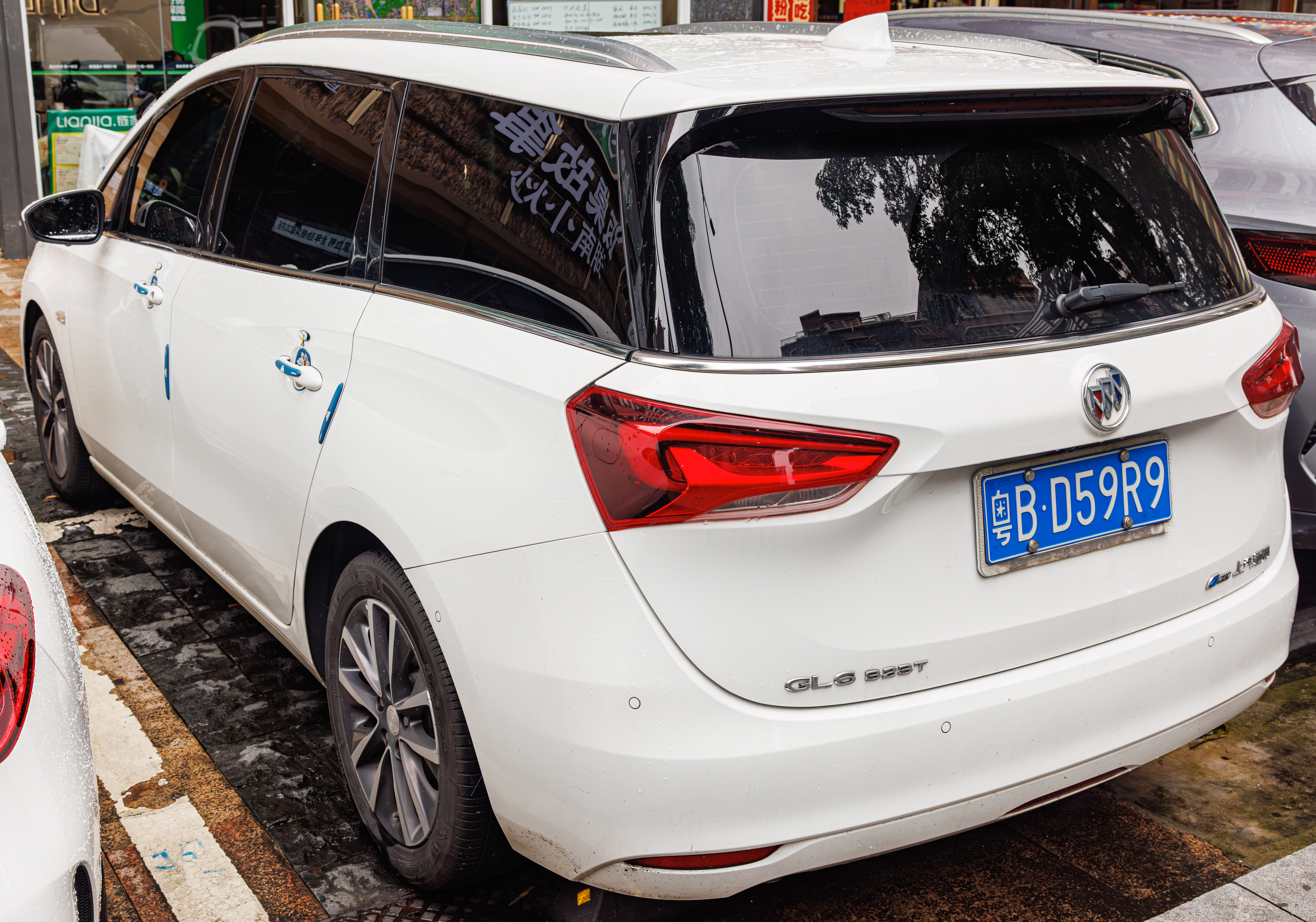
Buick GL6 rear
