= Tashkent Stock Exchange =

Stock exchange in Uzbekistan

Tashkent Stock Exchange (RSE)
- Uzbek: Toshkent Respublika fond birjasi
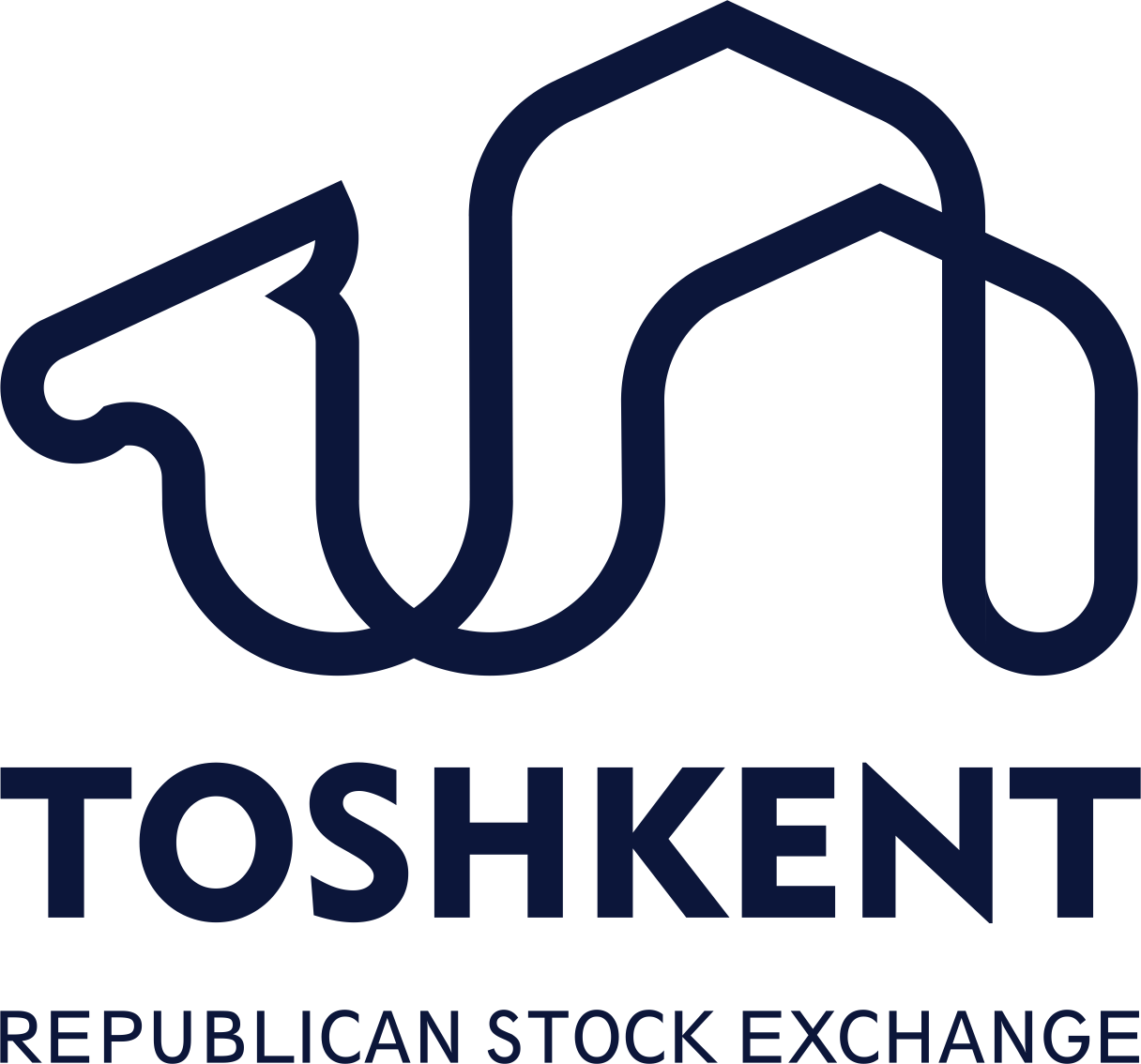
- Type: Stock exchange
- Location: Tashkent city, Tashkent Region, Uzbekistan
- Founded: April 8, 1994; 32 years ago
- Owner: Government 75% + 1 share, KRX 25% - 1 share
- Key people: George Paresishvili (CEO, since Sep 2022)
- Currency: Uzbekistani soum
- No. of listings: 107 as of 20.02.2024
- Indices: UCI
- Website: uzse.uz

Tashkent Stock Exchange, officially The republican stock exchange "Toshkent" (RSE) (Uzbek: Toshkent Respublika fond birjasi) is the only stocks and corporate bonds trading platform (as the exchange and OTC) in Uzbekistan. It was founded by the government in 1994 as an open joint stock company, located in Tashkent, the capital of Uzbekistan.

== Overview ==
RSE had a license for the exchange activity given by the State Committee of Competition and regulated under the Laws of Uzbekistan on exchanges (1992), on joint stock companies (1996), on securities market (2008) as well as a number of under-law legal acts of government and securities commission.

In October 2019, the Capital Market Development Agency of the Republic of Uzbekistan (CMDA was created in 2019 and liquidated in 2021) reissued the license for the RSE.

According to presidential decree dated March 19, 2012 Korea Exchange (KRX) became a shareholder of RSE in 2016 by acquiring 25 percent in the equity capital in exchange for the provision of a Unified IT complex. .

Meantime, shareholders of RSE are only state (SAMA) with 75 percent plus 1 unit of stock and KRX. 4 state-owned commercial banks (Asakabank, Xalqbank, SQB and NBU) that became shareholders of the Exchange in 2012-2013 transferred their shares on the Exchange to the state in accordance with the decree of the President of Uzbekistan dated 18.03.2022 No. PP-168 .

Historically, securities market of Uzbekistan formed due to the massive privatization in the 1990s of state owned enterprises after collapse of Soviet Union and gaining independence from Moscow. Unlike the Russian Federation, Uzbek government gradually privatized SOE, first reorganized them into joint stock companies and then selling only part of the shares in equity capital through stock exchange. As a result, there were no extremely wealthy business magnates so called "oligarchs" in Uzbekistan, while number of shareholders exceeded 1.2 million.

The RSE is a member of the Federation of Euro-Asian Stock Exchanges.

According to the Central securities depository under Central Bank of Uzbekistan, as of February 1st, 2024, government of Uzbekistan keeps controlling shareholder power at 157 industrial enterprises in the form of joint stock company (JSC). In total, out of 627 JSCs in Uzbekistan, the state directly owns shares in 244 JSCs (84,7% of all issued stocks, in terms of their nominal value), and state holdings (officially called “Economic Management Bodies”) own shares in 132 JSCs..

Starting from September 2023 the capital market in Uzbekistan is regulated by the National Agency of Perspective Projects (NAPP) of the Republic of Uzbekistan, which is a state body responsible for regulation, licensing, and permitting procedures in the sphere of crypto-assets turnover, capital market, insurance, e-commerce, lotteries and gambling activities. .

There is also an SRO of professional participants of the uzbek capital market - National Association of Investment Institutions (NAII), established in January 2021.
