= TagAZ =

Automotive assembly plant in Russia

Taganrog Automobile Factory
- Industry: Automotive
- Founded: 1997
- Defunct: 2014
- Headquarters: Taganrog, Rostov Oblast, Russia
- Key people: M. Y. Paramonov, CEO of the financial-industrial group Doninvest
- Products: Automobiles and commercial vehicles
- Owner: Doninvest
- Number of employees: 8,500
- Website: tagaz.ru

TagAZ (Russian: ТагАЗ, Таганрогский автомобильный завод, romanized: Taganrogskiy Avtomobilnyi Zavod, lit. 'Taganrog Automobile Factory') was an automotive assembly plant located in Taganrog, Russia. An affiliated enterprise is the Rostov Truck Factory.

On January 21, 2014, the company was declared bankrupt.

== History ==
Construction of the Taganrog Automotive Plant began in spring 1997, under license and technology of South Korean Daewoo Motors, and was fully financed by Doninvest Finance & Industry Group, with investment volumes surpassing US$260 million. In 1998, Doninvest launched pilot semi-knocked-down production of the Daewoo Lanos and Daewoo Nubira models.

From 1999 to 2002, the company assembled the Citroën Berlingo Mk I model under the name Orion M.

In 2001, it started producing the Hyundai Accent (LC), followed in 2004 by the Hyundai Sonata (EF), in 2008 by the Hyundai Elantra (XD), and in 2005 by the Hyundai Porter (third generation) light truck. In 2008, it started production of the Hyundai Santa Fe (SM). In the spring of 2012, production of the Hyundai models was over.

In 2008, it began assembly from semi-knocked-down kits of the Vortex Estina (a rebadged Chery A5).

In 2010, TagAZ announced the construction of a third automotive manufacturing plant in Bangladesh, with an initial $2 billion investment. According to TagAZ officials, the decision to build cars in Bangladesh was made because of its low labour costs and the export advantages it enjoys with neighbouring countries and Europe. TagAZ had already purchased land in the Kishoreganj District and aimed to sell the first car assembled there by 2012.

In October 2010, TagAZ started assembling the BYD F3, Vortex Corda (a modified Chery Amulet), and Vortex Tingo (modified Chery Tiggo) models.

In June 2011, the company began assembly from complete-knocked-down kits of the Tagaz C10 (a rebadged version of the JAC Tojoy). In October 2011, the Tagaz C190 (a rebadged version of the JAC Rein) was added to the line-up.

At one point, the company reached the capacity to simultaneously produce up to 20 different models at its facilities.

== Owners and executives ==
TagAZ's owner was Russian entrepreneur M. Y. Paramonov, CEO of the financial-industrial Doninvest group. One-fifth of TagAZ shares were held by Sapor Invest Inc., Ikaria International Technologies Aktiengesellschaft, Pemberton Establishment, Asha Holding, and Dl Technologies GmbH.

== Production capacity ==
The TagAZ factory at Taganrog covers an area of 60,000 m^{2} and is divided into 5 departments:

- Welding body shop
- Paint shop
- Assembly shop (4 lines)
- Electroplating shop
- Functional testing shop

The conveyor line is laid out vertically over four floors of the main plant building, with a network of elevators and lifts linking the different levels. Each level is equipped with a monorail as well as compact lifting and transporting equipment.

All completed vehicles undergo a road test on a track made up of varied road surfaces.

== Performance ==
The current yearly production regime is 180,000 units of six different vehicle models.

Year	1999	2000	2003 (Note: For 9 months.)	2004	2005	2006	2007	2008	2009
Production	586	298	3,810	25,602	45,417	55,900	79,620	106,322	29,240

== Model lineup ==
=== TagAZ-owned brands ===
Over its lifetime TagAZ used three different brands:

==== Doninvest ====
Under the brand Doninvest (licensed copies of Daewoo )

- Doninvest Kondor (Daewoo Leganza)
- Doninvest Orion (Daewoo Nubira)
- Doninvest Assol (Daewoo Lanos)
- Doninvest Aksaj Dozor (buggy based on Lada Niva)

==== Vortex ====
Vortex (rebadged Chery)

- Vortex Estina, rebadged from the Chery A5
- Vortex Estina FL-C, rebadged from the Chery E5
- Vortex Corda, rebadged from the Chery Amulet
- Vortex Tingo, rebadged from the Chery Tiggo
Vortex logo

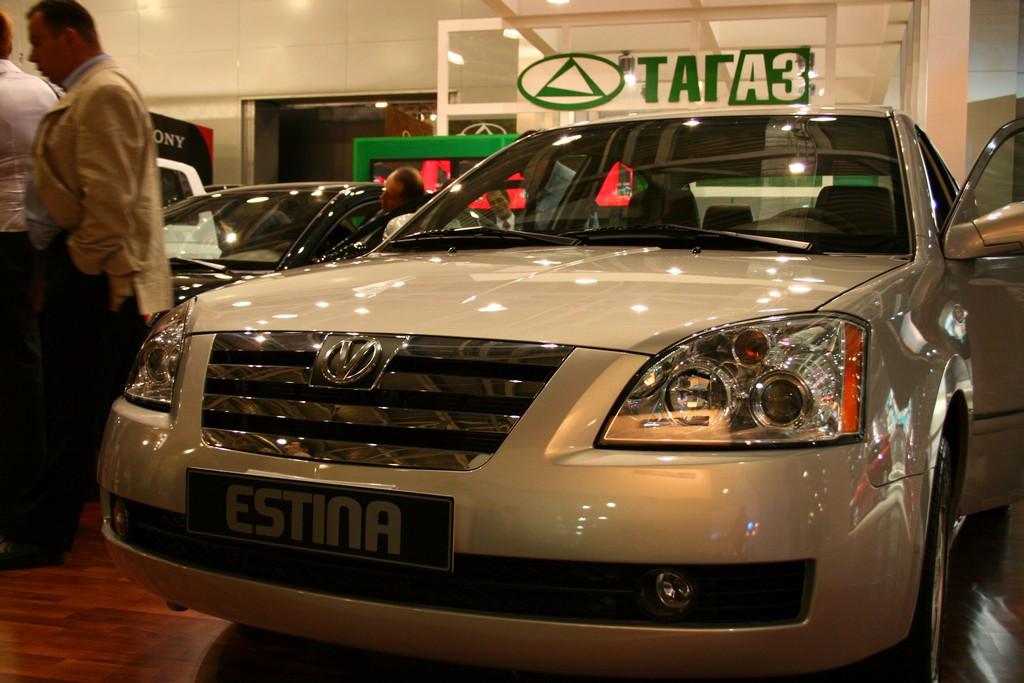
Chery A5 aka Vortex Estina.

==== TagAZ ====
TagAZ

- TagAZ Tager, rebadged from the SsangYong Korando
- TagAZ Road Partner, rebadged from the SsangYong Musso
- TagAZ C10, rebadged from the JAC Tojoy
- TagAZ C190, rebadged from the JAC Rein
- TagAZ Aquila
- 2009–2012 TagAZ Vega – this claimed own development was accused of being a copy of the Chevrolet Lacetti; as a result TagAZ lost the rights to export the Vega and their joint venture with Ssangyong was dissolved
- TagAZ Master
- TagAZ Hardy light truck
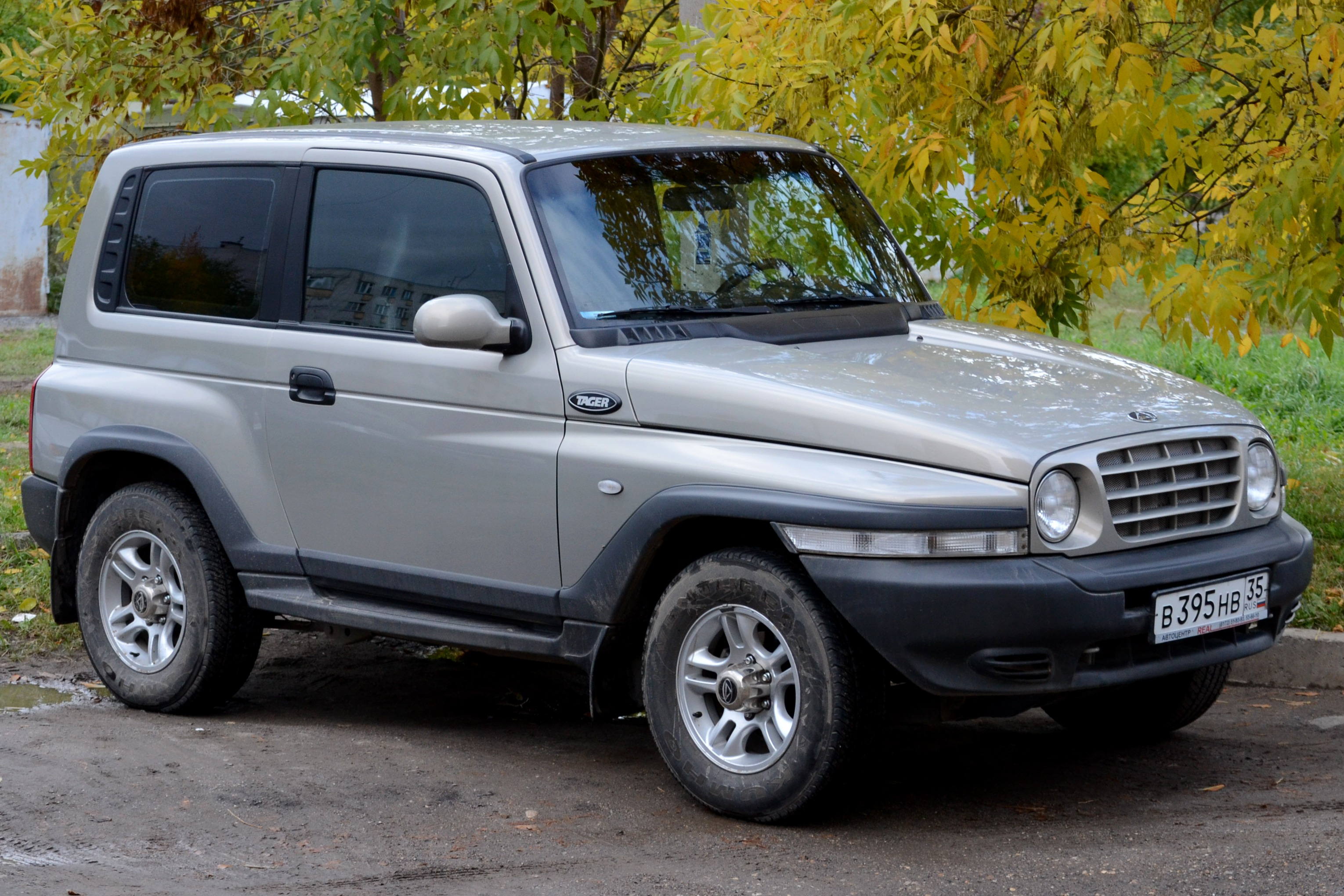
TagAZ Tager 3 door

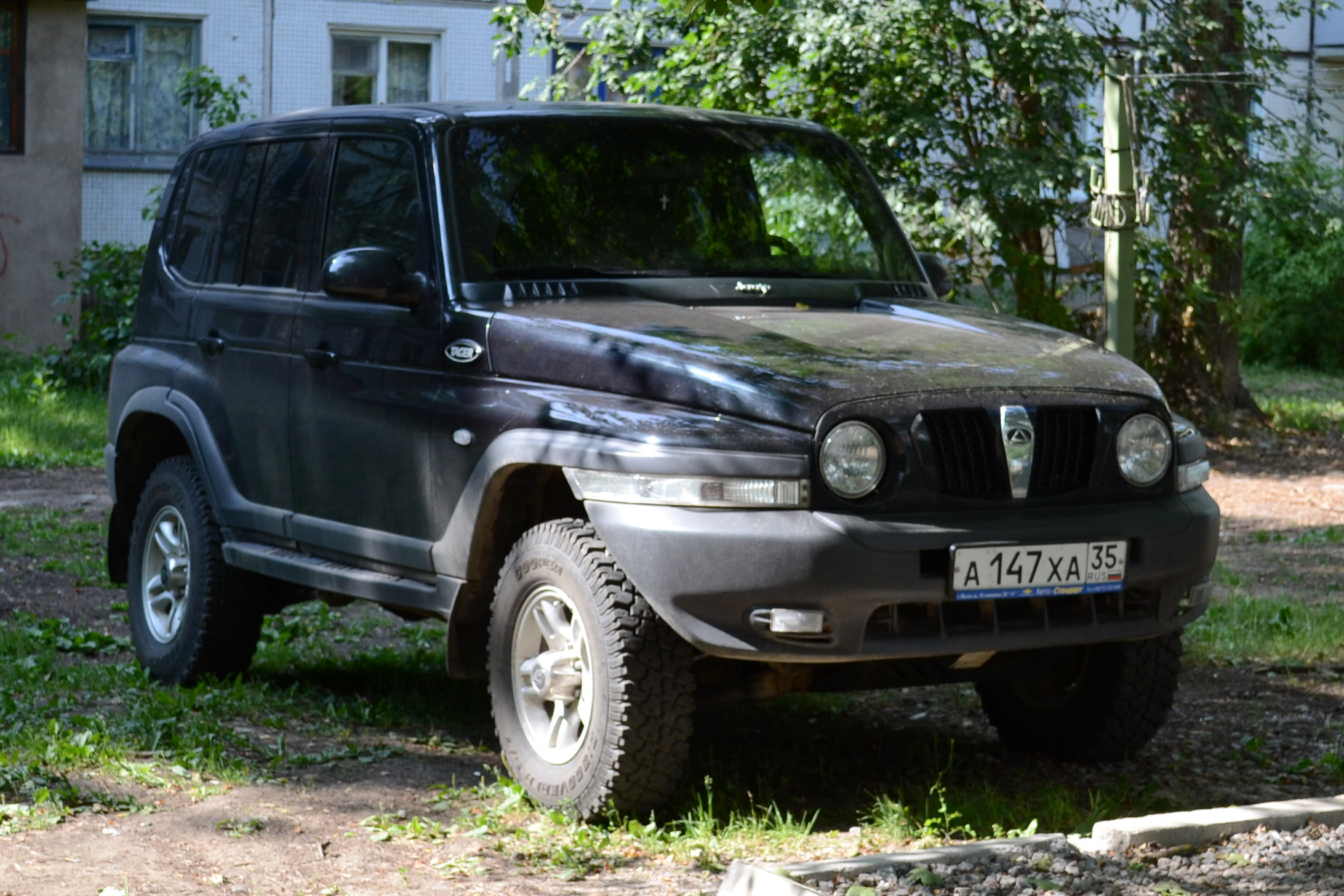
TagAZ Tager 5 door

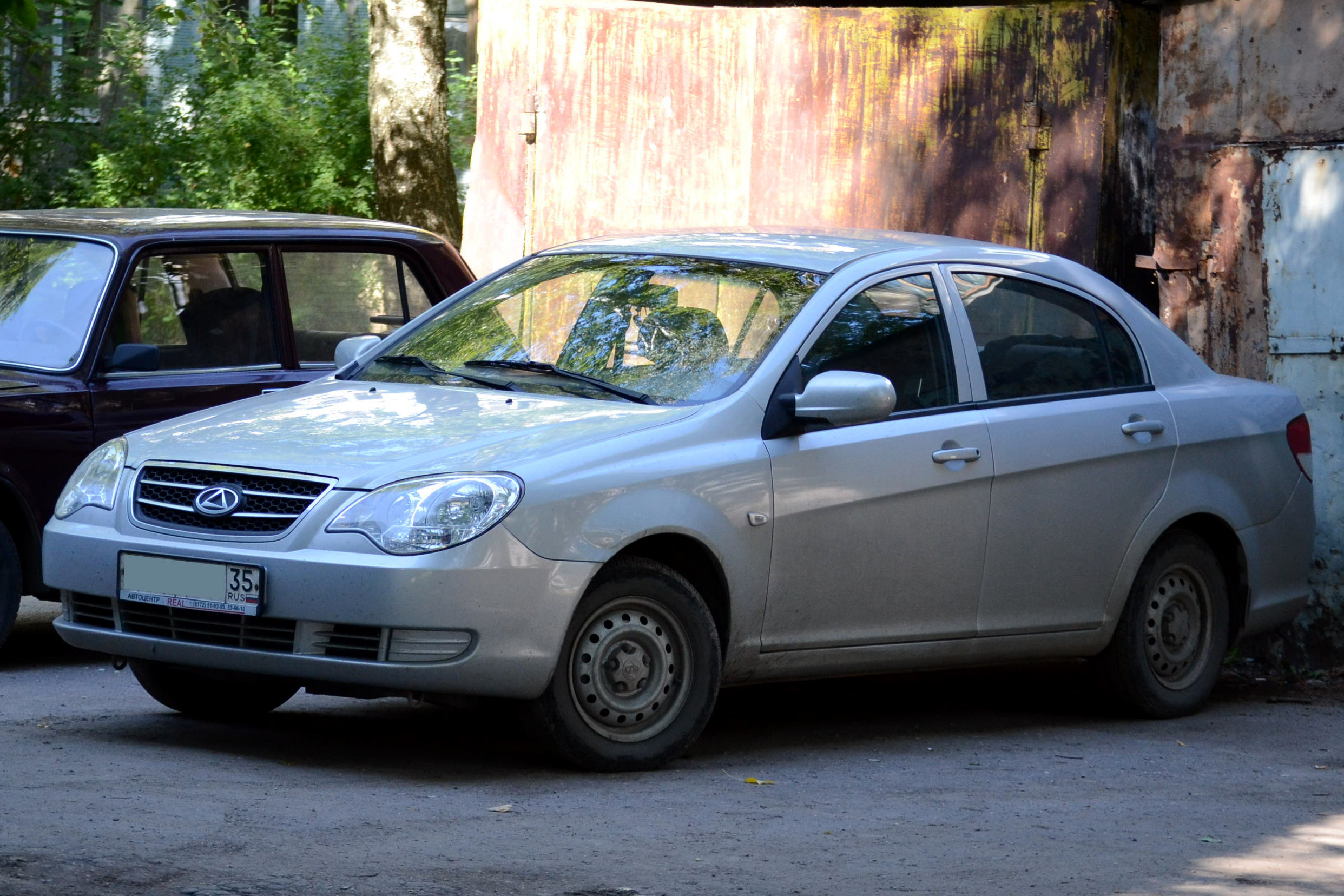
TagAZ Vega

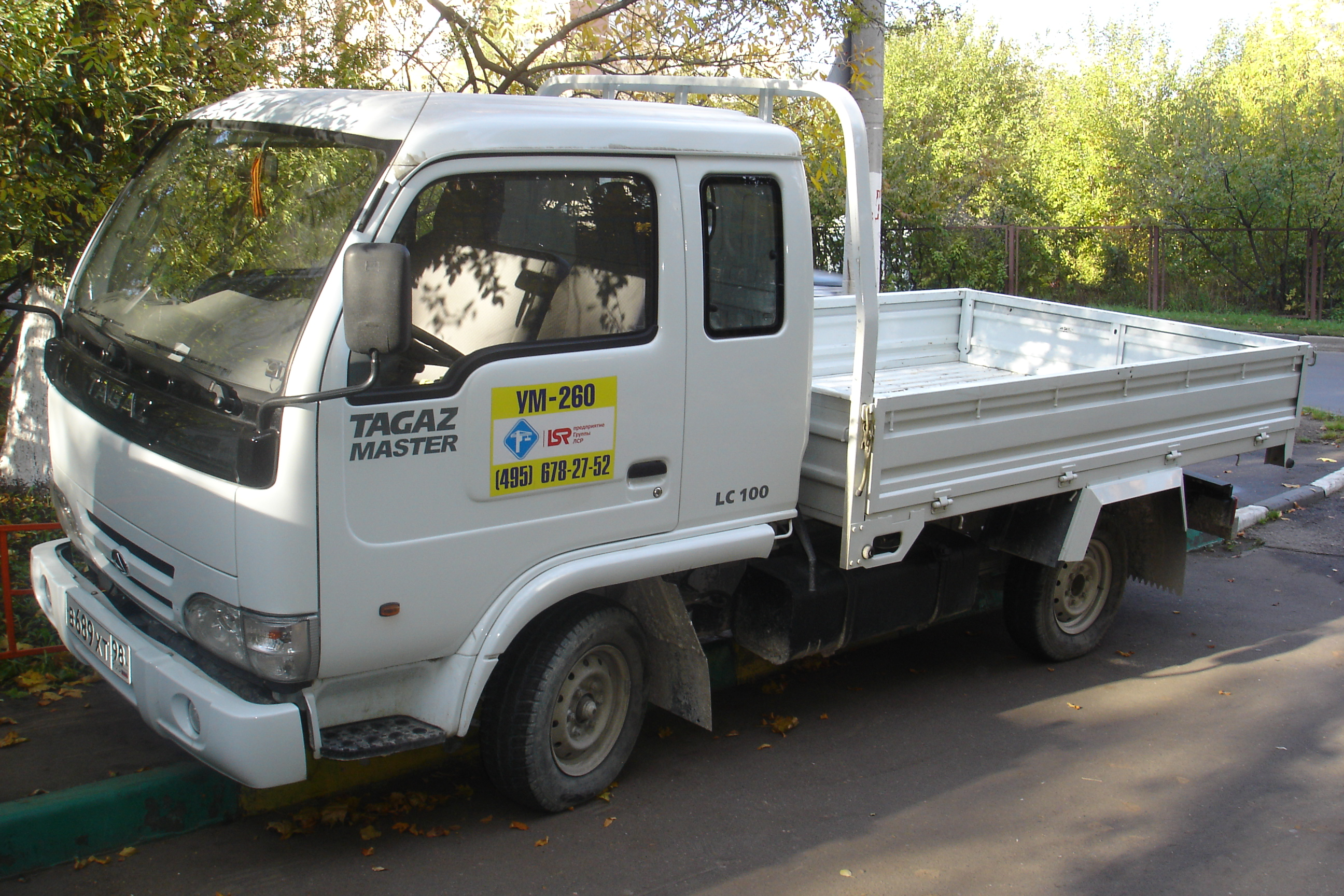
TagAZ Master

=== TagAZ produced foreign brands ===
TagAZ assembled the following foreign brands from knock-down kits:

==== Hyundai brand ====
- Hyundai Accent LC
- Hyundai Sonata EF
- Hyundai Porter III
- Hyundai Elantra XD
- Hyundai Santa Fe SM
- Hyundai County
- Hyundai Trago Xcient

==== BYD brand ====
- BYD F3
