= General Motors Egypt =

Automobile manufacturer

General Motors Egypt S.A.E. جنرال موتورز مصر
- Type: Joint Venture
- Industry: Automotive
- Founded: 1983; 43 years ago
- Headquarters: 6th of October City, Giza Governorate, Egypt
- Number of locations: one location - 6th of October Plant – Giza - Egypt
- Key people: Sharon Nishi (Chair & MD)
- Products: Pickup Truck, Light Duty Truck, Passenger Cars, Passenger Van, Minibus
- Brands: Chevrolet; Cadillac
- Number of employees: +1,000
- Parent: General Motors
- Website: gmegypt.com

General Motors Egypt S.A.E. (جنرال موتورز مصر, or short GME) is an automotive manufacturer based in 6th October, Giza, Egypt. The company's plant is located in the 6th of October City. Despite its name, the company is a joint stock company with the majority of shares owned by General Motors Company and other shareholders. Al-Mansour Automotive Company is its exclusive distributor in Egypt.

== Overview ==
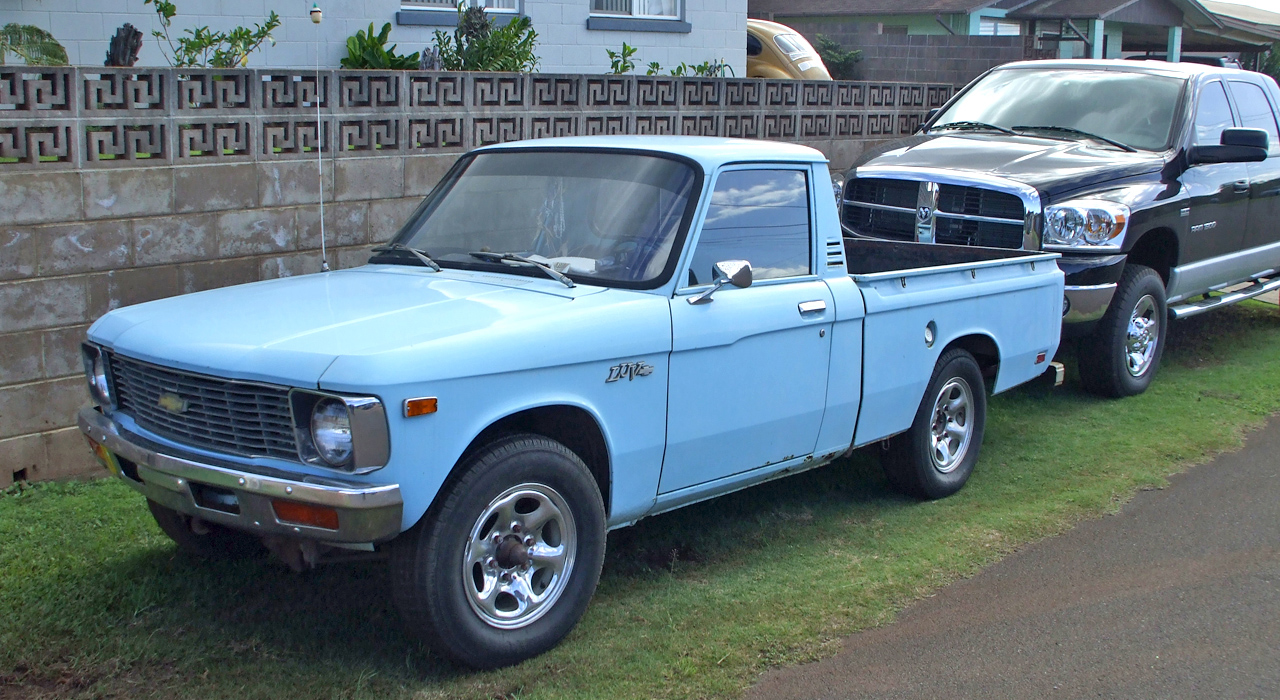
Chevrolet T Series

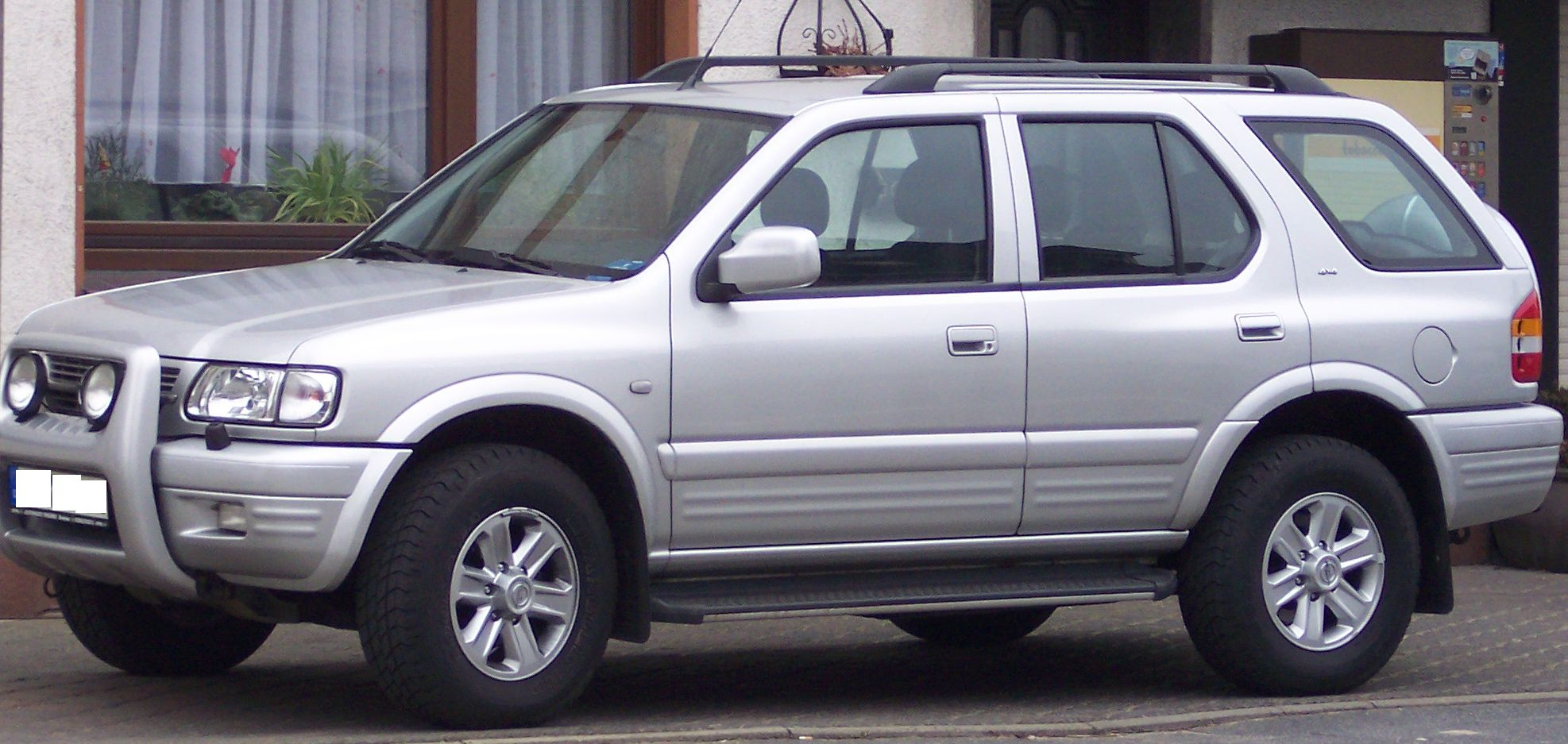
Chevrolet Frontera (Isuzu Rodeo)

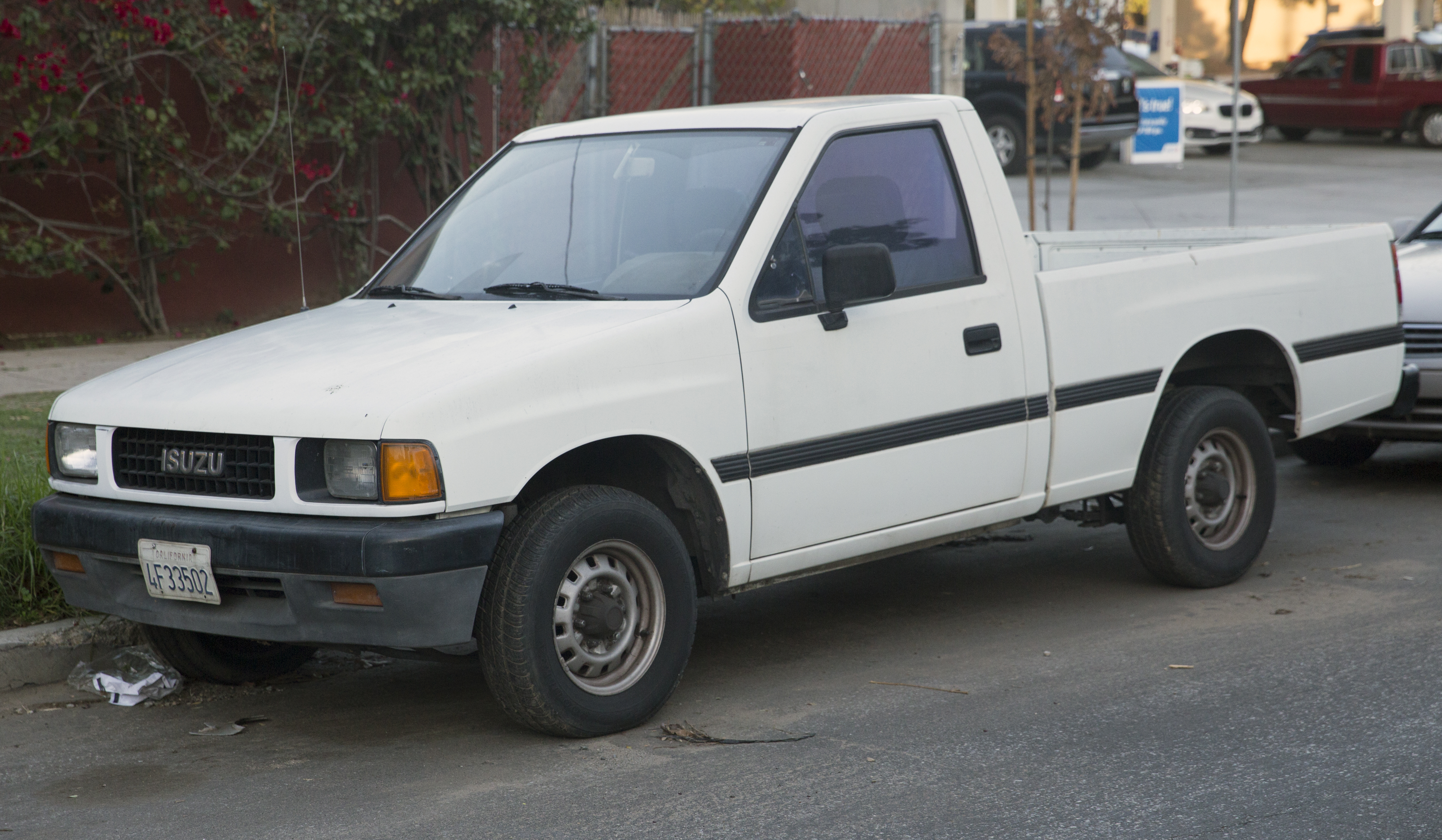
Chevrolet T-series (Isuzu TF)

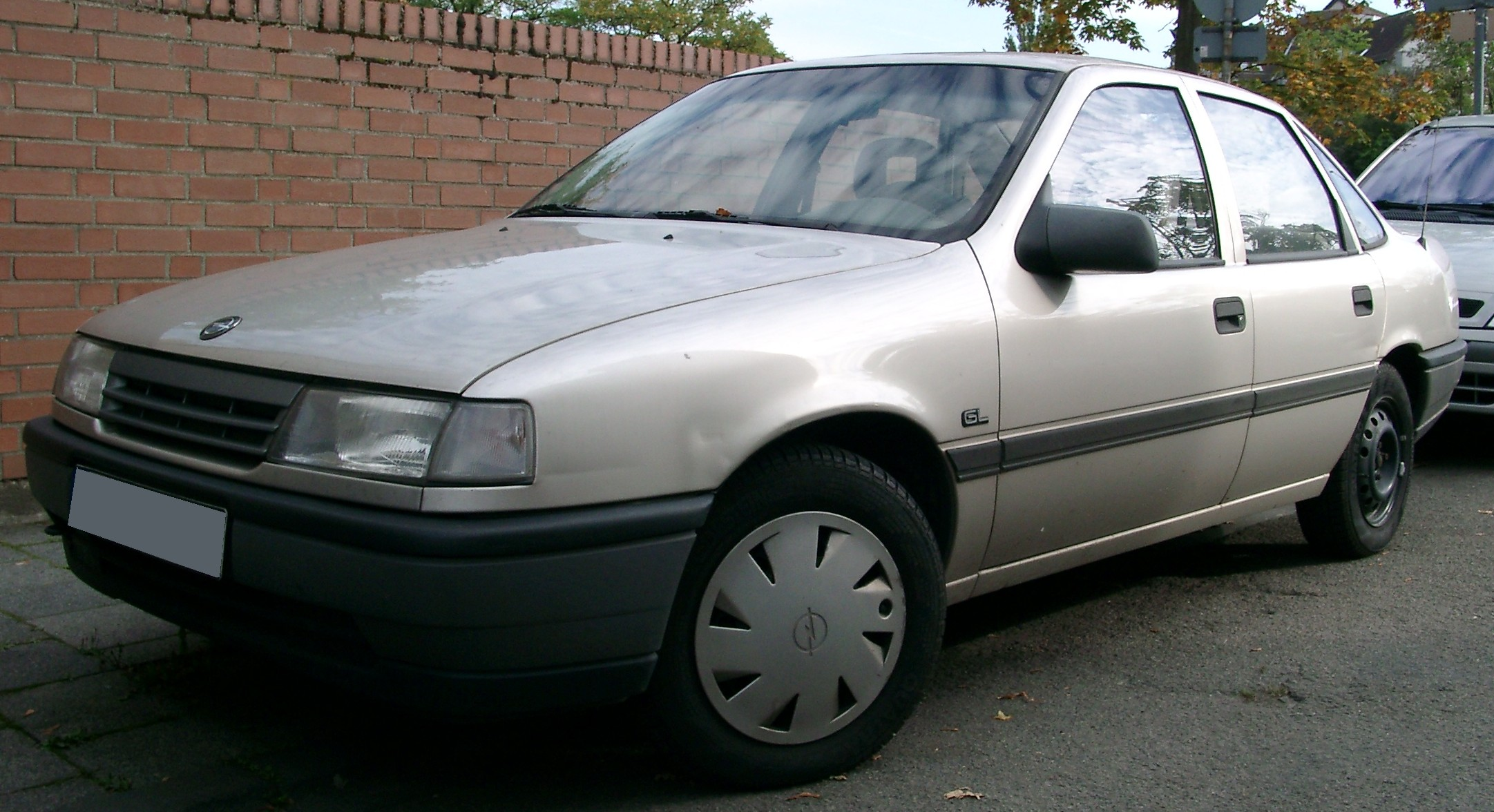
Opel Vectra

After eight years of successful cooperation with the American General Motors starting in 1975, the dealer made a proposal to build a production plant in Egypt. So the company was founded in the same year. One year later, the plant was opened in an internal opening ceremony. At the official plant opening in 1985 the first cars rolled off the company's production line. The opening speech was given by the former President of Egypt Hosni Mubarak. In 1987, continuous production finally started. The company was at this time only active as an automotive supplier. The first product was the chassis for the Isuzu TF which was assembled locally by another car assembler as the Chevrolet T Series. In their own plant, production of the Chevrolet Mini Bus began, which was based on the same platform. In 1993, the Mini Bus was replaced by the Opel Vectra. In the following year, GM Egypt began the assembling of the CKD imported Opel Corsa.

In 1996, the 100,000th vehicle left the production plant. In the same year, GM Egypt was honored by General Motors as the best producer of Opel vehicles worldwide, on account of the production quality of the vehicles. In the following year, the company achieved an annual production capacity of 24,225 units.

In 1998, two models were replaced by their newer generation. The old Isuzu TF was replaced by the new Isuzu Rodeo and the Chevrolet T Series was replaced by the identical Chevrolet Frontera. After 72 months of manufacturing of the successful Opel Vectra, GM Egypt improved the quality of the model and hoped this would achieve higher sales. The old model was now only faced as the new generation. For the exhibited posters and TV commercials participating in the American University Annual Advertising Competition, the GME was awarded with the bronze medal. ISO 9002 certification followed in 1992. In 2000 the Opel Astra was adopted to the model lineup which was an CKD assembled model also. A short time later, the production of the 200,000th vehicle was celebrated. In 2001, GME received its second certification to ensure a safe and healthy working environment in accordance with ISO 14001. In the same year, the contract with the Al-Monsour Automotive Company expired, which was subsequently replaced by a new contract.

General Motors Egypt began the full manufacturing of the Opel Astra Sedan and Opel Corsa Sedan in 2002. The Opel Vectra was renewed to its current generation at this time. As import models, the Chevrolet Aveo and Chevrolet Optra were launched in the Egyptian market in 2005. New vehicles manufactured by GME are the models Chevrolet Crew Cab and the identical Chevrolet T Series. Their own production of the Chevrolet Aveo began in 2007 at the GME plant. One year later, GME began manufacturing the Chevrolet Lanos in different luxury versions, parallel to the sporty model versions from the Speranza manufacturing. In 2009 GME began making the Chevrolet Captiva, Chevrolet Cruze and the Chevrolet N200. The last of these is exported to South American markets. The import models since 2009 are the Chevrolet N Series, Opel Astra, Opel Corsa and the Opel Insignia.

On 15 August 2013, General Motors Egypt suspended operations due to the ongoing violence and political unrest in the country, but reopened it 3 days later again.

== Current models ==
=== Automobiles ===
- Chevrolet Captiva
- Chevrolet Move (N300)
- Chevrolet Optra

=== Commercial vehicles ===
- Chevrolet N-Series
- Chevrolet T-Series
