= Daewoo Lanos =

Daewoo Lanos (T100)
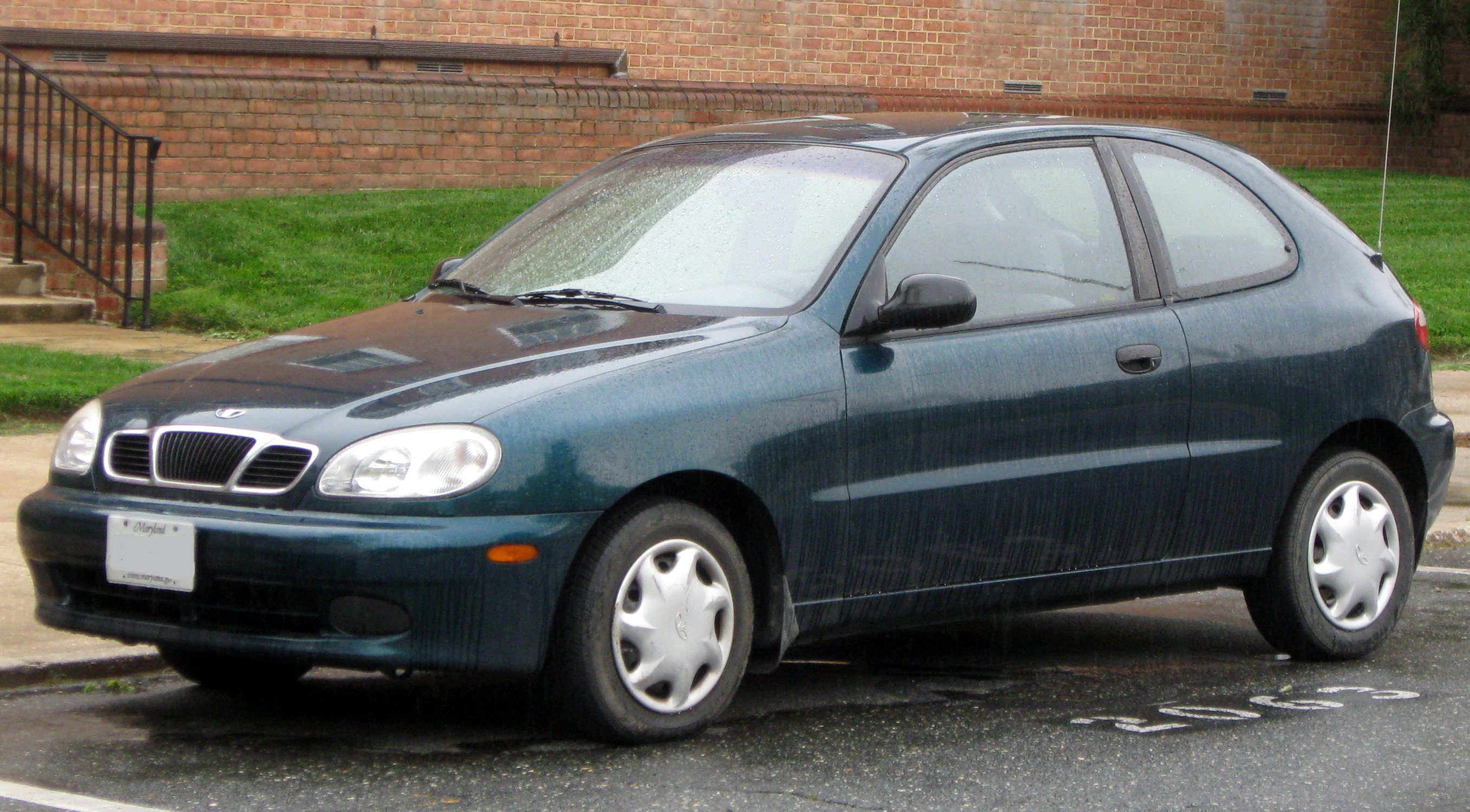
- Daewoo Lanos (T100) 3-door hatchback

Overview
- Manufacturer: Daewoo
- Also called: Chevrolet Lanos; Daewoo Sens; Doninvest Assol; FSO Lanos; ZAZ Lanos; ZAZ Sens; ZAZ Chance
- Production: 1997–2002 (Daewoo); 1997–2020 (CKD and license-built models)
- Assembly: South Korea: Bupyeong; Egypt: 6th of October City (GM Egypt: 2007–2020); Egypt: Cairo (Daewoo Motors Egypt, 1998–2012); Russia: Taganrog (Doninvest: 1998–2000); Ukraine: Zaporizhzhia (AvtoZAZ: 1998–2017); Poland: Warsaw (FSO: 1997–2008); Vietnam: Hanoi (VIDAMCO)
- Designer: Giorgetto Giugiaro at italdesign

Body and chassis
- Class: Subcompact car (B/C)
- Body style: 3 and 5-door hatchback; 4-door sedan; 2-door convertible (concept); 2-door panel van (since 2006); 2 and 4-door pickup truck (concept)
- Layout: Front-engine, front-wheel-drive
- Platform: GM T platform

Powertrain
- Engine: Petrol engine: 1299 cc MeMZ-301/307 I4; 1349 cc E-TEC I4; 1386 cc MeMZ-317 I4; 1399 cc F14D4 DOHC 16V I4; 1497 cc SQR477F I4; 1498 cc E-TEC I4; 1498 cc E-TEC DOHC 16V I4; 1598 cc E-TEC DOHC 16V I4
- Transmission: 5-speed Daewoo D16 manual; 4-speed GM 4T40E automatic; 4-speed ZF 4HP16 automatic

Dimensions
- Wheelbase: 2,520 mm (99.2 in)
- Length: 4,074 mm (160.4 in) (hatchback); 4,235 mm (166.7 in) (sedan); 4,247 mm (167.2 in) (panel van)
- Width: 1,678 mm (66.1 in)
- Height: 1,432 mm (56.4 in); 1,908 mm (75.1 in) (panel van)
- Curb weight: 990–1,177 kg (2,183–2,595 lb)

Chronology
- Predecessor: Daewoo Cielo; ZAZ Tavria (for ZAZ models)
- Successor: Daewoo Kalos

The Daewoo Lanos is a compact hatchback / sedan car produced by the South Korean manufacturer Daewoo from 1997 to 2002, and thereafter produced under license agreements in various countries worldwide. It has also been marketed as the Daewoo Sens, ZAZ Sens and ZAZ Lanos in Ukraine, Doninvest Assol and ZAZ Chance in Russia, FSO Lanos in Poland, or Chevrolet Lanos in Ukraine, Russia, and Egypt.

It was designed by Giorgetto Giugiaro and initially featured three body styles: three-door and five-door hatchbacks and a four-door sedan. The Lanos was designated the T100 model code at launch; the T150 code applies to the updated models introduced in 1999. In 2006, a panel van version, produced in Ukraine by ZAZ, was also introduced. The Daewoo Lanos was designed to replace the Daewoo Nexia in the Daewoo line-up and was itself replaced by the Daewoo Kalos.

Production of the Daewoo Lanos ended in 2017.

== Development ==
In 1992, Daewoo dissolved its joint-venture with General Motors, and simultaneously a decision was made to independently develop replacements for the contemporary Daewoo Motors products, based on older General Motors models. The Lanos development programme was formally started in autumn 1993, with the goal to create a car to replace the Nexia as Daewoo's small family car.

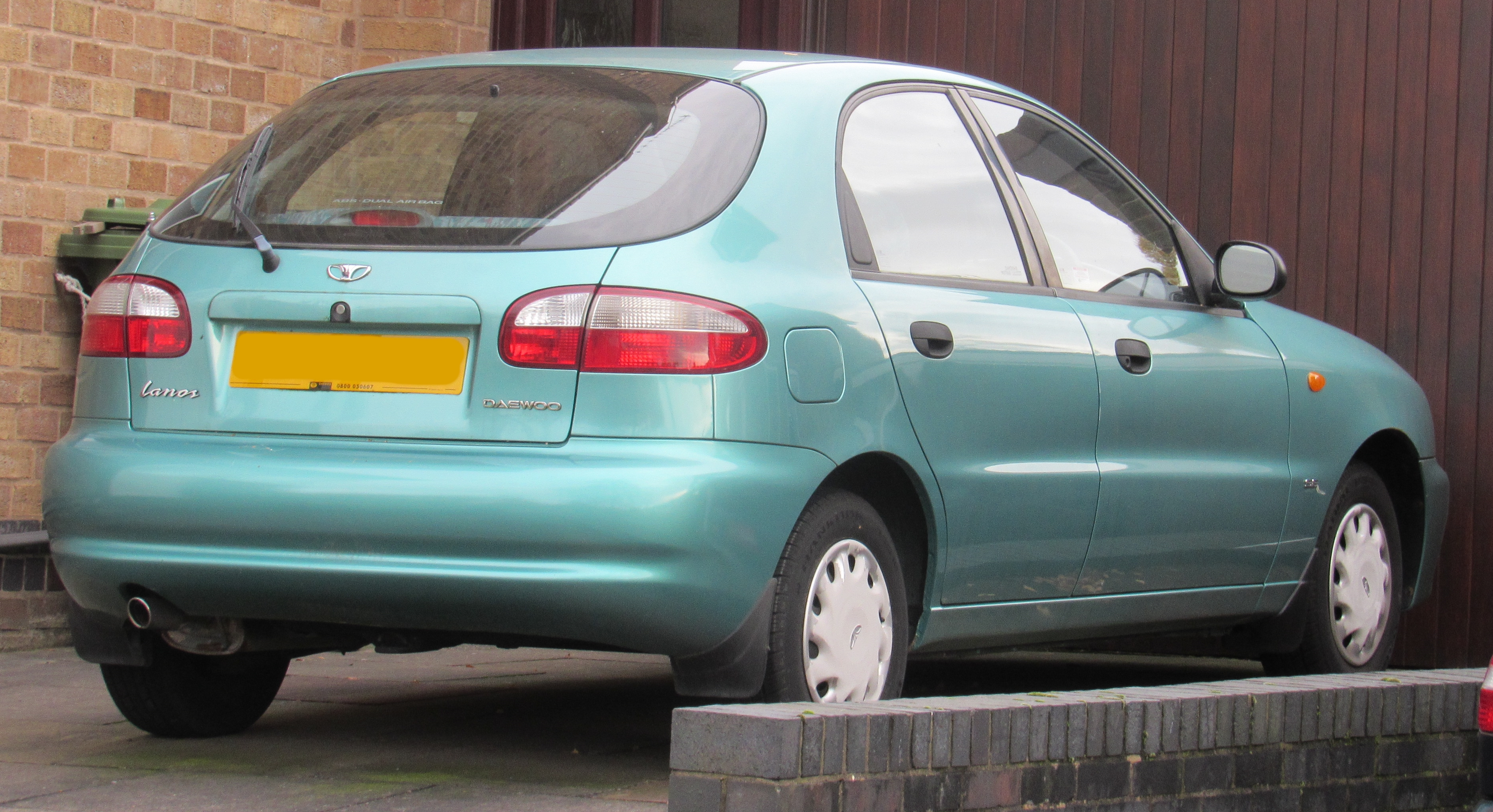
Daewoo Lanos (T100) SE 5-door hatchback

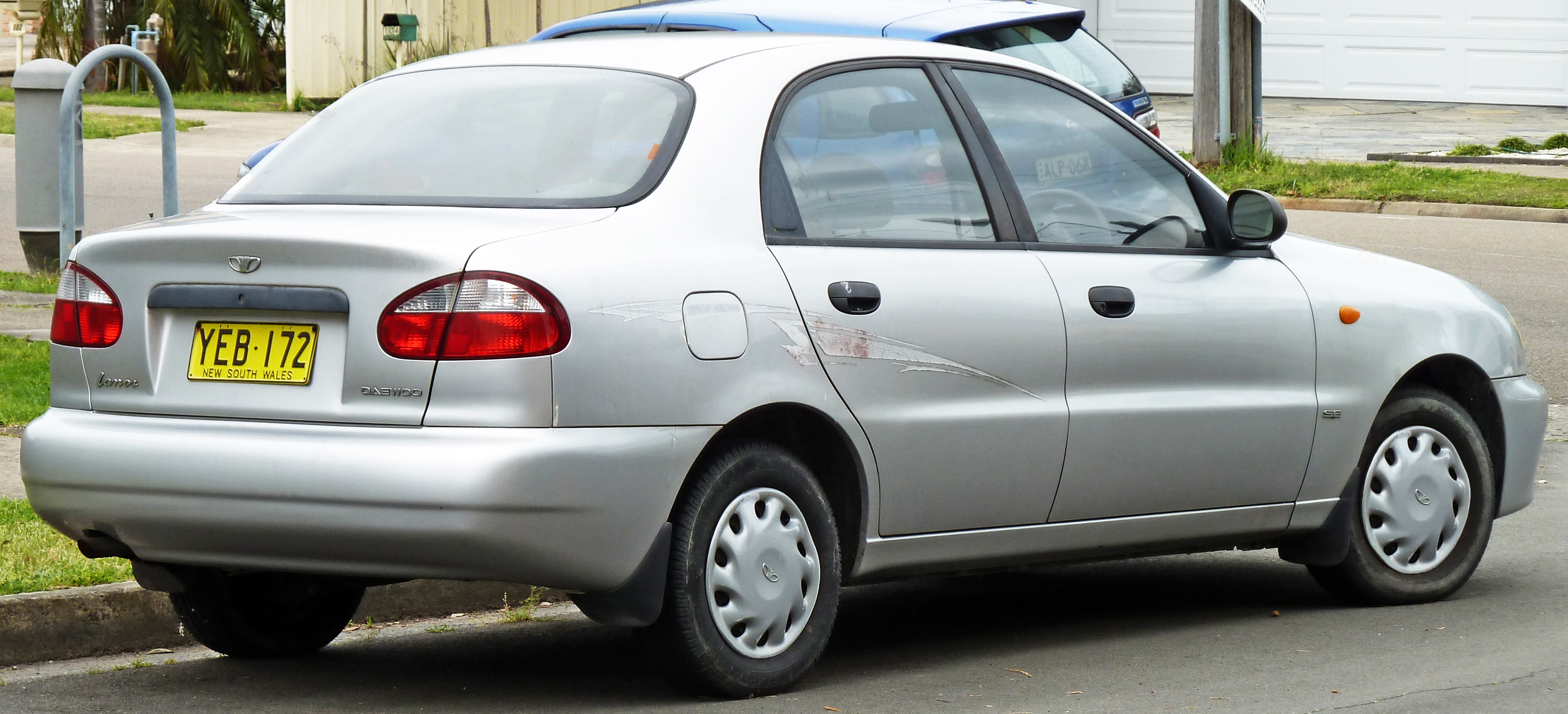
Daewoo Lanos (T100) SE sedan

The project began with a comparative study of competing models from 20 different manufacturers, with Toyota Tercel, Opel Astra and Volkswagen Golf identified as most competitive. Four design studios were commissioned to deliver clay models presenting their ideas for the new model's styling. Giorgetto Giugiaro's design was chosen, and Italdesign was commissioned to develop the car's final outside and interior styling. The technical side of the project was conducted simultaneously by Daewoo's development center in South Korea, as well as suppliers and contractors who were involved in developing particular components. This included AC Rochester (engine components), Delco Chassis Division (brakes, including ABS), GM Powertrain (automatic transmission), Italdesign (body, structural analysis, electrics, prototype construction), PARS Passive Rückhaltesysteme GmbH (airbags) and Porsche (vehicle concept – research, structural analysis, suspension and brake components, and experimental production supervision).

By the end of 1995, 150 prototypes were built (providing for three body styles). The development programme involved extensive testing in a multitude of locations. Safety tests included high-speed stability and durability testing in England, and brake testing on the Großglockner in Austria. Low-temperature testing was conducted in Canada, Sweden (Arjeplog), and Russia (Moscow, Khabarovsk) while high-temperature tests took place in the US (Death Valley), Oman (Nizwa), Australia (Alice Springs), Spain (Barcelona), and Italy (Nardò). The programme was completed in a remarkable time of only 30 months from the approval to the commencement of large-scale production of the Lanos sedan for the Korean market. Launched in South Korea in November 1996, European-market production began in 1997.

The initial, late-1996 South Korean launch model was only available as a four-door saloon with the 1.5-litre engine. During 1997 the 1.3-litre engine option was also added, as were the three- and five-door hatchbacks. In South Korea, the three-door model was called the "Lanos Romeo", while the five-door was called the "Lanos Juliet".

=== Lanos II (2000) ===
In April 2000, the Lanos was updated, with a revised front design and updates to the interior. Certain design features which had been applied only to the sportier hatchback variants were made standard on all hatchbacks, while the rear end of the Lanos saloon was fully redesigned, with new, more upright taillights. In South Korea, this model was marketed as the "Lanos II".

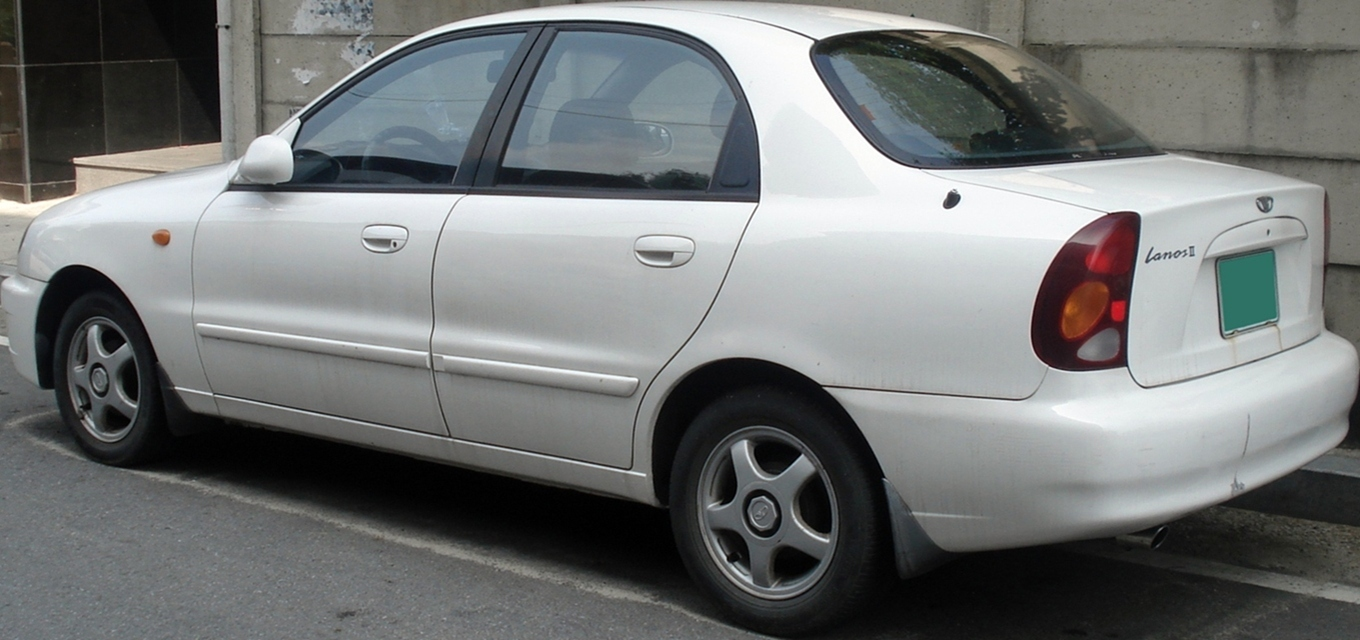
2001 Daewoo Lanos sedan (T150)

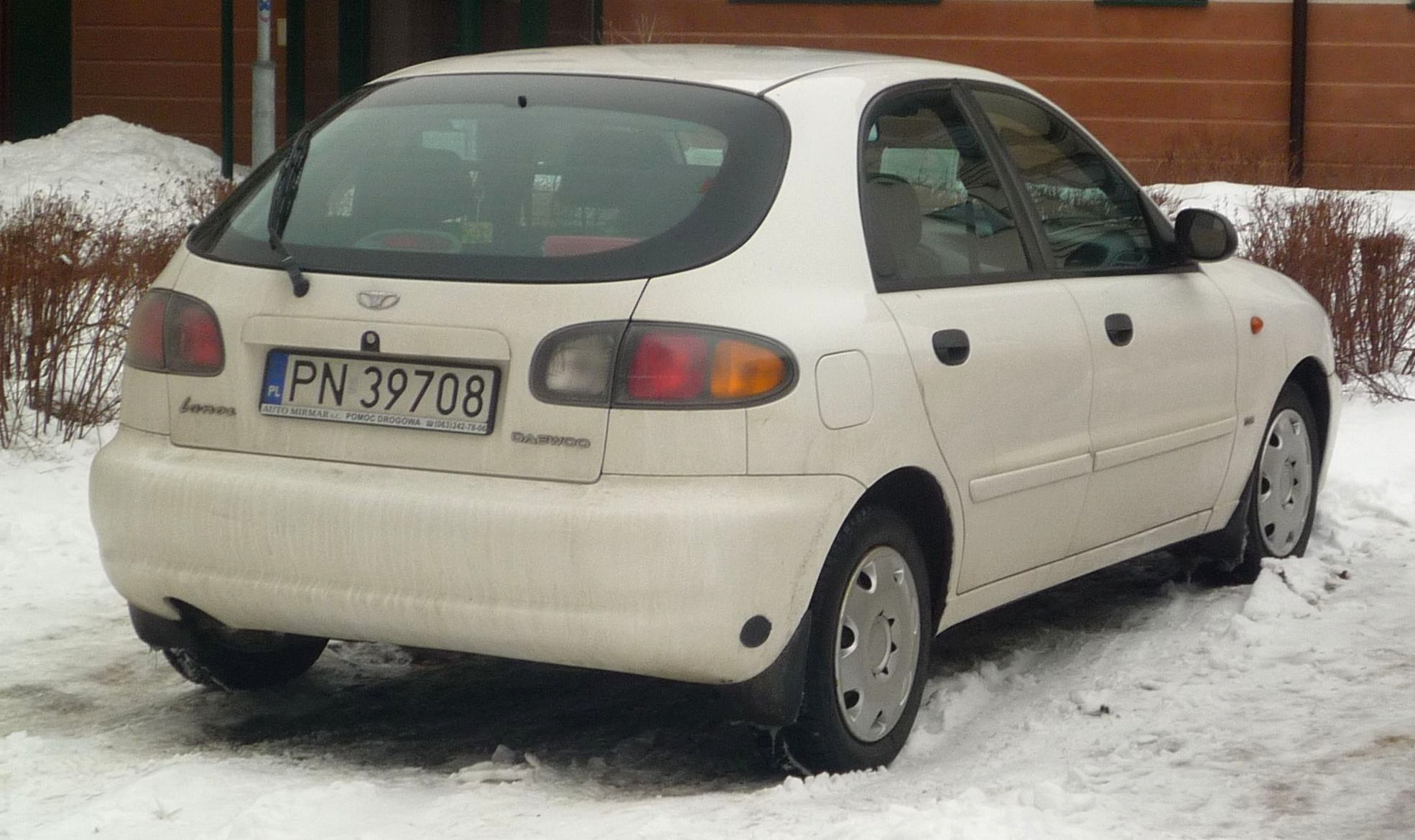
Daewoo Lanos 5-door hatchback (T150; facelift model)

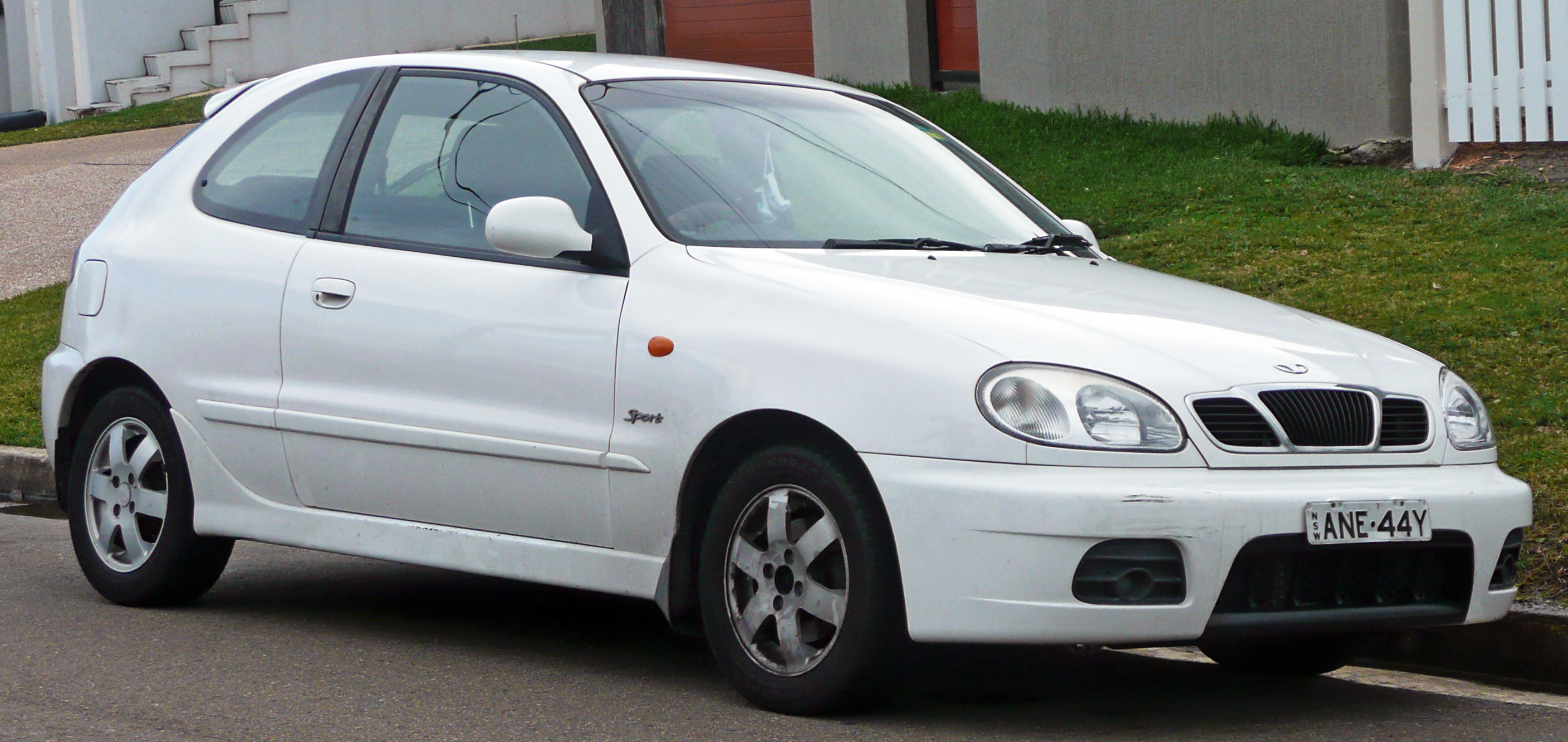
2001 Daewoo Lanos Sport 3-door hatchback (T150)

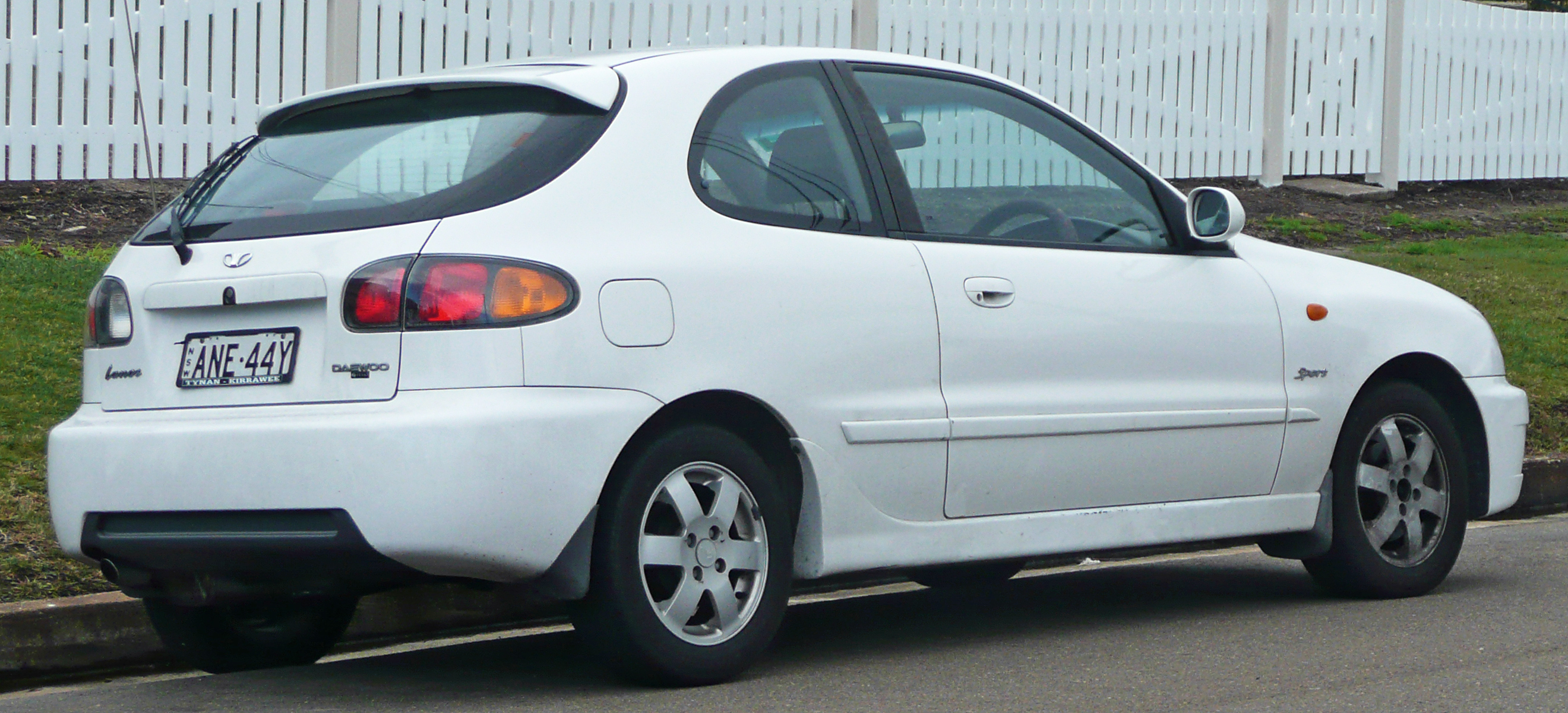
2001 Daewoo Lanos Sport 3-door hatchback; rear (T150)

== Technical details ==
The cars were equipped with E-TEC straight-four engine with single cam and twin cam engines ranging from 1.5 L (1,498 cc) and 86 PS (63 kW; 85 hp) SOHC to 1.6 L (1,598 cc) and 106 PS (78 kW; 105 hp) DOHC. In the UK and many countries of Europe (like Italy, France or Austria) there are also E-TEC models of 1.3 L (1,349 cc) - called a "1.4" by many European importers - and 75 PS (55 kW; 74 hp) and 1.6 L (1,598 cc) and 106 PS (78 kW; 105 hp). The suspension is built upon that of a Daewoo Nexia, itself derived from the 1984 Opel Kadett E.

On the mechanical side, all Lanos versions shared the same parts with a few exceptions. Differences between the 1.6 DOHC engine version and the other versions were:

- The 1.6 DOHC versions were equipped with 256 mm front brake rotors and 22 mm master cylinders rather than the 236 mm disks and 20 mm master cylinder found on the other versions with the less power engines.
- The 1.6 DOHC versions were equipped with D16 long ratio transmissions which had a slightly bigger final gear ratio compared to the D16 short ratio found on the other versions with the less power engines.
- The 1.6 DOHC versions were equipped with stiffer front springs to compensate for the heavier engine in comparison to both SOHC engines found in the other versions.

The four models available were S, SE, SE Plus, SX, and later, the SPORT model. The S was the base model and did not include many standard features (like a CD player or power windows). The SE was just a small step up from the S base model. However, the SX model usually included a CD, radio, and cassette player along with power windows, a power side mirror, and fog lights. A few select SX models even came with a sun-roof, though not many did. In the Lanos's later years, the SE and SX models were dropped and replaced with a new trim line called the SPORT (2001–2002). The SPORT included several features similar to the SX, but also included red/black leather seats and a metallic silver dash trim. Also, the SPORT model had window controls located on the doors rather than the center console (like in the previous trim lines).

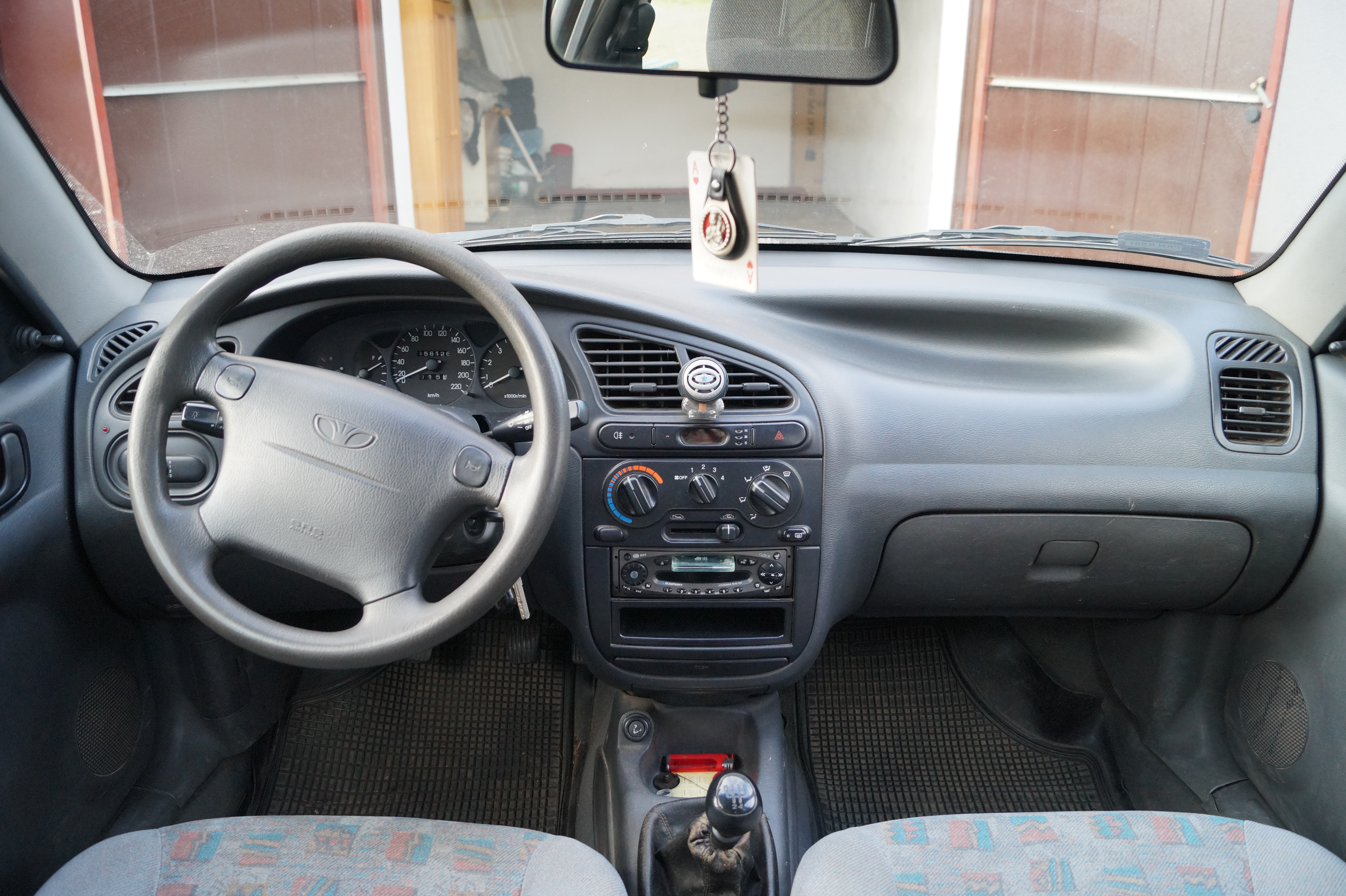
Interior (higher-end model)

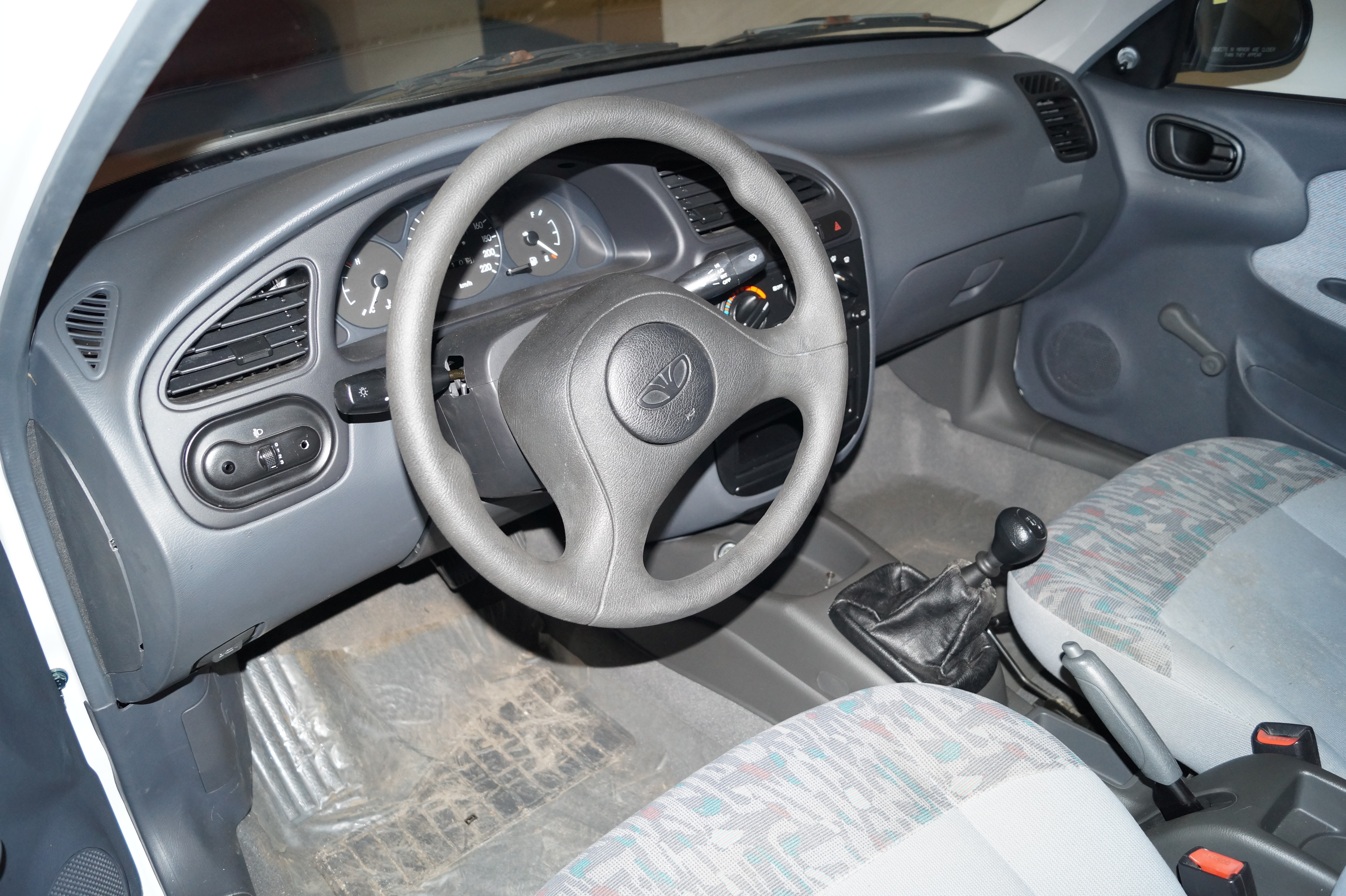
Interior (lower-end model)

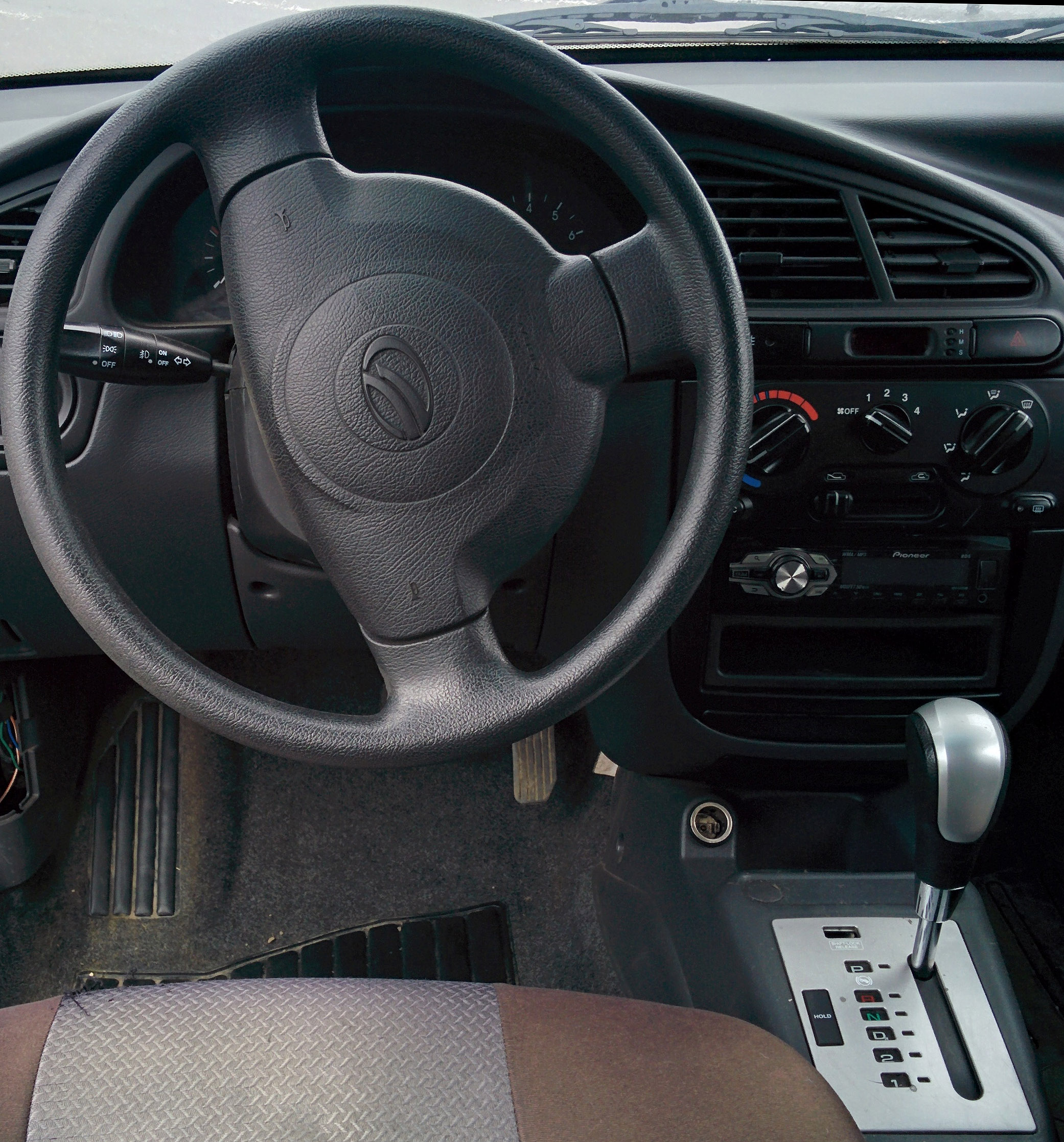
Interior with automatic transmission

== Marketing and production ==
Outside South Korea, the Lanos has been produced in Poland (from 1997 to 2008), Ukraine (from 1998 to 2017), Russia (briefly produced, from 1998 to 2000), Egypt (from 1998 to 2020). Most of the initial production was made using complete knock down (CKD) kits, which were supplied to FSO (in Poland), ZAZ (in Ukraine), TagAZ (in Russia), Daewoo Motors Egypt and GM Egypt (in Egypt) and VIDAMCO (in Vietnam).

=== Central and Eastern Europe ===
==== Poland ====
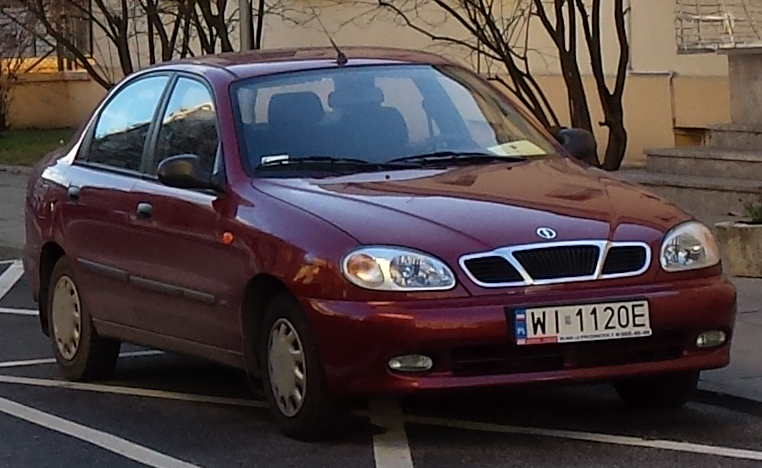
FSO Lanos sedan (T100)

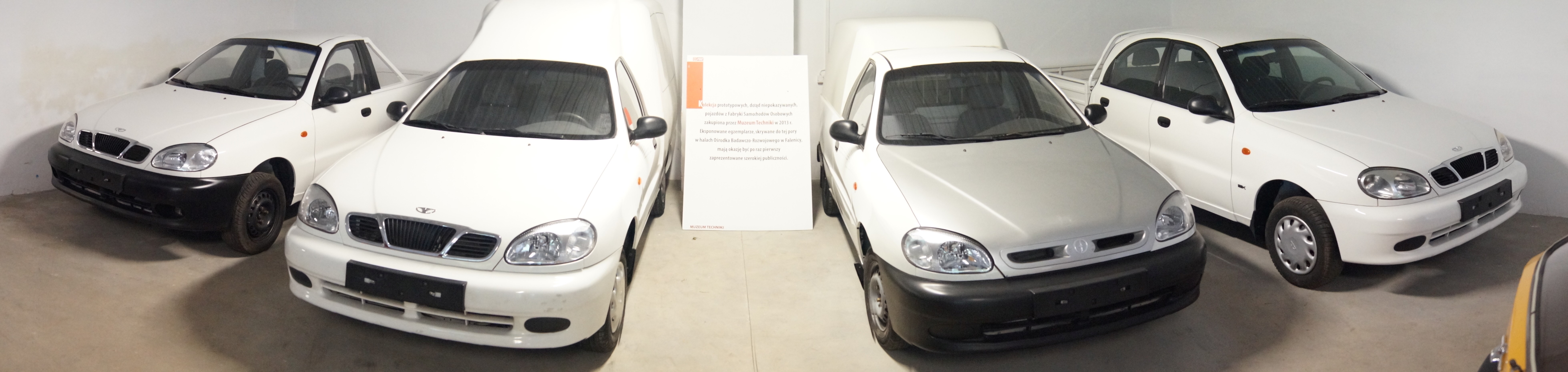
Daewoo Lanos commercial vehicle prototypes developed by FSO (based on the Daewoo Lanos T100)

In Poland, the Fabryka Samochodów Osobowych (FSO) plant in Warsaw began the production of the Lanos in 1998. Since January 2005, after the takeover of Daewoo by General Motors, the Lanos produced in Poland started to be sold under the brand name of FSO. It was produced until 2008, but only with the pre-facelift external design.

==== Russia ====
Doninvest Assol (Russia)

The Lanos was also briefly produced between 1998 to 2000 from CKD kits on Taganrog, Russia TagAZ factory; it was marketed as the Doninvest Assol by the Russian automaker Doninvest.

==== Ukraine ====
From 2002, ZAZ equipped some of the kits with a domestic MeMZ-307 engine and sold this version under the Daewoo Sens name; this practice continued with the start of full-scale production of the T150 model. In December 2004, ZAZ adopted the Lanos chassis for full-scale production and installed new welding and painting lines. From March 2009, the updated version was called ZAZ Lanos (internal model T150). The engines were still supplied by GM Daewoo, although a Chinese-developed engine from Chery Automobile has been fitted and there were plans to build the 1.6 L engine at the MeMZ plant.

Daewoo Sens sedan (T100)

ZAZ Lanos hatchback (T100)

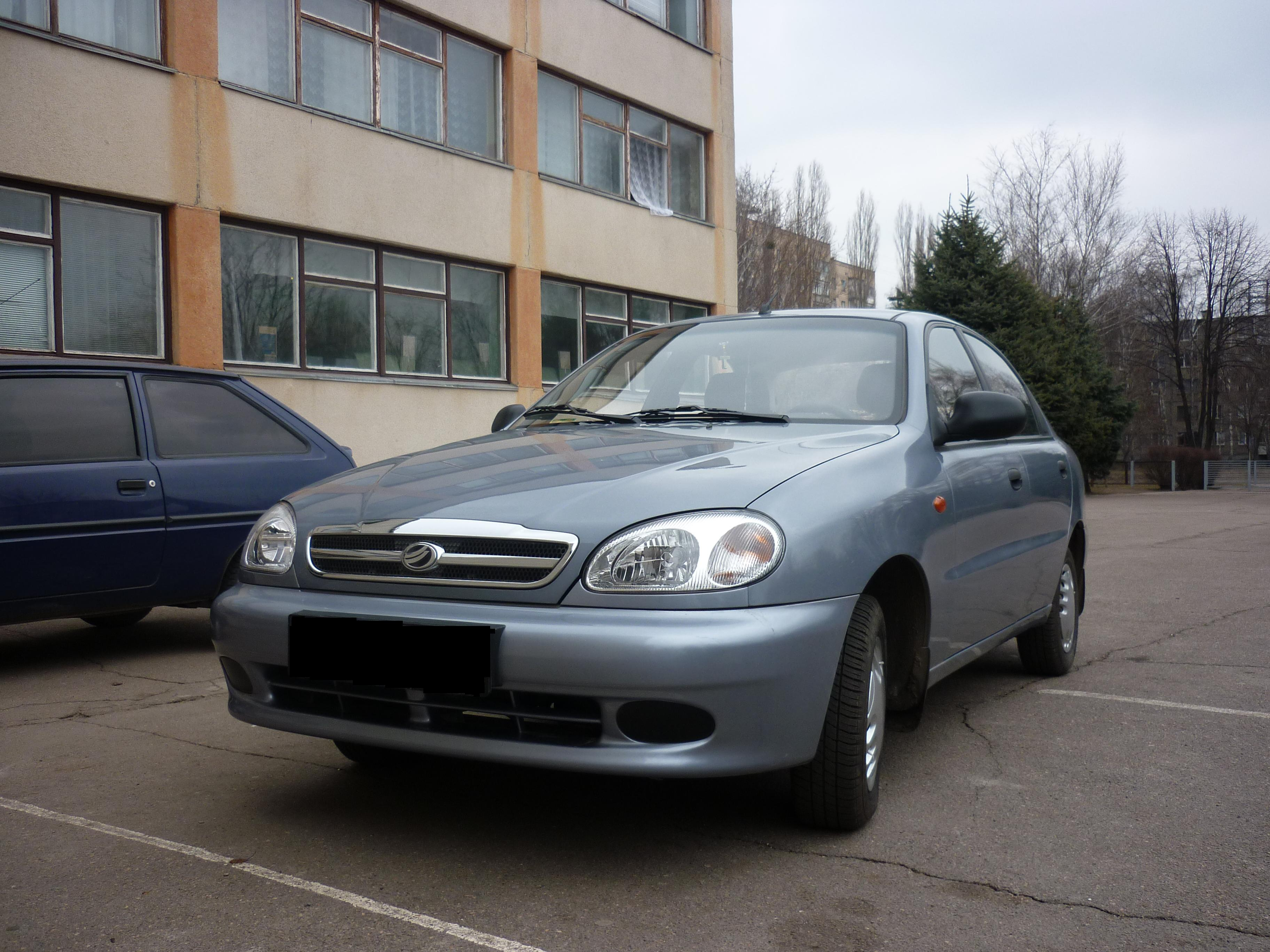
ZAZ Sens sedan (T150)

ZAZ Sens sedan (T150; rear view)

In 2005, General Motors contracted with ZAZ to provide Ukrainian-assembled Lanos models for the Ukrainian and Russian markets, to be imported duty-free, thanks to an international agreement, and sold through the GM dealer network. Sales of the Chevrolet Lanos sedan commenced in Russia in November 2005. The Chevrolet brand was utilized to help it compete against the Renault Logan. From July 2009, it was marketed in Russia as ZAZ Chance.

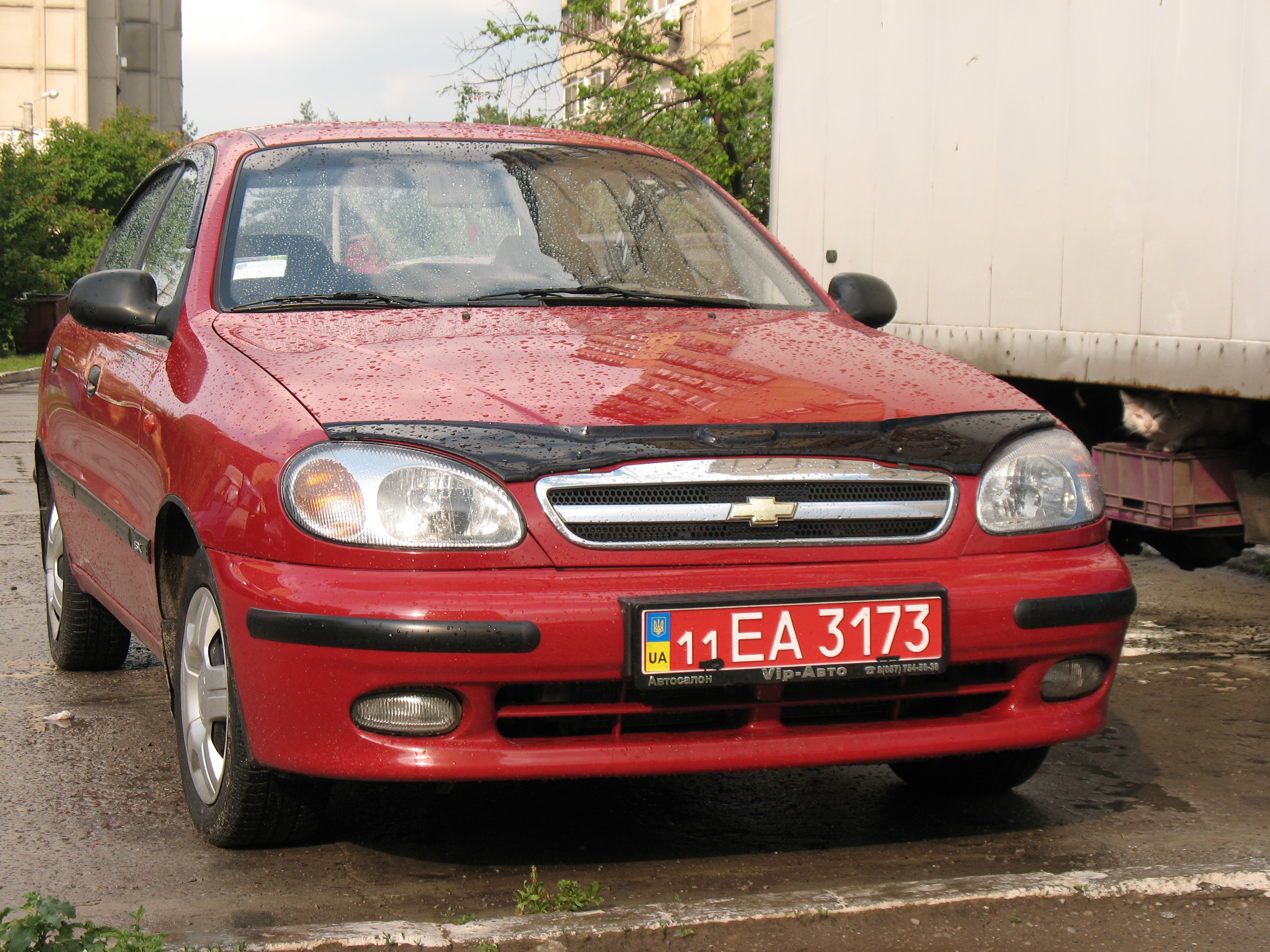
2006 Chevrolet Lanos (T150) sedan

ZAZ Chance hatchback (T100)

ZAZ Chance sedan (T100)

ZAZ Chance sedan (T150)

In 2006, a panel van variant of the ZAZ Lanos was introduced. The vans were equipped with a 50 L LPG balloon on their roof.

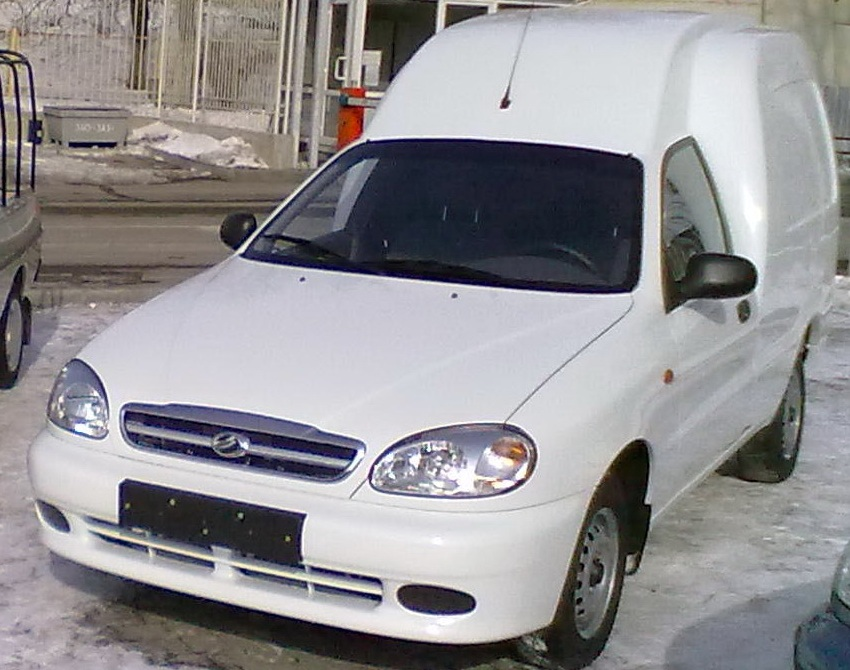
ZAZ Lanos Pick-up (based on ZAZ Lanos T150)

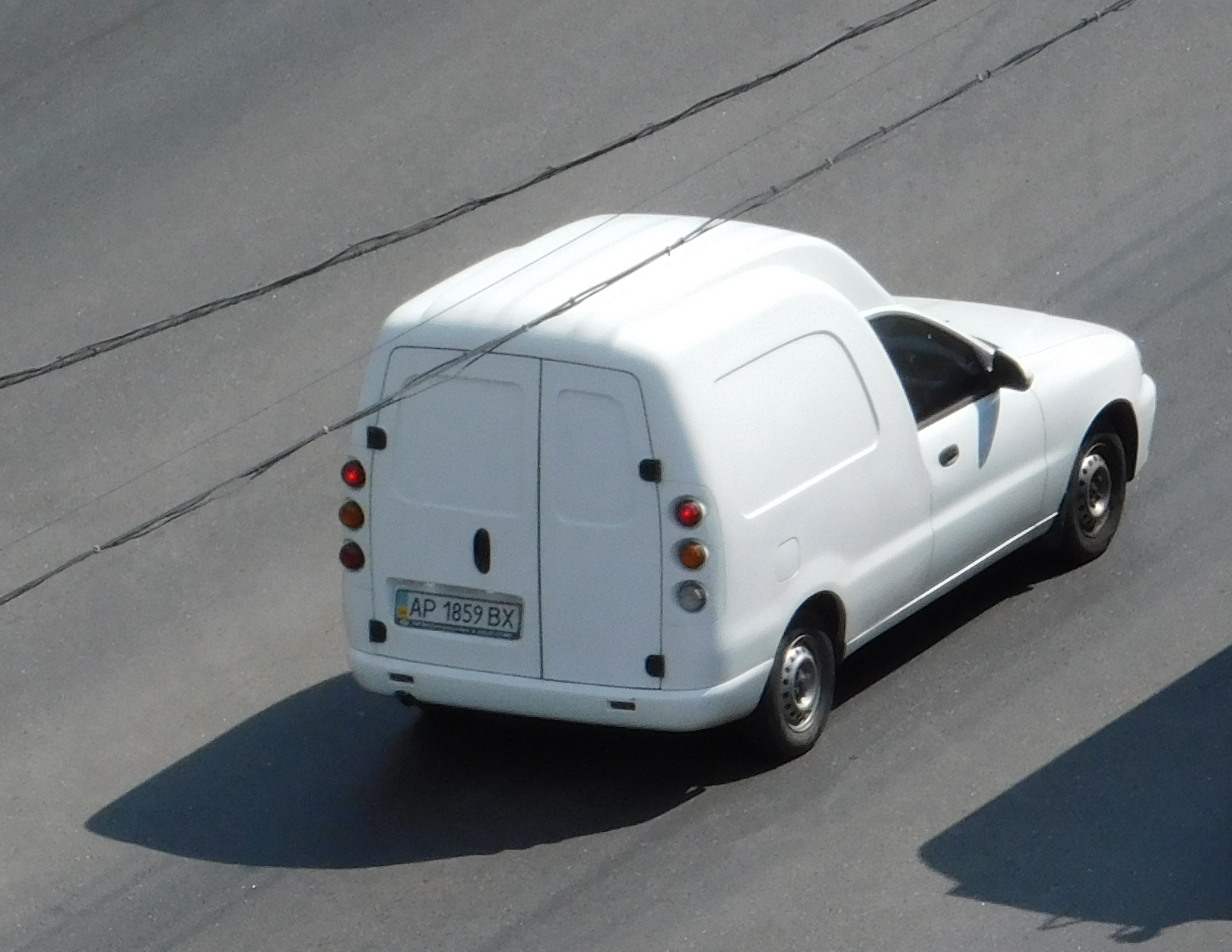
ZAZ Lanos Pick-Up (rear view)

At SIA-2007 in Kyiv ZAZ unveiled a facelifted Lanos with a Chinese engine. The concept was called ZAZ Lanos M and was planned to enter production in 2009 after finalizing the interior redesign. Eventually, all plans of refreshing the Lanos were cancelled.

In 2010 ZAZ showed an electric vehicle based on the ZAZ Lanos Pick-up called ZAZ Lanos Electro. It had a 15 kW motor and 8 batteries with approximately 100km of range. The concept was designed in collaboration with the NASU Institute of Electrodynamics in Kyiv. ZAZ planned to offer the model for custom assembly rather than serial production.

In 2013 the Lanos left the Russian market. On 29 November 2017 the assembly of passenger cars at ZAZ stopped. The panel van stayed in production until 2020.

=== Egypt ===
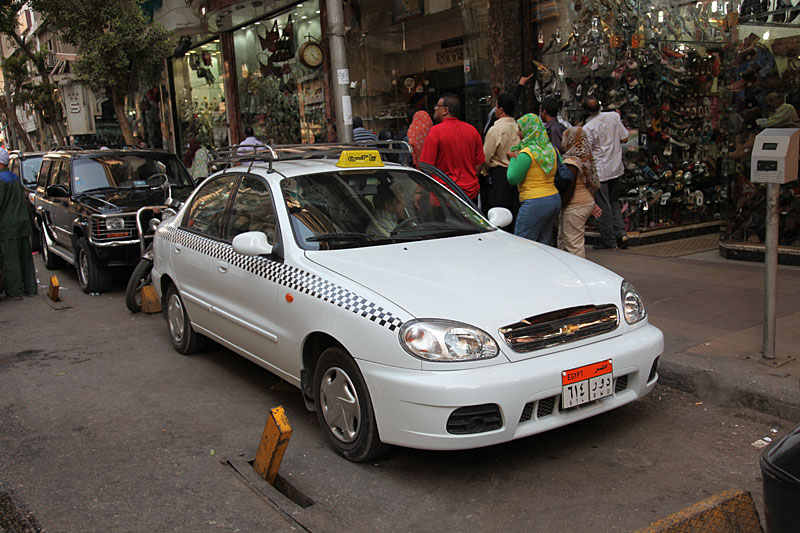
Chevrolet Lanos (T150) assembled in Egypt using parts from ZAZ

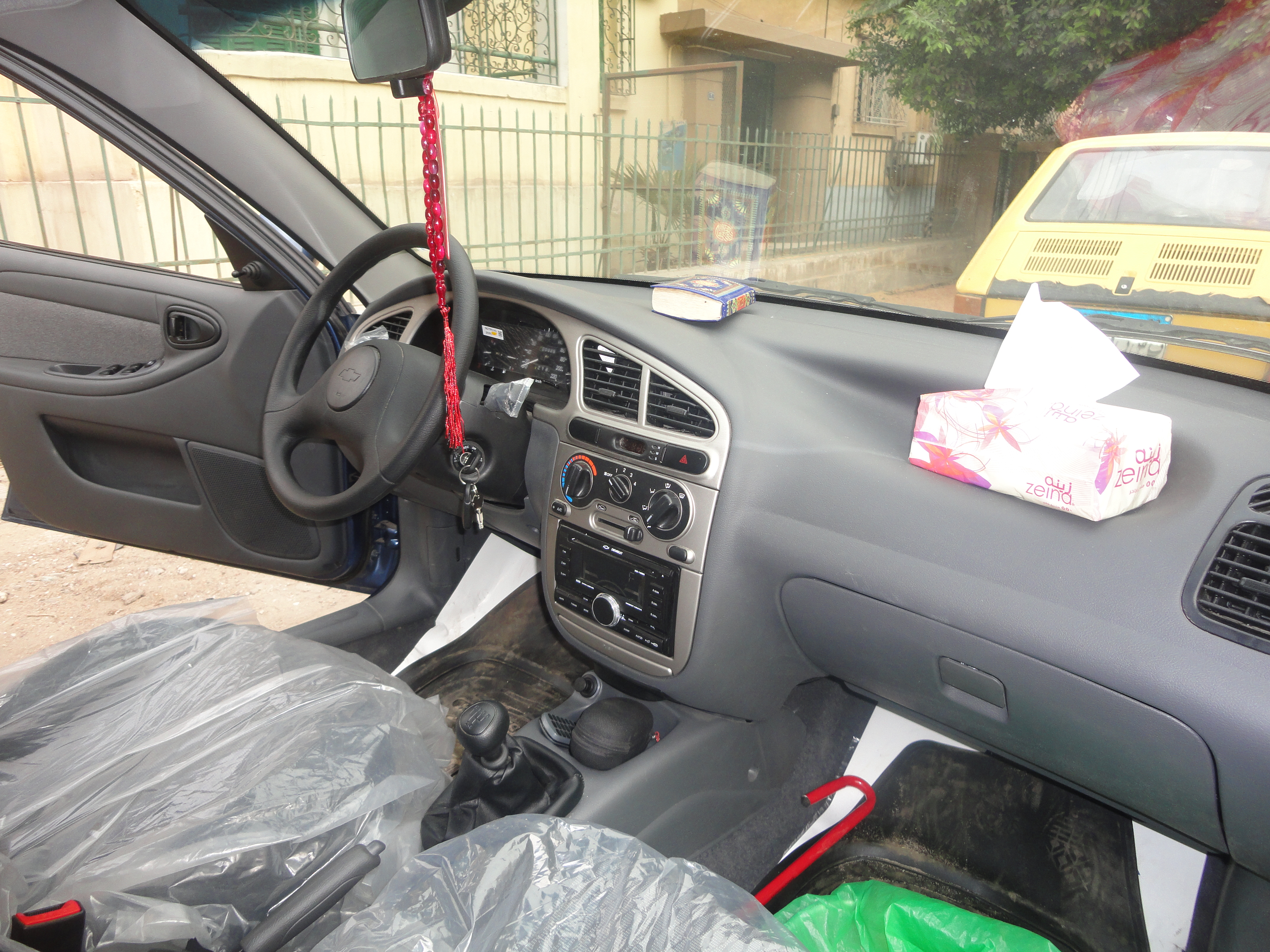
Interior

In late 1998, the Daewoo Motor Egypt factory in Cairo started the assembly of the Daewoo Lanos in both four-door and five-door shells with the 1.5 SOHC engine. The hatchback version was called "Juliet". The four-door was available in two versions:

- The SX model which was fully loaded with all options plus an automatic transmission
- The S model that had A/C, power steering and radio cassette plus a manual transmission

The five-door version of the Lanos (AKA Juliet) came with full options as the SX trim but with manual transmission.

Near the end of 2000 the Lanos was introduced with a different rear-end design and a facelifted front (different front bumper and grille). It was called "Lanos II" in this particular market. An SE version came with all the options plus the manual transmission. The automatic transmission version was stopped shortly after the introduction of the "Lanos II".

Between mid-2000 and 2001 the factory produced an even more frugal four-door version of the Lanos II with no options at all but a cassette. Those were sold by the Egyptian ministry of defense to army officers with a decently low price compared to the car's value at that time.

The facelifting also included the five-door Juliet to have the same changes as the four-door version on the front but on the rear it only had a different tail-light design and bumper rather than a wholly different rear-end design like the sedan. The production of the Juliet stopped in 2005.

In November 2008, GM Egypt started producing the Chevrolet Lanos in 6th of October City, from Ukrainian-supplied kits.

== Sales ==
=== Australia and North America ===
The Lanos was finally phased out after the 2002 model year, superseded worldwide by the Daewoo Kalos. Daewoo ceased operations in North America. After GM took over Daewoo to become GMDAT, Chevrolet began importing the Daewoo Kalos, rebadged as the Aveo, to North America beginning with MY 2004. However, the Lanos continues to be sold in Mexico and Latin America.

The 2001 and 2002 models follow a recent trend among cars intended to be sold in many markets, in that their rear lamps are asymmetric, with the fog lamp and reverse lamp occupying complementary spots on the driver's side and passenger side respectively; consequently, the rear lamps differ between left- and right-hand drive examples.

=== Ukraine ===
In Ukraine, the Lanos has been the best-selling car since at least 2006, and until 2014 (except 2012), being produced by the local manufacturer ZAZ under its own brand (starting from 2005). Over the years, 364,000 cars were bought in Ukraine. The production of Lanos passenger cars ended in 2017, while the panel van was produced there until 2020.

== Safety ==
In Australia, the 1997–2003 Daewoo Lanos was assessed in the Used Car Safety Ratings 2006 as providing "worse than average" protection for its occupants in the event of a crash.

Europe: models received the following European New Car Assessment Program (Euro NCAP) 1998 ratings:

- Adult Occupant:, score 17
- Pedestrian:, score 11 (pre-2002 rating)

In crash tests conducted by ANCAP in 1998 to Euro NCAP protocols RHD Lanos 3dr hatchback showed poor performance, scoring 0.31 out of 16 in offset front crash test and 6.98 of 16 in side impact test. Russian magazine Autoreview tested LHD Chevrolet Lanos T150 sedan built by ZAZ in 2006. It scored 10.5 of 16 points in offset front crash test.
