= Doninvest =

Russian car manufacturer

- Founded: 1991
- Defunct: January 2014
- Headquarters: Taganrog, Russia

Doninvest (Russian: Финансово-Промышленная Группа Донинвест) was a Russian industrial group that manufactured cars in Taganrog and Aksay, Rostov Oblast.

The firm produced Daewoo cars on license for the Russian market under an own brand. Their best known models were the Doninvest Assol, the Doninvest Kondor, and the Doninvest Orion.

== History ==
Doninvest Bank was founded in 1991 by Mikhail Paramonov. In 1995, the bank financed a plan to assemble Pontiac cars in the Krasny Aksay plant.

The first Daewoo-branded vehicles began to be manufactured in 1995, at the Krasny Aksay plant. The first models were the Daewoo Nexia and Daewoo Espero. Doninvest began to manufacture own-brand vehicles on license in 1997, in an attempt to diversify the group holdings. In 1997 Krasny Aksay was sixth in the rank of the country's car plants, producing 13,200 vehicles. The bankruptcy of Daewoo in 2000 meant that the company only built 34 cars in the first nine months of the year.

In May 1999 the company signed an agreement with Citroën to build the Orion M, as the rebadged Citroën Berlingo became known on the Russian market. It turned out to be the only Citroën marketed by Doninvest. Production on this model ended in 2003 with a total production run of 800–1,000 vehicles, and with it ended the group's partnership with Citroën.

The TagAZ plant entered a partnership with Hyundai in 2001, but after the Korean carmaker built its own Russian factory in 2010, TagAZ ceased to be of interest to them. During its last years of operation, the factory assembled Chery cars. TagAZ was declared bankrupt in January 2014; the Doninvest Bank followed during the same year.

== Models ==
Car models produced by the company:

- Doninvest Assol (Daewoo Lanos, TagAZ plant)
- Doninvest Orion (Daewoo Nubira, TagAZ plant)
- Doninvest Kondor (Daewoo Leganza, Krasny Aksay plant)
- Doninvest Orion M (Citroën Berlingo)
