= JAC Heyue Tongyue =

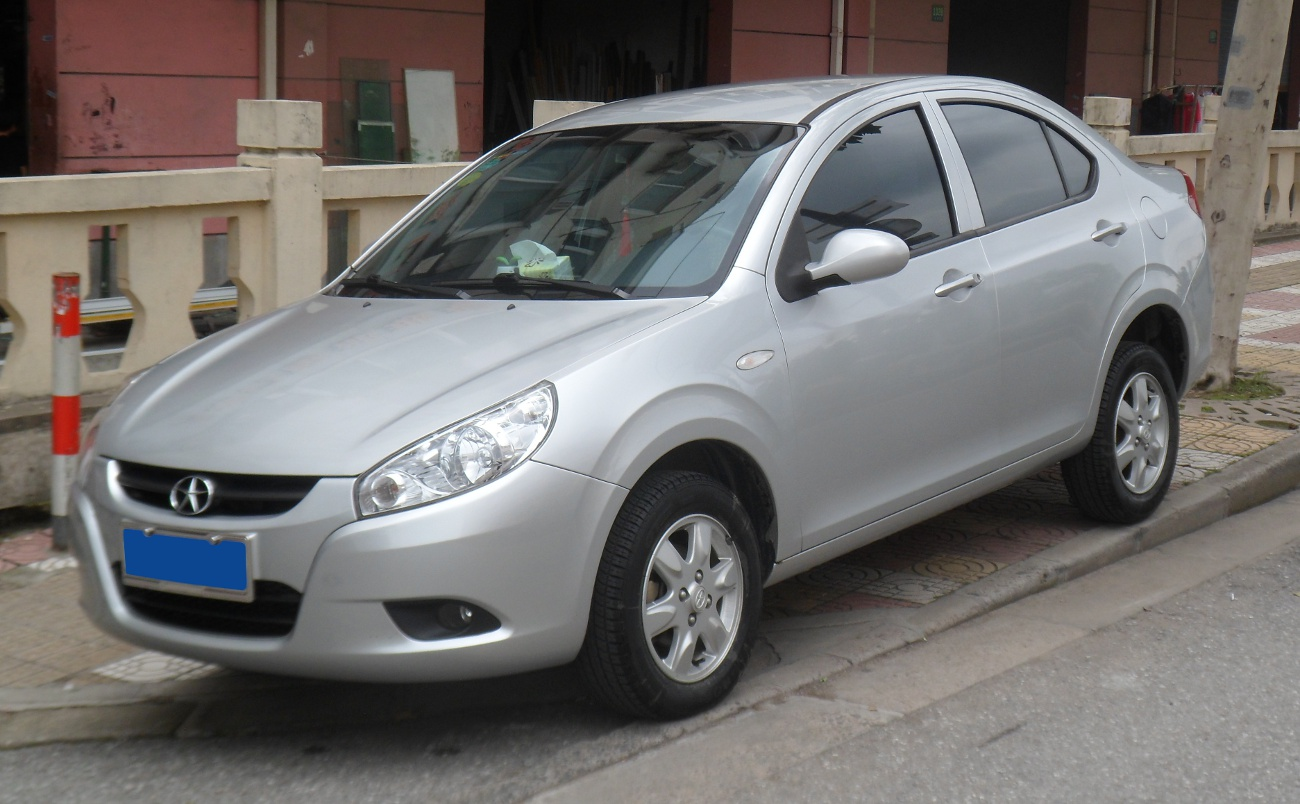

Overview
- Manufacturer: JAC Motors
- Also called: JAC J3; JAC J3 Turin (sedan); JAC A13; JAC iEV4; JAC Turismo
- Production: 2008–2017
- Model years: 2008–2017
- Assembly: China, Ethiopia, Egypt, Iran and Vietnam
- Designer: Goran Popović at Pininfarina

Body and chassis
- Body style: 4-door sedan 5-door hatchback

Powertrain
- Engine: 1.3 L 4G13 I4 (petrol)
- Transmission: 5-speed manual CVT automatic

Dimensions
- Wheelbase: 2,410 mm (94.9 in)
- Length: 4,155 mm (163.6 in)
- Width: 1,650 mm (65.0 in)
- Height: 1,465 mm (57.7 in)(sedan); 1,425 mm (56.1 in) (RS)

The JAC Heyue Tongyue (also known as JAC J3) is a subcompact sedan and hatchback produced by JAC Motors in the early 2000s under the Heyue brand in China. Prices as sales began ranged from 52,800 to 58,800 yuan for the sedan and started at 54,800 yuan for the standard Tongyue RS.

== Overview ==
=== Development ===
The development of the J3 project begin in 2005 when JAC Motors signed a contract with the Italian design house Pininfarina for the development of a new family of compact cars; in 2008 the prototypes JAC A107 (two-box hatchback) and A108 (three-box sedan) are presented to Auto China and shortly thereafter they move on to industrialization. A new front-wheel drive chassis with a transverse engine is developed while an agreement is made with Mitsubishi Motors (Mitsubishi Orion engine) for the supply of a 1.3-liter 16V four-cylinder (4G13).

=== Production version ===
Launched in 2008 as the JAC Tongyue sedan and the JAC Tongyue RS hatchback, the subcompact sedan and hatchback was sold worldwide under the JAC badge, with RS being the symbol for JAC hatchbacks. A later rearrangement within the JAC product line relisted the Tongyue under the Heyue brand of JAC, and the name was changed to Heyue Tongyue sedan and Heyue Tongyue RS hatchback.

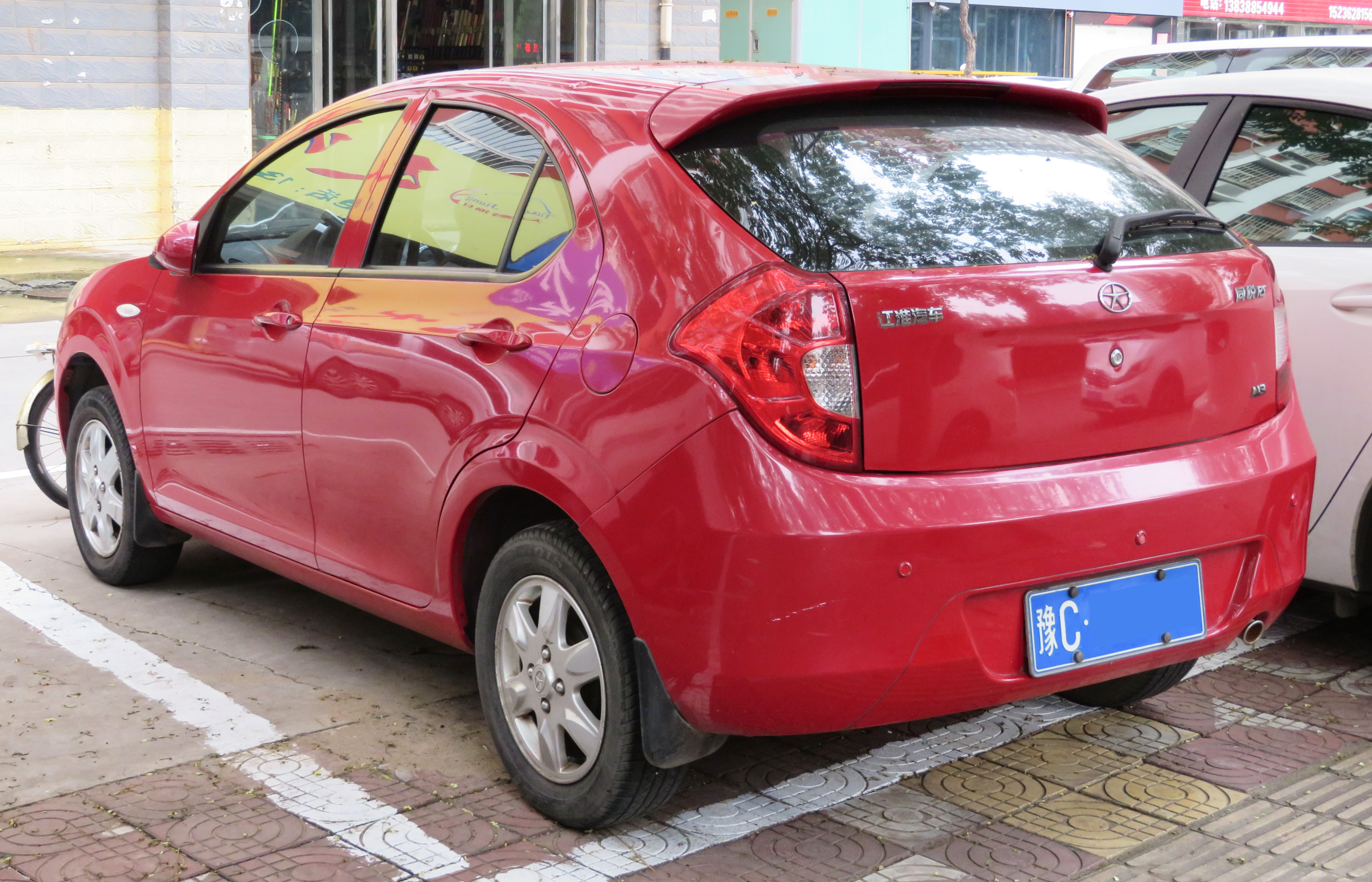
JAC Heyue Tongyue RS (hatchback)

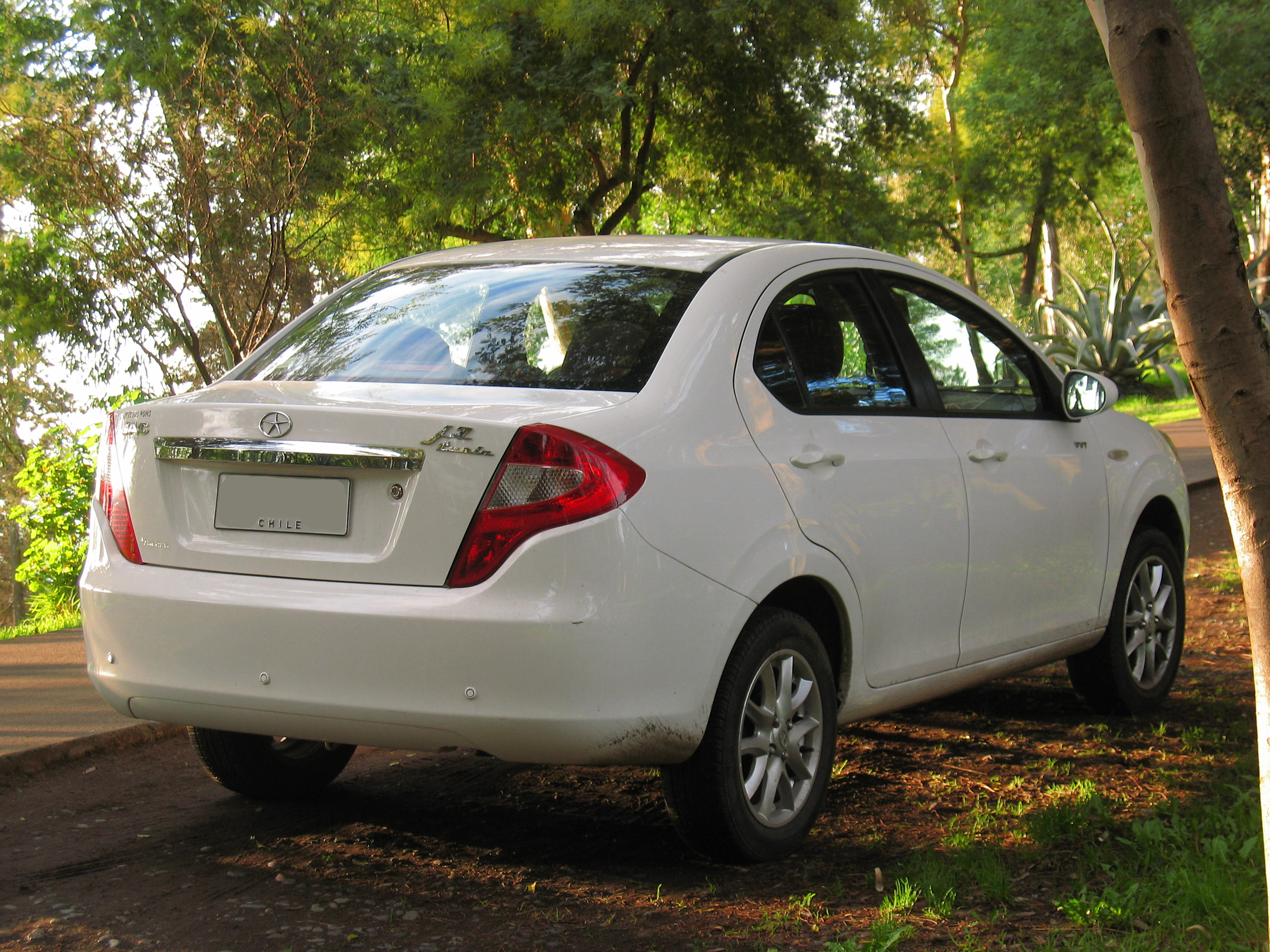
JAC J3 Turin (sedan)

A facelift in 2014 changed the name of the sedan to Heyue A13. The facelift features a redesigned front with smoked lamps and a restyled rear end with horizontal lamps extending on to the trunk lid. The Heyue A13 was powered by a 1.3 liter DOHC natural aspirated engine producing 73 kW (98 hp) and 124 N⋅m (91 lbf⋅ft) of torque.

=== Safety ===
The Chinese-made J3 in its most basic Latin American version with 2 airbags received 1 star for adult occupants and 2 stars for toddlers from Latin NCAP 1.0 in 2012.

Latin NCAP 1.0 test results Jac J3 + 2 Airbags (2012, based on Euro NCAP 1997)
Test	Points	Stars
Adult occupant:	3.50/17.0	1 /5 stars
Child occupant:	13.03/49.00	2 /5 stars

== JAC Tongyue RS Cross ==
The JAC Tongyue RS Cross is the crossover version of the JAC Tongyue RS with power coming from a 1.3 litre engine producing 73 kW (98 hp) and 126 N⋅m (93 lb⋅ft) of torque.

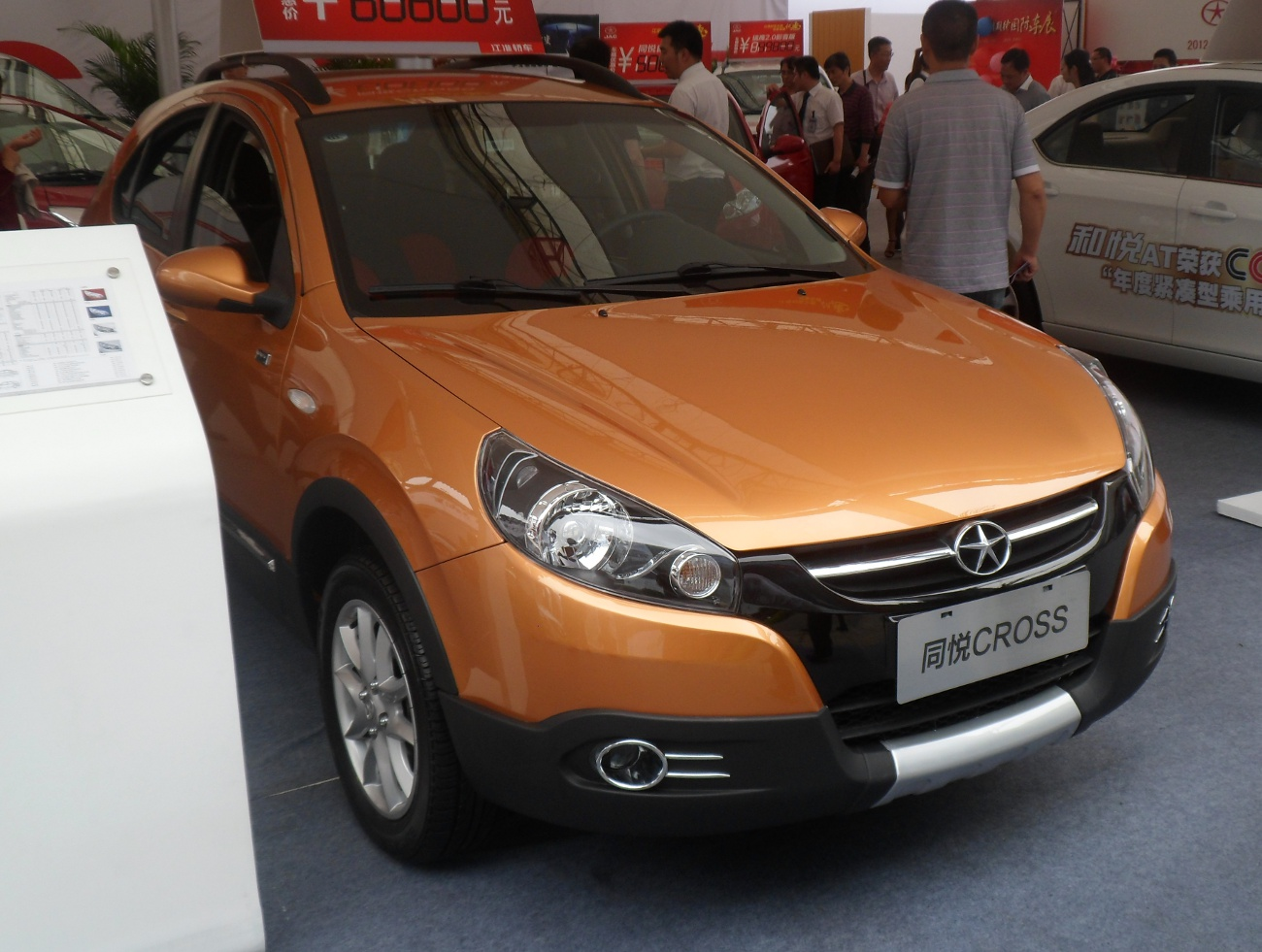
Tongyue RS Cross version

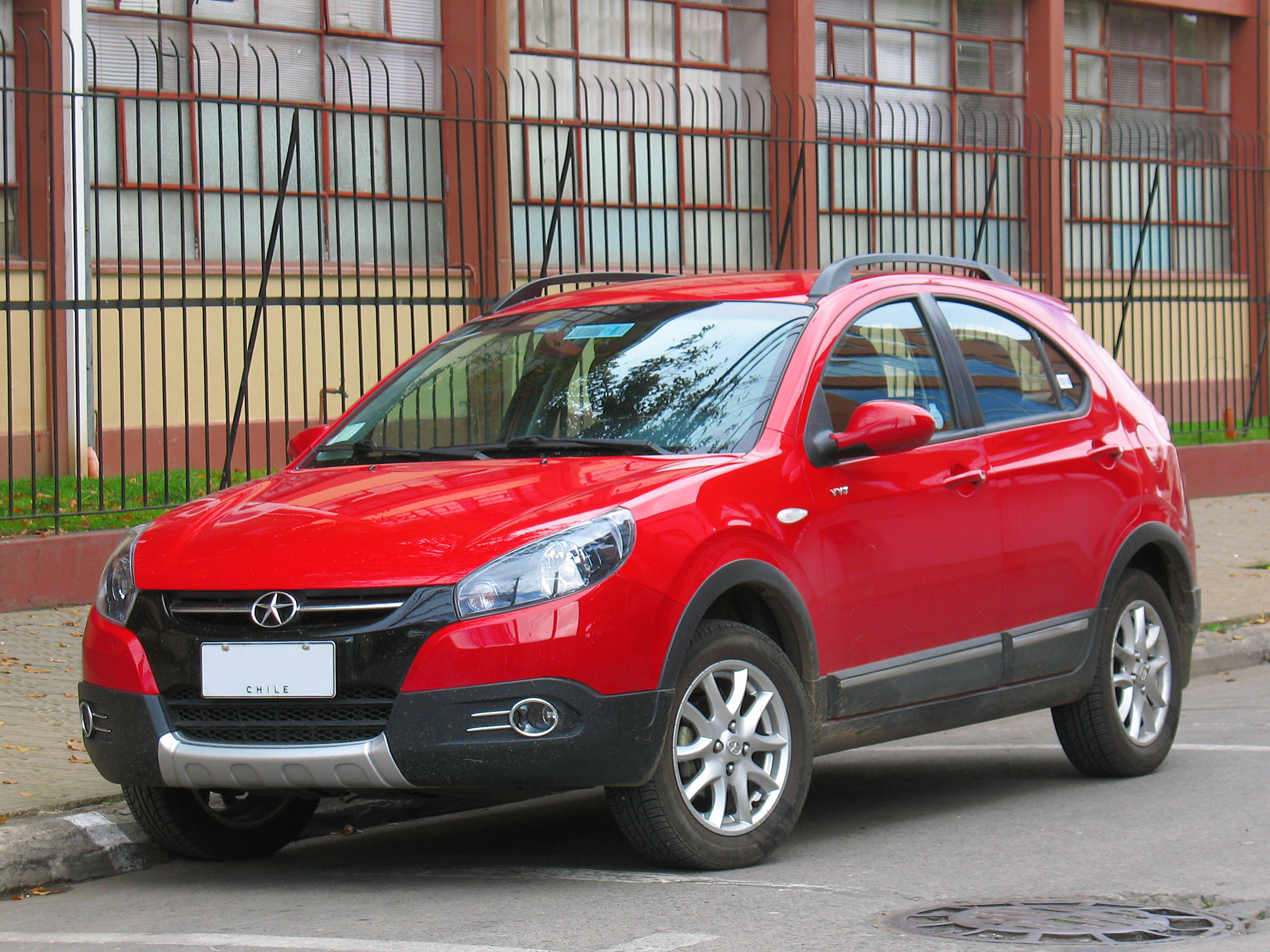
2013 J3 1.3 Cross, front

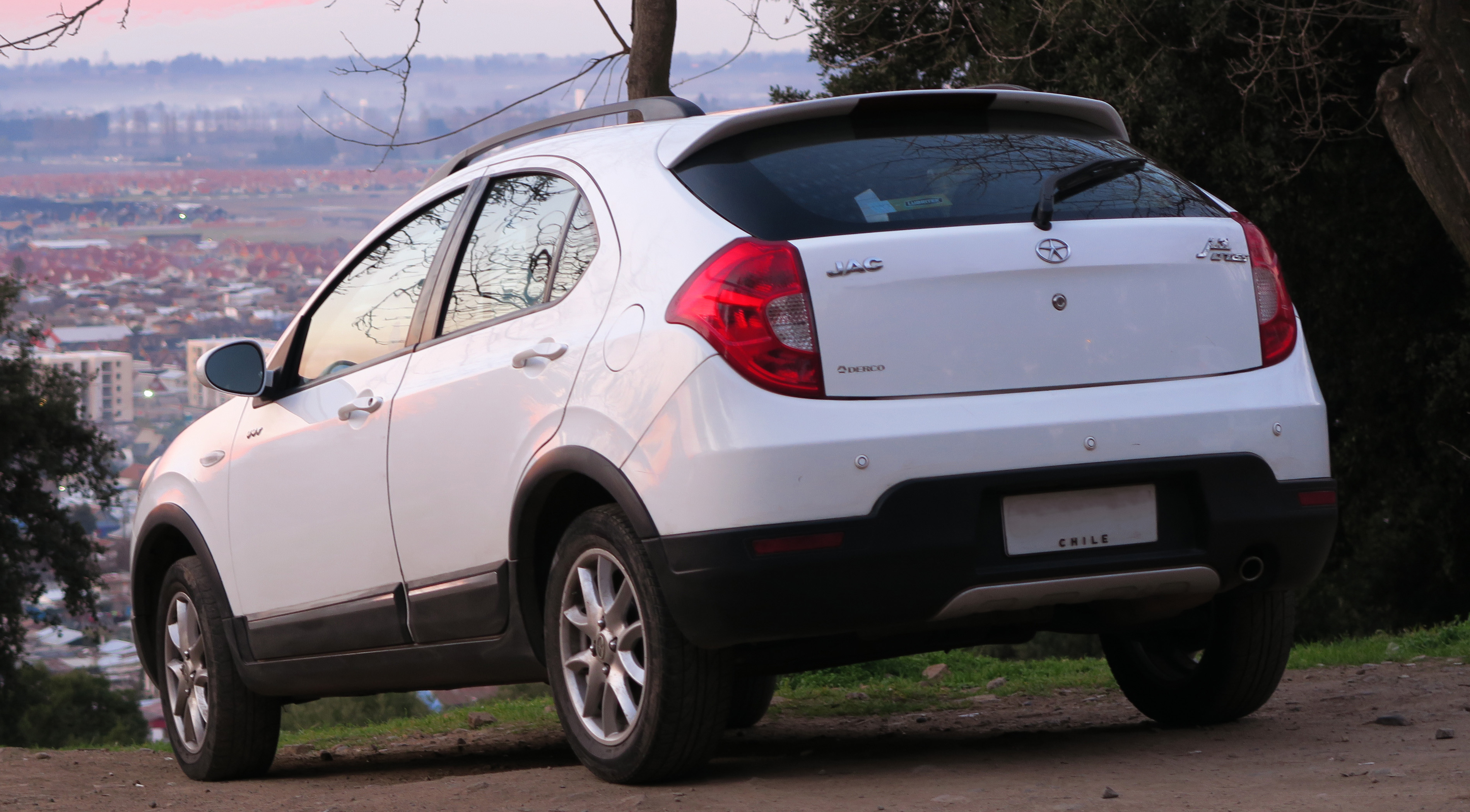
2014 J3 1.3 Cross, rear

== JAC iEV4 (EV) ==
An electric version of the Tongyue based on the regular Tongyue sedan was also available called the Tongyue EV. In 2011, the Tongyue EV had a range of 150 km (93 mi) and a weight of 1,200 kg (2,600 lb). Later renamed the iEV4, the electric car was developed on the basis of J3. The iEV4 has a 13-kilowatt electric motor with 170 Nm torque and a 19.2 kWh lithium-ion battery pack. At full charge, the sedan was stated by JAC to travel up to 160 km at a maximum speed of 95 km/h and up to 200 km, provided that the speed does not exceed 60 km/h. The battery may be charged in two ways: from an ordinary household network for 8 hours, or with a special charger for 2.5 hours.

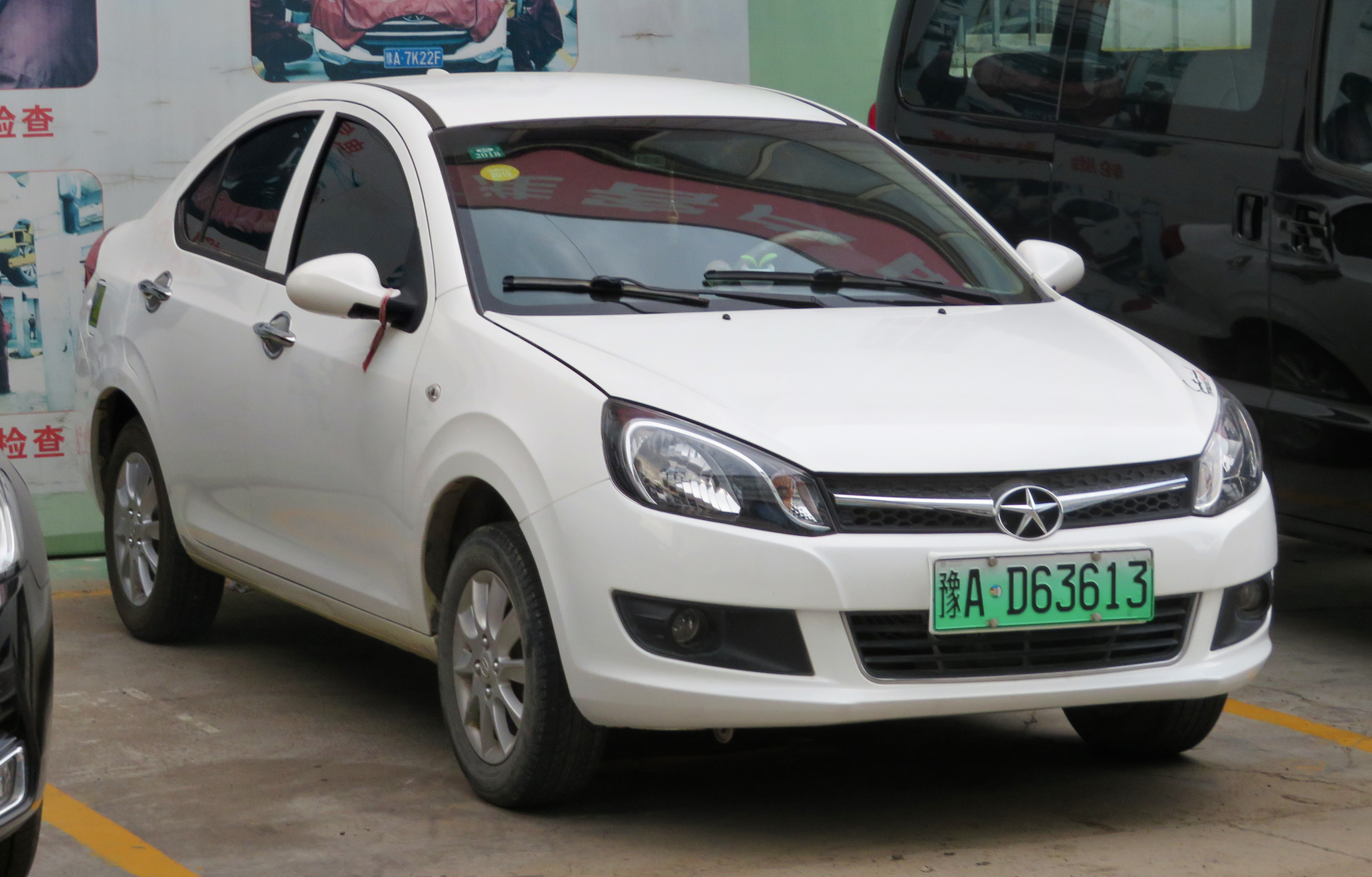
2018 JAC iEV4, front

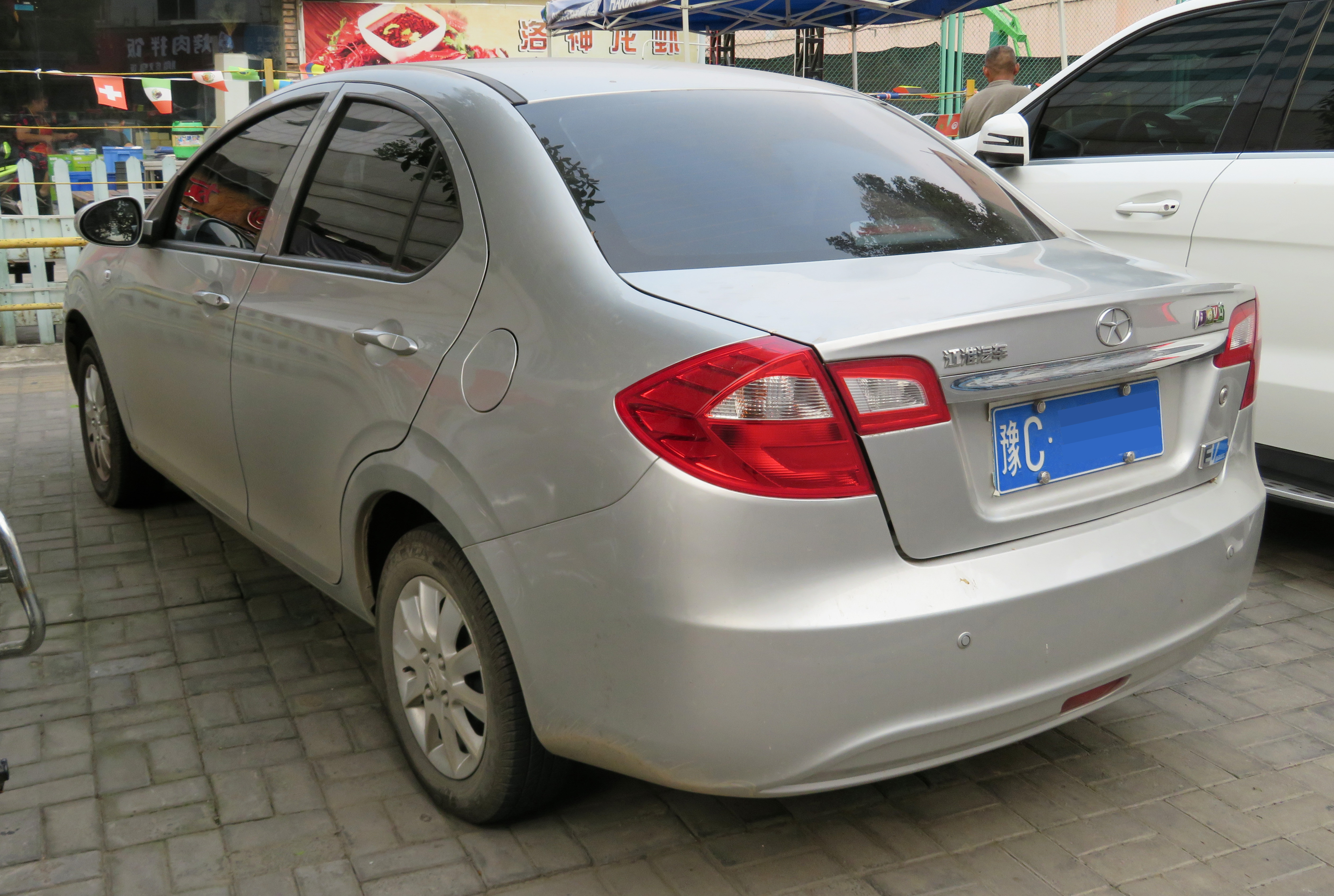
2017 JAC iEV4, rear

== Sales ==
Year	Brazil
2011	21,164
2012	13,129
2013	7,376
2014	4,012
2015	2,001
2016	858
2017	273
