= Speranza Motors =

Egyptian automobile manufacturer

- Founded: 1980
- Headquarters: Maadi, Cairo, Egypt
- Website: www.speranzaegypt.com

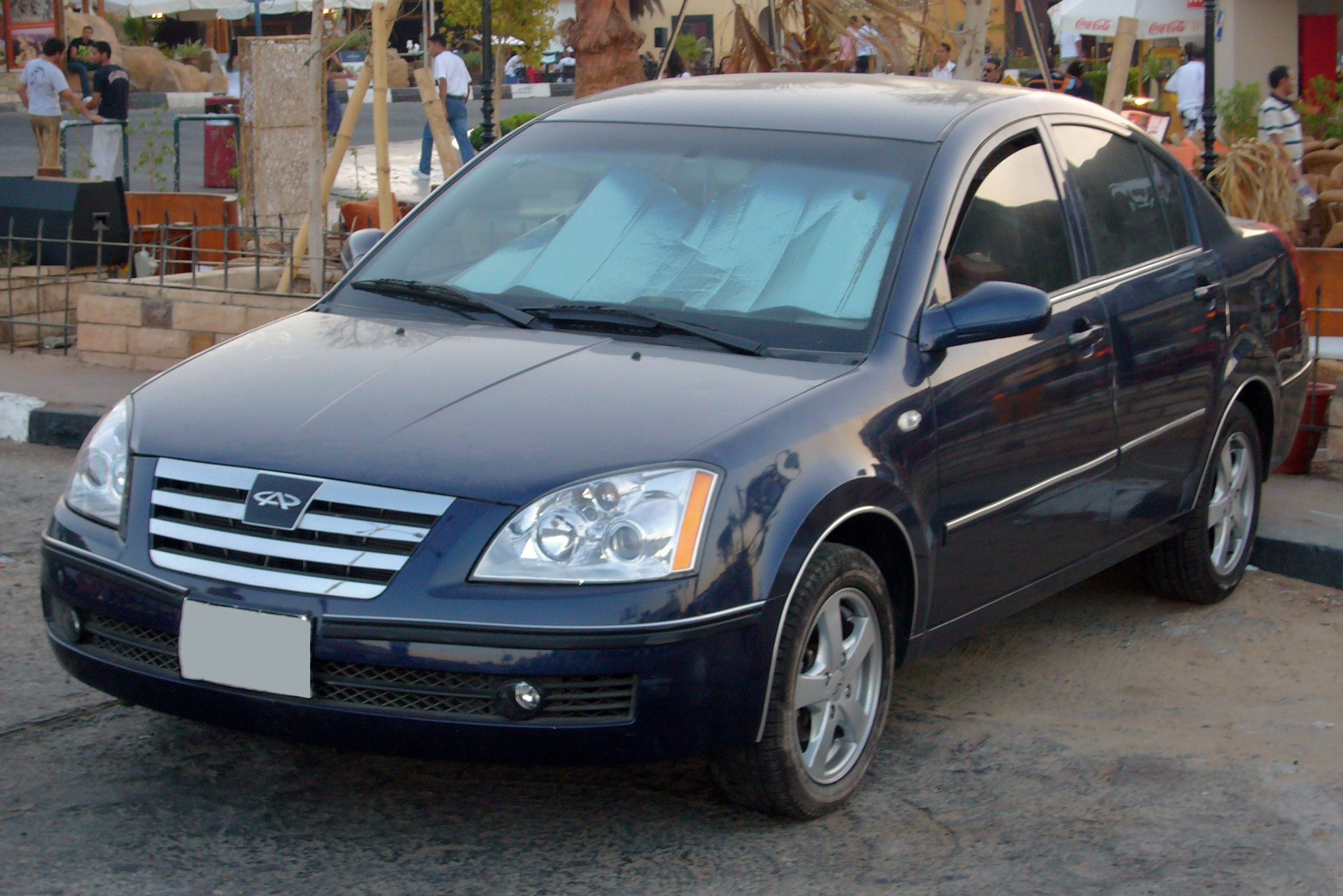
Speranza A516 in Sharm el-Sheikh

Speranza Motors, Ltd is an Egyptian auto manufacturer based in Maadi, Cairo. It is a part of the Daewoo Motor Egypt (DME) which itself belongs to the Aboul Fotouh Group. The factory is located in the 6th of October City.

The company started in the early 1980s as an importer of Japanese cars. The assembly plant started its activities with the SKD manufacturing of Daewoo vehicles in 1998. Since 2006 the company is assembling vehicles of the Chinese brand Chery. The cars were marketed under the Speranza brand. Since 2016, the Chery brand is used instead.
