= Passport (automobile dealership) =

Defunct Canadian automobile dealer network

Passport International Automobiles
- Industry: Automotive
- Founded: 1987; 39 years ago
- Defunct: 1991; 35 years ago
- Fate: Dissolved
- Successor: Asüna
- Parent: General Motors

Passport International Automobiles (PIA) or Passeport Automobiles Internationales (PAI) was a Canadian car dealership network owned by General Motors. It sold vehicles from Isuzu and Saab as well as its own branded Passport Optima (Passeport Optima in the French language area), a Korean (Daewoo) made badge engineered Opel Kadett E, starting in model year 1988. General Motors' Geo import brand was introduced in the United States at about the same time. Sales began in mid-1987, originally only in major metropolitan areas. Only 83 I-Marks and Optimas were sold in 1987.

== Overview ==
The Optima was offered in either hatchback or sedan and achieved 52mpg on the highway. It was designed by European Opel and had a slew of standard features for a relatively low price. The Optima sedan represented a minority of the sales, while the hatchback remains more common. However, fewer than 500 Optimas were registered for road use in Canada as of 2012. Sales of the Optima were rather slow and with relatively low survival rates, the Optima is a rare sight today. Very few pictures document the existence of the Optima. Passport also distributed the Isuzu I-Mark, the Isuzu Trooper, and the Isuzu Pickup. Sales in 1988 were 2,006 Optima and I-Mark, 2,150 trucks. In 1989 sales more than doubled, to 5,087 cars and 4,204 trucks. GM's new, import-fighting Saturn division chose Passport to sell its new car beginning in mid-1992.

General Motors Canada, however, changed its branding strategy in 1991 and disbanded the Passport division. The Optima sedan and hatchbacks were rebadged as the Asüna SE and Asüna GT. Isuzu was grouped together with Saab and Saturn to form Saturn-Saab-Isuzu dealerships.

Passport's sibling, Geo, carried on until 1998 while another GM import brand, Asüna, debuted for model year 1992 but lasted only two model years.

== Models ==
- Passport Optima
- Isuzu I-Mark
- Isuzu Impulse
- Isuzu Rodeo
- Isuzu Stylus
- Isuzu Trooper

== Gallery ==
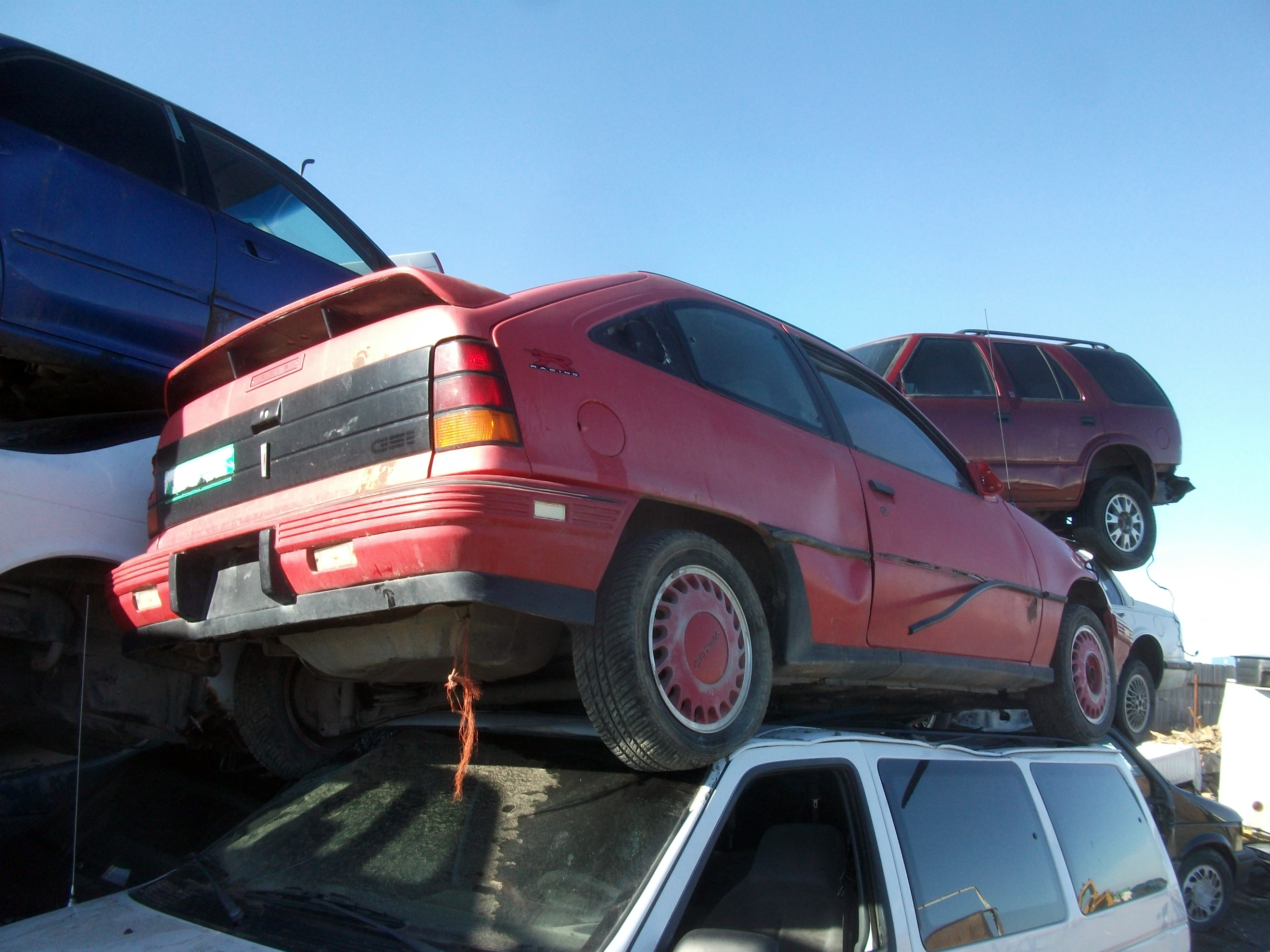
Passport Optima GSi in a junkyard

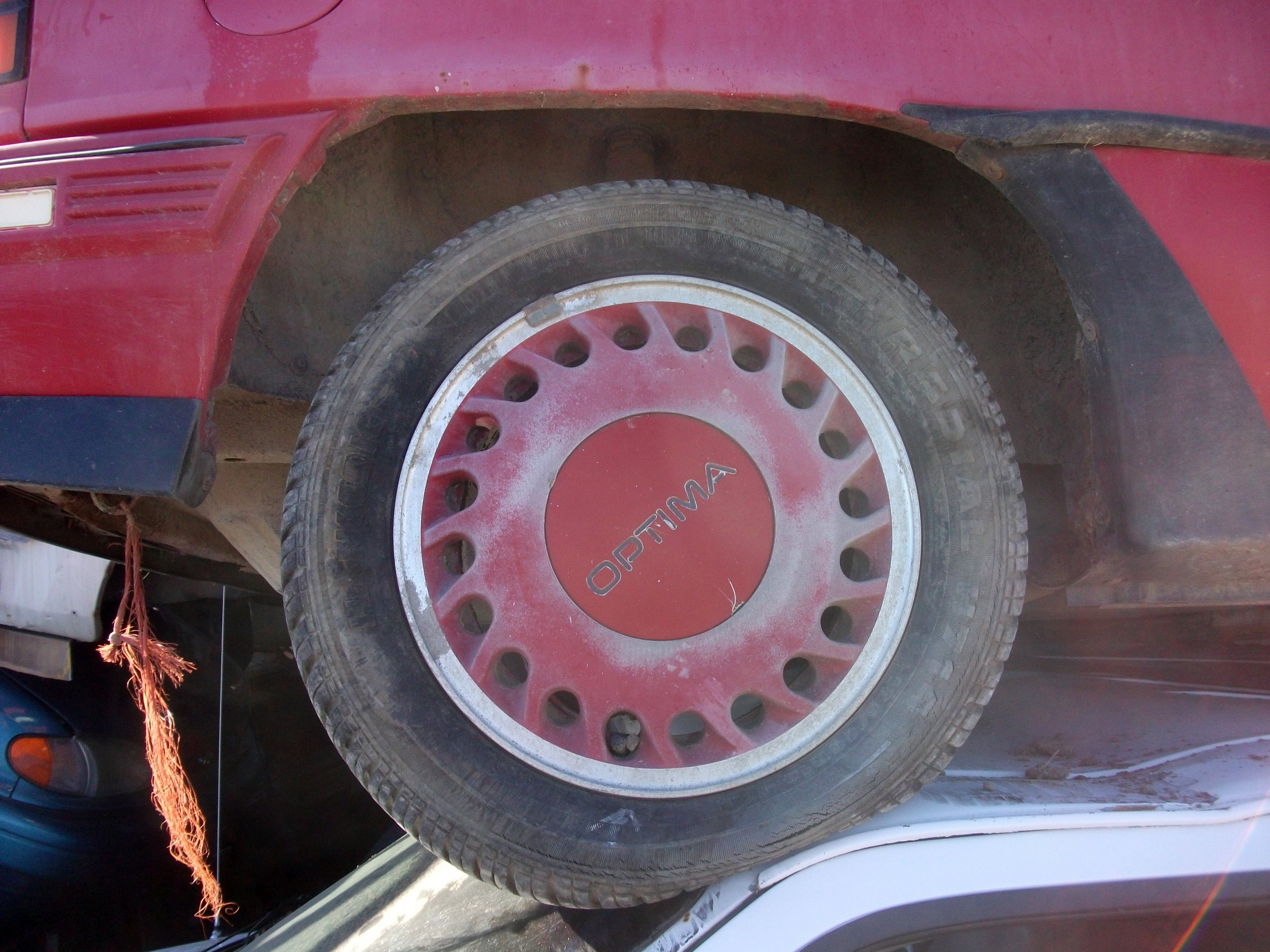
Passport Optima GSi wheel

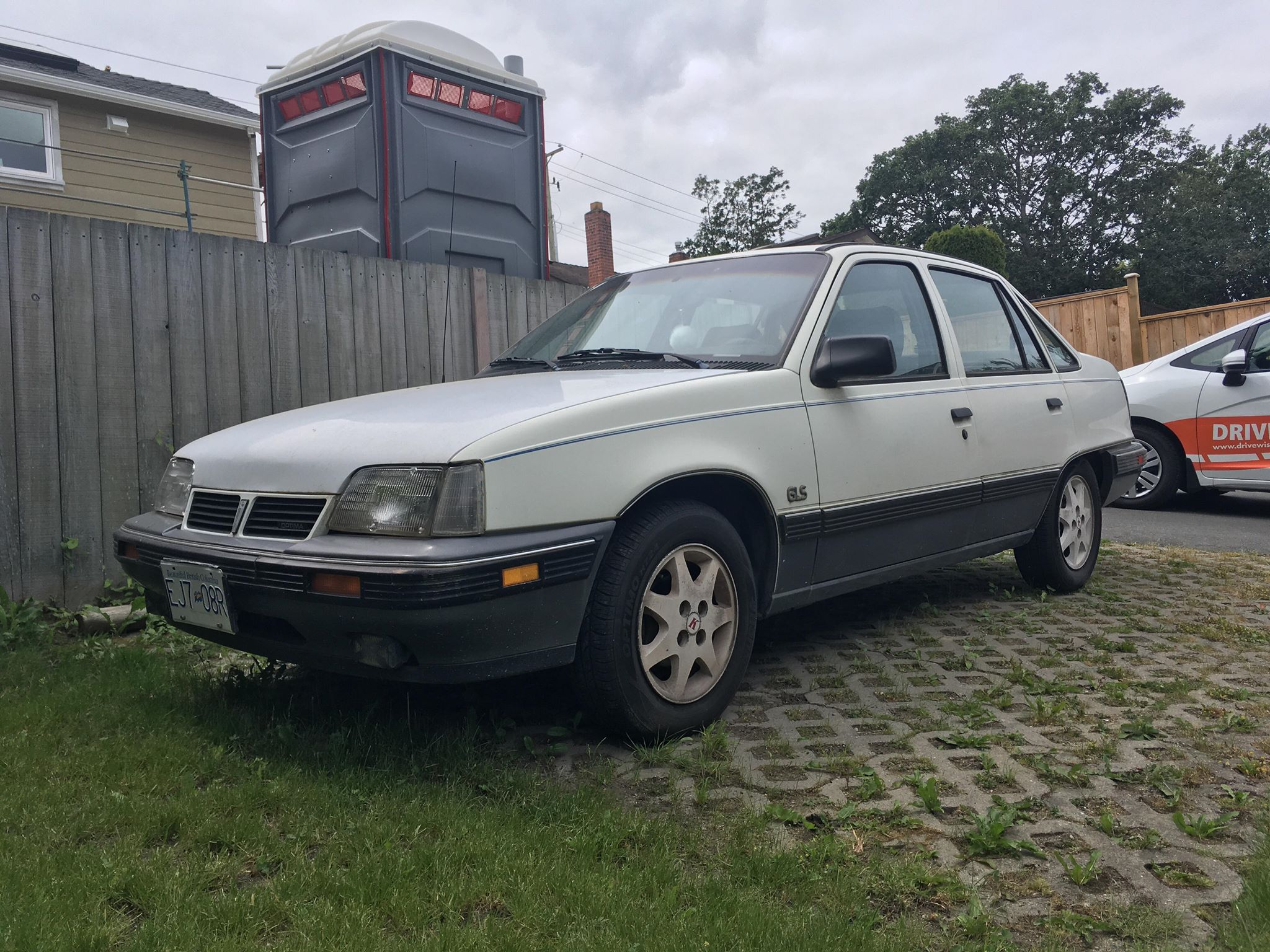
Passport Optima GLS Sedan front

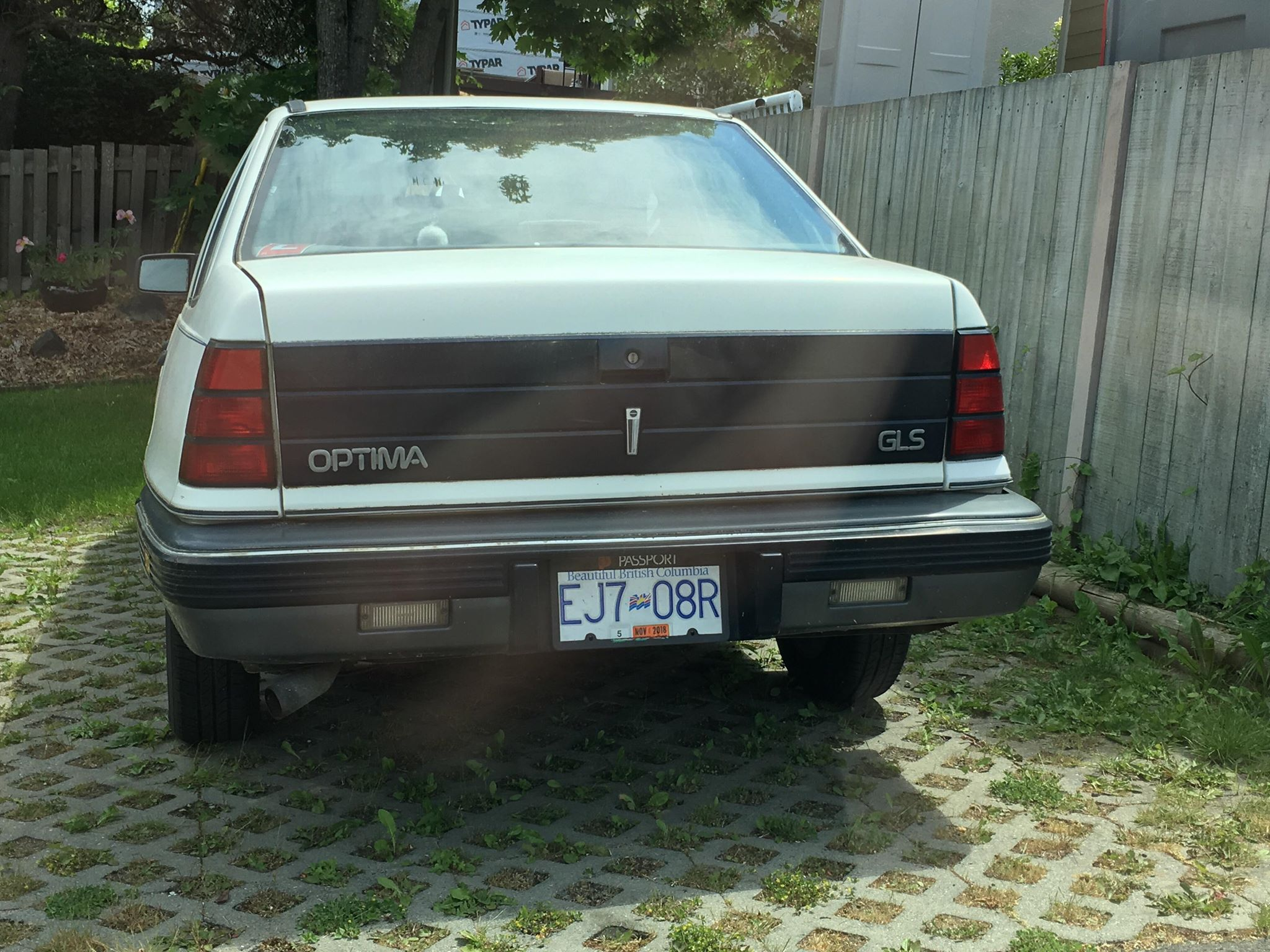
Passport Optima GLS Sedan rear

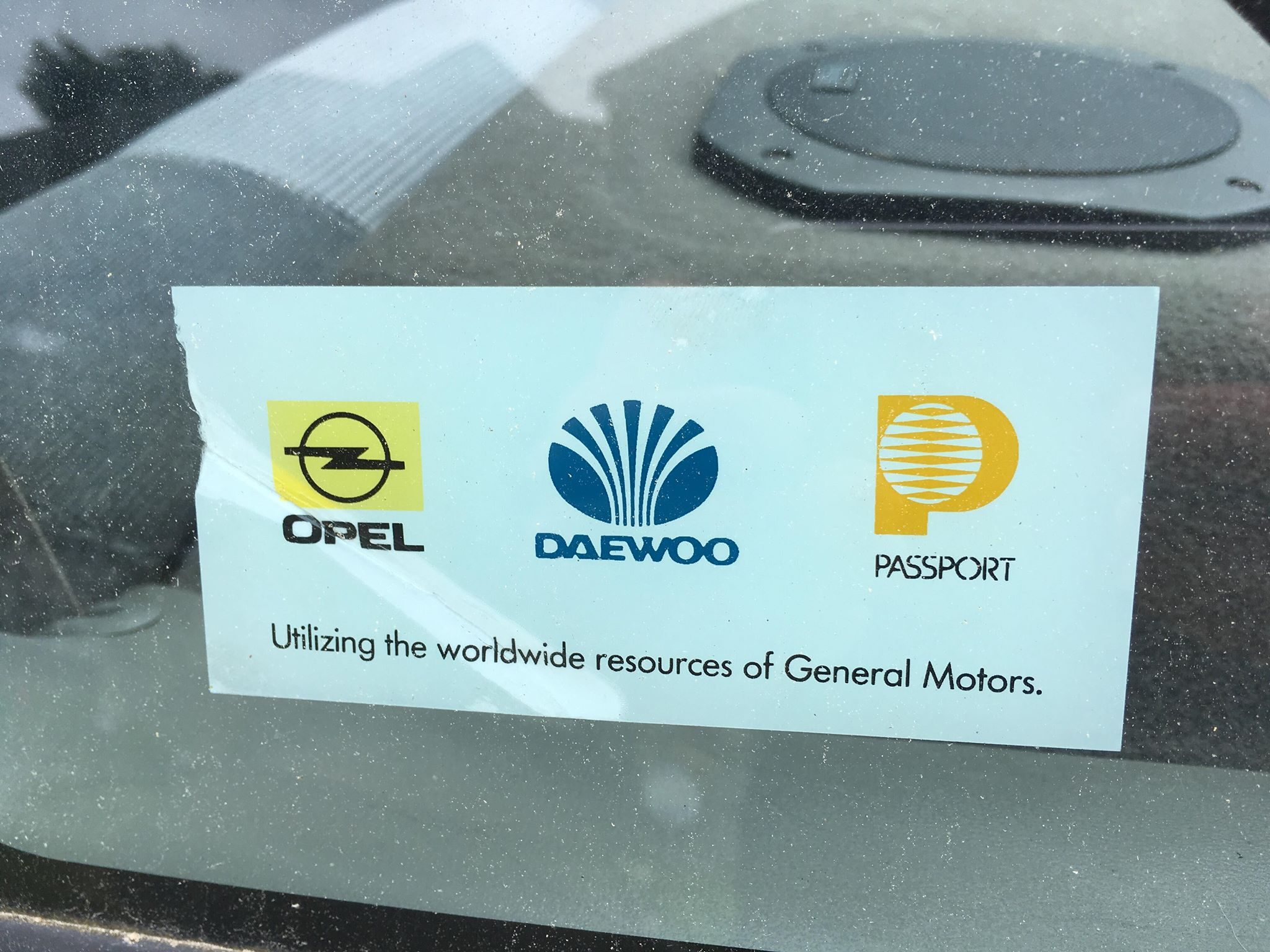
Passport window sticker
