= Daewoo LeMans =

South Korean compact car

Daewoo LeMans Daewoo Cielo
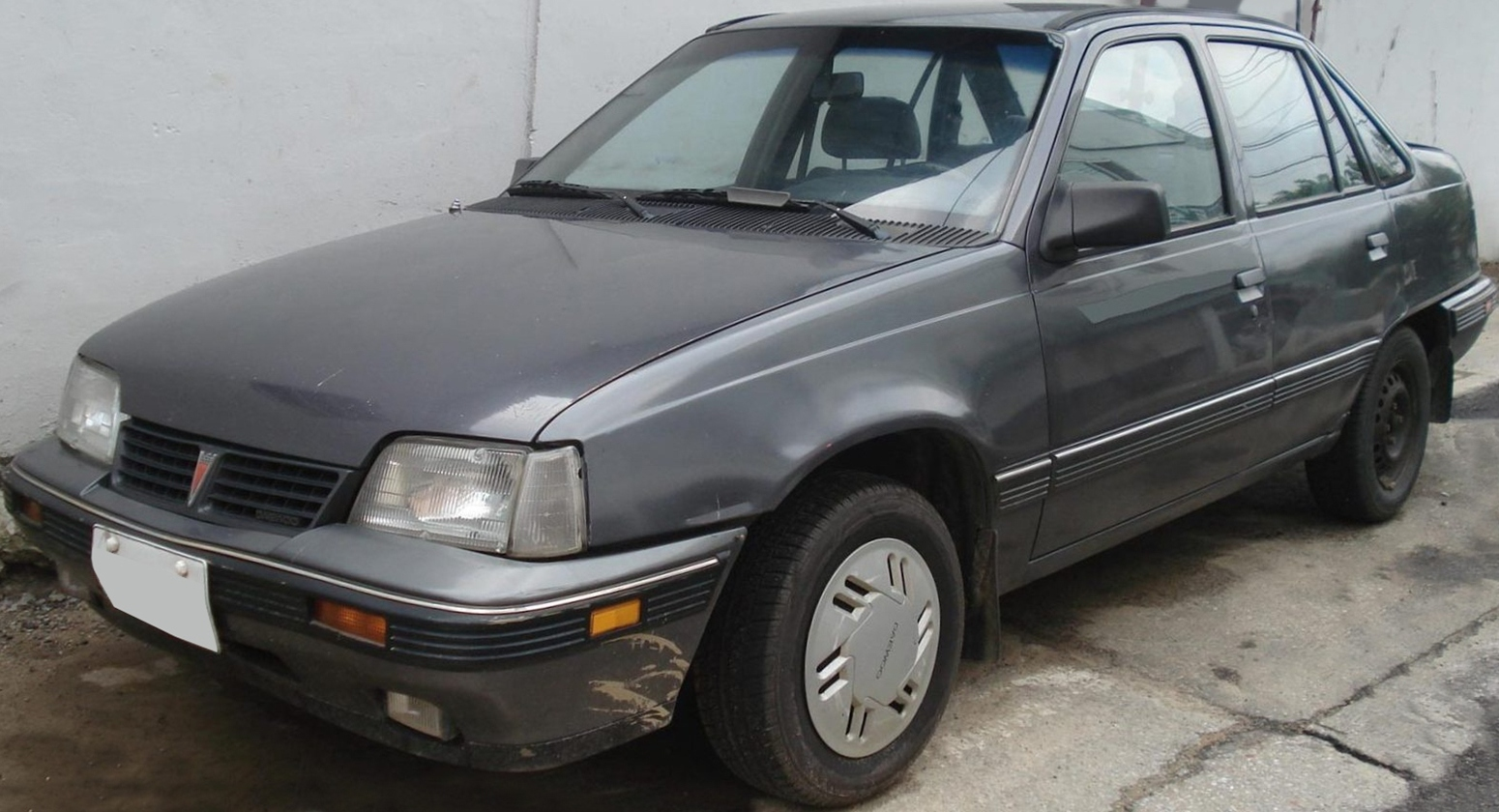
- Daewoo LeMans

Overview
- Manufacturer: Daewoo
- Production: 1986–1997 (South Korea); 1996–2007 (Romania); 1995–2016 (license-built models)

Body and chassis
- Class: Compact car/small family car (C)
- Body style: 3/5-door hatchback 4-door sedan
- Layout: Front-engine, front-wheel-drive
- Platform: GM T platform
- Related: Opel Kadett E

Chronology
- Predecessor: Daewoo Maepsy; Pontiac Acadian; Pontiac T-1000; Pontiac Sunburst (Canada)
- Successor: Daewoo Lanos; Daewoo Nubira

The Daewoo LeMans is a compact car, first manufactured by Daewoo in South Korea between 1986 and 1994, and between 1994 and 1997 as Daewoo Cielo — a car mechanically identical to the LeMans, differentiated only by its modified styling cues. Like all Daewoos preceding it, the LeMans took its underpinnings from a European Opel design. In the case of the LeMans, the GM T platform-based Opel Kadett E was the donor vehicle, essentially just badge engineered into the form of the LeMans, and later as the Cielo after a second more thorough facelift.

In markets outside South Korea, the original version of the car bore the Asüna GT, Asüna SE, Daewoo 1.5i, Daewoo Fantasy, Daewoo Pointer, Daewoo Racer, Passport Optima and Pontiac LeMans names. The "LeMans" nameplate was not used at all for the facelifted model. Five-door hatchback models exported to Europe were badged Daewoo Nexia with the Daewoo Racer name used seemingly at random on various bodystyles. The Daewoo Heaven name has also been used.

The Cielo was subsequently replaced by the subcompact Daewoo Lanos and the compact Nubira in 1997, except in Russia where the production lasted from 1996 to 1998 and Uzbekistan where the production started in 1996 and lasted until the end of 2016. In Uzbekistan, the local manufacturer UzDaewoo Motors (later GM Uzbekistan, now UzAuto Motors) produced exclusively the second generation of the LeMans and badged it as Daewoo Nexia.

== First generation (LeMans; 1986) ==
Daewoo LeMans
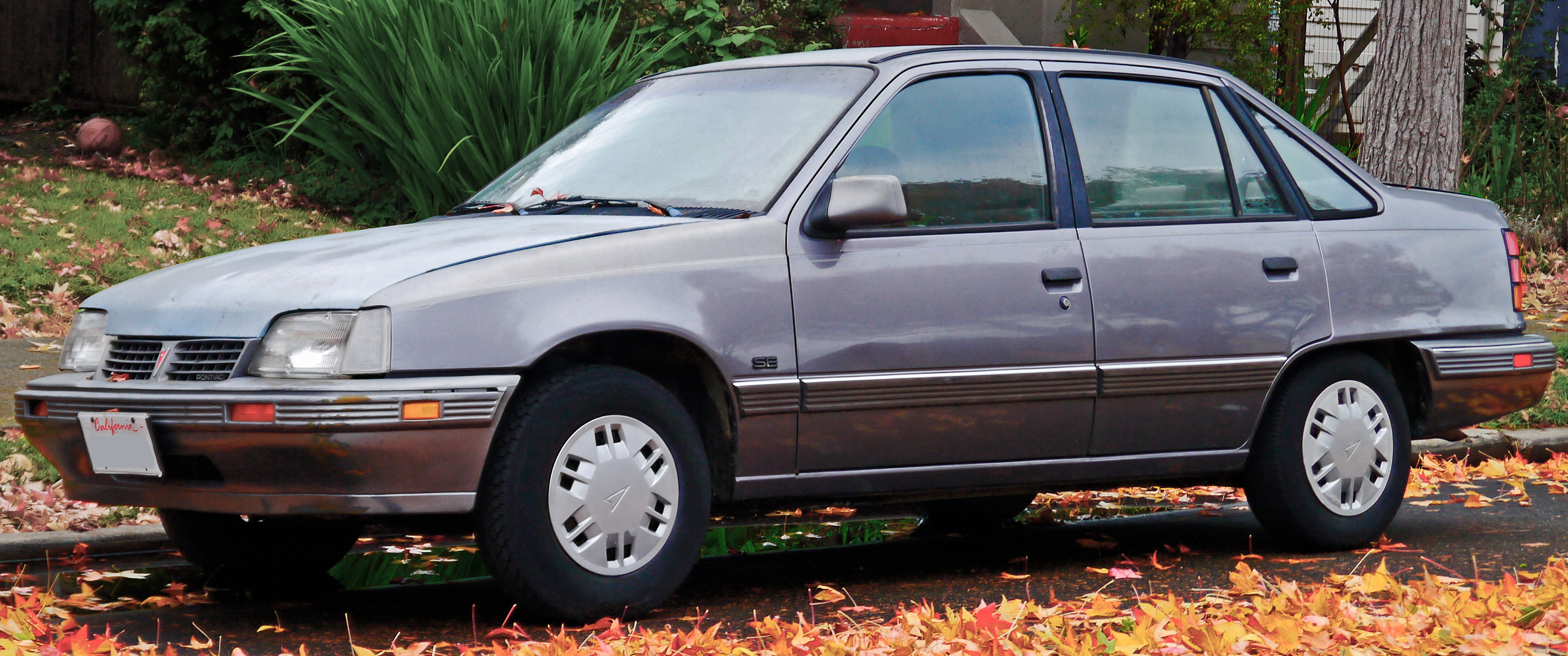
- 1988 Pontiac LeMans sedan (United States)

Overview
- Also called: Asüna GT/SE (Canada, 1993); Daewoo 1.5i (Australia, 1994–1995); Daewoo Fantasy (Thailand); Daewoo Pointer; Daewoo Racer; Guangtong GTQ5010X (China; JV); Passport Optima (Canada, 1988–1991); Pontiac LeMans (USA and NZ)
- Production: July 1986 – February 1997
- Assembly: South Korea: Bupyeong, Incheon; China: Zhanjiang, Guangdong

Body and chassis
- Class: Compact car/small family car (C)
- Body style: 3/5-door hatchback 4-door sedan
- Layout: Front-engine, front-wheel-drive
- Platform: GM T platform
- Related: Opel Kadett E

Powertrain
- Engine: Petrol: 1.5 L G15CF/SF/MF I4; 1.5 L G15LF LPG I4 (Taxi models); 1.5 L A15MF I4; 1.6 L L73 I4; 1.6 L G16SF I4; 2.0 L C20LZ (LT2) I4
- Transmission: 4/5-speed manual 3-speed automatic

Dimensions
- Wheelbase: 2,520 mm (99.2 in)
- Length: 4,260 mm (167.7 in)
- Width: 1,662 mm (65.4 in)
- Height: 1,393 mm (54.8 in)

Chronology
- Predecessor: Daewoo Maepsy-Na

The original series Daewoo LeMans was available as a three-door hatchback and a four-door sedan when introduced in July 1986. The LeMans was one of the first aerodynamically designed cars to be sold in South Korea, and the first to feature a digital dashboard. The hatchbacks' bodywork differed in subtle ways from the German models: unlike the original, the three-door model received swing-out rear windows (not on the lowest priced models), while the five-door design used the sedan's rear doors and sloping C-pillars rather than retaining the three-door's notched window line.

Sales of the LeMans in North America began in mid-1987, where it was sold as the Pontiac LeMans. The LeMans was also sold in Canada through General Motors' Passport International Division as the "Optima."

This car was sold in Australia as the "Daewoo 1.5i", with both hatchback and sedan bodywork.

The five-door hatchback body style was known as the Daewoo LeMans Penta5 in South Korea, while the three-door was called Daewoo Racer and only the sedan was called LeMans. Korean market cars received a 1.5-litre engine (with 89 PS or 65 kW) as there was a severe tax penalty for cars with larger engines. In October 1991 the LeMans received a facelift, with a reworked front and superficially changed taillights. This version was called the Asüna SE/GT in the Canadian market, where it replaced the Passport Optima. When South Korean production of the original LeMans finally came to an end in February 1997, over 1 million had been built.

=== Pontiac LeMans ===
For the 1988 model year, Pontiac began selling the LeMans as their smallest model in the United States, thereby reviving the LeMans nameplate. The captive import was offered in three-door hatchback and four-door sedan bodystyles. In Canada, GM rebranded the LeMans to market it through its short-lived Passport and Asüna brands. The Pontiac LeMans received a facelift in 1991. In North America, poor quality tarnished sales and the Pontiac LeMans and Asüna SE/GT were discontinued after the 1993 model year with no replacement. In 1994, the Asüna brand was discontinued altogether.

It was also sold in New Zealand as the Pontiac LeMans from 1989, becoming the first Pontiac badged car to be sold on the NZ market since the Canadian sourced Pontiac Laurentian of the 1960s.

=== Daewoo Racer ===
Following a complex debt deal between Czechoslovakia, Libya and South Korea, Mototechna the state car dealer imported the Daewoo Racer for 1988 and 1989 in the 1.5 saloon version.

=== Engines ===
Model	Engine Code	Years	Displacement	Weight	Power	Torque	0–100 km/h (0-62 mph)	Emissions
L4 1.5l	A15MF	1986–1994	1498 cc					Non-Euro
L4 1.6l	G16SF	1986–1994	1598 cc					Non-Euro
L4 2.0l	C20LZ	1986–1994	1998 cc					Non-Euro

=== Gallery ===
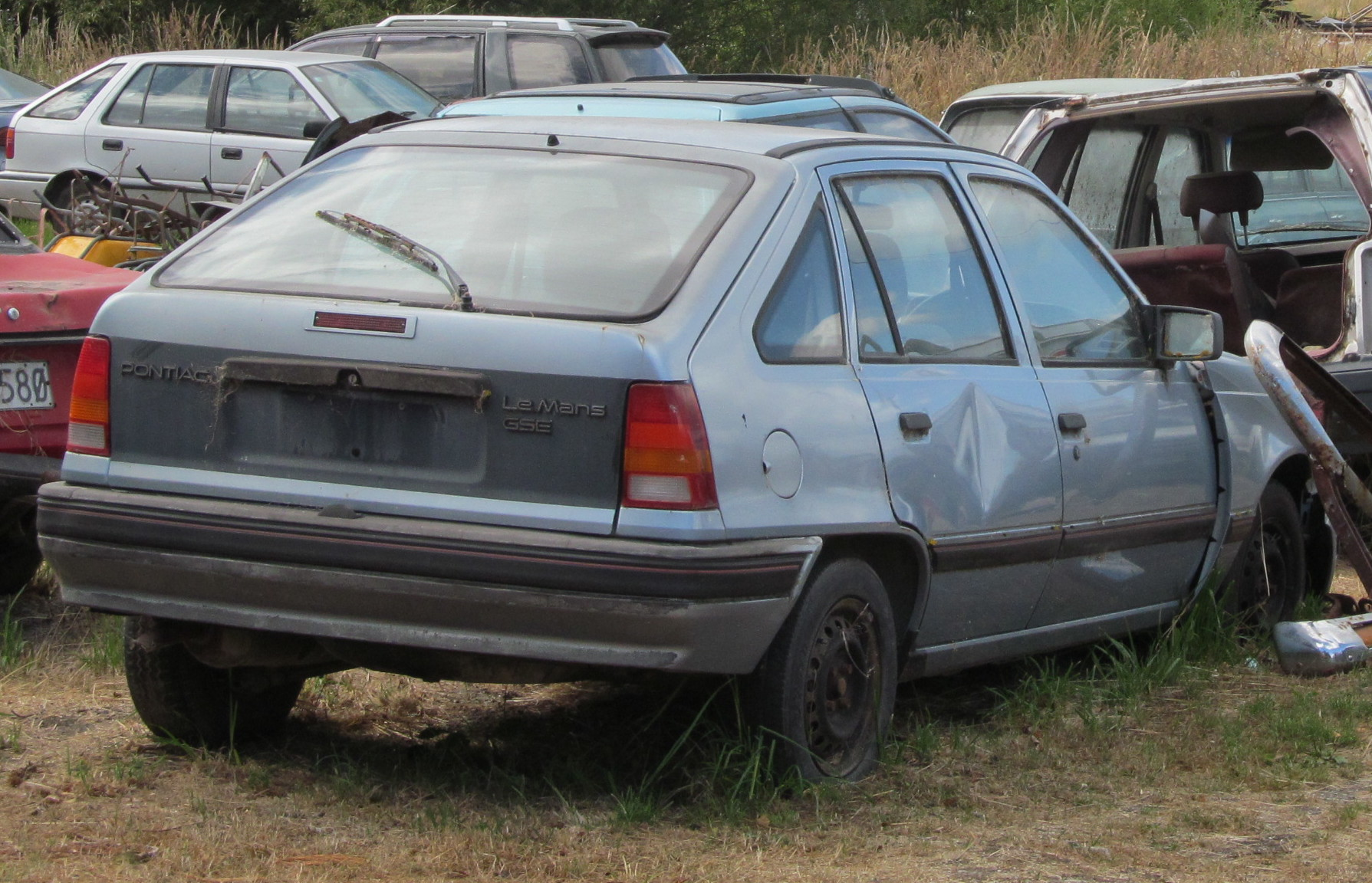
Pontiac LeMans hatchback (New Zealand)

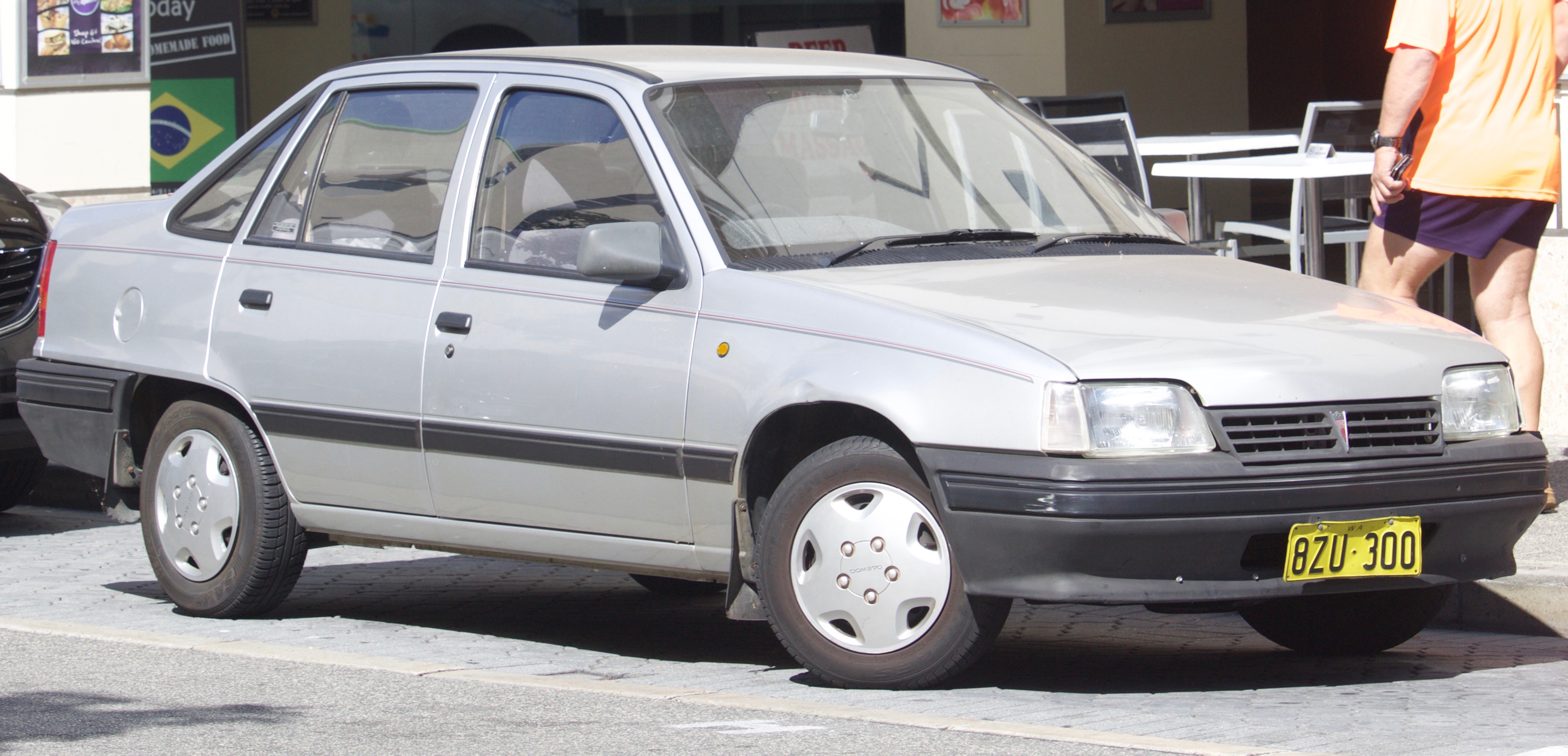
Pre-facelift Daewoo 1.5i (Australia)

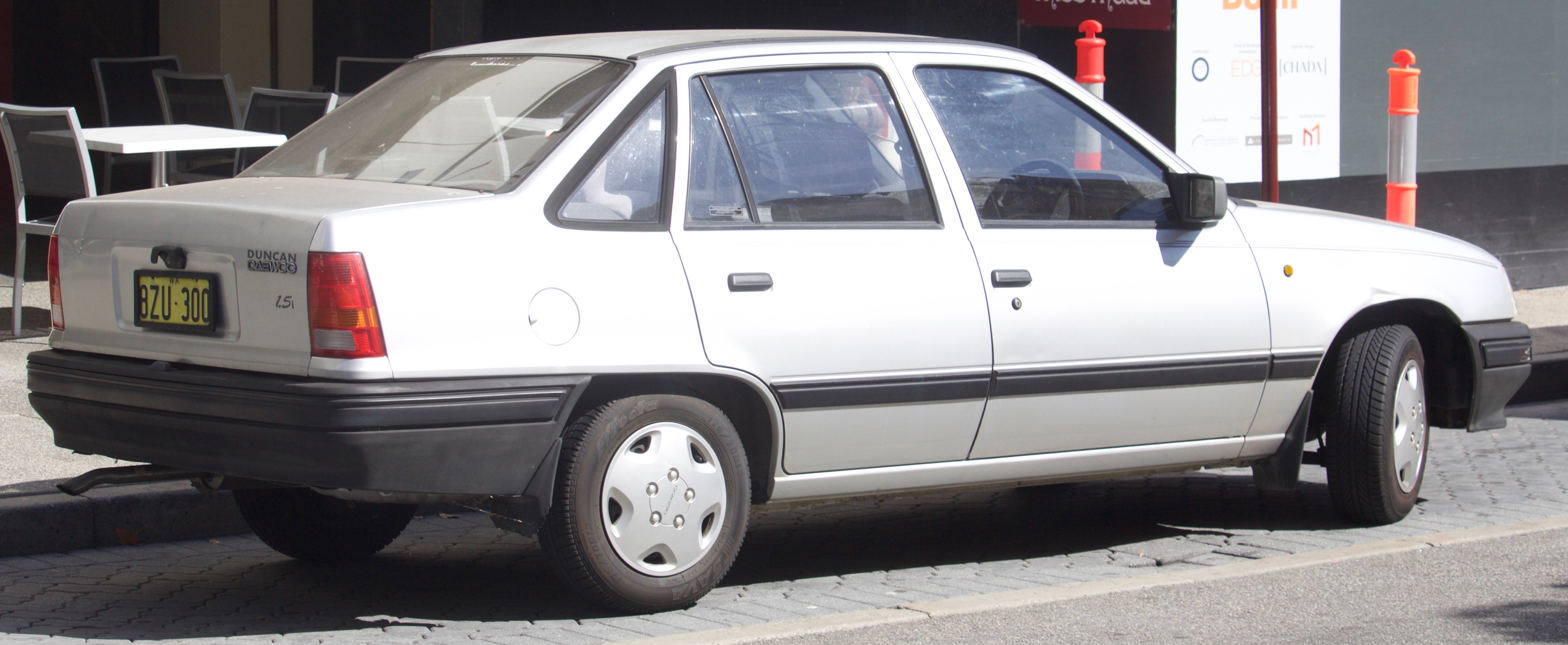
Pre-facelift Daewoo 1.5i (Australia)

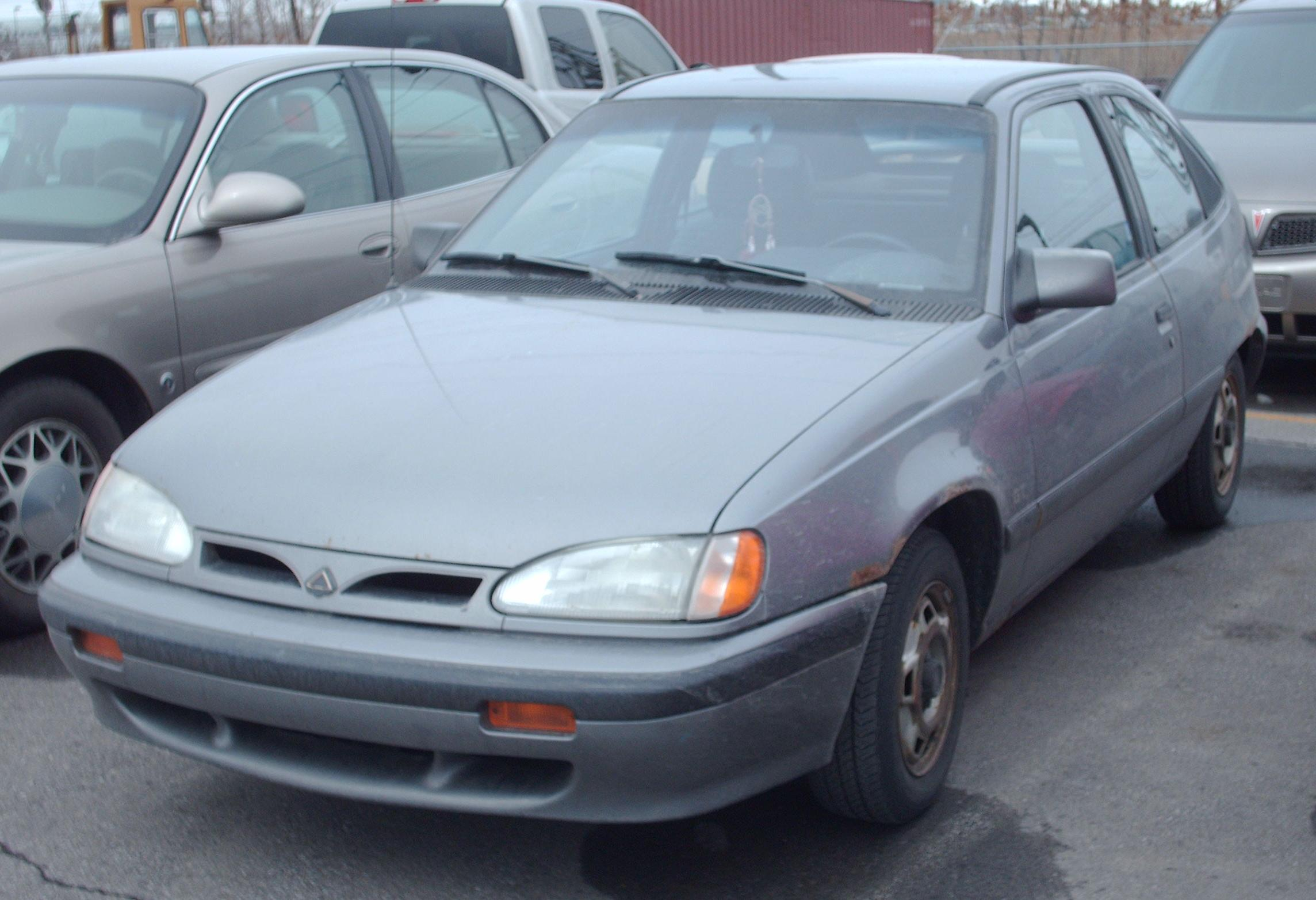
Asüna GT hatchback facelift (Canada)

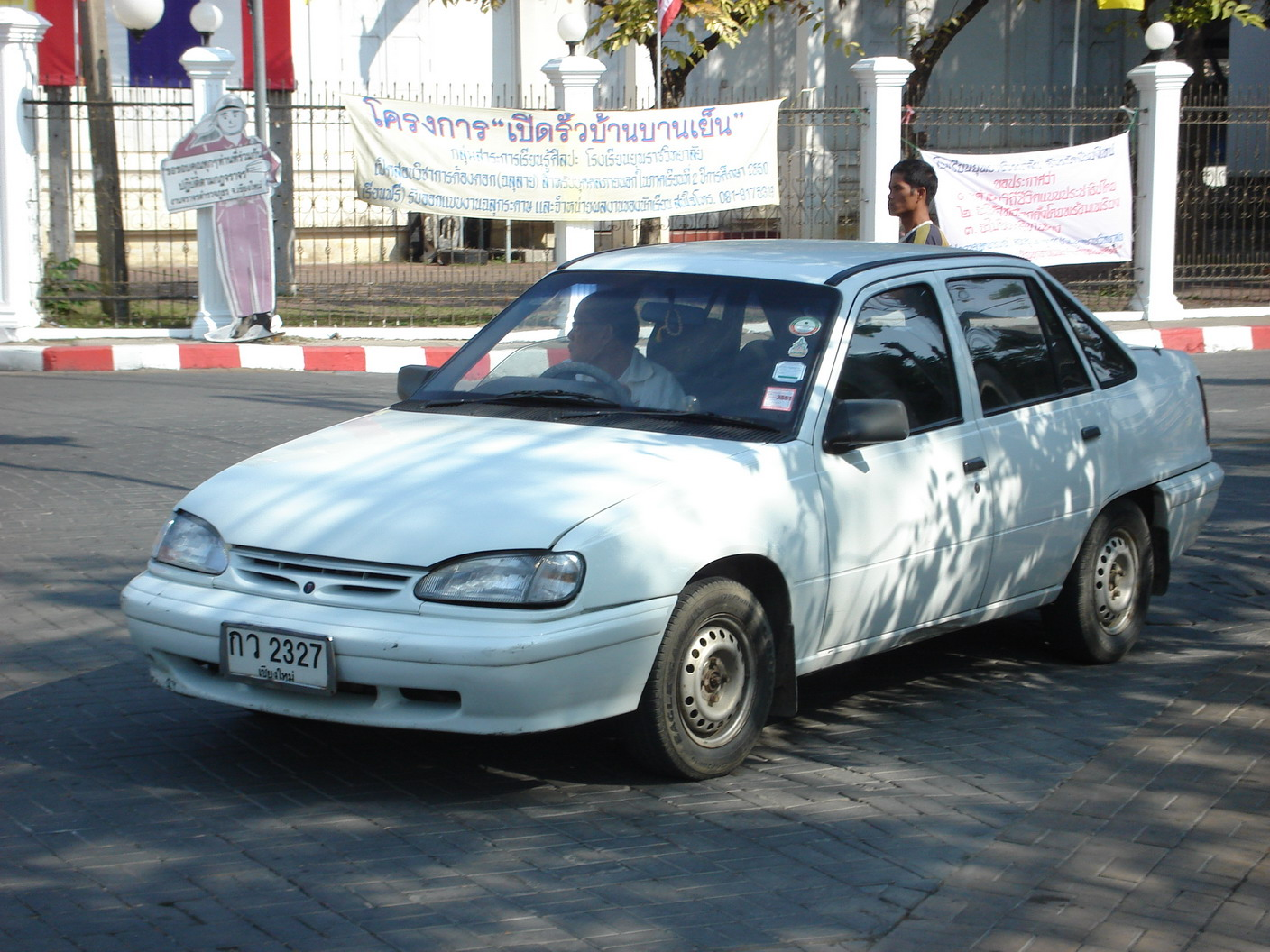
Daewoo Fantasy sedan facelift (Thailand)

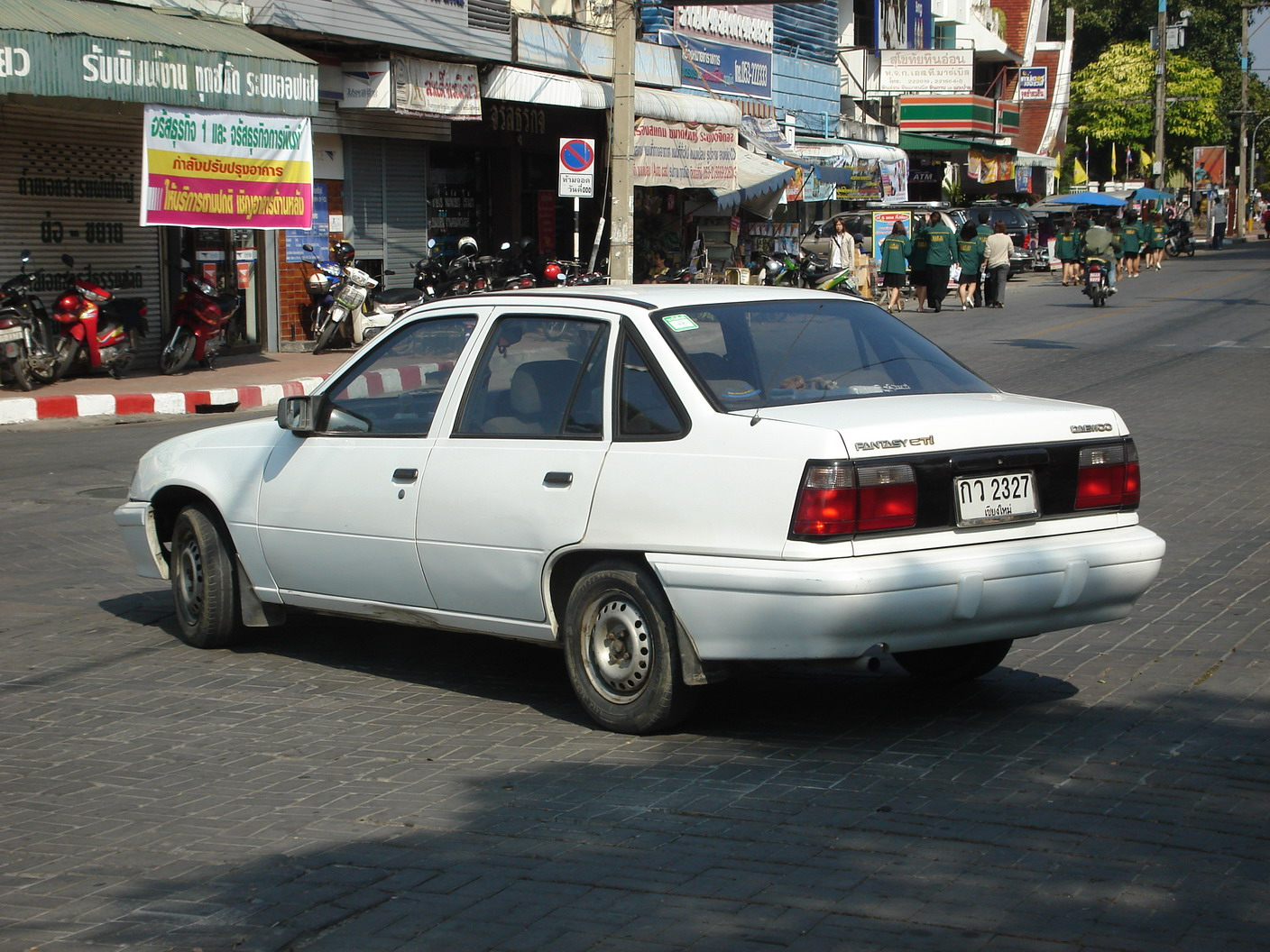
Daewoo Fantasy sedan facelift (Thailand)

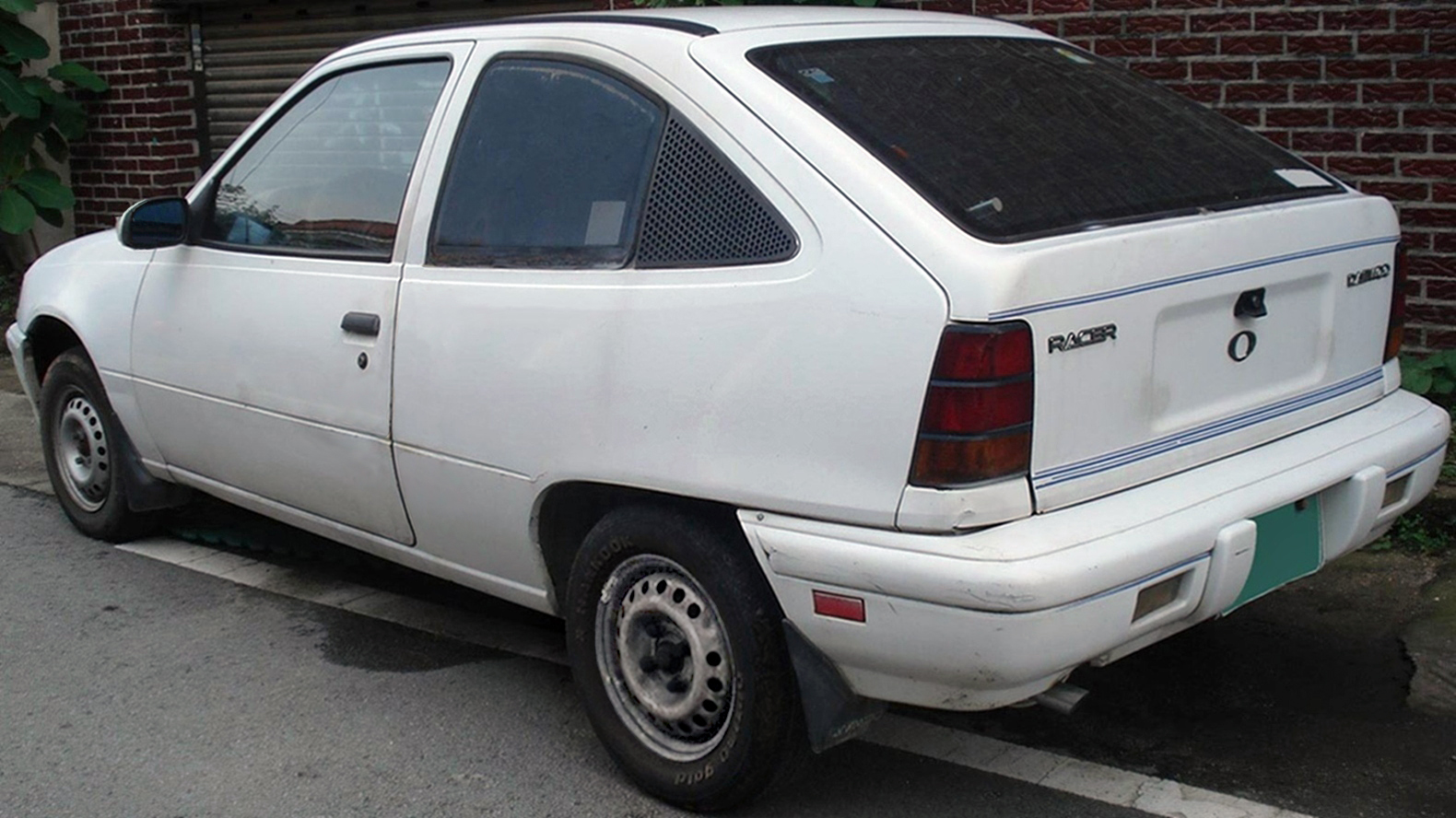
Daewoo Racer van facelift

== Second generation (Cielo; 1994) ==
Daewoo Cielo
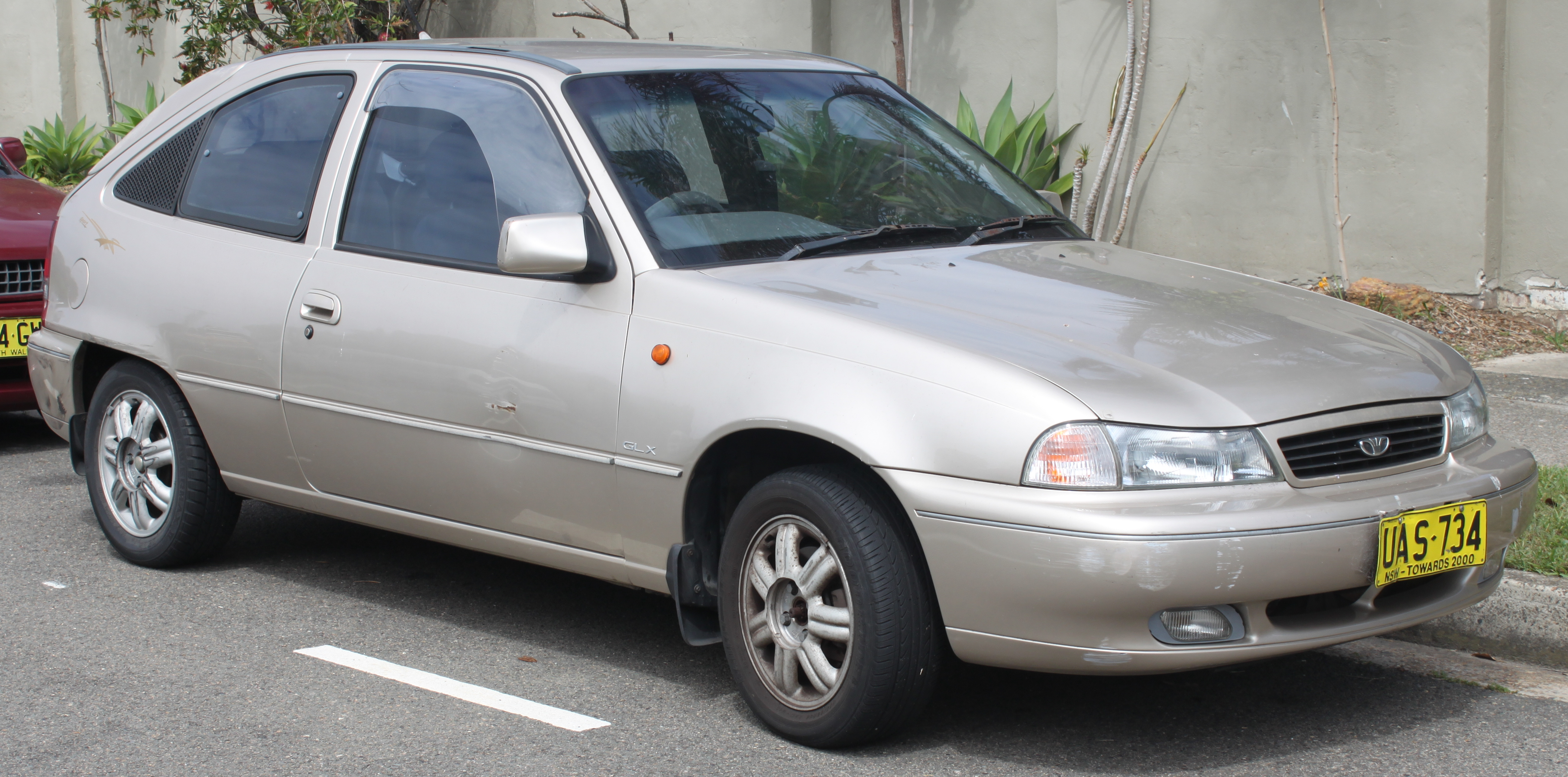
- 1995 Daewoo Cielo GLX 3-door

Overview
- Also called: Daewoo Cielo (South Korea, Romania); Daewoo Heaven; Daewoo Nexia; Daewoo Pointer; Daewoo Racer; Chevrolet Nexia (Uzbekistan)
- Production: May 1994 – February 1997 (South Korea); 1995–2002 (Vietnam); 1996–2008 (Egypt); 1996–2007 (Romania); 1996–2004 (Iran); 1996–2016 (Uzbekistan)
- Assembly: South Korea: Bupyeong; South Korea: Changwon (export models only); Egypt: Cairo (Daewoo Motors Egypt); Uzbekistan: Asaka (UzDaewoo); Romania: Craiova (Rodae); Poland: Lublin (DMP); Vietnam: Hanoi (VIDAMCO); Iran: Kerman
- Designer: Concept Group International LTD and GM Uzbekistan (2008 facelift)

Body and chassis
- Class: Compact car/small family car (C)
- Body style: 3/5-door hatchback 4-door sedan
- Layout: Front-engine, front-wheel-drive
- Platform: GM T platform
- Related: Opel Kadett E

Powertrain
- Engine: Petrol: 1.5 L G15MF I4; 1.5 L A15MF I4; 1.6 L Family 1 I4
- Transmission: 5-speed manual 3-speed GM THM125 automatic 4-speed GM 4T40E automatic

Dimensions
- Wheelbase: 2,520 mm (99.2 in)
- Length: 4,482 mm (176.5 in) (sedan); 4,256 mm (167.6 in) (hatchback)
- Width: 1,662 mm (65.4 in)
- Height: 1,393 mm (54.8 in)

Chronology
- Successor: Daewoo Lanos; Daewoo Nubira; Chevrolet Agile (South America)

The second generation LeMans launched in 1994, available as a three- and five-door hatchback and four-door sedan with a 1.5-litre eight-valve or a 1.5-litre 16-valve engine. These new models were still based on the Opel Kadett E, underpinned by the "T-car" platform. There were various trim levels available. Unlike the Kadett, there was never a station wagon version available. Some European markets got the "Lifestyle" trim level; Spain and Portugal badged their GLi/GLXi equivalents "Chess"; the Benelux countries kept the GLi/GLXi trim levels and some markets added ETi and STi specifications. The GLi has an average performance with a 0–100 km/h time of 12.5 seconds and 80 PS (59 kW) at 5,400 rpm. There was also a version with single-point fuel injection and 70 PS (51 kW) for lower-spec versions. The more luxurious GLXi received a sixteen-valve engine which upped the power to 90 PS (66 kW) at an unusually low 4,800 rpm, and the 0–100 km/h time was reduced to 12.2 seconds.

The Cielo was made in India by DCM Daewoo Motors until the Korean Daewoo company went bankrupt. GM did not take over the Indian plant in Surajpur near Delhi and it was liquidated. Production in South Korea came to an end shortly after the 1996 introduction of the Daewoo Lanos, an original design.

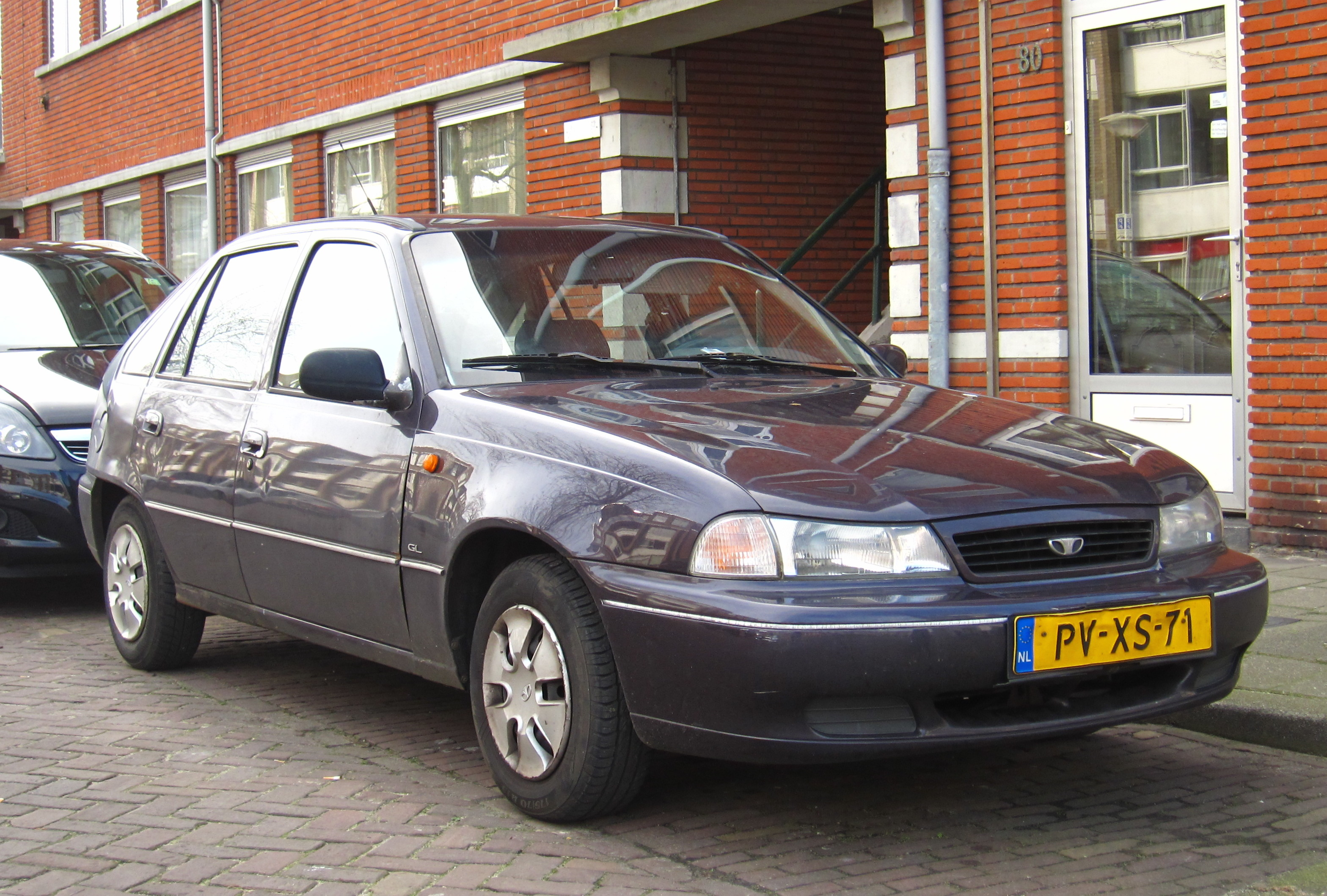
Daewoo Nexia 5-door hatchback (Europe)

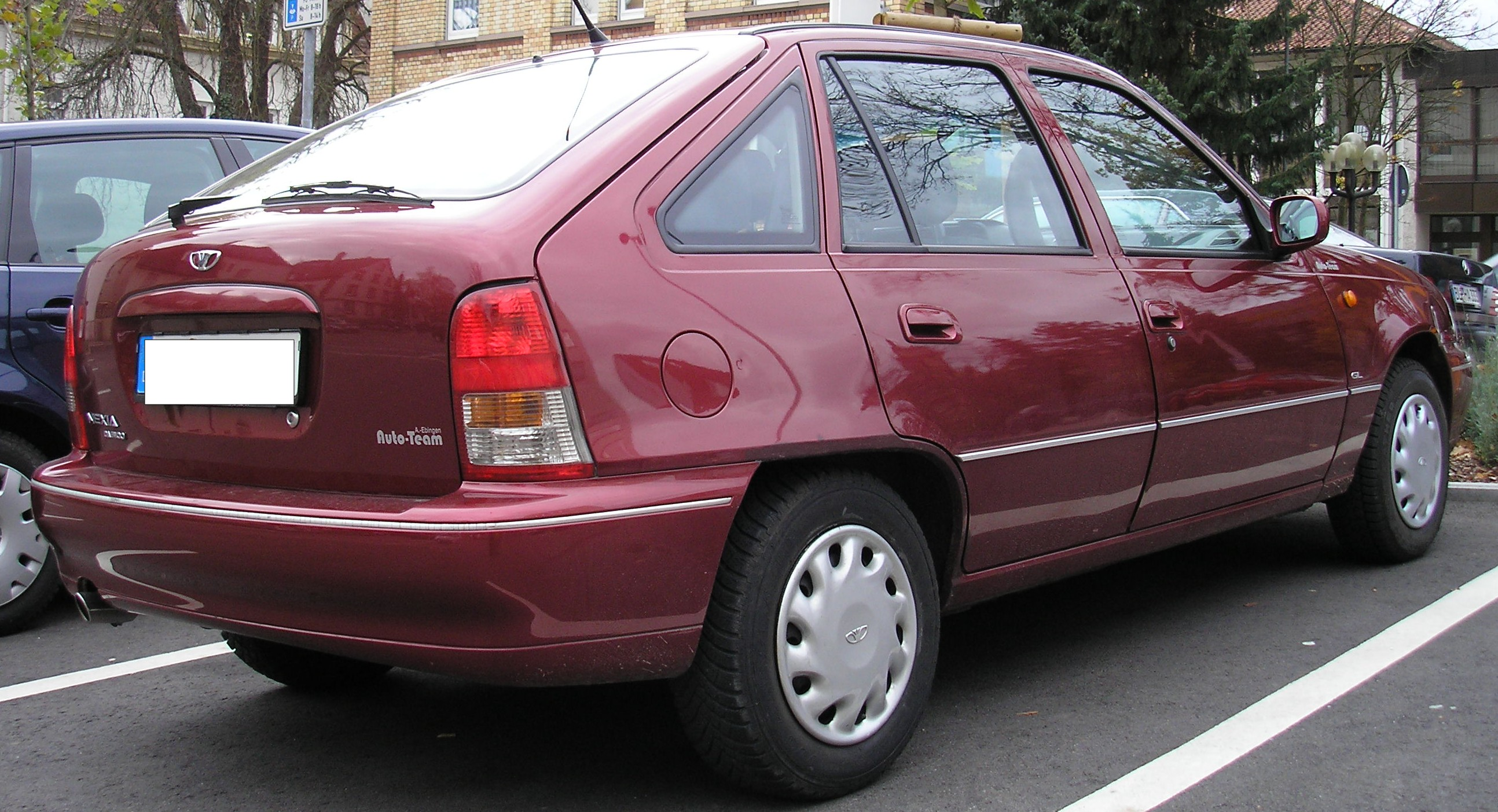
Daewoo Nexia 5-door hatchback (rear view)

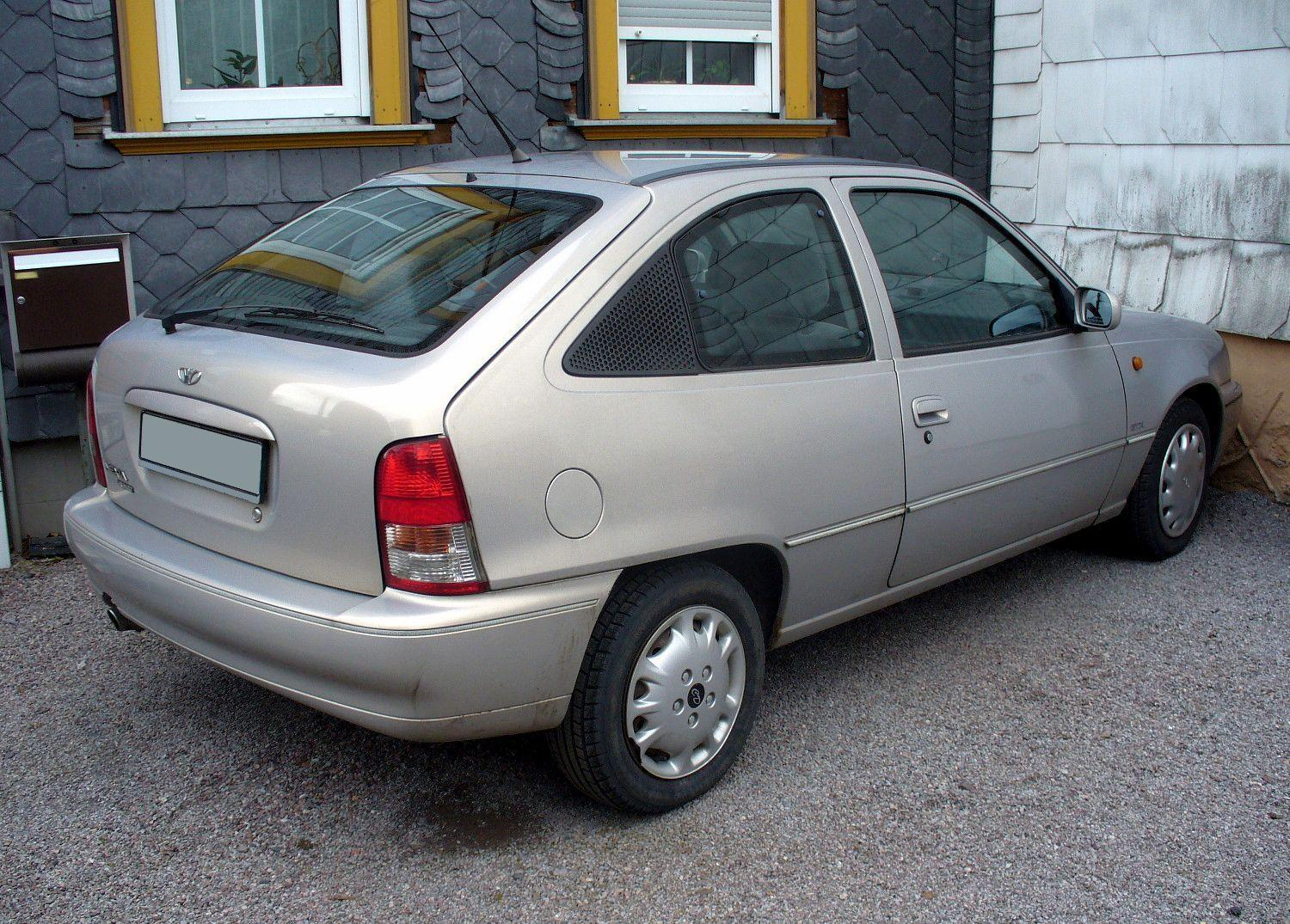
Daewoo Nexia 3-door hatchback (rear view)

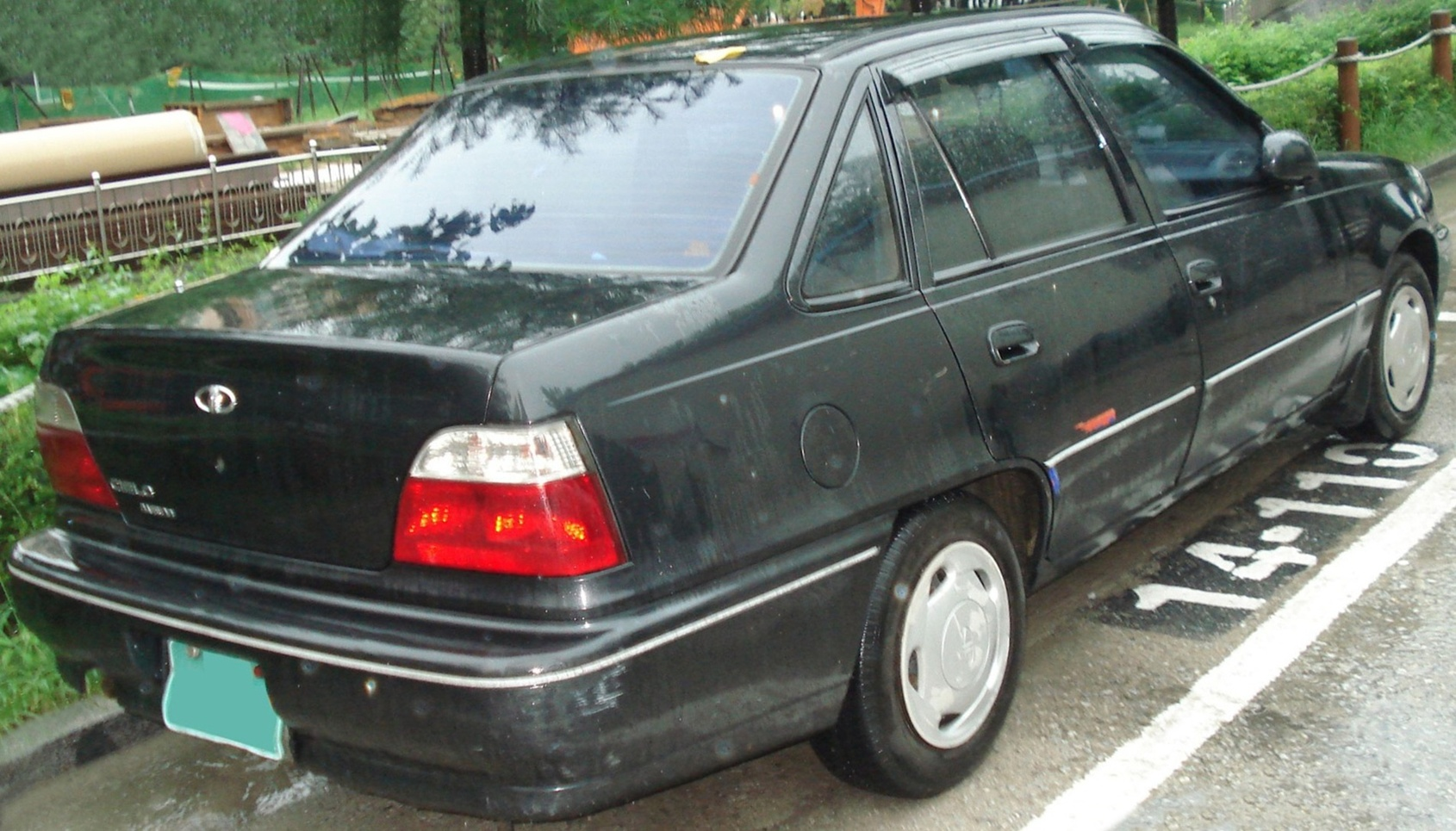
Daewoo Cielo 4-door sedan (rear view)

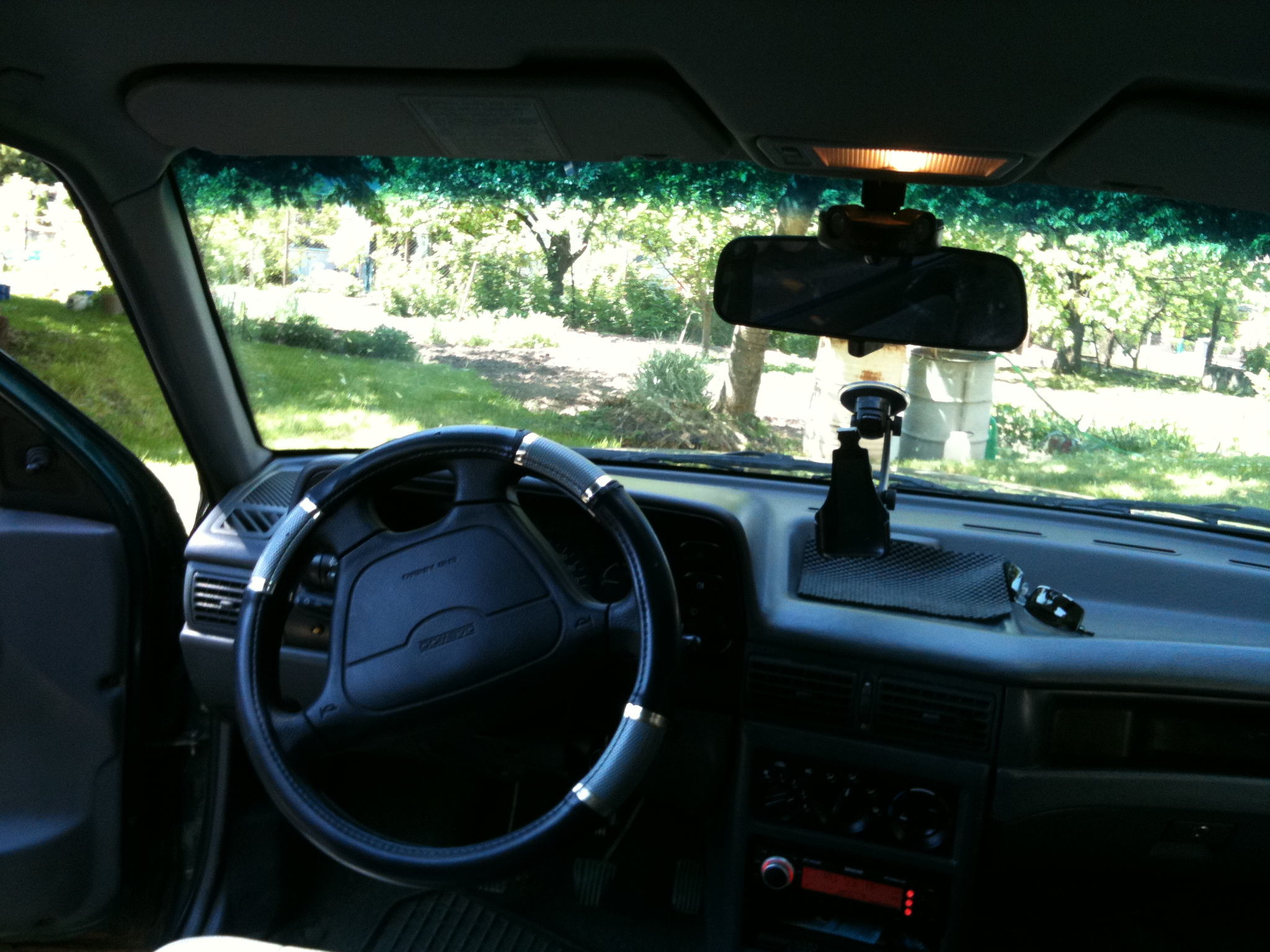
Interior

=== Prototype ===
There was a prototype of the Nexia debuted in 1995 at the Seoul Motor Show - the NGV 3 (NGV meaning Nexia Green Vehicle). From the outside it looks like a regular Nexia, except that it was powered by an electric motor.

=== Marketing and production ===
==== United Kingdom ====
Daewoo first exported cars to Europe in the mid-1990s, with the Nexia and Espero forming the two-model line-up in Britain from January 1995. Daewoo was the first manufacturer to sell cars on the British market directly to customers rather than setting up a conventional dealer network, and the appeal of its cars was further enhanced by the following promotions:

- A low and fixed asking price
- 3 year/60,000 mile comprehensive warranty
- 3 years free servicing
- 3 years free AA membership (which also meant giving a free courtesy car if in an inconvenience)
- Free delivery plates
- One-year free road tax
- A free full tank of petrol
- 30-day peace-of-mind refund or exchange period
- A free 'N' plate replacement in August 1995
- A free mobile phone.

There were two trim levels available. The base model was the GLi which was quite well-equipped at the time, including a 1.5 SOHC (8-valve) engine, 'GLi' emblems at the body wings and boot, single-bench folding rear seat, power steering, driver's airbag and ABS. Different style hubcaps and automatic transmission were an option. After, there was the GLXi which (equipment over GLi) had a 1.5 DOHC (16-valve) engine, 'GLXi' emblems at the body wings and boot, all-round electric windows and mirrors, hubcaps, central locking, rev counter and split-folding rear seats. Alloy wheels were optional only on the GLXi. The "base" model was available for large contracts, the biggest single sale being to NHS Scotland. All models got the same four-spoke steering wheel. Most models received a 'TWIN CAM 8v' badge at the rear whilst those with automatic transmission had the 'AUTOMATIC' badge. The dealer plates had the writing 'DAEWOO' in a black background with the phone number, a black line going through either side with the number plate ID under the number plate.

When AA tested the Nexia 1.5 GLi in September 1995, they liked it due to its dealer satisfaction but criticized for being dull. In conclusion they said the Nexia is an ultra-sensible family car, with a hassle-free aftersales package and being good value for money.

Despite making use of a design which was by then more than a decade old, the Nexia was one of the most popular budget family cars in Britain and helped Daewoo gain a 1% share of the new car market in 1996. Also, air-conditioning became a free option in every Daewoo, even in the Nexia GLi 3-dr. It was replaced there by the Lanos in the autumn of 1997, by which time some 40,000 examples had been sold. Despite this, the Nexia was sold until December 1997.

===== Awards =====
At July 1997, Daewoo announced that the Nexia won the best-in-class award (beating its rivals) and the favourite model category (behind the BMW 5-Series) in the 1997 Cornhill Insurance Motor Test.

===== Recalls =====
At 26 January 1996, Daewoo recalled all Nexia's since its introduction in April 1995 because of the wiring harness engine bay has been misrouted, which could have resulted in a chafing of the harness.

===== Criticisms =====
The Nexia was criticized for using outdated Mk2 Vauxhall Astra mechanicals and styling hints making it dull to look at and drive for some people, especially the saloons as they were Belmont-based. In addition, its ABS control module was expensive to replace. As faulty ABS was cause for the car to fail the UK's MOT test, this could prompt owners to get rid of their Nexias. Also, it had a lot of electrical problems, and did not fare very well in reliability. Spare parts were also difficult to find as it did not sell very well and the fact that its rivals sold better.

==== Romania ====
In Romania, manufacturing began in 1996, at the newly acquired Daewoo Automobile Romania factory in Craiova, being the first Daewoo model produced at the plant. It was offered only with the sedan body style, and was exported to most countries in Central and Eastern Europe. The GLE version, which was the full option model, included air conditioning, power steering, front and rear electric windows, fog lamps, central locking, tachometer and a cassette player stereo system. Unlike models intended for Central and Western Europe, the cars sold in Romania (either imported or produced here) were never equipped with ABS or airbags.

In 2000, the model range was extended with the new Executive level, which featured a distinctive chromed grille and borrowed elements from the GLX, such as 14-inch wheels, bigger 256 mm ventilated disk brakes and the double overhead camshaft engine with 16 valves, that offered an increased power output. The Executive also received an electronic ignition distributor from the Lanos. Another addition to the 2000 model was the catalytic converter respecting Euro 2 emission standards. In 2004, because of harsher emission regulations, the factory installed the Lanos 1.5 SOHC engine, which meant a decrease in horsepower, but made the car Euro 3 compliant. During the last 2 years of production, in an effort to update the optional equipment available for the car, the Executive received a CD player instead of the cassette player. It remained in production until 2007, being marketed along with its successor, the Daewoo Nubira.

==== Uzbekistan ====
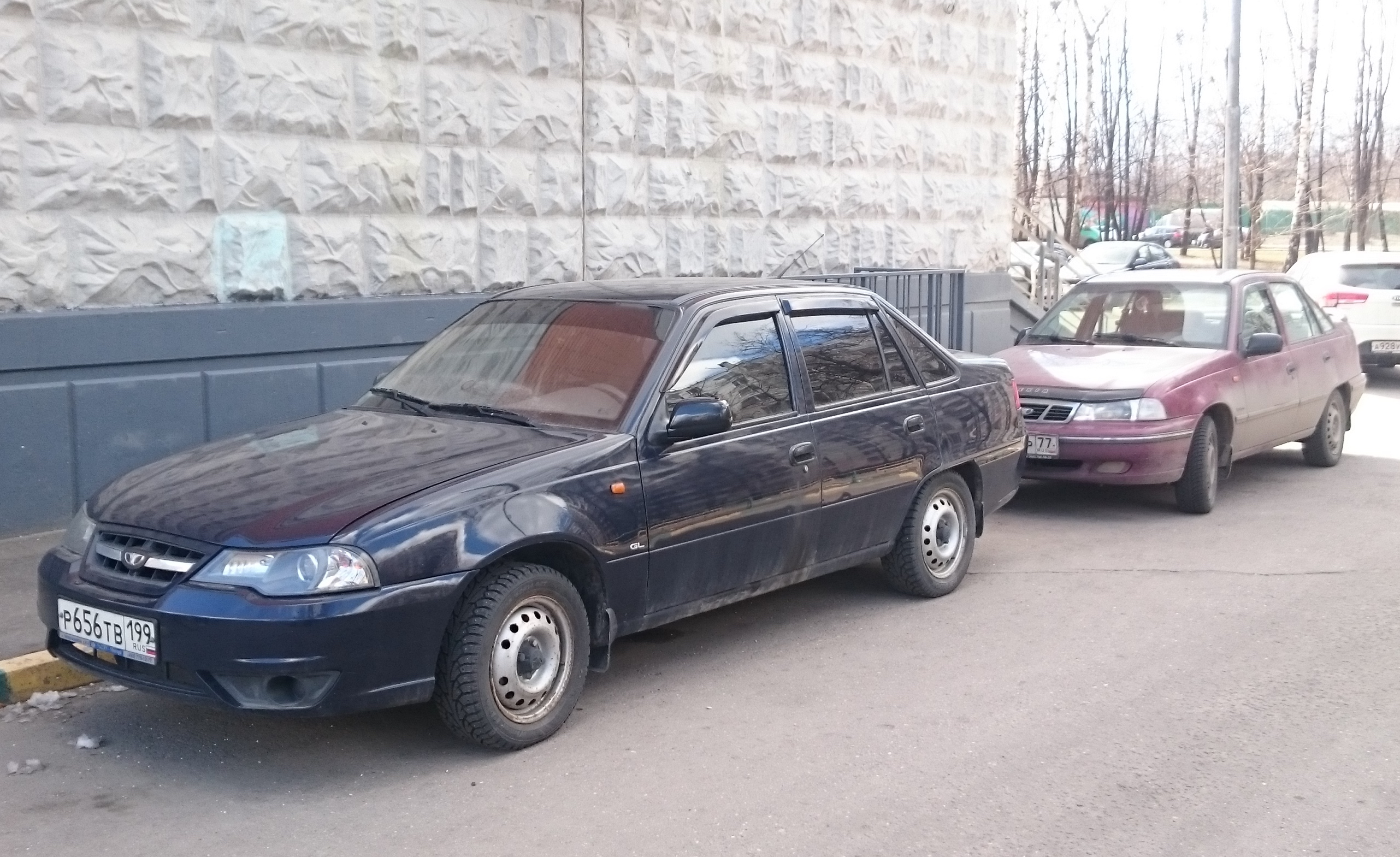
Daewoo Nexia post and pre-facelift comparison

In Uzbekistan, UzDaewooAuto continued to manufacture the four-door sedan version of the Nexia, production of which began in June 1996. It was produced alongside other Daewoo and Chevrolet models and was exported to other countries, such as Kazakhstan, Russia, Moldova, Azerbaijan and Ukraine.

At the time, the car was available with three engine options: a 1.5-litre SOHC (56 kW or 75 hp), 1.5-litre DOHC (62 kW or 83 hp) and 1.6-litre DOHC (81 kW or 109 hp). The 1.6 version has more powerful brakes and transmission with an additional long main gear.

A facelift of the car, known as the Nexia II, was presented in Tashkent, Uzbekistan, in 2008. It was designed in the United Kingdom by Concept Group International LTD with cooperation of GM Uzbekistan. In Uzbekistan, it was marketed under the Chevrolet brand, while some export markets (in the CIS area) continued to receive the car as the Daewoo Nexia. Production ended in 2016. Due to the low quality control and use of cheap alloys the car constantly failed safety tests. As result of random review conducted by an independent journalist agency in 2002, the car was tested for safety according to ARCAP standards and consequently received a score of 0.6 out of 16 putting it among the least safe cars.

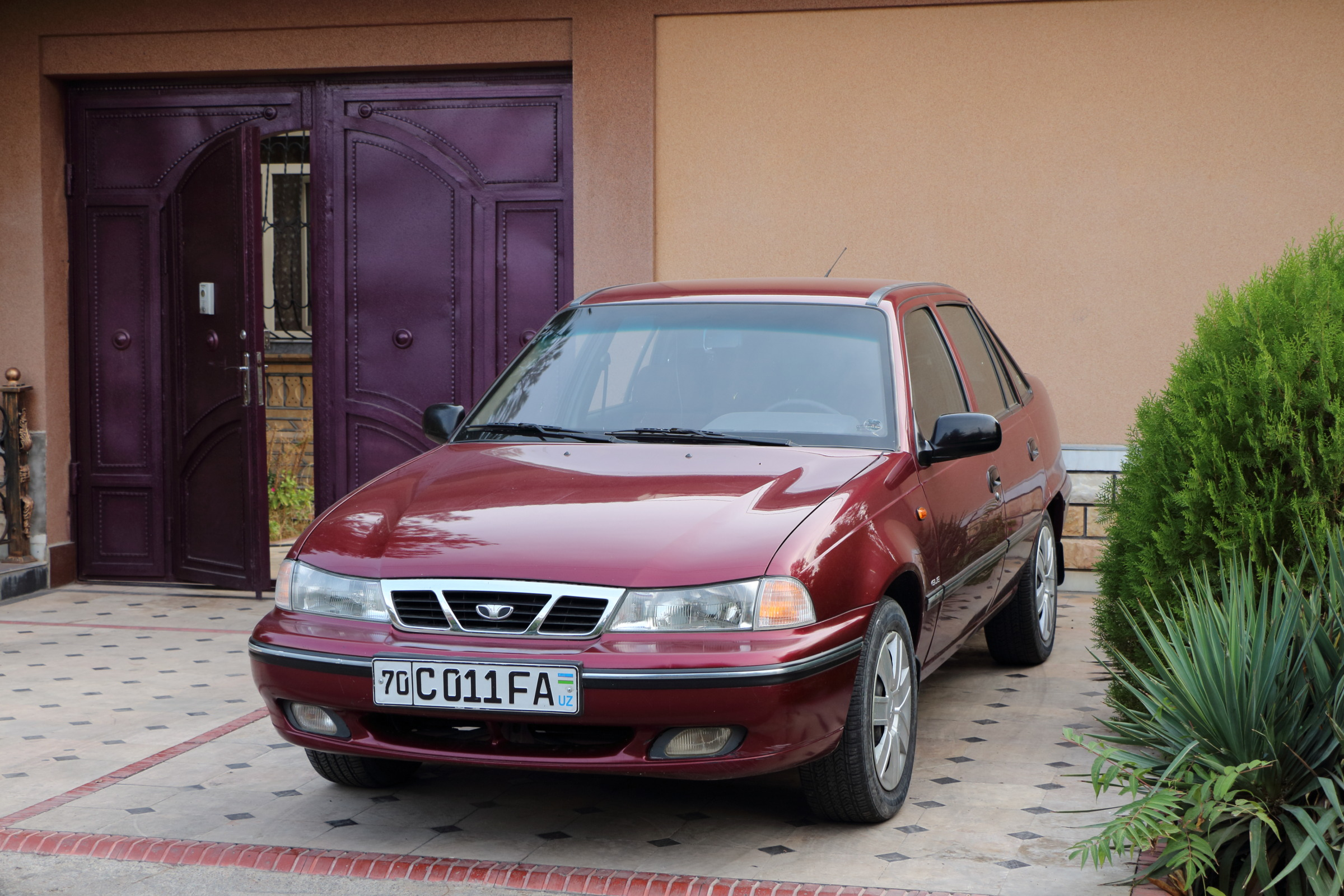
UzDaewooAuto made Daewoo Nexia (pre-facelift)

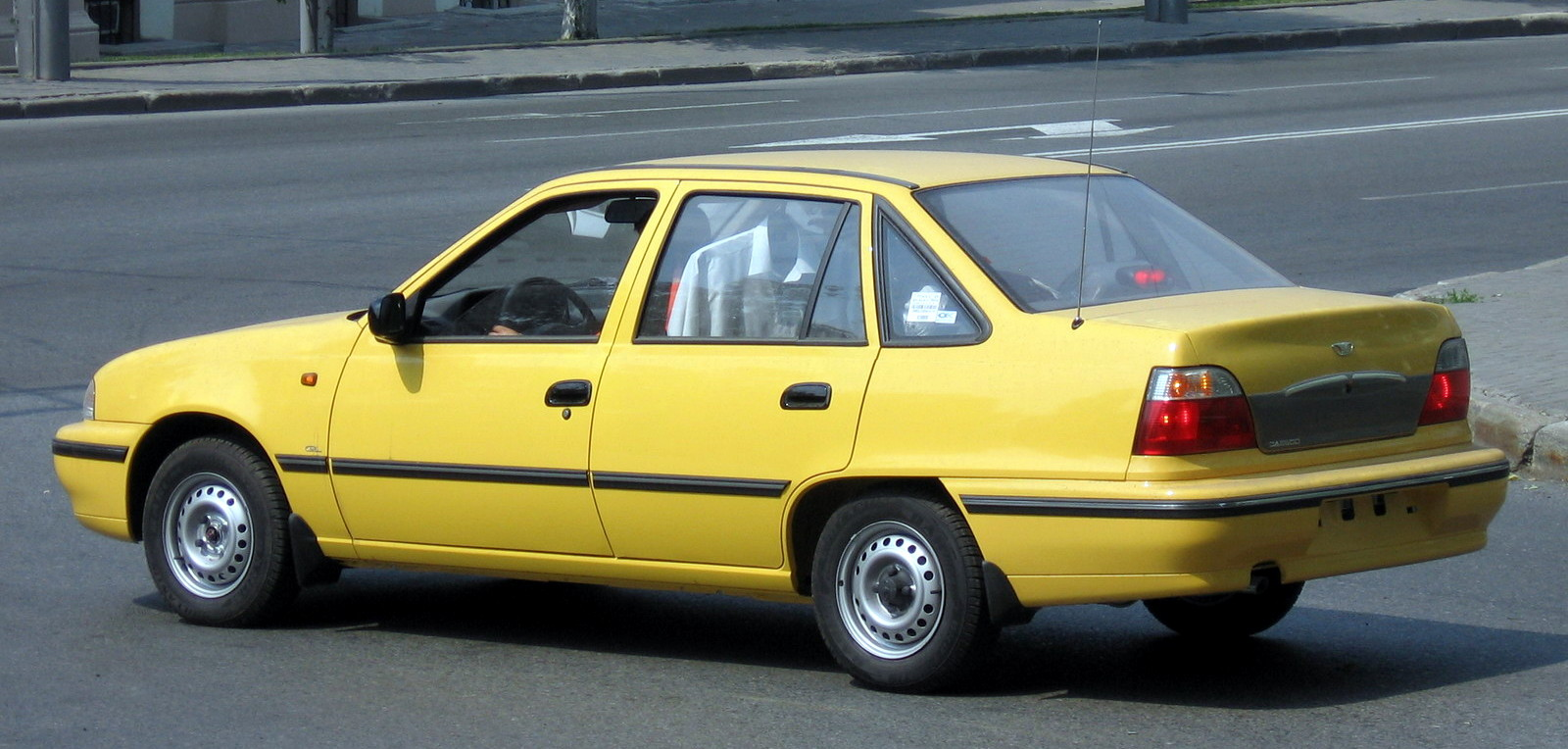
UzDaewooAuto Nexia (rear view)

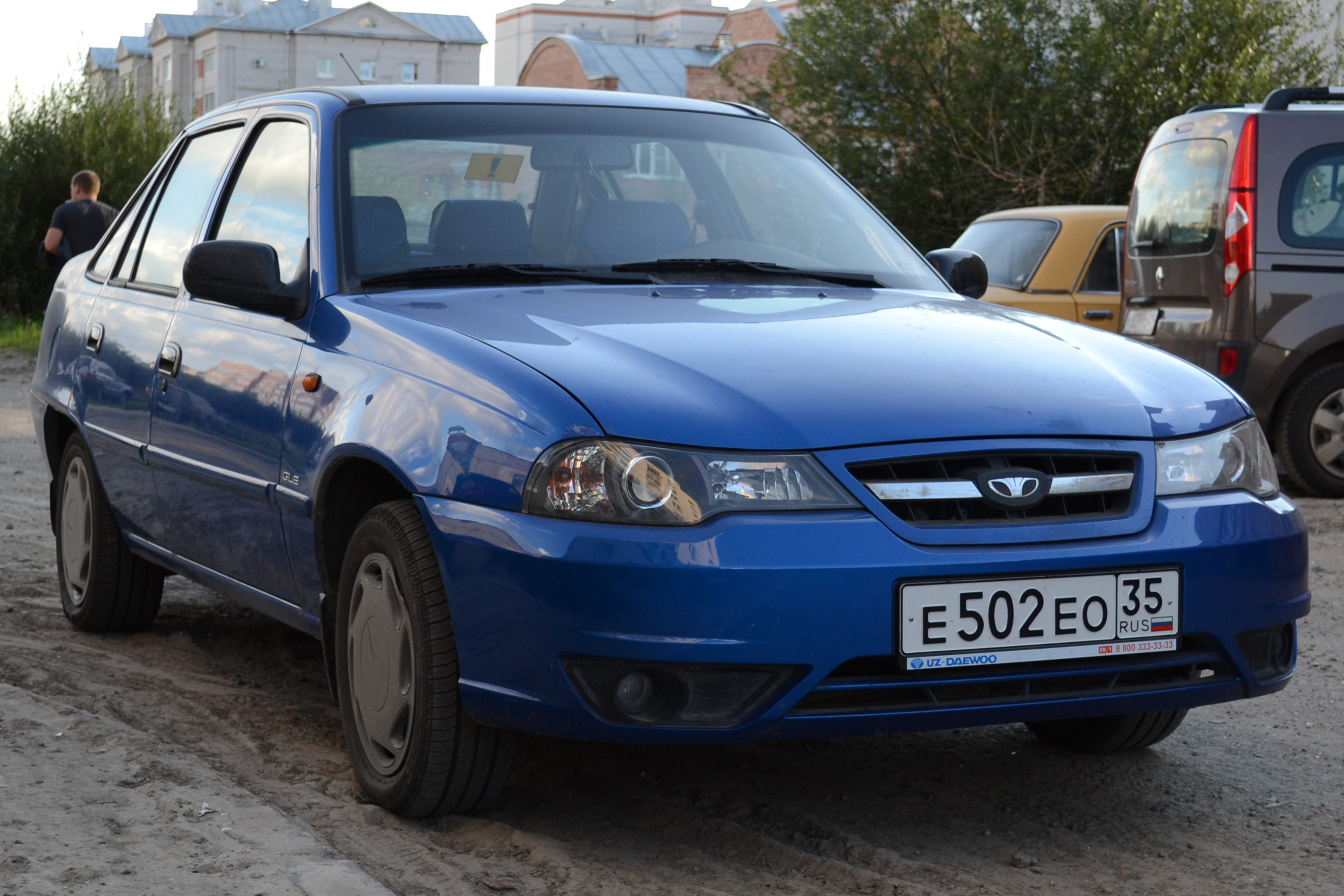
Daewoo Nexia II (facelift)

Daewoo Nexia II (rear view)

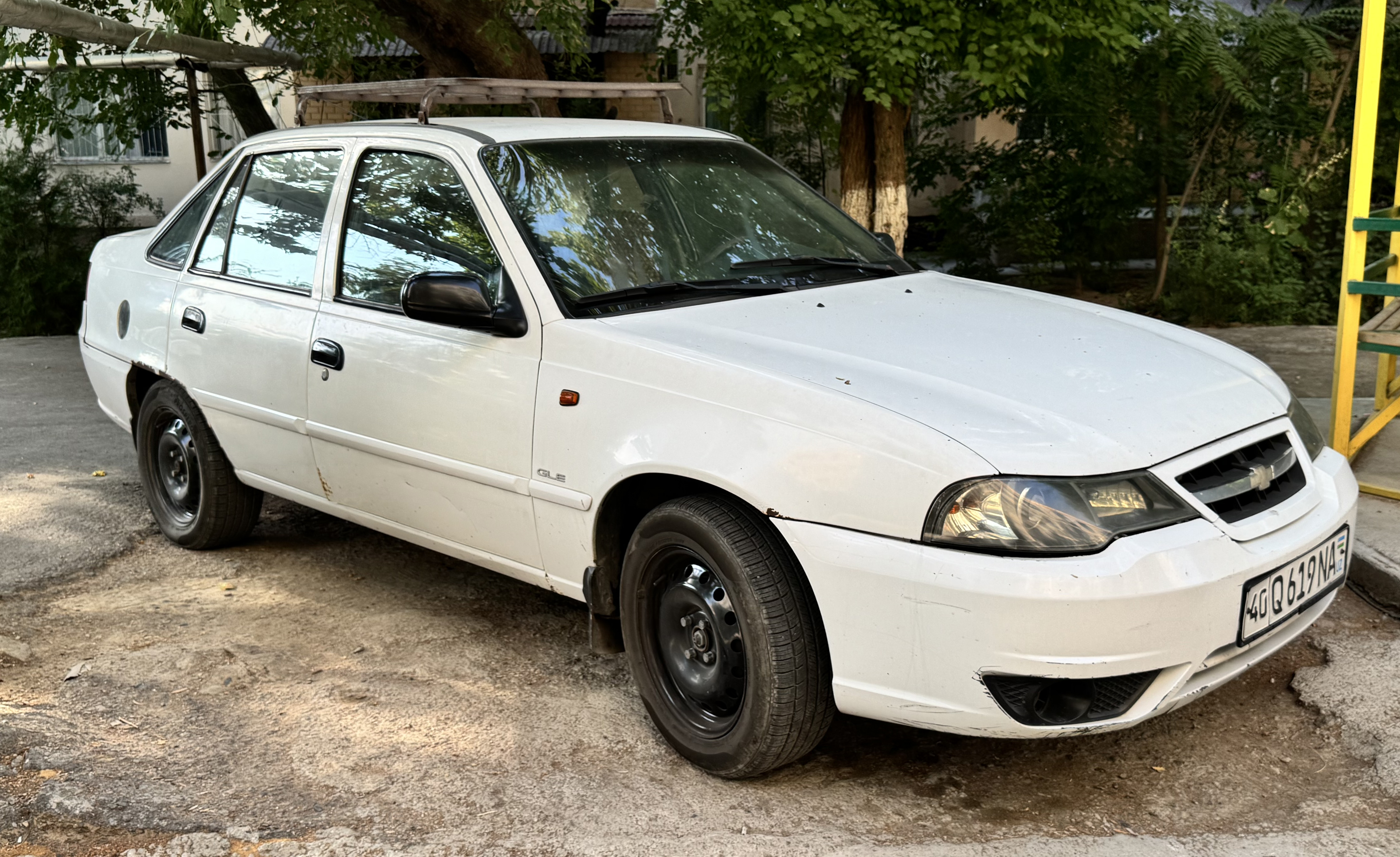
Chevrolet Nexia (Uzbekistan)

==== The Netherlands ====
Production began in 1995. Two trim levels were available, the GL and GTX. The base model GL came with hubcaps, wind-up windows and manually adjustable mirrors. The GTX was a step up which included different designed hubcaps, air-con, electric windows and mirrors and a tachometer. Special editions included the 'Sport' which included front, rear and side skirts, sporty seats and alloy wheels. All three body types were available. Production terminated in 1997.

=== Engines ===
Model	Engine Code	Years	Displacement	Weight	Power	Torque	0–100 km/h (0-62 mph)	Emissions
1.5 SOHC 8V	G15MF	1996–2000	1498 cc	1,025 kg (2,260 lb)	75 hp (56 kW; 76 PS) at 5400 rpm	127 N⋅m (94 lb⋅ft) at 3200 rpm	12,5 s	Non-Euro
1.5 DOHC 16V	A15MF	2000–2004	1498 cc	1,088 kg (2,399 lb)	84 hp (63 kW; 85 PS) at 4800 rpm	136 N⋅m (100 lb⋅ft) at 3400–4600 rpm	12,2 s	Euro 2
1.5 SOHC 8V	A15SMS	2004–2007	1498 cc	1,078 kg (2,377 lb)	80 hp (60 kW; 81 PS) at 5600 rpm	123 N⋅m (91 lb⋅ft) at 3200 rpm	12,8 s	Euro 3
