= Asüna =

Defunct automobile brand by General Motors Canada

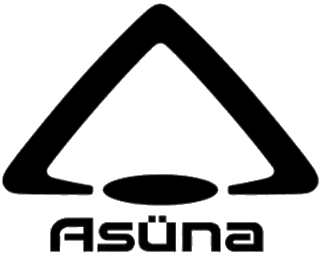
- Product type: Automobile
- Produced by: GM Canada
- Country: Canada
- Introduced: April 12, 1992
- Discontinued: July 1, 1994; 32 years ago
- Related brands: Geo
- Markets: Canada
- Previous owners: General Motors

Asüna was a captive import automobile marque created in 1992 for sale in Canada by General Motors as a counterpart to Geo. It was one of two successors to the Passport marque, which had a similar intent.

== Overview ==
Preceding the Asüna marque, Passport sold a Korean (Daewoo) made rebadged Opel Kadett E known as the Passport Optima (which hit Canadian shores in 1988) as well as a selection of Isuzu cars and SUVs. General Motors Canada changed its branding strategy in 1988, disbanding Passport (the Optima was rebadged for 1992, as Pontiac LeMans). Isuzu was grouped together with Saab and GM's new, import-fighting Saturn division to form Saturn-Saab-Isuzu dealerships. The Geo marque was introduced in Canada in (model year) 1992, offered at Chevrolet-Oldsmobile-Cadillac dealerships, which had been selling the Geo-rebadged Suzuki marque's products as Chevrolets from 1987 until the marque's introduction. Sales of Geo vehicles were relatively successful, prompting Pontiac-Buick-GMC dealers to request GM Canada to provide a lineup of similar "import" vehicles. Asüna was created to fulfill this demand.

The Pontiac LeMans model name was dropped altogether in favour of trimline designations, selling as Asüna SE in base trim hatchbacks and sedans, and as Asüna GT as a higher trim hatchback for 1993. The Asüna lineup was rounded out by the 1993 Sunfire (Isuzu Impulse and Geo Storm twin) and 92-93 "Sunrunner" taking the GMC Tracker's place in the Pontiac-Buick-GMC lineup.

Asüna sales could not match Geo's, and the Asüna marque was eliminated for 1994. The SE/GT and Sunfire were dropped from the GM Canada lineup and the Sunrunner was rebadged as a Pontiac model.

== List of vehicles ==
Name	Type	Years	Rebadged from	Image
Sunfire	Coupe	1993	(Japan) Isuzu Impulse	
Sunrunner	SUV	1992–93	(Japan) Suzuki Escudo	
SE/GT	Sedan (SE); Hatchback (SE, GT)	1993	(South Korea) Daewoo LeMans	
