= General Motors T platform (FWD) =

GM T platform
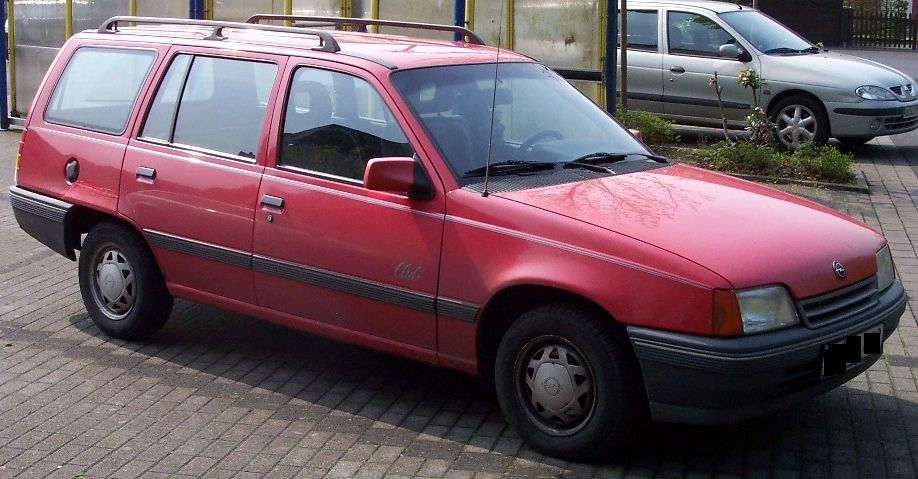
- Opel Kadett E Caravan

Overview
- Parent company: General Motors
- Also called: GM2700; GM3000; T-body
- Production: 1979–2016

Body and chassis
- Class: Compact (C)
- Layout: Transverse front-engine, front-wheel drive
- Body styles: 2-door convertible; 2-door coupé; 3-door hatchback; 3-door sedan delivery; 4-door sedan; 5-door hatchback; 5-door MPV; 5-door station wagon

Chronology
- Predecessor: GM T platform (1973); GM M platform
- Successor: GM Delta platform

General Motors reused the T-body designation (sometimes referred to as the T80 platform to differentiate it from the previous T-body), beginning in 1979 with the front-wheel drive Opel Kadett D and the Vauxhall Astra Mk I. This was part of a global strategy by GM to introduce a new front-wheel drive architecture for its sub-compact models, and would be further developed into the J-body platform which would cover the compact (lower mid-size outside North America) size segment.

This version of the T-body also became widespread throughout the world, including South Africa, where the rear-wheel drive version was not originally available.

Other names for the FWD T platform are the GM2700 and the GM3000, applied to Opel Astra G and Zafira A and their rebadges.

The platform was superseded by GM Delta platform and preceded by the GM T platform (RWD).

== List of vehicles ==
- Australia
  - Holden Astra TR
  - Holden Astra TS
  - Holden Astra AH
  - HSV VXR Turbo AH
  - Holden Zafira
- Canada
  - Asüna GT hatchback
  - Asüna SE sedan
  - Passport Optima
  - Saturn Astra
- Germany
  - Opel Kadett D
  - Opel Kadett E
  - Opel Astra F
  - Opel Astra G
  - Opel Astra H
  - Opel Zafira A
  - Opel Zafira B
- Indonesia
  - Opel Kadett D
  - Opel Optima F
- Japan
  - Subaru Traviq (rebadged Opel Zafira) A
- Latin America
  - Chevrolet Zafira A
  - Chevrolet Zafira B (Chile & Mexico)
  - Chevrolet Astra F
  - Chevrolet Astra G
  - Chevrolet Astra H (Chile & Mexico)
  - Chevrolet Vectra/Vectra GT H (Brazil & Argentina)
  - Chevrolet Kadett/Ipanema
- Russia
  - Chevrolet Viva
- South Africa
  - Opel Kadett F
  - Opel Monza (Not to be confused with the German Opel Monza)
- South Korea
  - Daewoo Cielo
  - Daewoo LeMans
  - Daewoo Nexia
  - Daewoo Racer
  - Daewoo Lanos
- Thailand
  - Opel Astra F
  - Chevrolet Zafira A
- United Kingdom
  - Vauxhall Astra Mk1, Mk2, Mk3, Mk4, and Mk5
  - Vauxhall Belmont
  - Vauxhall Zafira Mk1
  - Vauxhall Zafira Mk2
- United States
  - Pontiac LeMans (also sold in New Zealand)
  - Saturn Astra
- Uzbekistan
  - UzDaewoo Nexia
- Ukraine
  - ZAZ Lanos
  - ZAZ Sens
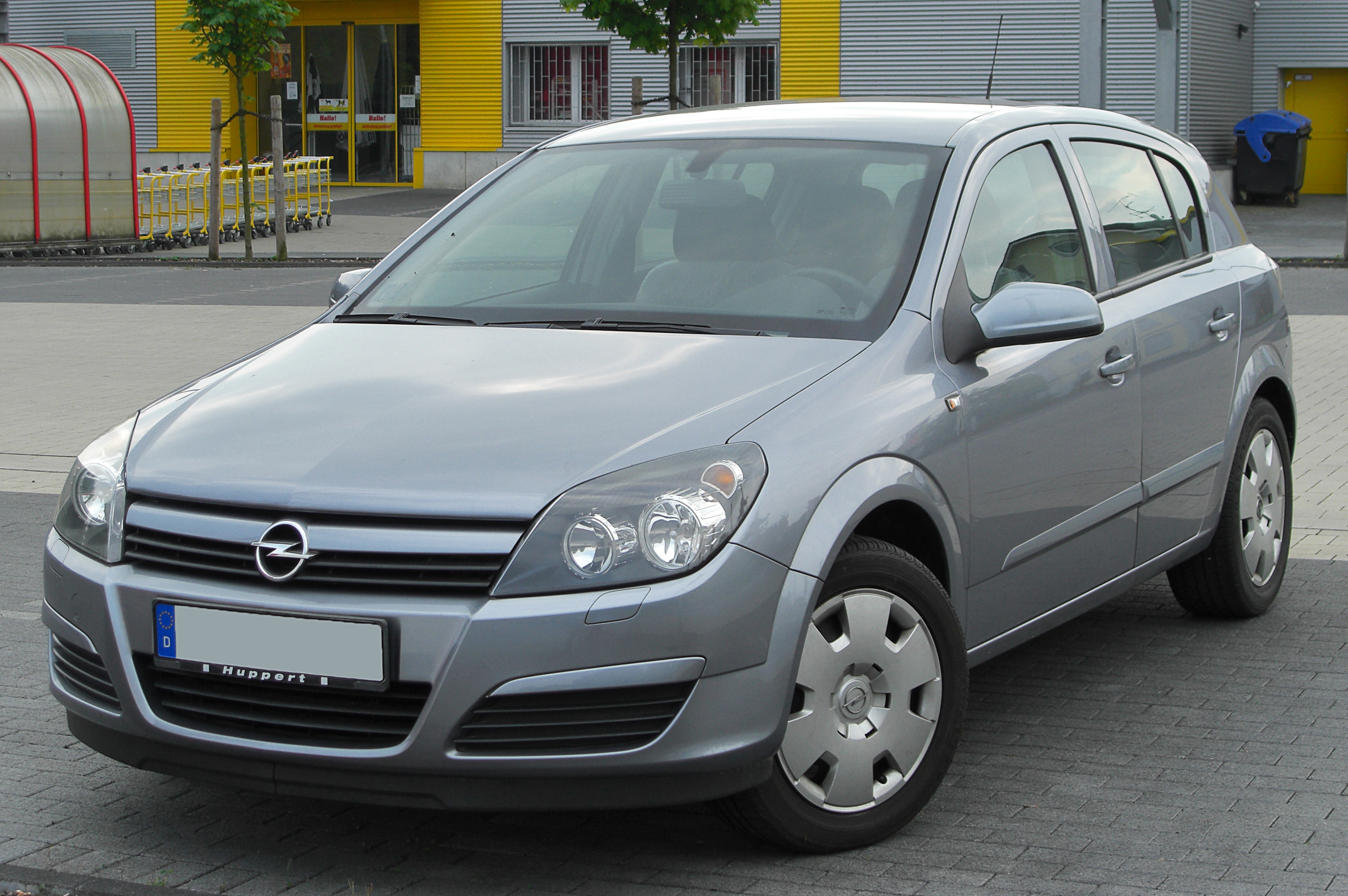
Opel Astra H

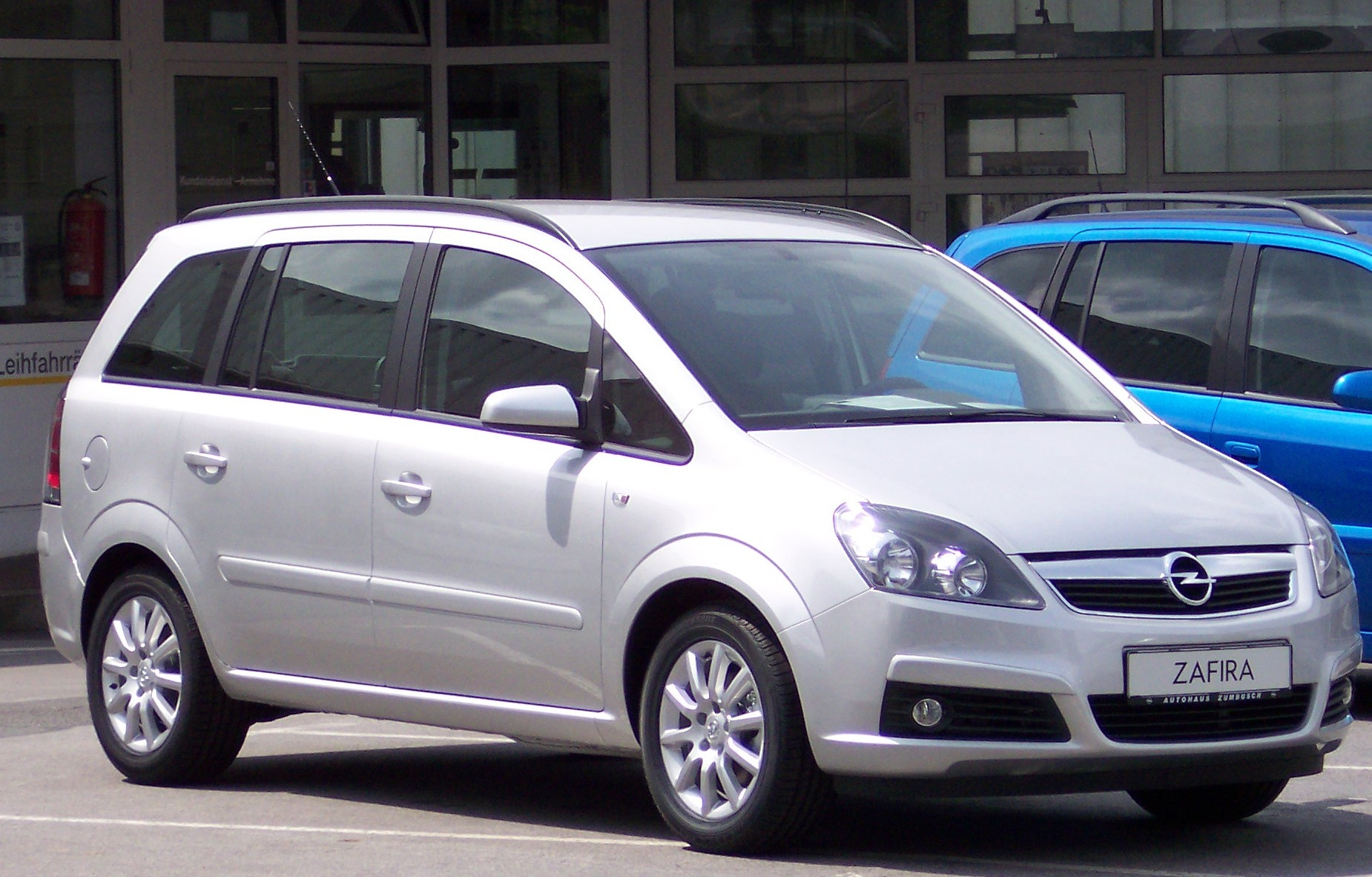
Opel Zafira B

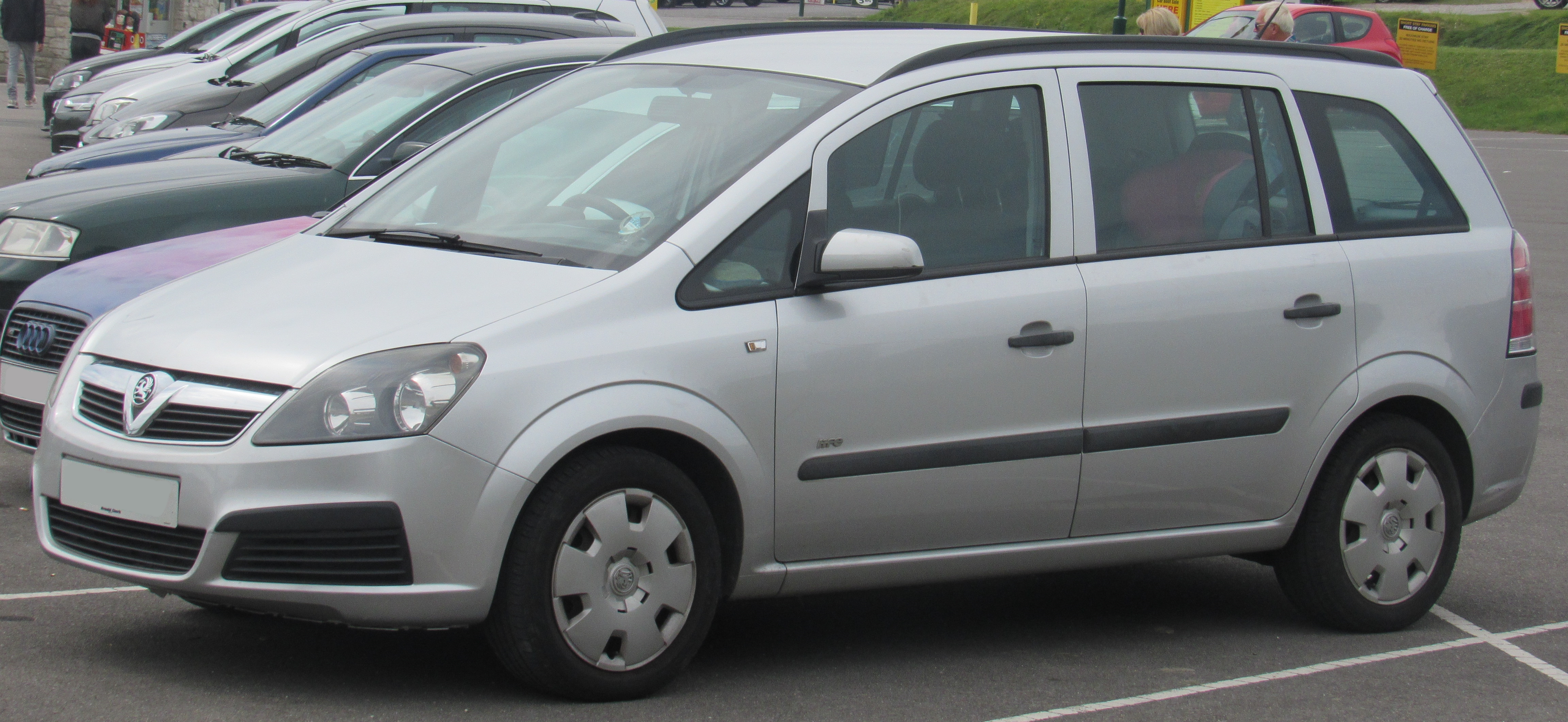
Vauxhall Zafira B

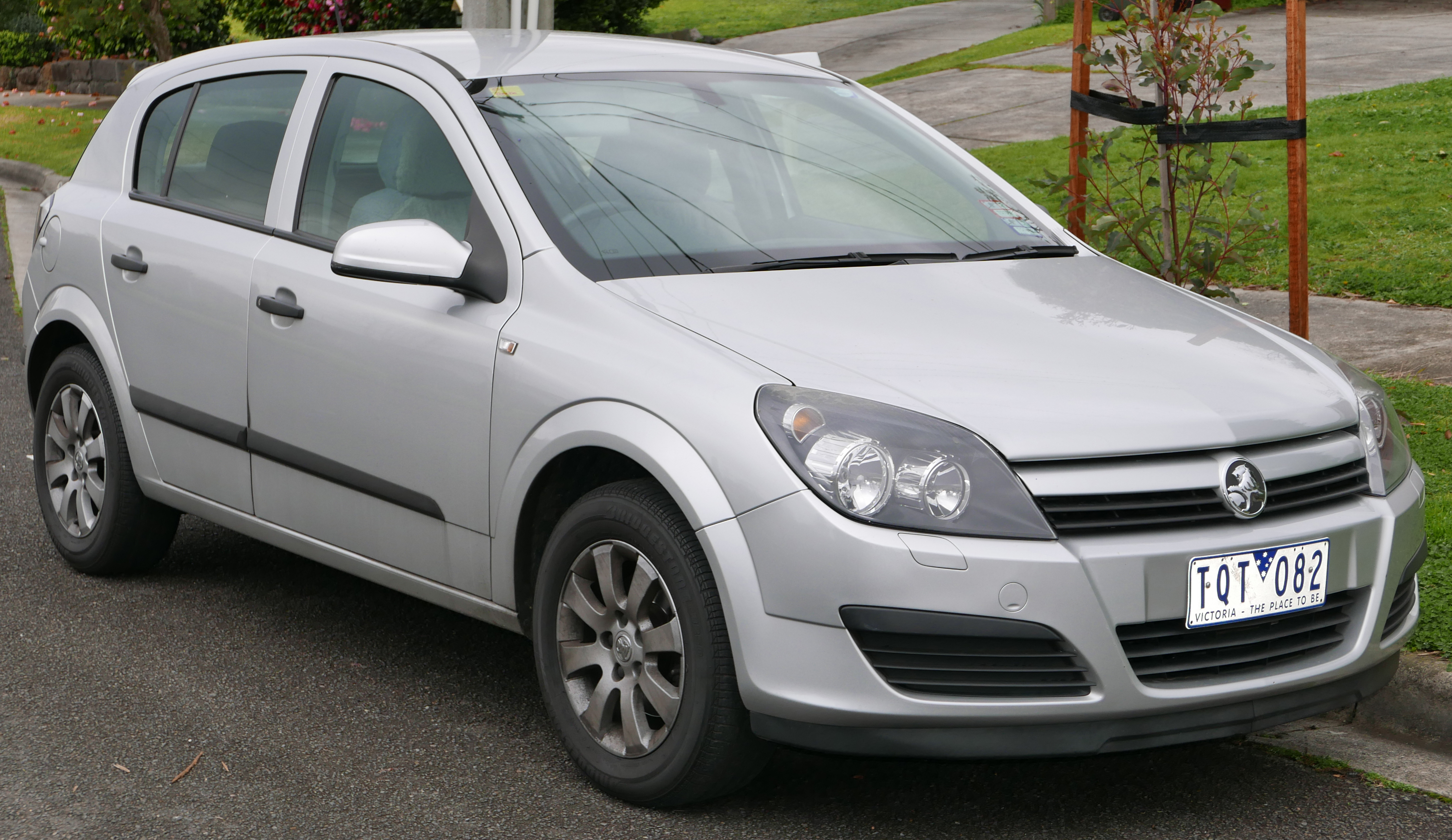
Holden Astra

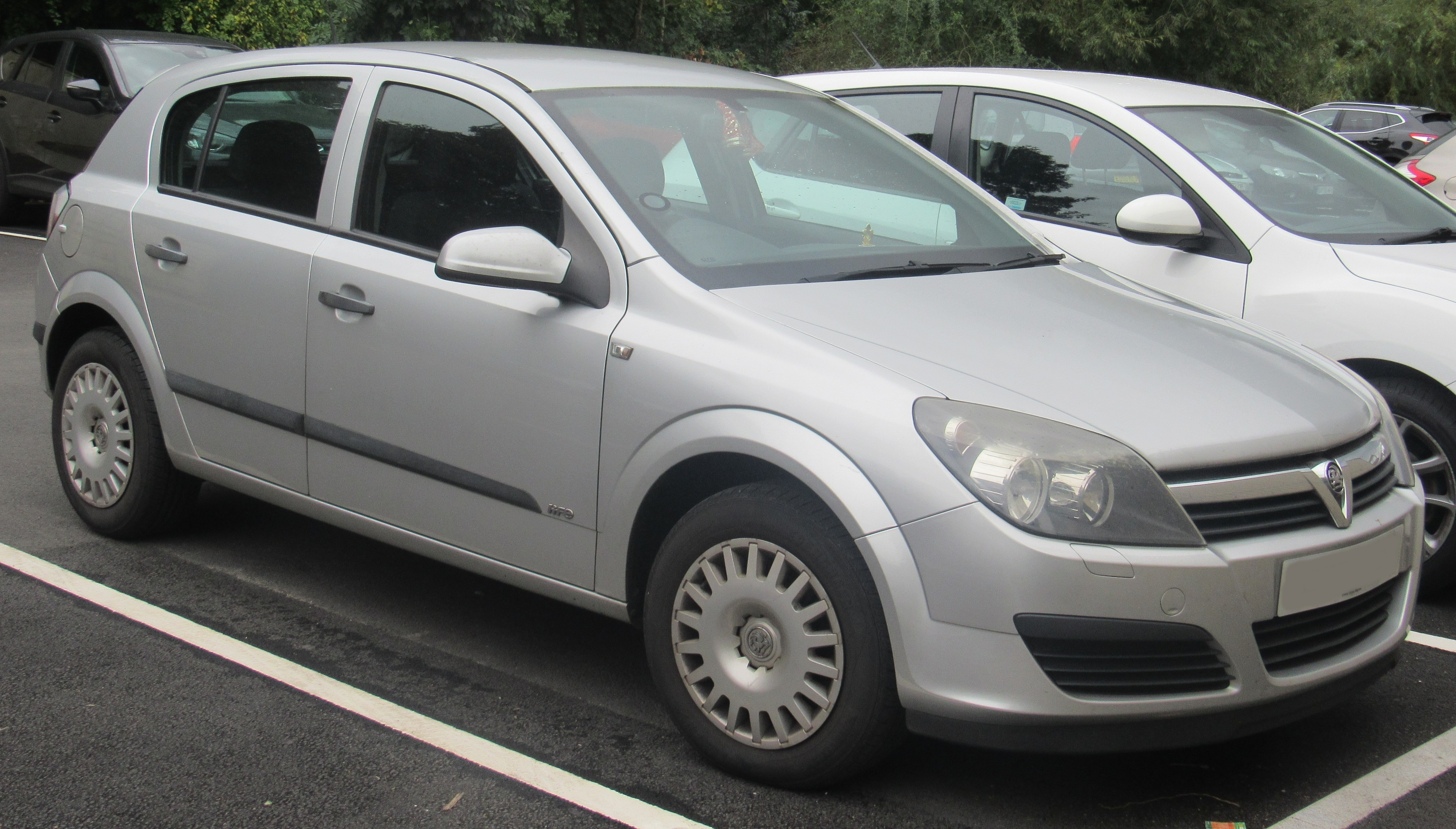
Vauxhall Astra Mk5

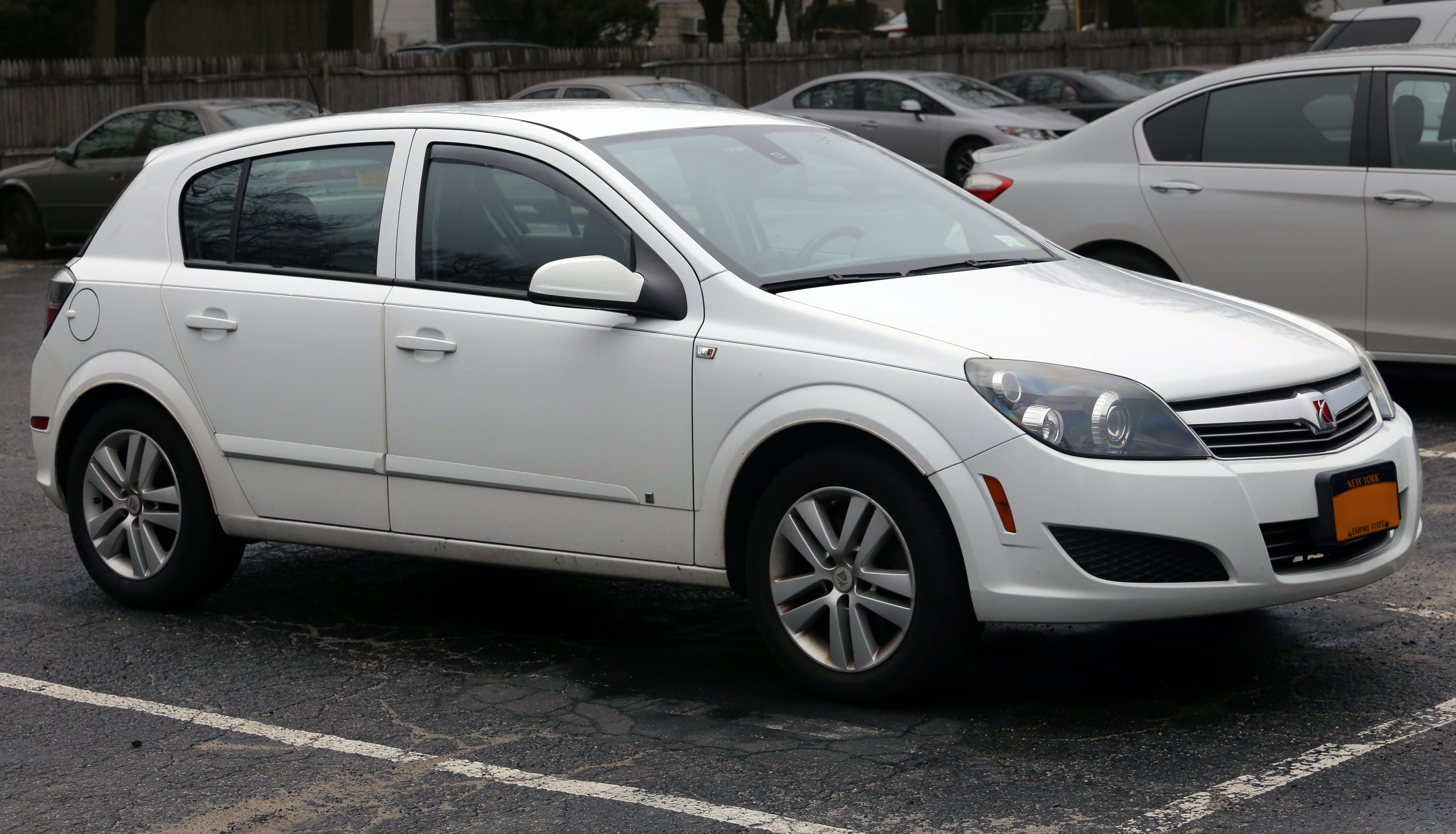
Saturn Astra

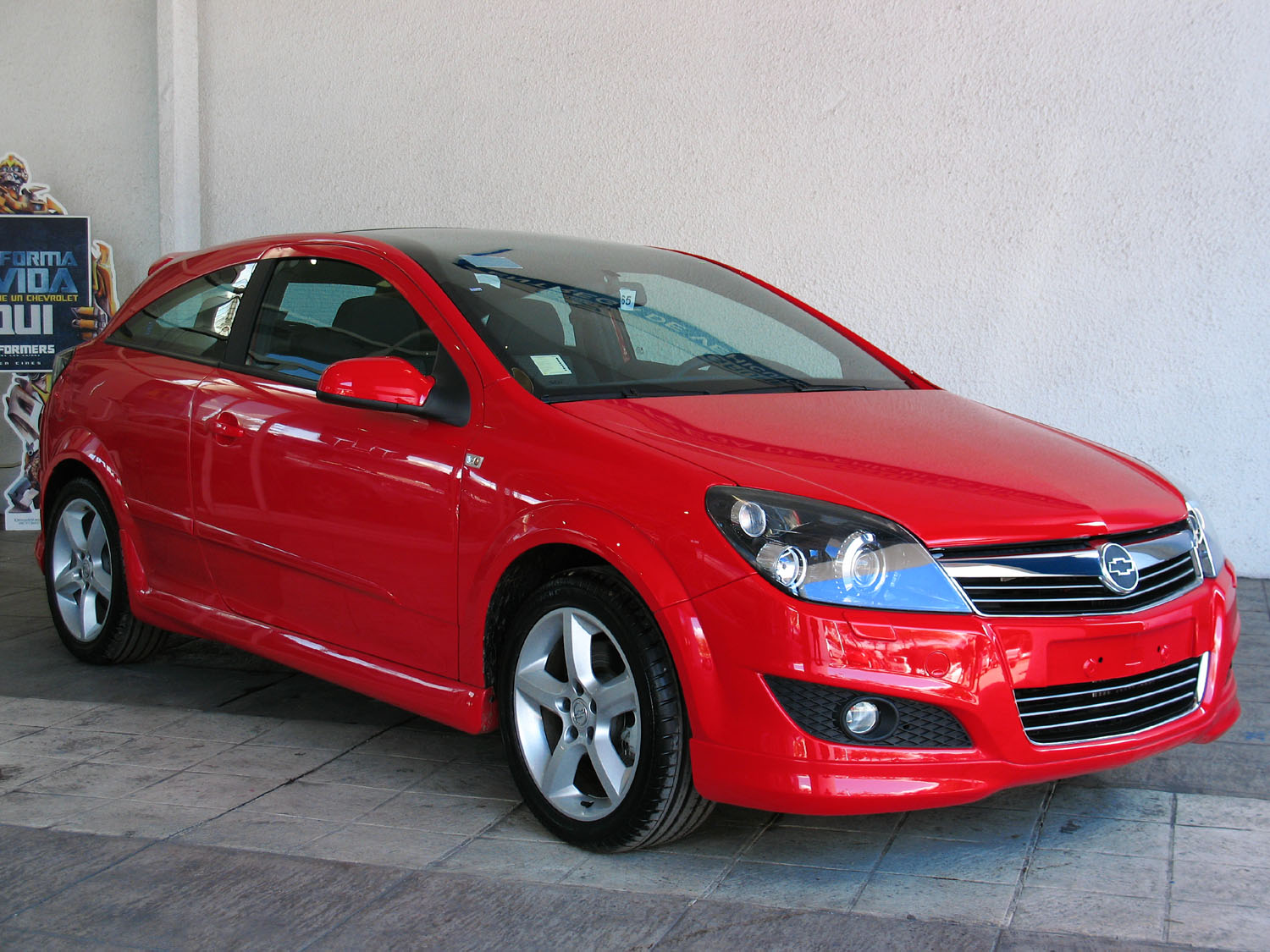
Chevrolet Astra GTC

== See also ==
- List of General Motors platforms
- General Motors T platform
