= Aksay =

Aksay may refer to:

- Aksay, West Kazakhstan Province, a town in Kazakhstan
- Aksay, Issyk Kul, a village in Kyrgyzstan
- Aksay, Rostov Oblast, a town in Russia

== See also ==
- Aksai (disambiguation)
- Aksay, Russia, a list of places in Russia
