= Daewoo Espero =

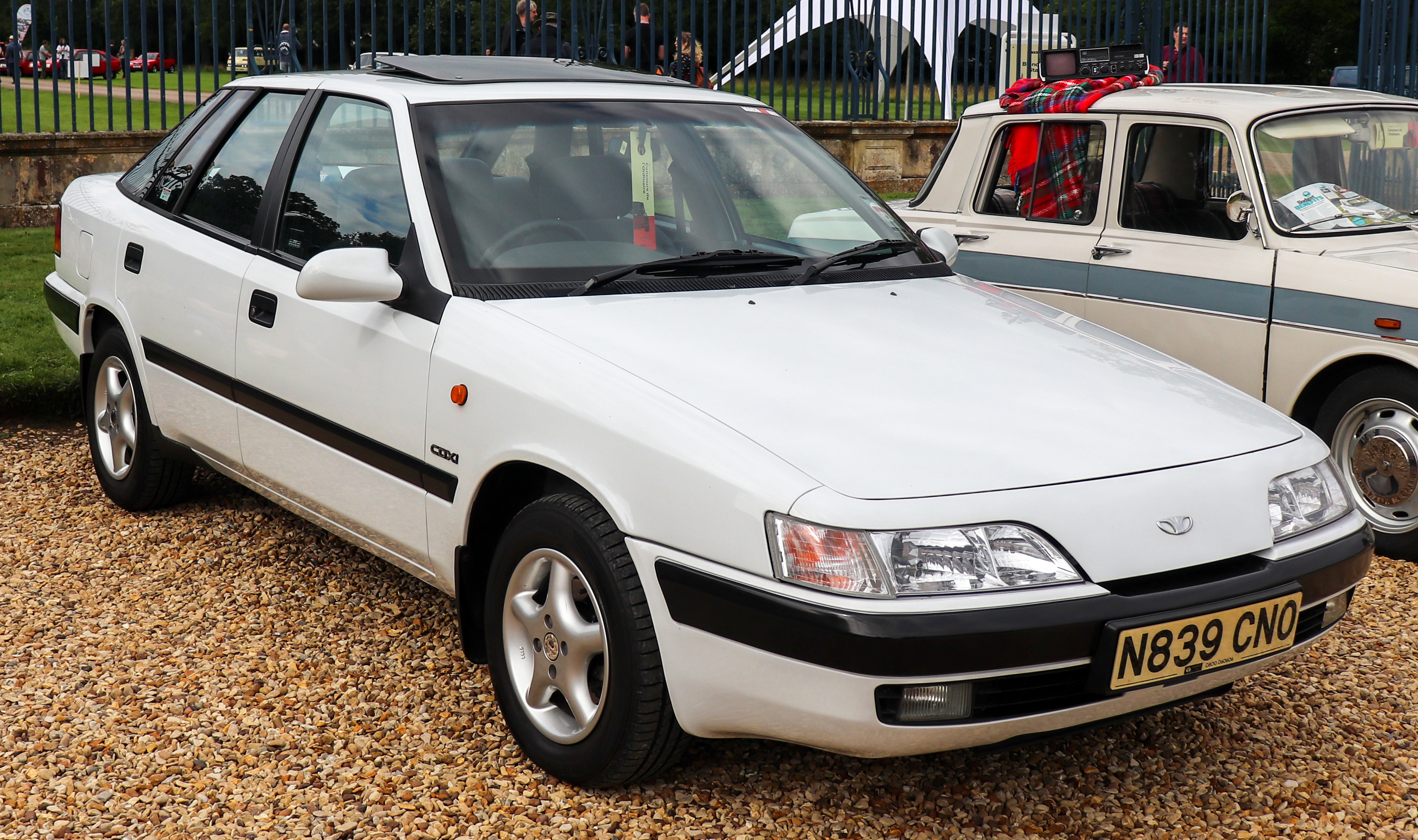

Overview
- Manufacturer: Daewoo
- Also called: Daewoo Aranos (Spain)
- Production: August 1990 – February 1997 (South Korea); September 1990 – May 1999 (Export Markets); 1996–2002 (Romania)
- Assembly: South Korea: Bupyeong; Poland: Warsaw (FSO); Romania: Craiova (Rodae); Russia: Aksay (Doninvest)
- Designer: Bertone under Marc Deschamps

Body and chassis
- Class: Mid-size car (D)
- Body style: 4-door saloon
- Layout: FF layout
- Platform: GM T

Powertrain
- Engine: petrol: 1.5 L A15MF I4; 1.5 L G15MF I4; 1.8 L C18LE I4; 2.0 L C20LE I4; LPG: 1.6 L G16LF I4 (taxi models)
- Transmission: 4-speed Aisin 50-42LE automatic 5-speed manual

Dimensions
- Wheelbase: 2,620 mm (103.1 in)
- Length: 4,615 mm (181.7 in)
- Width: 1,718 mm (67.6 in)
- Height: 1,388 mm (54.6 in)
- Curb weight: 1,108 kg (2,443 lb)

Chronology
- Successor: Daewoo Leganza (for Espero 2.0); Daewoo Nubira (South Korea)

The Daewoo Espero (also known as Daewoo Aranos in Spain) is a four-door, five-seater mid-sized saloon produced by the South Korean company Daewoo Motors from September 1990 to 1997. The Espero was the first car entirely developed by Daewoo, which until then had only manufactured models developed by Opel. With the body designed by Bertone, the model is based on the platform of the Daewoo LeMans, a badge engineered version of the Opel Kadett E manufactured in South Korea. The engines were supplied by Holden, with options ranging from the GM Family 1 1.5L to the GM Family II 2.0L. The Espero was replaced by the Daewoo Nubira in 1997, but continued to be produced until 2002 in Eastern Europe.

== Development ==
In the mid-1980s, Daewoo Motors was looking to enter in the mid-sized saloon market, which already had competitors like the Hyundai Sonata. To that end, it began developing a new model in 1986, codenamed "J-Car" (not to be confused with General Motors' J-Car, the multinational company's worldwide car project from the 1980s). It then acquired from Bertone a body design previously discarded by Citroën, which had been intended for the future successor of the Citroën BX. With access to General Motors technologies limited by contractual terms, Daewoo made extensive use of parts already being used on the Daewoo LeMans production. The steering, suspension, brakes and powertrain systems were the same as those used on the LeMans. The platform was also derived from the LeMans, but elongated between the B-pillar and the rear seat, giving the Espero a longer wheelbase than the LeMans (and longer than the J-car as well).

The Espero debuted on the Korean market in August 1990. It achieved very good results in the wind tunnel, at 0.29 Cd.

== Prototype ==
There was also a prototype that looked very similar to the Espero. This prototype is called DEV 2 (DEV meaning Daewoo Electric Vehicle) and was presented in 1995 at the Korea Motor Show in Seoul together with the Daewoo Bucrane concept, Tico concept, Nexia, Arcadia and the NGV3 concept. It was basically a version of the Espero but made out of recyclable materials which did not impact the environment. The DEV 2 had a redesigned front. This prototype was shown only in South Korea and only once at these fairs. It was painted white pearl and had 'DEV' badges in blue at the rear doors, its interior was white and the rims where a three spoke design and white as well.

Under the hood it was powered by an electric motor which was a water-cooled AC induction motor (86 kW) with performance figures with 0–100 km (0-60 mph) acceleration of 13 seconds. Top speed was around 85 mph. 22 new lead acid batteries were laid on the floor of the body, and one charge distance of 80 km (49.7 miles) was carried out.

It was said that the perfection was high but the performance and the range as an electric car was low.

== Other Dimensions ==
Espero Dimensions
Trunk Capacity	560 litres
Fuel Tank Capacity	50 litres
Climbing Angle	29.5°

== Asian ==
=== South Korea ===
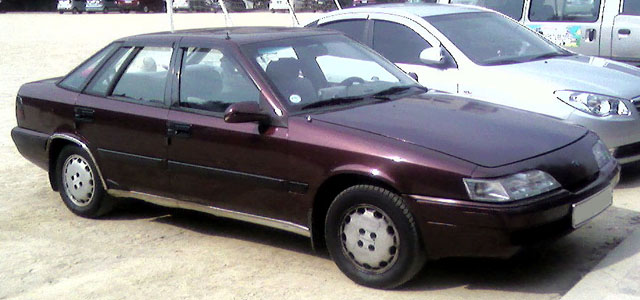

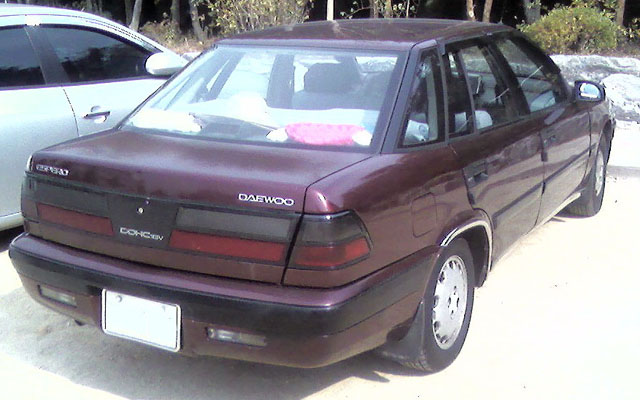
1991 Daewoo Espero (South Korea)

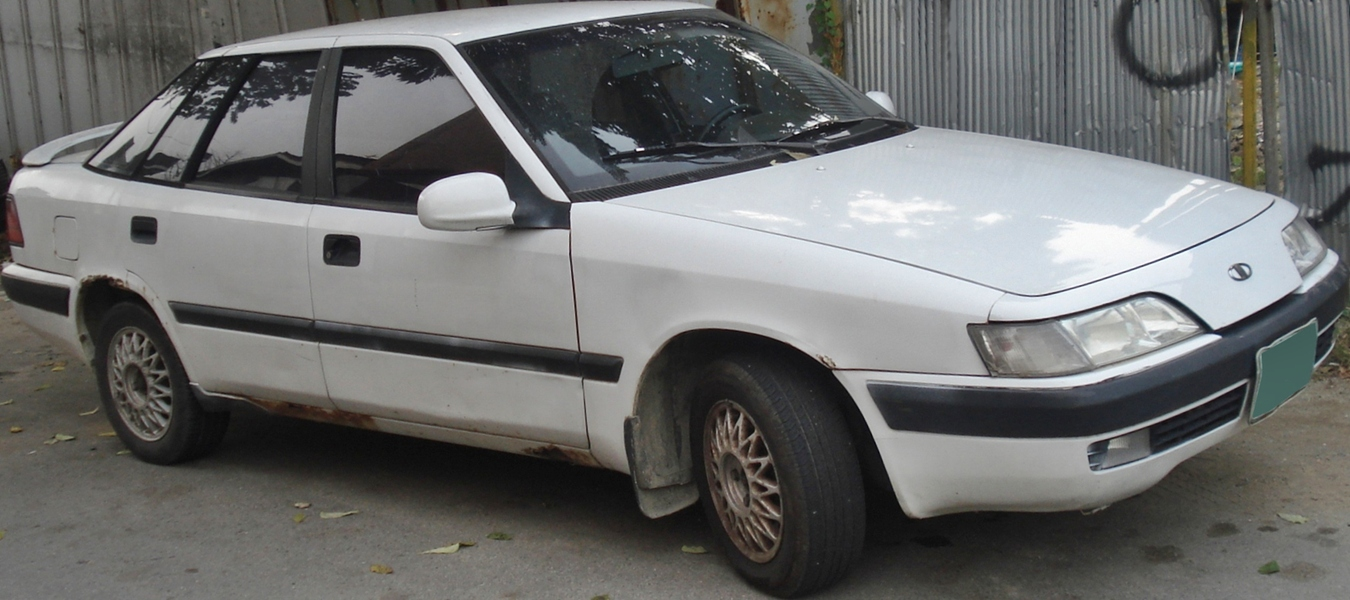

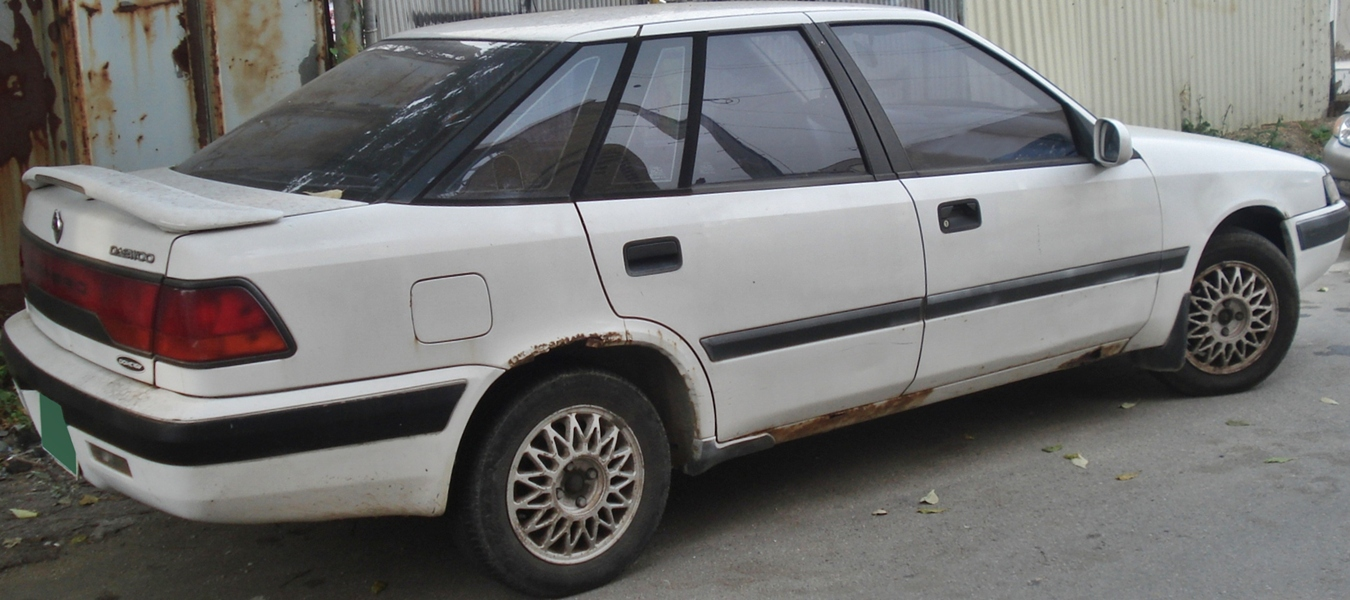
Daewoo Espero (Facelift, South Korea)

In Korea, the Espero made its debut in August 1990. The styling was very different from the European Espero's, including no badge at the front but at the rear and on the steering wheel; the badge was black and had white three waves and white writing 'ESPERO' underneath it. The first version had different rear lights which the brake and indicator lights extended to the boot lid (though there were no illuminating lights at the boot lid) and differently styled hubcaps.

In the pre-facelift, the range consisted of two models, named '1.5 DOHC' (being the base model) which had standard hubcaps and then the '2.0 SOHC' which had different styled hubcaps. The '2.0 SOHC' also had a version with package, being the top of the range model.

In the cabin of the Korean Espero, a different steering wheel and an electronic dash was available with orange letters and accents. The steering wheel was slightly different from the three-spoke wheels in Europe, and more like the steering wheel from an Opel Vectra A/Vauxhall Cavalier MK3 except that the badge was different (again, the black emblem). No airbag was available. The front door cards were different: rather than the wrap-around design in European models, the vents were more square like and the grab handle was more ergonomic rather than just a pocket design. The centre console was flat and more angular.

In late 1991, a facelift of the Espero was made. This included redesigned hubcaps (base model), a black badge saying 'ESPERO' at the rear, the rear lights were redesigned and now the black badge was put at the front. The boot opening was redesigned with a swivel badge over the keyhole to open the boot. This also meant the trim levels were revised, the base model being the 1.5 MPFi and the 2.0 MPFi (or with the package).

In 1994, a second facelift was made with the front logo changed from the black badge to a separated oval, with the same on the steering wheel). A new model was introduced, the 1.8 MPFi (which had alloy wheels and a 1.8 engine).

Production ended in 1997.

==== Advertising ====
In 1993, (2 adverts) they compared spacecraft technology and used racing drivers to demonstrate how powerful the Espero was.

In 1994, (second facelift) it was advertised that the Espero was available as the following models: 1.5 DOHC, 1.5 MPFi and the 2.0 SOHC.

=== Thailand ===
In Thailand, the Espero made its debut in 1994, imported from South Korea.

== Europe ==
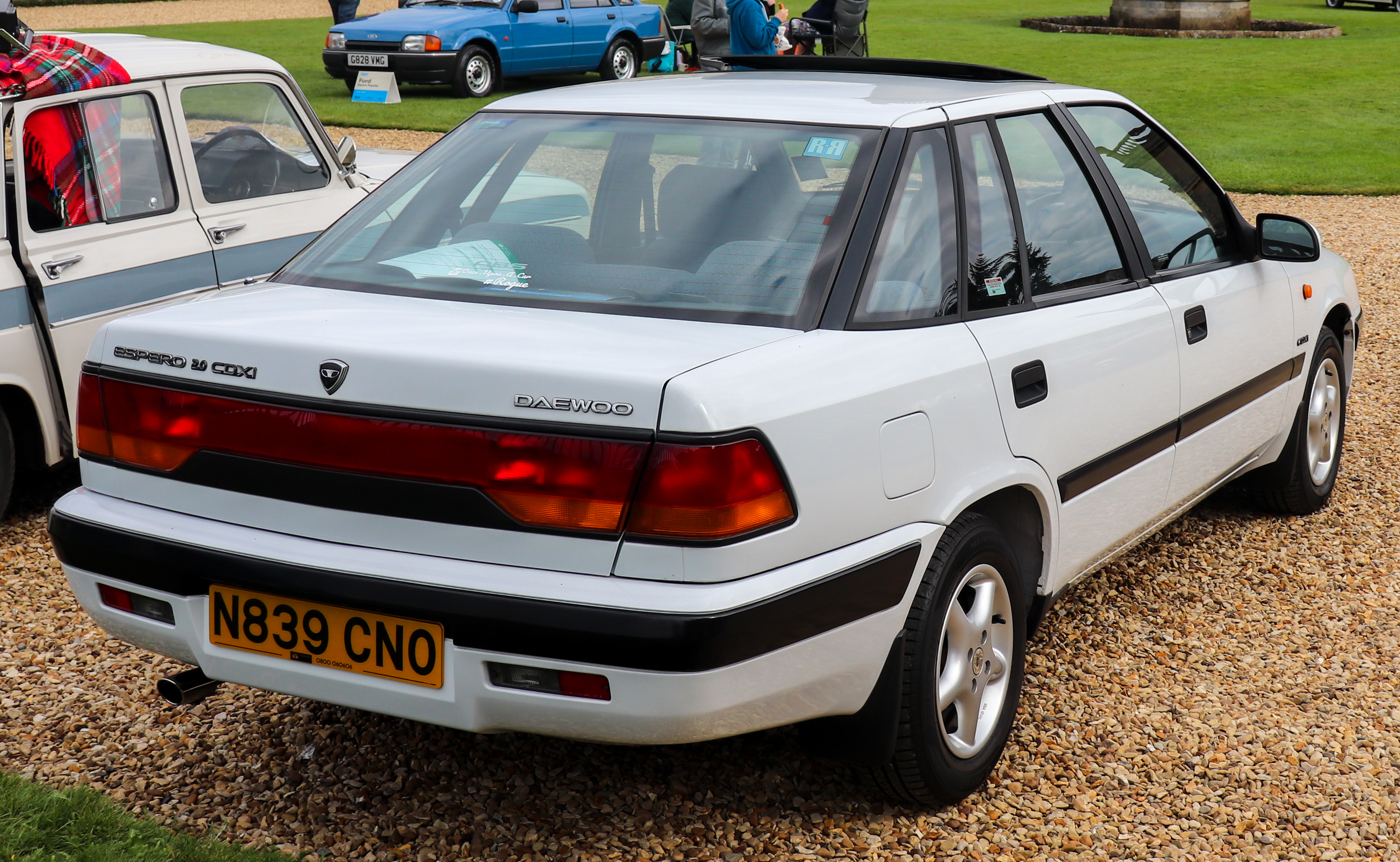
1995 Daewoo Espero rear view (Europe)

European imports began in January 1995 when it was one of two cars (the other being the Nexia) in the first European Daewoo range.

It sold well, as a result of to its competitive asking price, notchback roofline with a steeply raked rear window, spacious interior, luggage compartment, equipment levels and the comprehensive aftersales package.

Despite the fact the Espero also featured a couple of drawbacks, such as outdated interior design, mediocre fuel economy and a body which was fairly prone to corrosion, it still maintained popularity among price-conscious drivers.

The Espero was launched just months before the Vauxhall Cavalier (Opel Vectra A) was discontinued and the Vauxhall Vectra (Opel Vectra B), the Cavalier's replacement, was introduced.

In all European markets, there were option stickers at the back of the window in white writing ('ABS' for example).

=== United Kingdom ===
When Daewoo arrived in the UK at the beginning of 1995, Daewoo was aiming the Espero to the Cavalier and Mondeo market, plus providing good promotions and offers in the package. This included a 3 year/60,000 mile warranty (this could be extended to a 5 year/100,000 mile warranty for an extra £350), a six-year anti-corrosion warranty, 3 years free servicing, maintenance and AA membership (which looked after breakdowns or accidents). Every replacement of parts were free, except for tyres. If the car broke down, needed servicing or was in an accident, they would bring a courtesy car. Once the vehicle was fixed, they gave the vehicle back and collected the courtesy car (this was in the AA membership). Plus, there was free delivery number plates, one-year free road tax and a full tank of petrol. There was also a free 'N' plate replacement for a free upgrade for the first 1,000 customers who bought a new Daewoo; it would then be replaced in August 1995. Daewoo also provided fixed prices (no haggling) and they claimed this was the best way of selling a car.

From 23 December 1996, another promotion was added, three years' free insurance.

==== Pricing ====
These were the listed prices in the UK:

GLXi: £10,695

CDi: £11,995

CDXi: £12,250

With all the options selected, Daewoo claimed these prices were up to 40% less than its competitors.

However, on 29 March 1996, Daewoo announced these prices were risen to the following (although the price of the 1.8 CDi remained the same) from 1 April 1996:

GLXi: £11,495

CDi: £11,995

CDXi: £12,995

Then, on 10 October 1996, Daewoo announced that the day after, they will extend the range of all their models with and without air-conditioning, so with the Espero GLXi, these were the following prices (* = without air-conditioning):

GLXi*: £10,995

GLXi: £11,495

CDi: £11,995

CDXi: £12,995

On 6 December 1996, Daewoo announced that from 9 December 1996 they will raise the prices of their range reflecting changes made to the vehicles for 1997 model year (Espero prices):

GLXi: £11,735

CDi: £12,375

CDXi: £13,735

==== Range, reviews and production halt ====
In the UK, the range consisted of three trim levels. The base model was the GLXi that had a 1.5 DOHC engine, GLXi emblems at the body wings and (some) boot, hubcaps, electric windows, ABS, power steering, drivers airbag, sunroof and radio/cassette. Air-conditioning was a free option (before, air-conditioning was an £880 option) so was automatic transmission from May 1996 onwards. Then, there was the CDi model which got a 1.8-litre SOHC engine for a step up, CDi emblems at the body wings and (some) '1.8 CDi' emblem at the boot though air-conditioning was standard. Alloy wheels were optional for the CDi model. Finally, there was the CDXi which had a 2.0-litre SOHC engine, CDXi emblems at the body wings, (some) '2.0 CDXi' emblem at the boot lid, alloy wheels and a CD player as well. From May 1996, a six-disc CD autochanger was standard on the 2.0 CDXi. All models got the same four-spoke steering wheel.

The Espero was also given an 'AUTOMATIC' badge at the boot lid for those which had an automatic transmission or (sometimes) a 'TWIN CAM 8v' badge on the 1.5 GLXi models. The dealer plates had the writing 'DAEWOO' in a black background with the phone number, a black line going through either side with the number plate ID under the number plate. In the UK, the Espero was not sold with a third brake light, a spoiler with a third brake light nor the three-spoke steering wheel.

When AA (Automobile Association) tested the Espero CDi in October 1995, they rated it high because of its aftersales package and equipment it provided but criticised because of its electrical issues and lacking some safety features. In conclusion, they claimed that it was like 'cash-and-carry groceries or 'flat-pack-furniture from a warehouse store' which meant it did the job as a decent family car but this lied to the fact that it was new at the time yet it was generously priced and equipped than anything else at the price.

Plus, AA (Automobile Association) later did an extension test in a revamped Espero 1.8 CDi in July 1996 to see their experience with it. They had a few niggles with it but as time moved on it had less problems. Overall, they claimed that ride and fuel economy is reasonable. In the 1996 revamp (although pre-facelifts were sold at the time), this included four-shot washer jets rather than two shot ones, door mirrors fold flush with body flanks, indicator fenders revised, rear light housings in boot less vulnerable, gear lever surround modified and a better RDS radio.

People were not sure what was the replacement for the Espero (though it was claimed to be the Leganza), but a new Daewoo range was added in September 1997 (Lanos, Nubira, Leganza) and in 1998 the Matiz. Despite this, the Espero was sold until December 1997 (late R reg examples).

==== Rarity ====
One of the main reasons the Espero became so rare was because of an ABS control module which was not only difficult to replace but also very expensive when it was faulty. This led to many MOT failures so many owners got rid of their Esperos. Plus, there were many electrical problems (central locking, wiper, radio, light faults). Also, their resale value was very low so it depreciated rapidly as soon as their warranties ran out so these are considered worth little value. Spare parts were also quite difficult to find as they did not sell well in the first place and the fact that because the Korean economy was affected, so Daewoo could not provide much spare parts. In Q4 2023, only 9 Esperos were left roadworthy in the UK out of the 16k on the road in 1999.

=== Poland ===
In Poland, there were only two models, GLX and CD. The base model 'GLX' came with a 1.5 litre DOHC engine, a three-spoke steering wheel, electric windows, hubcaps, (some) a third brake light and a 'DOHC 16V' badge at the back (for colour reasons, the badge is black if the car is white and white if the car is in another colour). No airbags were available for the GLX model. The pricier 'CD' model came with a 1.8 SOHC or a 2.0 SOHC engine, a four-spoke steering wheel with (some) a drivers airbag (though some still had a three-spoke one), and (some) air-conditioning.

The Espero was praised however for its durability and long-term reliability, so taxi drivers often used them.

Production started in 1996. Very shortly there was a facelift at the same year (revised door mirrors and indicator fenders). Poland was the last country to produce the Espero; local assembly ended in December 1999 with the last copies arriving in showrooms in early 2000.

When Auto Świat tested the Espero 2.0 CD back in January 1996, they claimed that it was decent to drive, spacious and had an outdated 80's interior design. In their conclusion its far-eastern competitors were doing a better job (Nissan Primera, Mazda 626) and the fact that 'attractive prices and rich furnishings will convince them of the "Korean" - and these are not the worst argument these days.'

=== Netherlands ===
In Netherlands, the market started in 1995 and terminated in 1997. There were two trim levels with three engines. The base model was named 'GLX' with a 1.5 DOHC engine and also what Poland got. Then, there was the second model which was named 'CD' and had either a 1.8 SOHC engine or a 2.0 SOHC engine. The 1.8 litre and the 2.0 litre had hubcaps as standard but some got air-conditioning. Automatic transmission, a spoiler and different types of alloy wheels were optional on all models.

Promotions were provided, this included a three-month/3,000 km refund period, three-year/50,000 km maintenance warranty, three-year/100,000 km warranty, three-year paint warranty and a six-year anti-corrosion warranty.

A facelift was introduced in 1996, including revamped door mirrors and indicator fenders. Limited edition models included the 'Executive', which was basically a more luxurious version of the Espero. The badges were located at the body wings, and it had alloy wheels, an automatic transmission and wooden trim inside for a more executive look. This was actually a package rather than a separate model. There was also the 'Colour Design' model, which had special type alloy wheels.

Depending on the specification, these were the following prices:

Espero Specifications and Prices in Netherlands
Trim Level	Engine Size (litres)	Fuel type	Transmission	New Prices
GLX	1.5	Petrol	Manual	€14,746
GLX	1.5	Petrol	Automatic	€16,288
CD	1.8	Petrol	Manual	€15,880
CD	1.8	Petrol	Automatic	€17,423
CD	2.0	Petrol	Manual	€17,468
CD	2.0	Petrol	Automatic	€19,011

=== Spain ===
The Espero was marketed as 'Aranos' because the word 'Espero' translated to 'I hope' or 'I wait'. Production started in 1995. There were two trim levels, 'GLX' and 'CDX'. The GLX was the base model which had a 1.5 DOHC engine with all other extras (power windows, power mirrors, hubcaps, (some) 'DOHC 16V' badge). Then there was the CDX which was available with either a 1.8 or a 2.0 SOHC engine. Other equipment included air-conditioning. A spoiler with a third brake light and different type alloy wheels were optional.

A facelift was introduced in 1996, including revamped door mirrors and indicator fenders.

== South America ==
=== Brazil ===
In 1994, the Espero was launched in the Brazilian market, imported from South Korea. Only one engine was available, the C20LE with multipoint fuel injection. The badging and details were just like the second facelift Espero in Korea (being in 1994). The following models were sold:

- Base Model (no added name)
- DLX
- CD

The CD was the top-of-the-range model which included all the necessary extras with some options: electric sunroof, "CD" emblems at body wings, leather seats, driver's side air bag, ABS, CD player, and automatic transmission. All models had the three-spoke steering wheel (see Poland section).

In 1995, the Espero was updated which included new badging, and minor changes to the exterior and interior. The rear "ESPERO" black badge remained. Only one trim level was available (CD). Some Espero's had a "2000i" emblem at the back to represent the engine type. Espero imports ceased in 1998.

== Australia ==
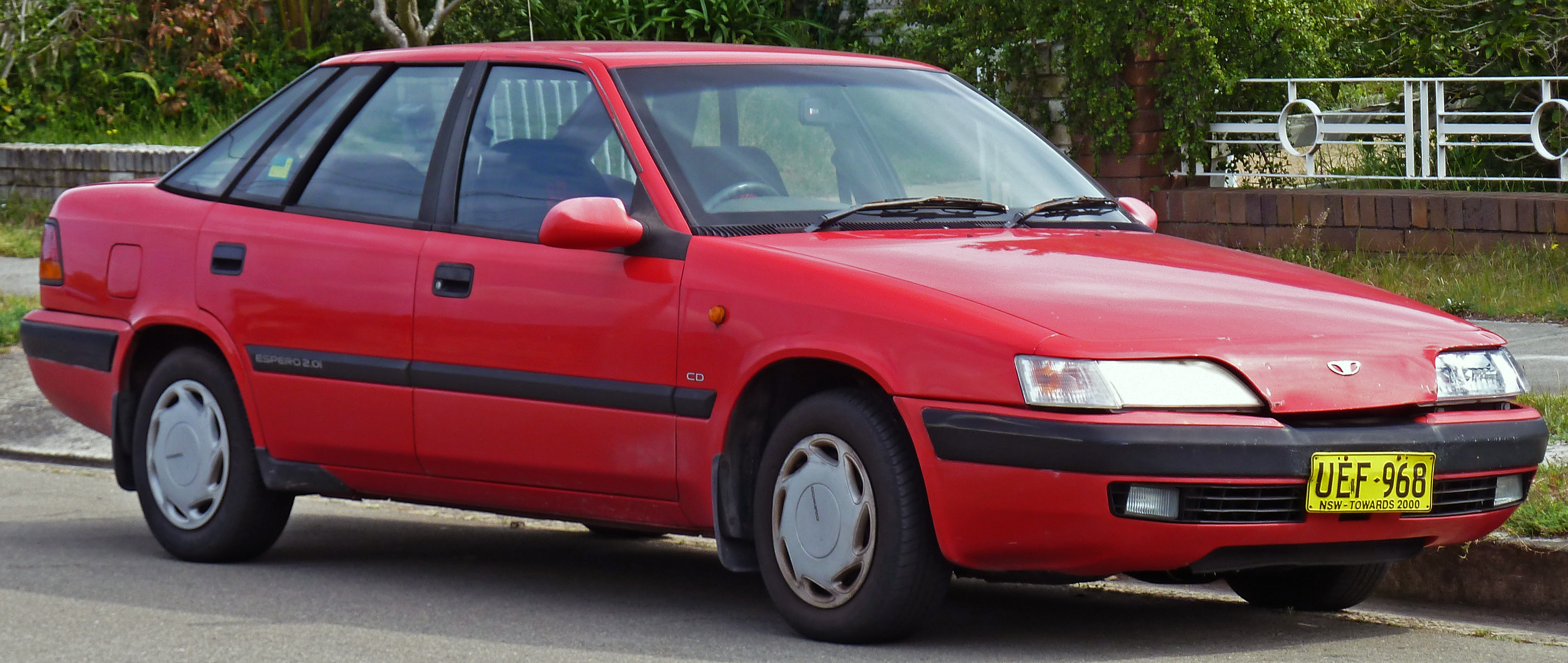

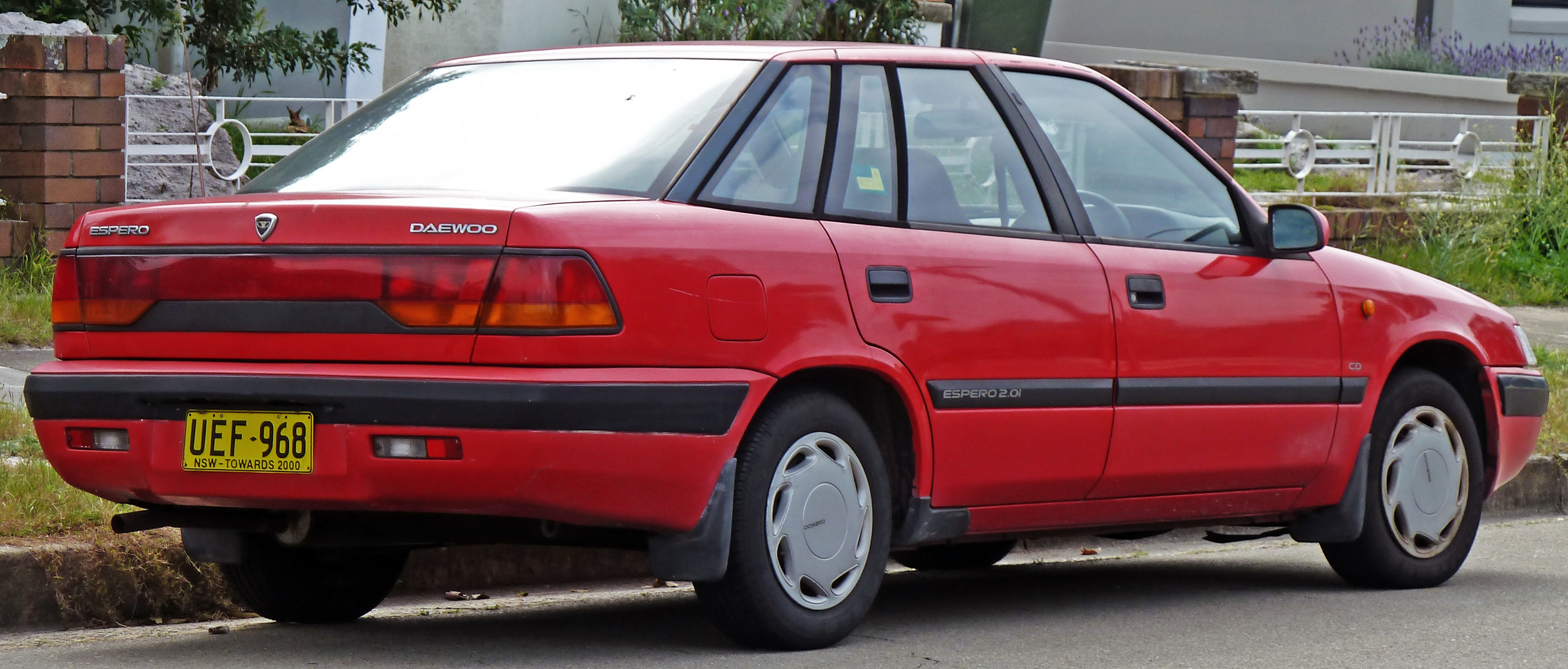
1995-1997 Daewoo Espero CD (Australia)

=== Advertising ===
When Daewoo first came in Australia, they used the slogan in their advert, "The Daewoo Espero. Beware of expensive imitations". They claimed the boot was bigger than the Commodore and the Falcon and they also provided promotions which included a (whichever came first) 3 year/100,000 km warranty. The starting price was from $23,750.

=== Production ===
In Australia it was sold from 1995 to 1997 before it was claimed to be replaced by the Leganza. Throughout its production, it was only powered by one engine, the 2.0 litre GM Family II engine. This engine was Australian built and was exported to other countries for assembly. There was also only one trim level, it was called the 'CD'. It was well equipped, this included all-round electric windows and electric mirrors, a five-speed manual gearbox, air-conditioning, power steering, remote trunk release and an AM/FM stereo radio with a CD player. There was also 'ESPERO 2.0i' emblems in white at the side skirts for the rear doors which no other markets have. The only optional items were a four-speed automatic transmission with overdrive and ABS/Airbag (combined safety option). The steering wheel was a three spoke design which was included for other markets (see Poland section) and the automatic transmission lever and writings had a different design as well.

In 1996, there was a facelift which included revamped wing mirrors and fender indicators.

== Social culture ==
=== Top Gear 1997 ===
In Top Gear 1997, the Espero was placed 39th out of 120 in an 'N' registration JD power survey. This was due to the fact that it had too many electrical and miscellaneous problems.

Also, Top Gear tested out both Nexia and Espero models to see the experience of how they fared against its rivals. They said the way the Espero drove was 'pretty dull and undynamic' because it had ancient Vauxhall Cavalier mechanicals however reliability was reasonable, the resale value was average and according to the people's experience they were well-warrantied, reliable and a manufacturer who cared more than most.

== Design Quirks ==
The Espero had some unusual quirks unlike some of its rivals:

- Door catches at armrest
- Interior 'wrap around' front door card air vents (European Models)
- Twisting badge anti-clockwise and locks in position to get at keyhole for the boot lid (once twisted, the key the badge would revert to normal position) (Not available in pre-facelift for Korea)
