= Daewoo Leganza =

Daewoo Leganza (V100)
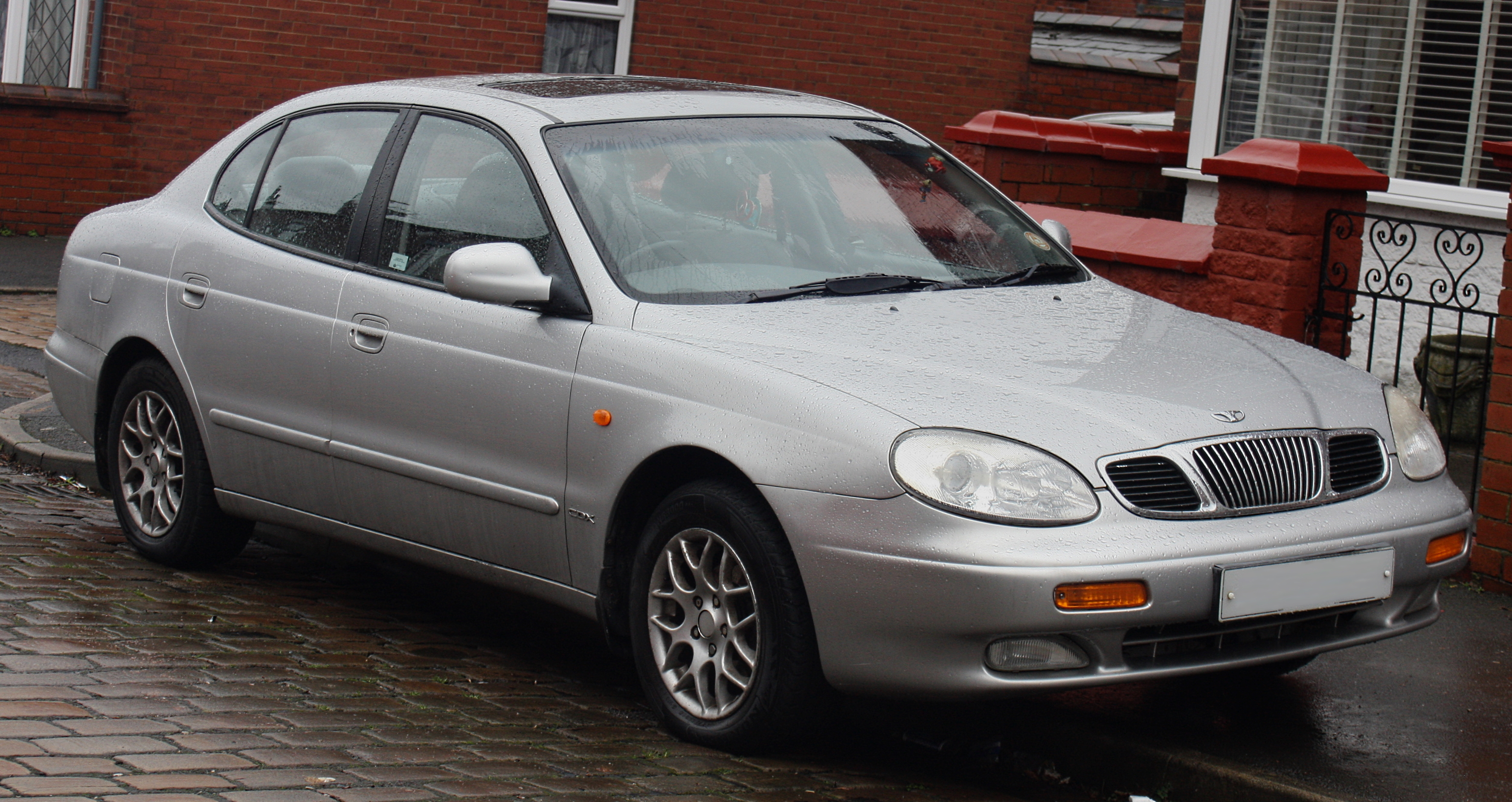

Overview
- Manufacturer: Daewoo
- Also called: Doninvest Kondor (Russia)
- Production: 1997–2002 (South Korea, UK); 1997–2008 (Egypt); 1998–2000 (Vietnam); 1998–2002 (Romania)
- Assembly: Bupyong, South Korea (Daewoo Motors); Cairo, Egypt (Speranza); Zaporizhzhia, Ukraine (AvtoZAZ); Warsaw, Poland (FSO); Craiova, Romania (Rodae); Hanoi, Vietnam (VIDAMCO)
- Designer: Giorgetto Giugiaro at Italdesign

Body and chassis
- Class: Mid-size car/large family car (D)
- Body style: 4-door sedan
- Layout: FF layout
- Related: Daewoo Magnus; Daewoo Tosca

Powertrain
- Engine: 2.0 L X20SED I4; 2.2 L X22SE I4
- Transmission: 5-speed manual; 4-speed ZF 4HP14 automatic; 4-speed GM 4T40E automatic; 4-speed Aisin 50-42LE automatic

Dimensions
- Wheelbase: 2,670 mm (105.1 in)
- Length: 4,671 mm (183.9 in)
- Width: 1,779 mm (70.0 in)
- Height: 1,437 mm (56.6 in)
- Curb weight: ~1,400 kg (3,086 lb)

Chronology
- Predecessor: Daewoo Espero; Daewoo Prince
- Successor: Daewoo Magnus

The Daewoo Leganza is an executive car (E-segment), sometimes classified as luxury large family car (D-segment), that was manufactured and marketed by the automobile manufacturer Daewoo. The Leganza was only available as a front engine, front-wheel drive, four-door, five-passenger sedan in South Korea over a single generation for model years 1997-2002 and was internally designated as the V100.

The Leganza replaced mid-size luxury car Daewoo Prince and was succeeded by the Daewoo Magnus (V200) using a new V200 platform. The name Leganza was a portmanteau of the Italian words elegante (elegant) and forza (power).

== Development ==
The Leganza (V100), along with Lanos (T100) and Nubira (J100) were central to Daewoo's effort to develop a proprietary range to replace vehicles previously licensed from GM.

Daewoo turned to global consultants and suppliers in developing the three new lines. Under design direction of ex-Porsche and ex BMW engineering chief Dr. Ulrich Bez, the Leganza was developed in just 30 months, using Daewoo's growing in-house R&D network in Korea, Worthing and Munich along with other global consultants. Transmissions were provided by ZF and engines were sourced from GM Australia.

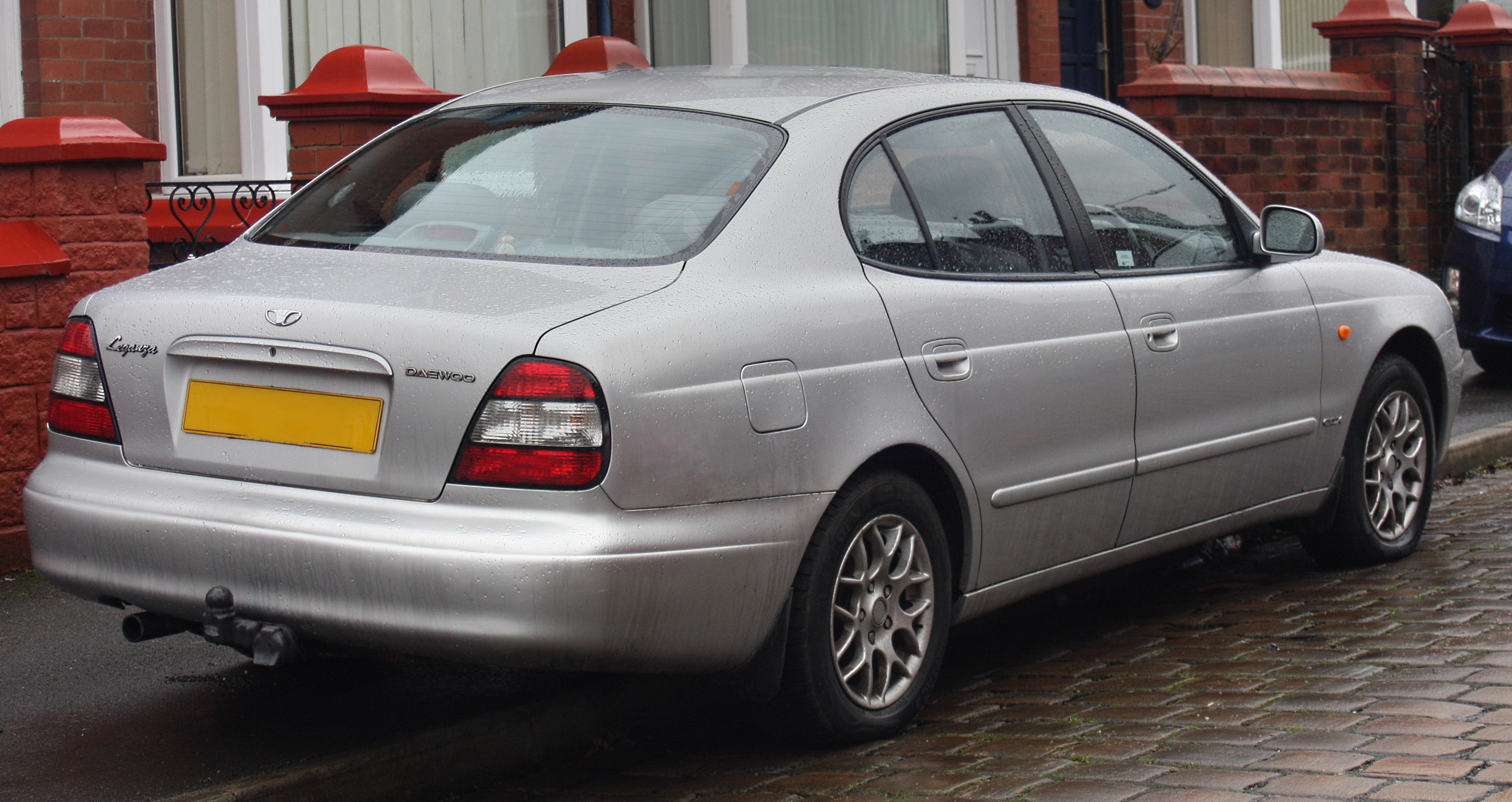
2002 Daewoo Leganza (V100) CDX sedan (United Kingdom)

The Leganza was styled by Giorgetto Giugiaro of Italdesign, using the themes developed for Giugiaro's 1990 Jaguar Kensington concept, which also heavily influenced the 1991 Toyota Aristo (sold as the first generation Lexus GS outside of Japan). Styling was also compared to the Maserati Coupé, another of Giugiaro's designs. Bodywork achieved a Cd of 0.32 Cd.

Development of the Leganza began at the end of 1993, after work began on the Lanos and the Nubira, delaying the Leganza introduction in some markets. After initial research of the Leganza leading to development of a mid-size executive car, further work on the V100 (prototype name) began. Styling took three months, the summer of 1994, aided by ItalDesign's offices in Kensington. Road tests began in May 1995, ended exactly a year later, and the Leganza was ready for production in February 1997.

== Equipment ==
In various markets, the base Leganza was offered with a 2.0L 4-cylinder engine, 5-speed manual, hubcaps, cloth trim and all the standard power options. It had an optional 4-speed, hydraulically operated transmission. Ride quality was poor, as was cabin noise intrusion. In 1999, Daewoo made revisions to the model. The automatic transmission was replaced by an electronically controlled automatic transmission. The engine was upgraded to a 2.2 L version (with the 2-litre model remaining in many markets), which boosted power from 98 to 99 kW (133 to 135 PS; 131 to 133 hp), giving better performance but also increasing fuel consumption. The Leganza also gained standard 15-inch alloy wheels, anti-theft alarm, and remote central locking. The suspension was revised. In 2001 Daewoo introduced the "Limited Edition" trim level with leather upholstery, faux woodgrain trim, and a power driver's seat. In 2002 offered the trim level again, adding an anti-theft alarm, alloy wheels and remote locking.

== Marketing ==
Launched in 1997, the Leganza replaced both the Espero and larger Prince. Daewoo rapidly expanded their distribution network with the inception of new models, offering the Leganza globally. Daewoo placed special emphasis on developing markets, which involved the assembly of Leganzas in countries like Poland, Romania, Ukraine, Russia and Uzbekistan, in plants owned by Daewoo or under license agreements. Nevertheless, this concerned CKD or SKD assembly only. All Leganzas were effectively made at Daewoo's Bupyong plant in Korea.

At the time it was launched, the Leganza was a bit longer than most mid-size European or Asian cars, and was marketed as an inexpensive executive car in some markets.

=== United Kingdom ===
The Leganza's market began in Autumn 1997 along with the Lanos and Nubira. It was a replacement slightly larger than the Espero. The same aftersales package were given, including a 3 years/60,000-mile warranty, 3 years free servicing, parts and labor, 3 years AA cover and 100 free cars were given out for a year to test customers' experience with them to examine the customer satisfaction. This was extended to a free one years' free insurance for 1998.

Trim levels were the SX and CDX with the following equipment:

SX – ABS, twin airbags, air-con, keyless entry, power steering, electric sunroof and electric heated mirrors

CDX – (equipment over SX) alloy wheels, traction control, speed-sensitive power steering, full climate control, outside temperature display, front foglamps, ultrasonic alarm, upgraded seat coverings, wood effect and chrome trim and a leather covered steering wheel.

Prices for the SX started from £13,795 and for the CDX, £14,995. Auto transmission and a full leather trim with a driver's power seat were available as options for £500. The 2.0 litre 'D-Tec' engine was the only engine available. With the aftersales package and its engines, the Leganza was cheaper to operate than some of its rivals: The Leganza SX was given a cost-per-mile figure of just 24.9 pence, around ten percent lower than comparables from other brands.

In May 1998, Daewoo launched an additional version of the Leganza, the CDX-E. The difference was that it featured the Philips CARiN satellite navigation system with full in-car entertainment, 10-Disc CD autochanger, leather upholstery, new 15-inch (38 cm) alloy wheels and luxury mats. On-the-road price was £17,520. It was an addition to the CDX, rather than replacing it.

=== Russia ===
1999 Doninvest Kondor (Russia)

The Leganza was also briefly marketed as the Doninvest Kondor, a version assembled by the Russian Doninvest corporation on Taganrog's TagAZ. The Kondor was poorly equipped compared to other Leganzas, with airbags not even available as an option.

== Driveline ==
The Leganza was a front-wheel-drive car, available with a four-door sedan body only. The Leganza was powered by Holden-sourced D-TEC DOHC 16V I4 engines (two displacements were made using the same block and bore, differing in stroke):

- 2.0 L (1998 cc) – 131 hp (98 kW; 133 PS) at 5,400 rpm, 185 N⋅m (136 lb⋅ft) at 4,600 rpm of torque – used in models sold in Europe.
- 2.2 L (2198 cc) – 133 hp (99 kW; 135 PS) at 5,200 rpm, 200 N⋅m (148 lb⋅ft) at 2,800 rpm of torque – used mainly for the American and Australian market.

Both engines came with either a 5-speed manual transmission, or a 4-speed automatic.

== Electric and Hybrid versions ==
From 1997 to 1999, several electric and hybrid Leganza prototypes were created in Korea, all painted white. One of these prototypes was called the 'Leganza NGV'. Only one copy was shown at the Seoul Motor Show 1997. The interiors of these Leganza NGV's were also modified and it was possible that they did not have a rear seat.

== Successor ==
2000 Daewoo Leganza SX (North America)

Daewoo increased the wheelbase of the V100 platform by 30 mm (1.2 in) to develop a new model, marketed as the Daewoo Magnus (V200), which launched in 2000. Both models were sold side by side in South Korea, and the Leganza received a small update (front grille) in 2001. The Magnus was not launched internationally until the Leganza's demise in 2002, effectively replacing it. Daewoo had ceased North American sales by then, and the V200 was released as the Suzuki Verona in the United States and the Chevrolet Epica in Canada.

There was no successor in the United Kingdom or Ireland until the launch of the Daewoo Tosca under the nameplate of Chevrolet Epica in 2007.
