= Aksai =

Aksai may refer to:

- Aksay Kazakh Autonomous County, an autonomous county in Gansu Province, People's Republic of China
- Aksai Chin, a region located at the juncture of China, India and Pakistan

== See also ==
- Aksay (disambiguation)
