= Daewoo Prince =

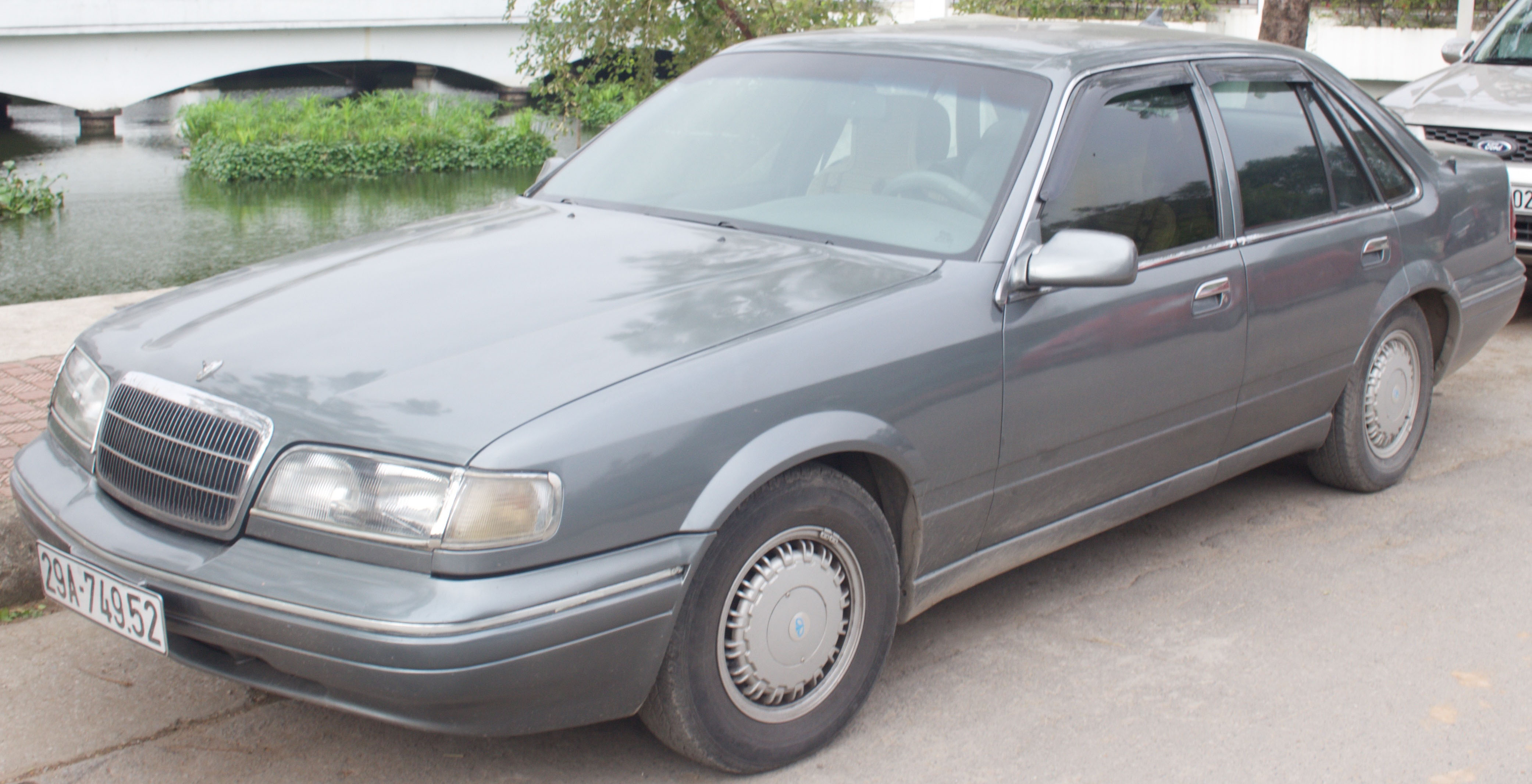
- Daewoo Super Salon

Overview
- Manufacturer: Daewoo
- Also called: Daewoo Brougham; Daewoo Super Salon
- Production: June 1991 – July 1997; July 1993 – September 1999 (LPG Taxi models)
- Assembly: South Korea: Bupyeong

Body and chassis
- Body style: 4-door sedan
- Layout: FR layout
- Platform: GM V
- Related: Opel Rekord E

Dimensions
- Wheelbase: 2,690 mm (105.9 in)
- Length: 4,798–4,890 mm (188.9–192.5 in)
- Width: 67.7 in (1,720 mm)
- Curb weight: 1,280–1,450 kg (2,820–3,200 lb)

Chronology
- Predecessor: Daewoo Royale
- Successor: Daewoo Leganza (Prince); Daewoo Chairman (Brougham and Super Salon)

The Daewoo Prince is a mid-size luxury car that was produced by Daewoo in South Korea between 1991 and 1999. The car was based on the rear-wheel drive Opel Rekord E, although the body was of Daewoo design, as opposed to the Opel-designed, Holden-manufactured body of the Prince's Royale predecessor. The Prince was powered by 1.8- and 2.0-litre Opel Family II four-cylinder engines. The Prince spawned two additional variants, the Daewoo Brougham and the Daewoo Super Salon. The base Prince was replaced by the Leganza, while the more luxurious Brougham and Super Salon were succeeded by the Daewoo Chairman in 1997, Taxi models continued in production until September 1999.

== Gallery ==
=== Daewoo Prince ===
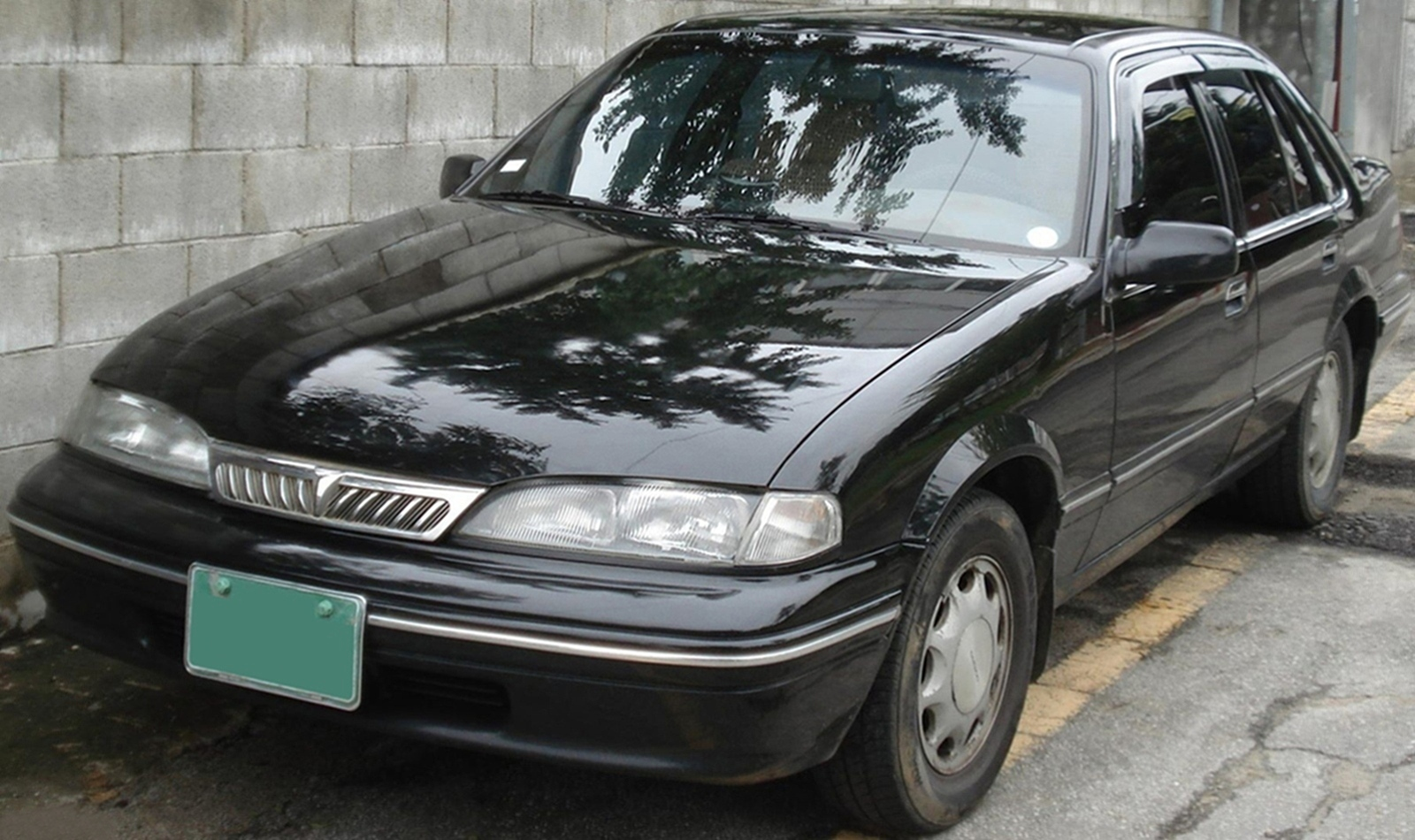
Daewoo Prince (pre-facelift)

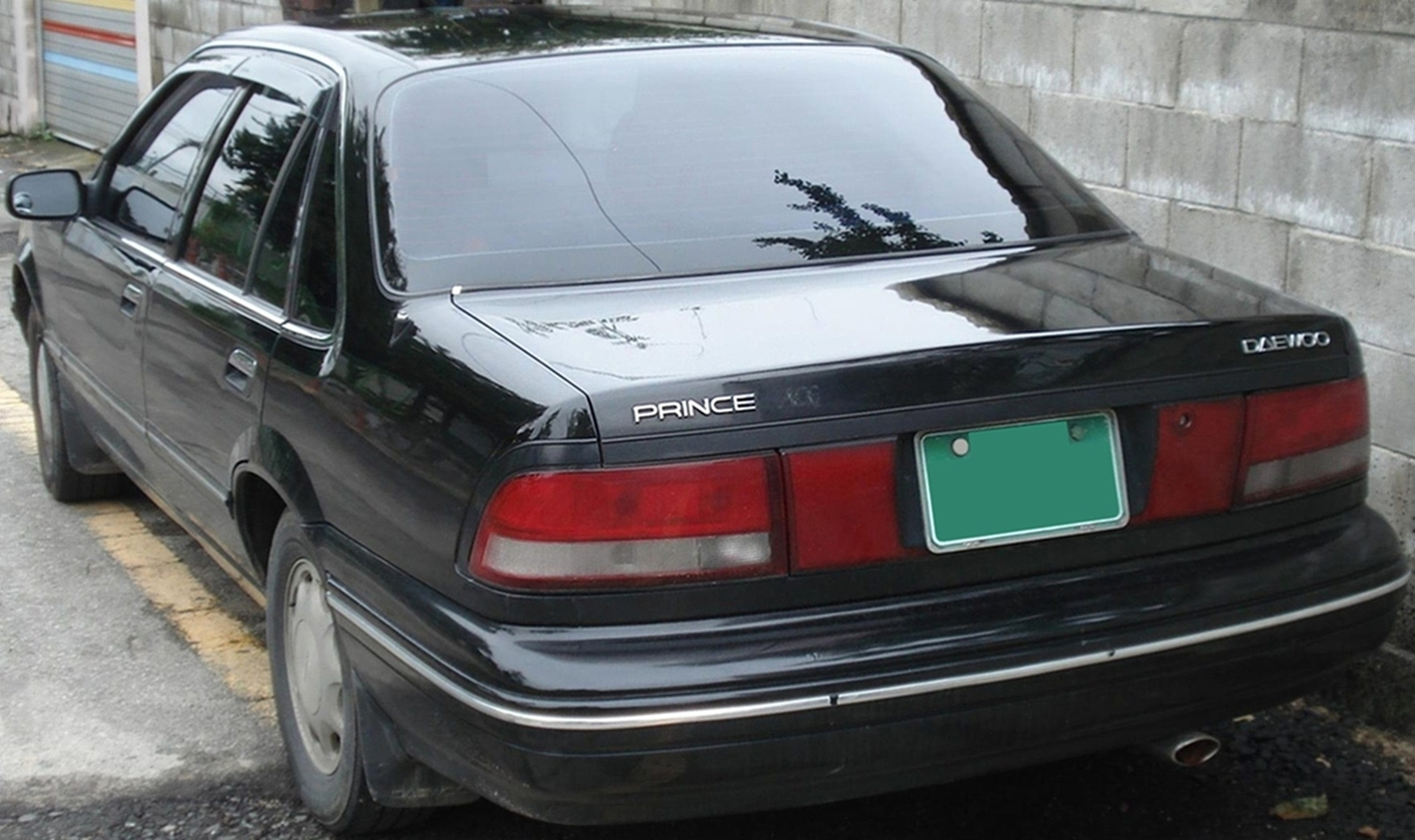
Rear view

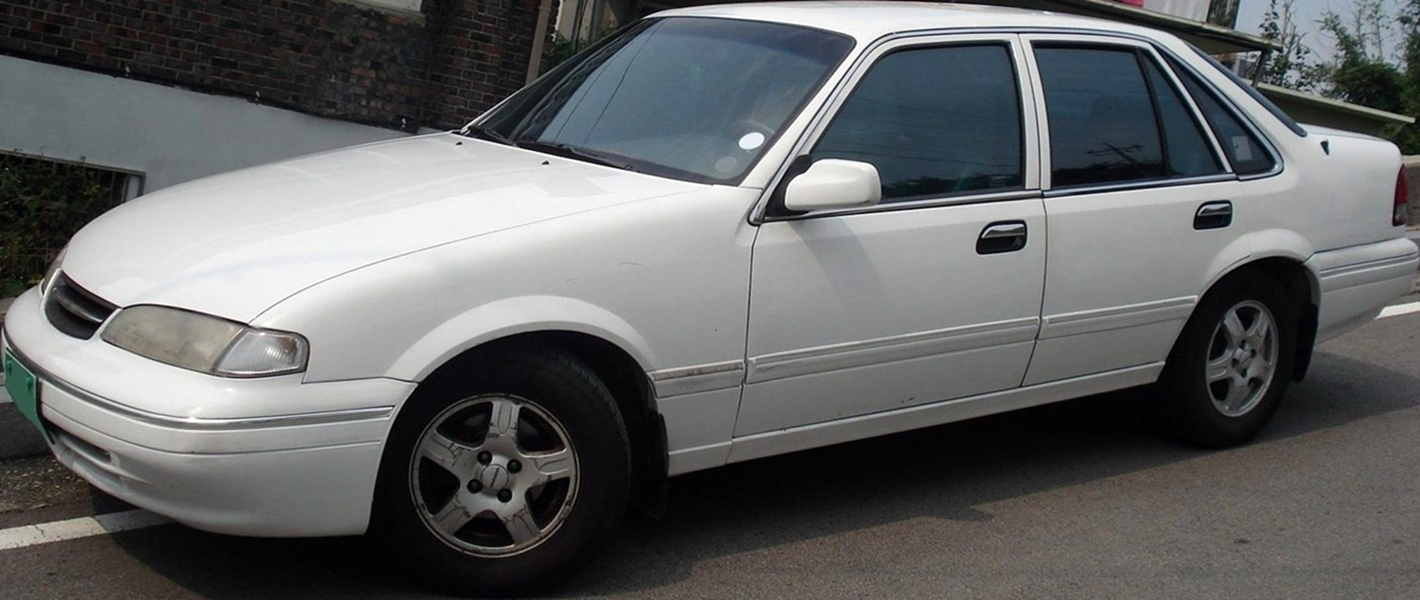
Daewoo Prince (facelift)

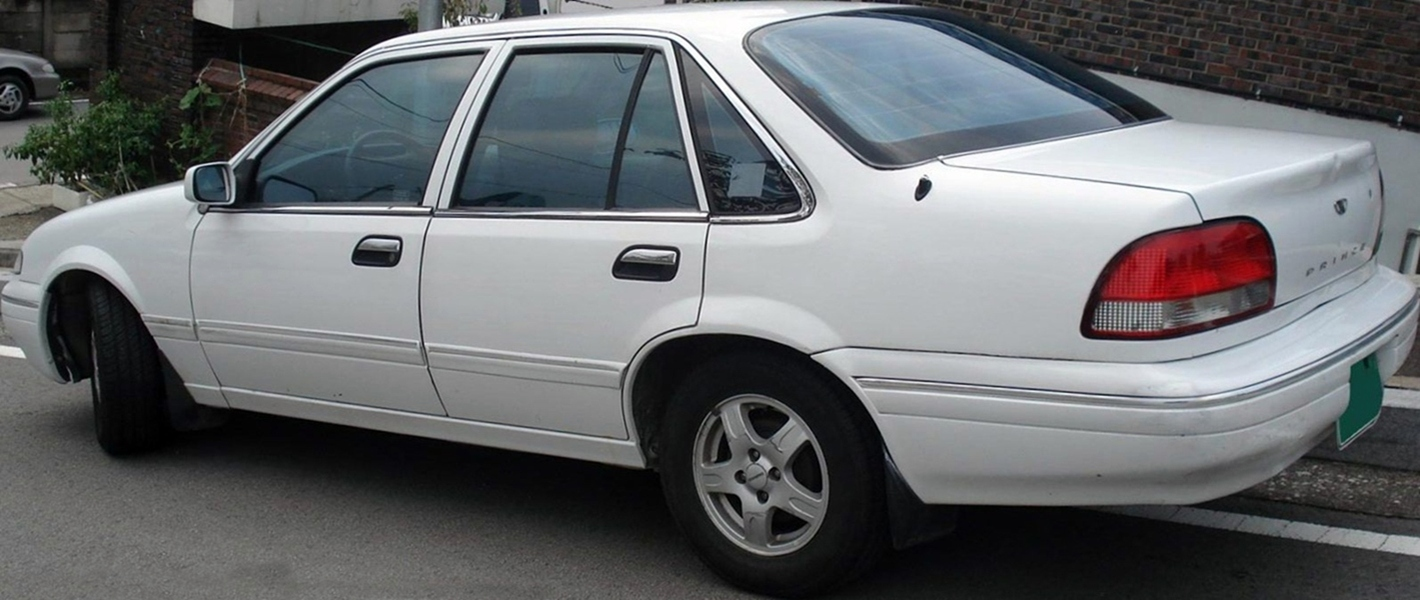
Rear view

=== Daewoo Brougham ===
Daewoo Brougham

Rear view

=== Daewoo Super Salon ===
Daewoo Super Salon

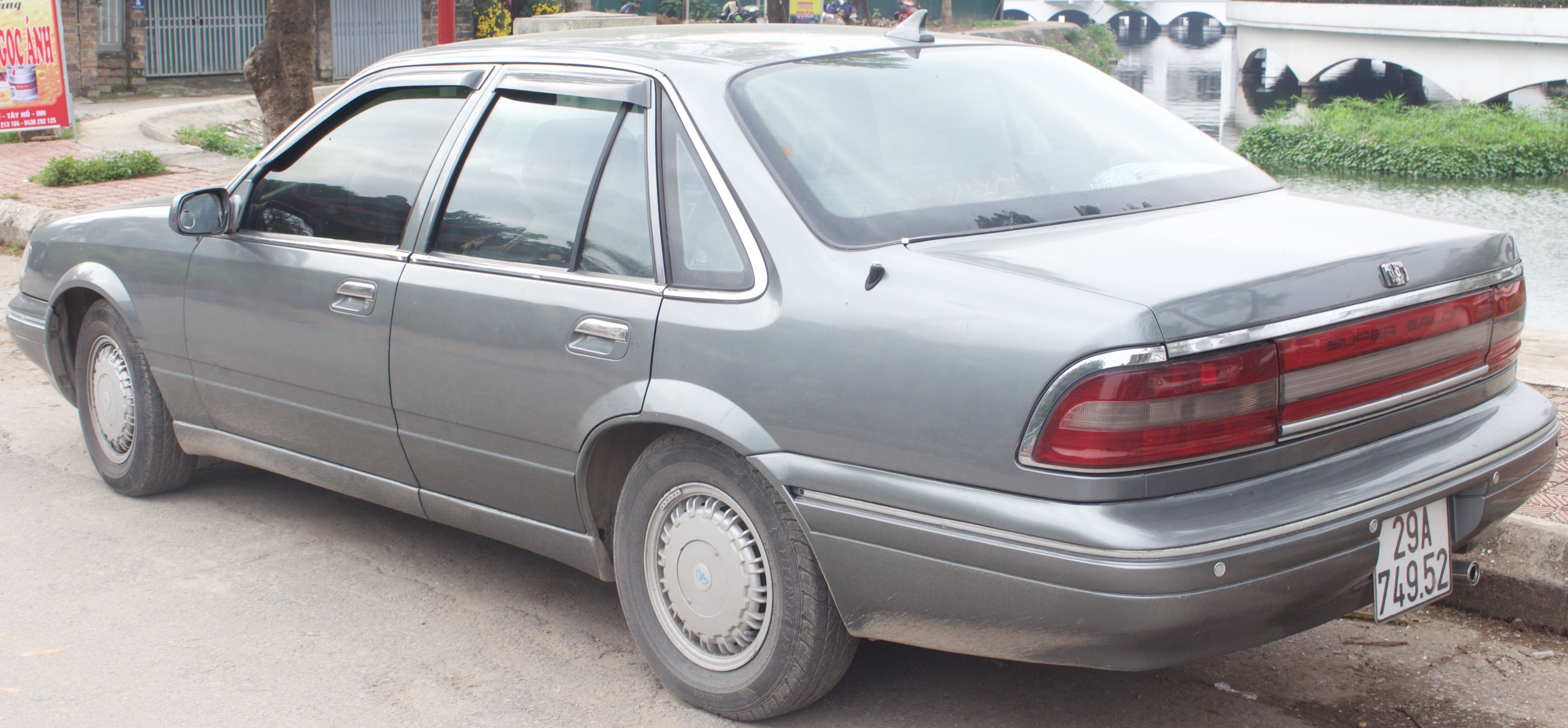
Rear view

== Technical data ==
Daewoo Prince	1.8	2.0	2.0 DOHC
Engine:	4-cylinder-inline engine (four-stroke)		
Displacement:	1796 cc	1998 cc	
Bore x Stroke:	84.8 x 79.5 mm	86 x 86 mm	
Max. Power at rpm:	95 PS (70 kW; 94 hp) at 5,400	110 PS (81 kW; 108 hp) at 5,400	136 PS (100 kW; 134 hp) at 5,600
Max. Torque at rpm:	145 N⋅m (107 lb⋅ft) at 2,800	167 N⋅m (123 lb⋅ft) at 2,800	184 N⋅m (136 lb⋅ft) at 4,000
Compression Ratio:	8.8:1	8.8:1	
Fuel System:	Injection		
Valvetrain:	OHC		DOHC
Cooling:	Water		
Gearbox:	5-speed-manual or 4-speed-automatic, rear wheel drive		
Front Suspension:	Trailing arms, struts, coil springs, anti-roll bar		
Rear suspension::	Rigid axle, trailing arms, coil springs, anti-roll bar		
Brakes:	Front disc brakes (Ø 236 mm (9.3 in)), rear drum brakes		
Steering:	Rack-and-pinion		
Body:	Steel monocoque		
Track front/rear:	1,435 mm (56.5 in) / 1,410 mm (56 in)		
Wheelbase:	2,670 mm (105 in)		
L x W x H:	Prince: 4,800 mm (190 in) x 1,720 mm (68 in) x 1,420 mm (56 in) mm Super Salon: 4,890 mm (193 in) x 1,720 mm (68 in) x 1,420 mm (56 in) mm		
Weight:	from 1,280 kg (2,820 lb)		
Top speed: (estimates)	180 km/h (112 mph)	185 km/h (115 mph)	200 km/h (124 mph)
0–100 km/h (0−62 mph):	not available		
Fuel consumption (estimates):	11.0 litres per 100 kilometres (26 mpg_{‑imp}; 21.4 mpg_{‑US})	12.0 litres per 100 kilometres (23.5 mpg_{‑imp}; 19.6 mpg_{‑US})	12.0 litres per 100 kilometres (23.5 mpg_{‑imp}; 19.6 mpg_{‑US})
