= Jaguar Kensington =

Overview
- Also called: Italdesign Kensington
- Production: 1990
- Designer: Giorgetto Giugiaro at Italdesign

Body and chassis
- Class: Concept car
- Body style: 4-door fastback
- Layout: FR layout
- Related: Jaguar XJ12 (Series 3)

Powertrain
- Engine: 5.3 L Jaguar V12 engine
- Transmission: 3-speed automatic

Dimensions
- Wheelbase: 2,865 mm (112.8 in)

The Jaguar Kensington is a concept car designed and built by Italdesign for Jaguar. It debuted as a non-running, full-size mock up at the 1990 Geneva Motor Show, and later as a fully functioning prototype at the 1990 British International Motor Show.

== History ==
The Kensington was designed by Italdesign as a possible successor to the then current Jaguar XJ. It featured a sleeker design and swoopy roofline, with the intention by Giugiaro being to move away from the XJ's conventional three box design and update it for the 1990s. Jaguar did not end up putting the Kensington into production, and later the design was adapted by Italdesign for the smaller, front wheel drive Daewoo Leganza. Some reviewers have theorized that the first generation Lexus GS, also designed by Italdesign, was also an evolution of the Kensington's design, but Italdesign clarified that the GS concept was developed in 1988, long before the Kensington.

== Specifications ==
The Kensington is based on the Series 3 Jaguar XJ12 chassis and uses that car's 5.3 L (5345 cc) Jaguar V12 engine producing 295 hp (220 kW; 299 PS) at 5500 rpm and 432 N⋅m (319 lb⋅ft) of torque at 3250 rpm. Power is sent to the rear wheels through a GM 3-speed automatic transmission. The wheelbase of the XJ12 was left unchanged but the new body featured a 121 mm (4.8 in) longer front overhang, 185 mm (7.3 in) shorter rear overhang and a 25 mm (1.0 in) higher roof.
