= Daewoo Nubira =

Daewoo Nubira (J100)
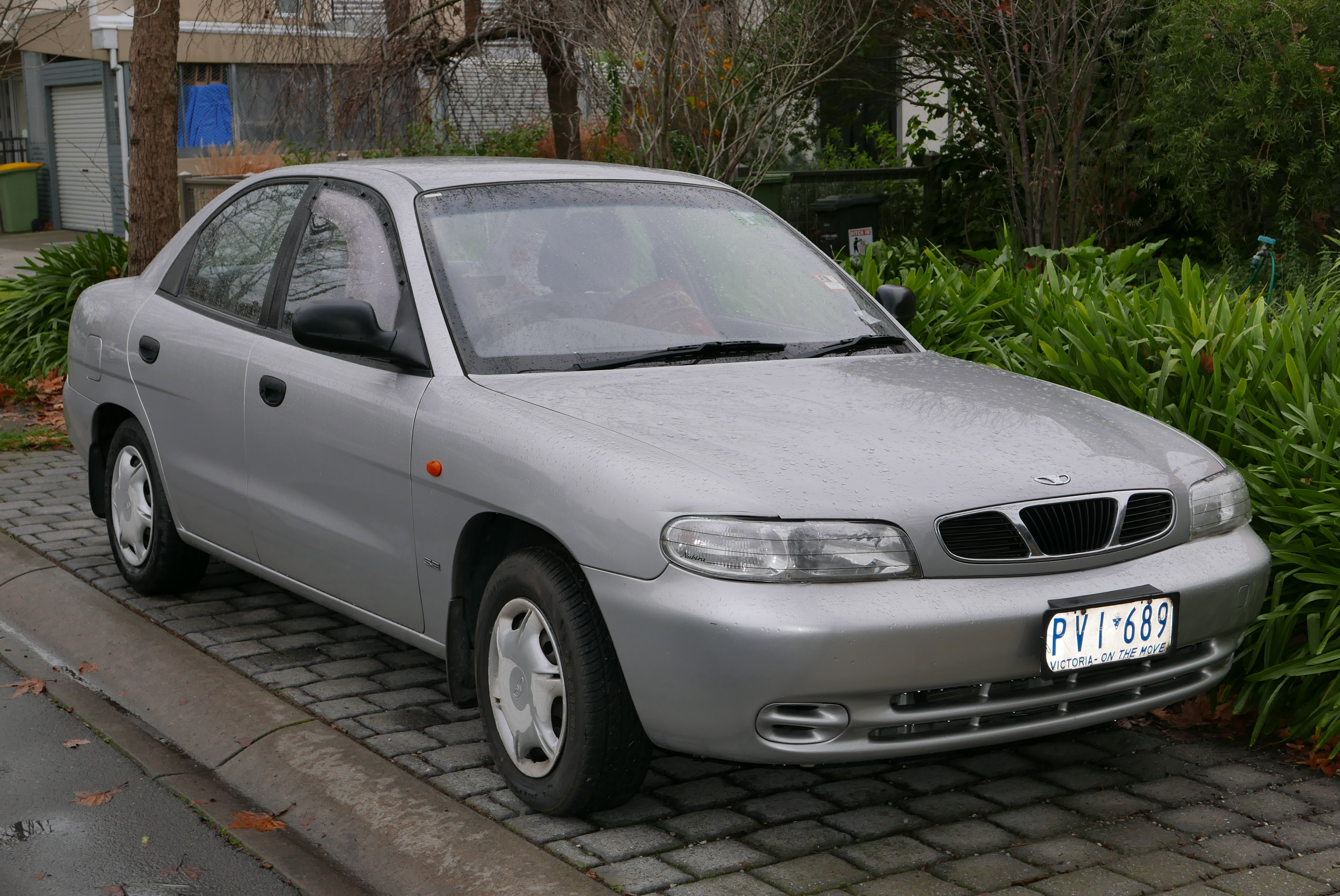
- Daewoo Nubira 4-door sedan (J100; pre-facelift)

Overview
- Manufacturer: Daewoo
- Also called: Doninvest Orion (Russia)
- Production: 1997–2002 (South Korea); 1998–2008 (Romania); 1997–2009 (CKD and license-built models)
- Assembly: Gunsan, South Korea; Cairo, Egypt (Daewoo Motors Egypt: 1998–2012); Craiova, Romania (Rodae); Zaporizhzhia, Ukraine (AvtoZAZ); Warsaw, Poland (FSO); Hanoi, Vietnam (VIDAMCO)
- Designer: Justyn Norek and Francois Lampreia at I.DE.A Institute

Body and chassis
- Class: Compact car (C)
- Body style: 4-door sedan 5-door hatchback 5-door station wagon
- Layout: Front-engine, front-wheel-drive

Powertrain
- Engine: 1.3 L Family 1 I4 (gasoline); 1.5 L Family 1 I4 (gasoline); 1.6 L Family 1 I4 (gasoline); 1.8 L Family II I4 (gasoline); 2.0 L Family II I4 (gasoline)
- Transmission: 5-speed Daewoo D-20 manual; 4-speed ZF 4HP14 automatic; 4-speed GM 4T40-E automatic

Dimensions
- Wheelbase: 2,570 mm (101.2 in)
- Length: 4,247 mm (167.2 in) (hatchback); 4,468 mm (175.9 in) (1997–00 sedan); 4,514 mm (177.7 in) (1997–00 wagon); 4,496 mm (177.0 in) (2000–02 sedan); 4,547 mm (179.0 in) (2000–02 wagon)
- Width: 1,699 mm (66.9 in); 1,720 mm (67.7 in) (2000–02 wagon)
- Height: 1,425 mm (56.1 in) (1997–00); 1,433 mm (56.4 in) (1997–00 wagon); 1,430 mm (56.3 in) (2000–02 sedan); 1,471 mm (57.9 in) (2000–02 wagon)

Chronology
- Predecessor: Daewoo Nexia; Daewoo Espero (South Korea)
- Successor: Daewoo Lacetti

Daewoo Nubira is a compact car which was produced by the South Korean automaker Daewoo from 1997 to 2002 as a 4-door sedan, 5-door hatchback and a 5-door station wagon.

== First generation (J100; 1997) ==
=== Overview ===
The Daewoo Nubira (J100 platform) was released in 1997 reflecting Daewoo's new found design and manufacturing process. Production took under 30 months by ex-Porsche and BMW engineering chief Dr. Ulrich Bez (later of Aston Martin), with Daewoo's growing in-house R&D network in Korea, Worthing and Munich collaborating with the world's best engineering consultancies. Styling was done by I.DE.A Institute in Italy, and other companies involved in the development programme included Ricardo and GM Holden. Built in Kunsan, South Korea in a factory equipped with sophisticated laser-guided robots, it was developed as a replacement. People weren't entirely sure what was the replacement, but Daewoo said that not only did it replace the lower and medium specification of the Espero, but also those at the upper end line-up of the Nexia.

The name Nubira (누비라) is the command form of the Korean verb Nubida (누비다), meaning to crisscross. Thus the name was chosen to convey the aspiration that this car would be seen crisscrossing every corner of the globe.

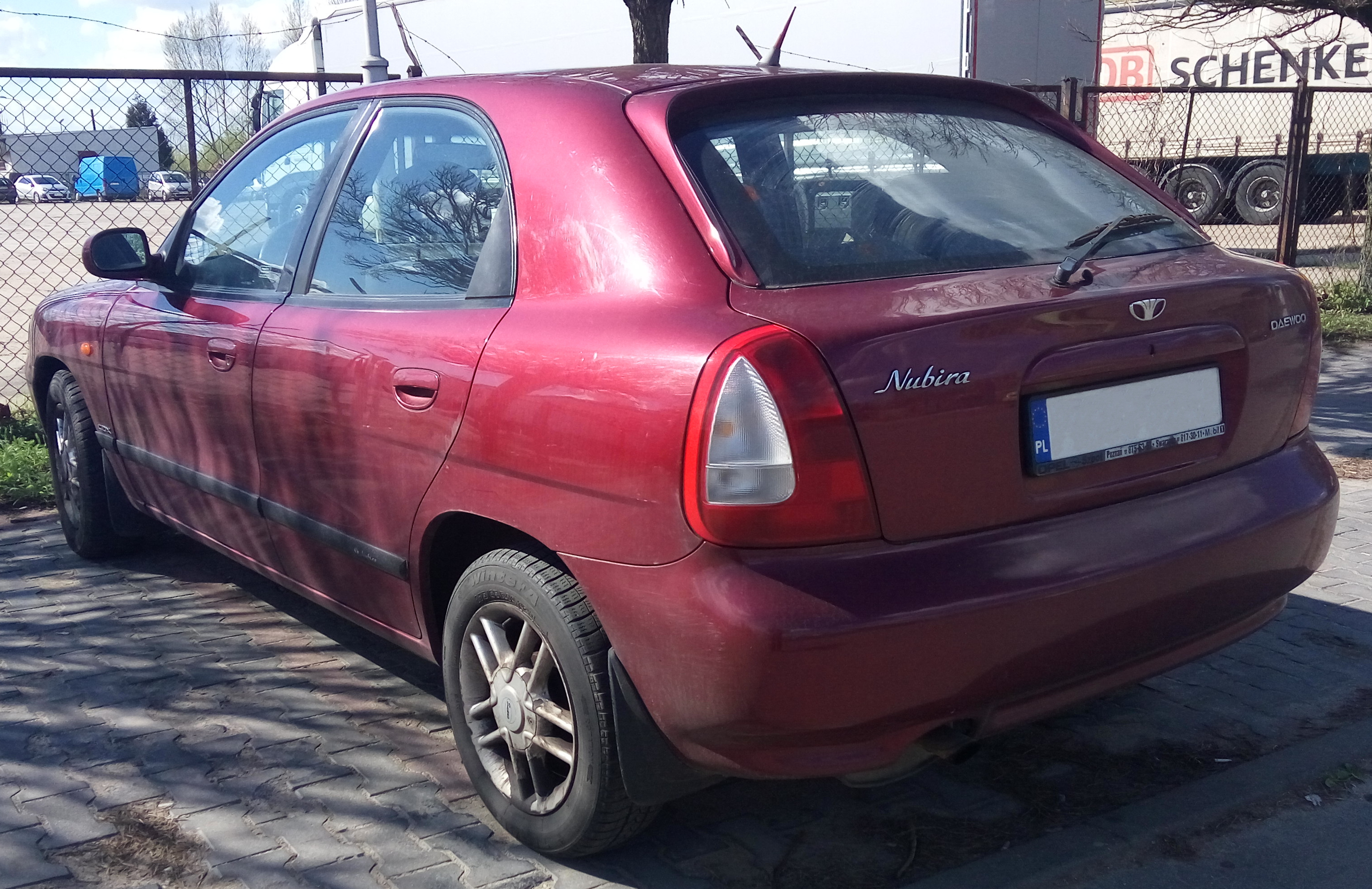
Daewoo Nubira hatchback

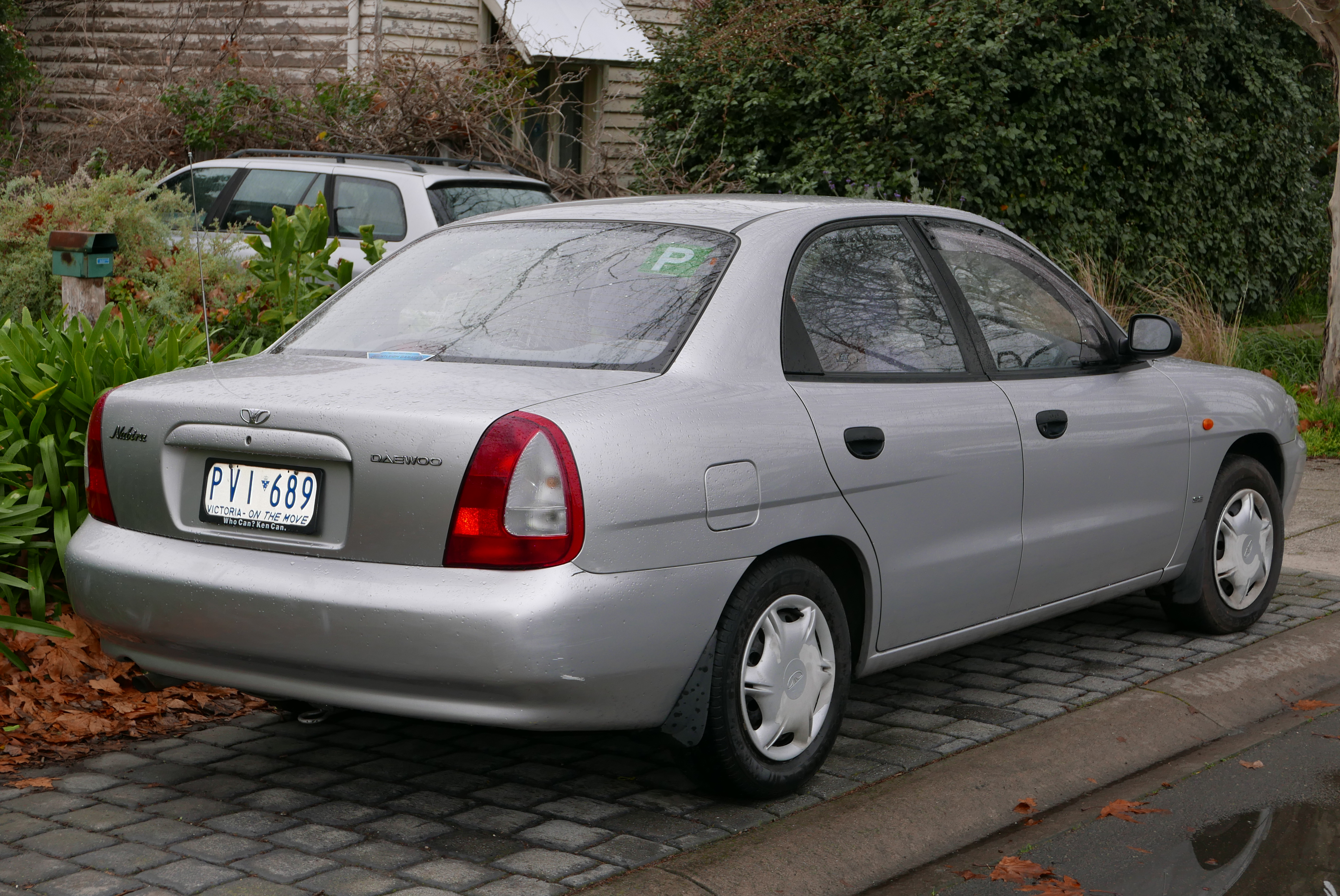
1999 Daewoo Nubira sedan (Australia)

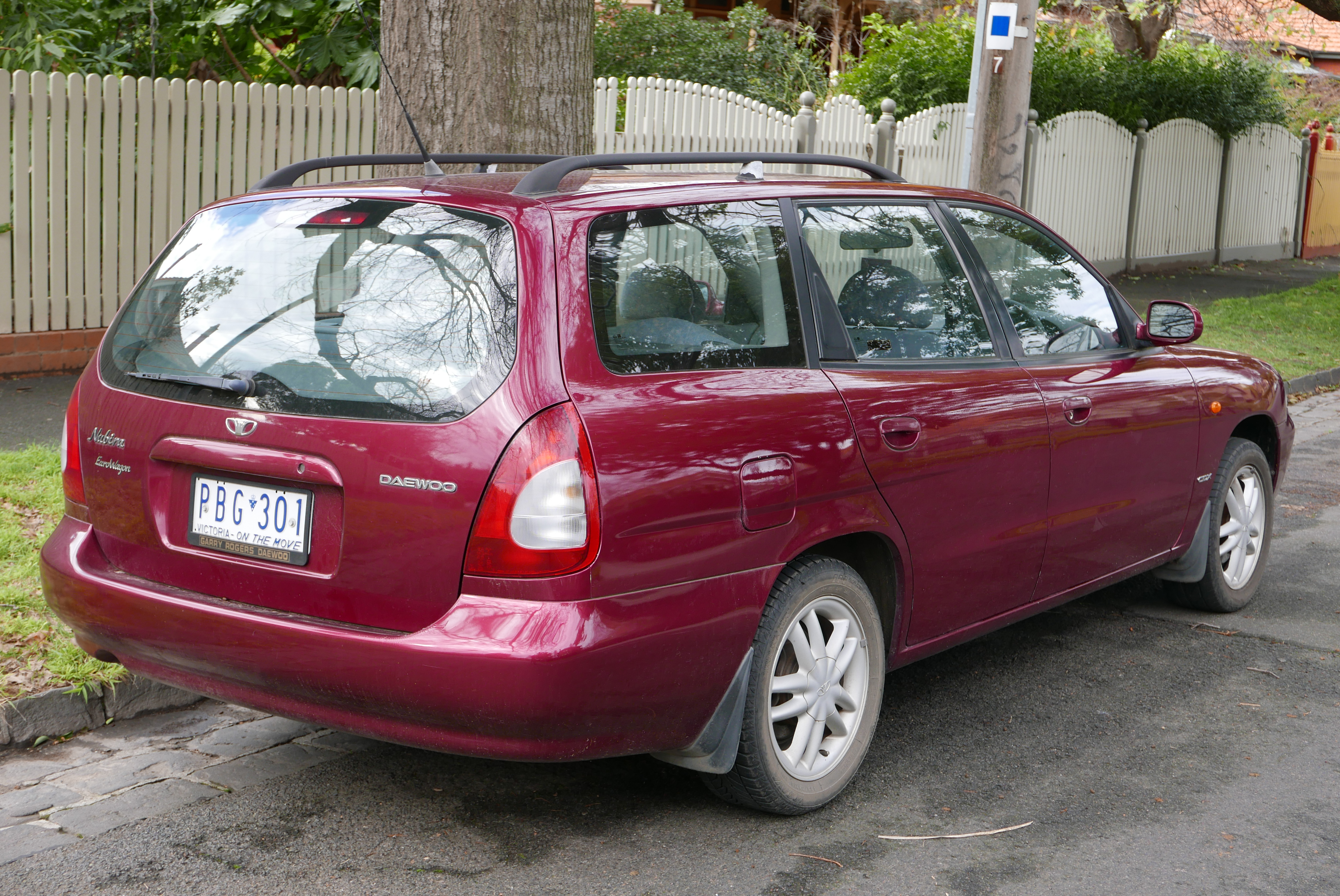
1998 Daewoo Nubira station wagon (Australia)

FSO-made Daewoo Nubira (Poland)

The Nubira II (J150) (facelift) was released for the 2000 model year. Over 90 improvements were made by Daewoo's Worthing Technical Centre in the United Kingdom, including an increase in passenger space and a decrease in noise, harshness and vibration (by adding a fourth engine mount and retuning the intake resonators for example). Offset crash performance was further improved in the second generation, as demonstrated by Australian ANCAP tests, though it fell well short of exemplary performance. The exterior was reworked, including the revamped front, a more angular rear and door mirrors creating a more dynamic upright and swept look of the era, a design later seen reflected by the Lexus ES350 and 2004 Mitsubishi Diamante.

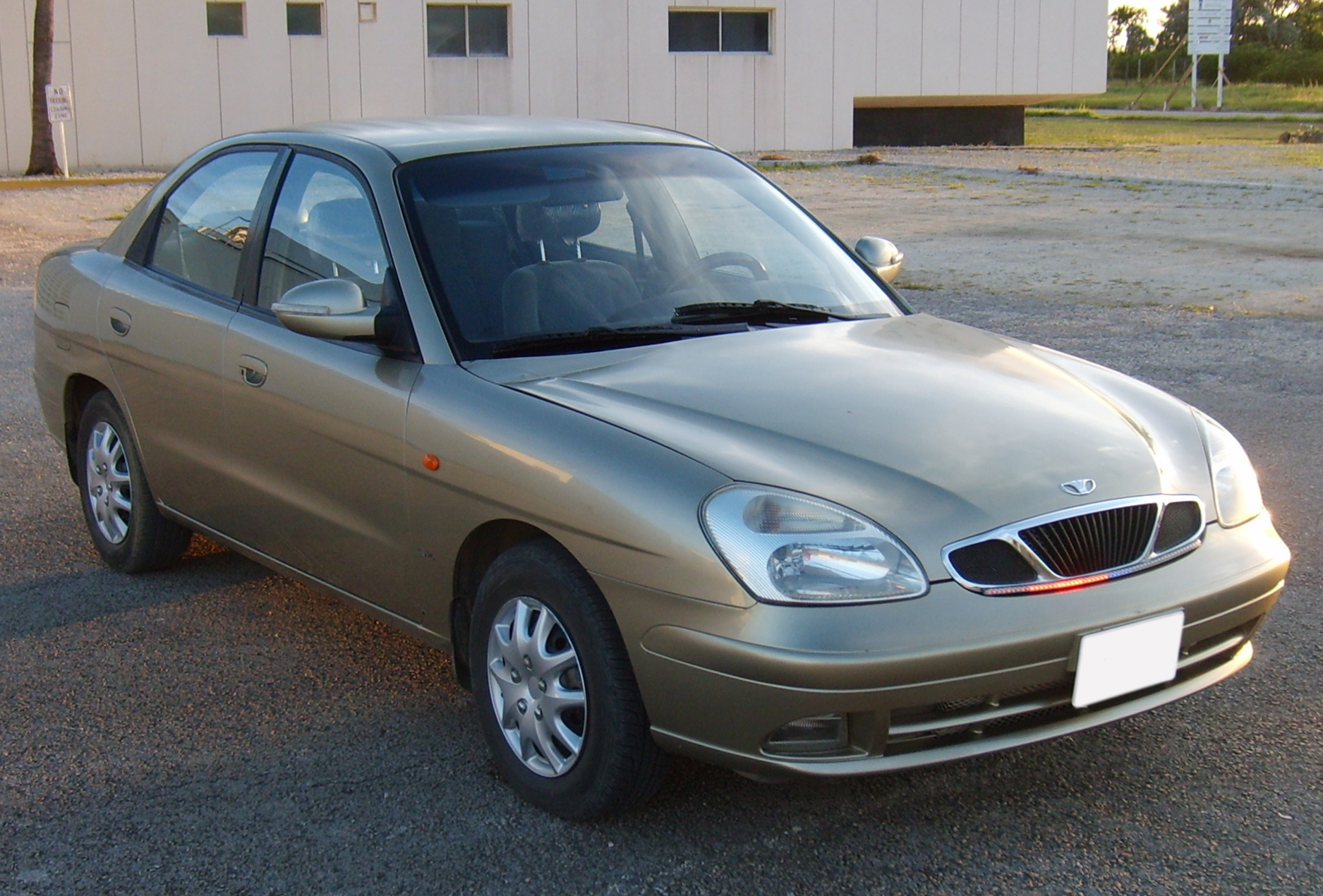
Daewoo Nubira sedan (facelift)

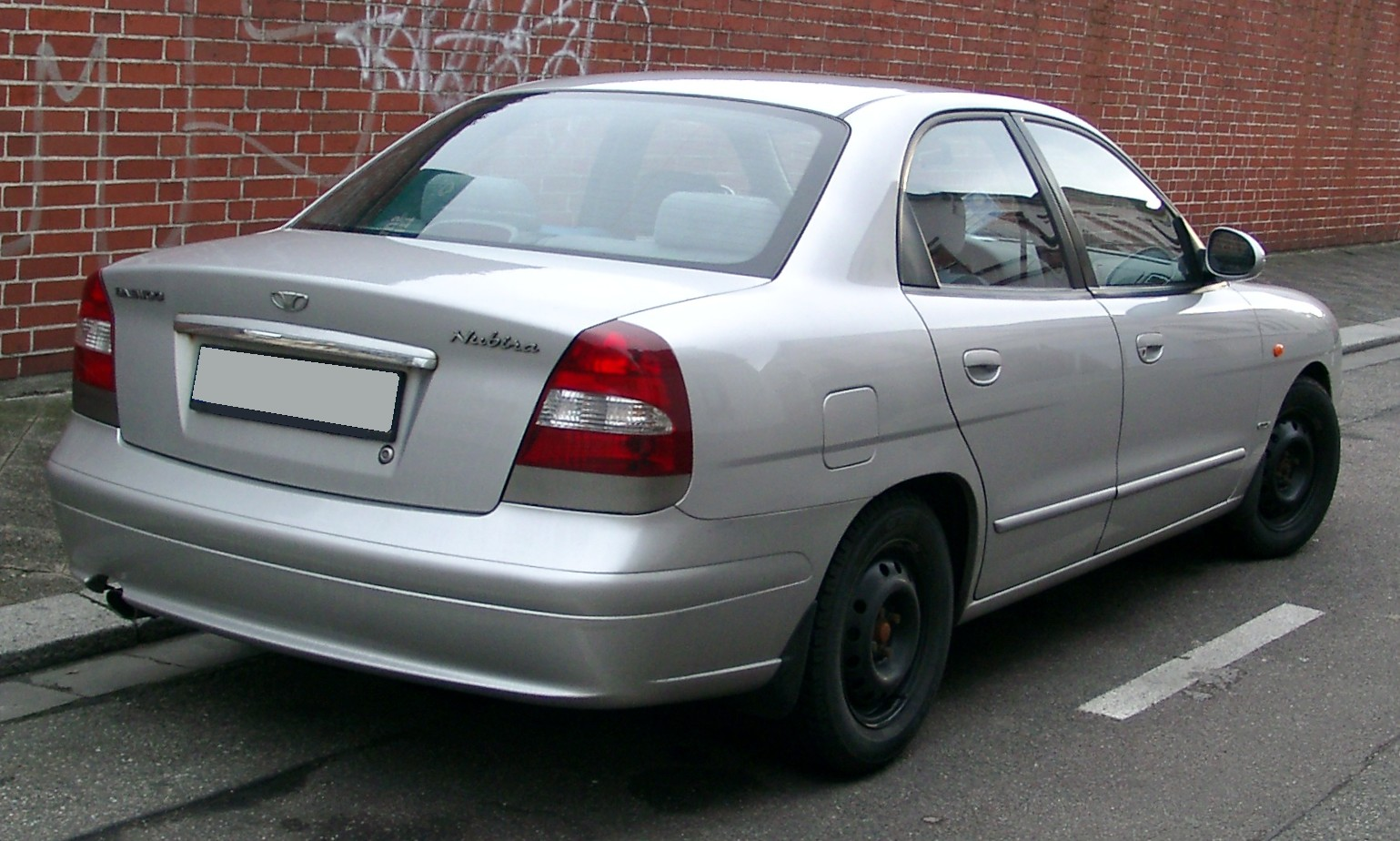
Daewoo Nubira sedan (facelift)

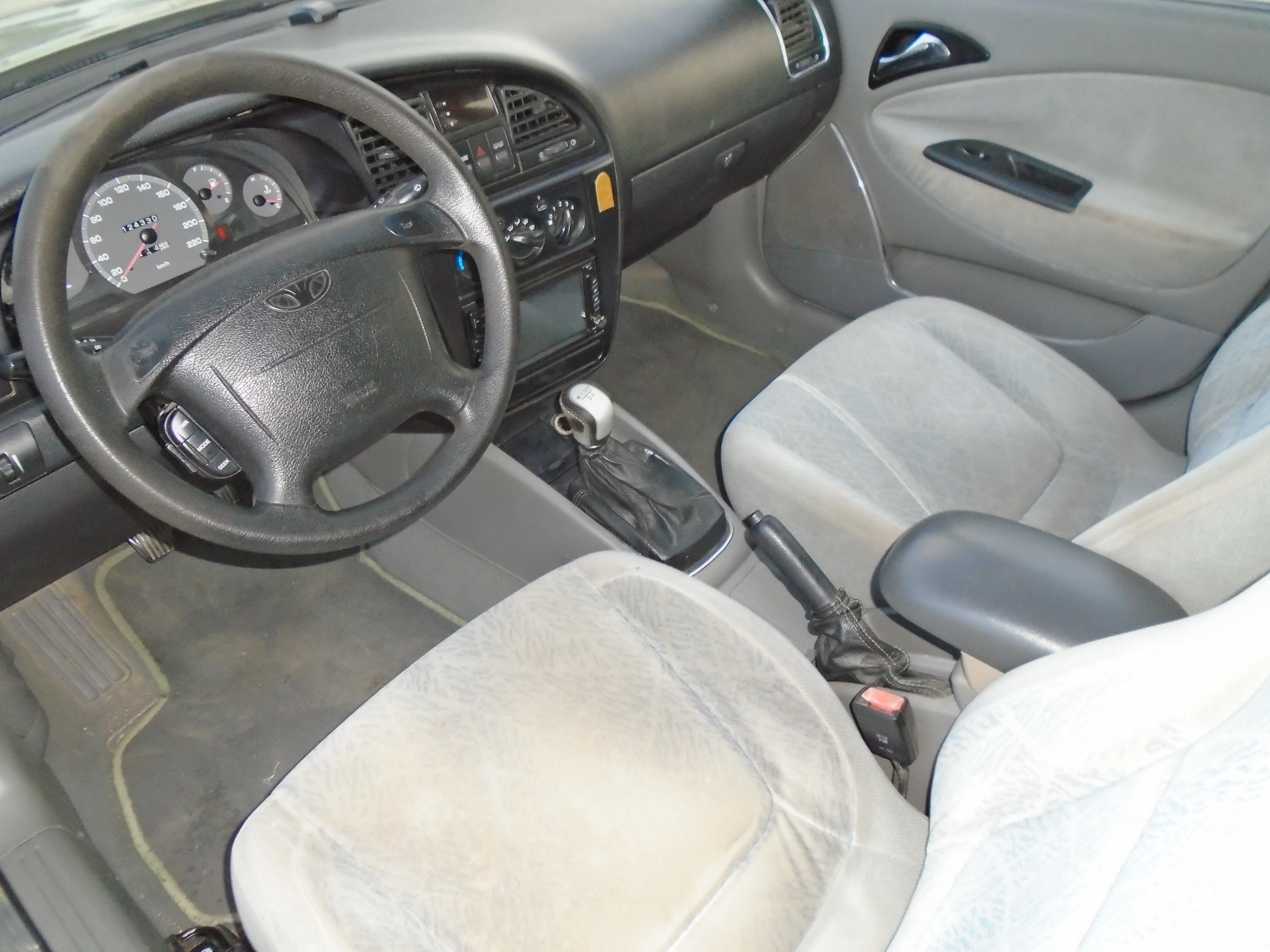
Daewoo Nubira (J150; facelift interior)

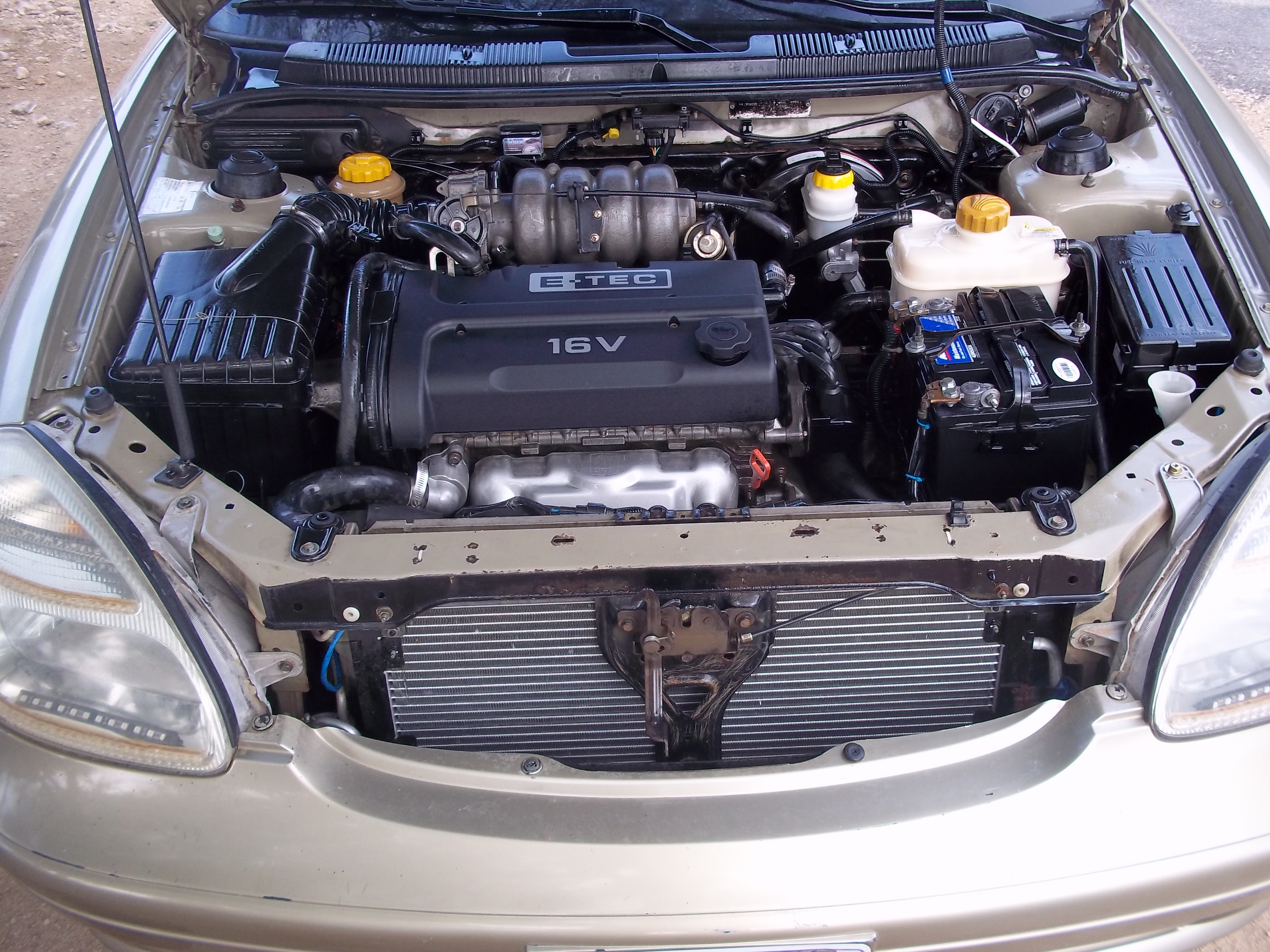
1.6L DOHC engine (A16DMS)

The Nubira was replaced in 2004 with the J200 Daewoo Lacetti, under GMDAT management with a new Pininfarina-designed body offered as a sedan, station wagon, and Italdesign hatchback. It was sold in some European markets as the Chevrolet Nubira and in the United States as the Suzuki Forenza and Reno.

== Marketing and production ==
In all European markets, production starts in 1997 and facelifts were done in 1999. International market Nubiras had a choice of a Daewoo "E-Tec" 1.3,"E-Tec" 1.6, or Holden 1.8 or 2.0-litre inline-four gasoline engines: no diesel version was ever offered, although the Worthing Technical Centre installed Renault's F8 1.9-litre engine in a small number of test vehicles, under a development programme known as J151.

=== United Kingdom ===
Daewoo announced that production of the Nubira would begin in Autumn 1997 along with the new Daewoo range (that is with the Lanos and Leganza).

At 9 September 1997, prices were confirmed for the Nubira to go to sale on 11 September 1997:

UK Nubira Prices in 1997
Trim level	Body Type	Price
SE	4-door	£11,995
SE	Estate	£12,995
CDX	4-door	£12,995
CDX	Estate	£13,995

The four-model range offered two engines which included the 1.6 and the 2.0. There were two equipment levels, SE and CDX and two body styles, a four-door saloon and a five-door estate. The five-door hatchback was not offered at all. All models had the following equipment: air-conditioning, ABS, driver and front passenger airbags, alarm, engine immobiliser, power steering, electric front windows, central locking, metallic paint and RDS radio/cassette players as standard. The only differences were that the SE had hubcaps, non-body coloured door handles and door mirrors and 'SE' emblems at the body wings. Alloy wheels were an option on the SE model. The CDX, meanwhile, came with alloy wheels, body-coloured door handles and wing mirrors, rear electric windows and 'CDX' emblems at the body wings. Then, promotions were extended to one years' free insurance for the new range from 1 January 1998.

New finance packaging were provided and the prices were cut by £425 for 1999. In 2001, prices were reduced another £1,230.

==== Reviewing ====
The AA first tested out the Nubira in August 1997. They claimed that the ride was subtle and the driving experience was decent. In conclusion, they said that its keen value for money and decent equipment makes it a good family car. However, for them it was just another family car, rather competent than trendsetting.

In November 1998, AA tested the 1.6 SE version of the Nubira Estate. The AA's verdict mentioned that it was sensibly competent rather than a crowd-drawing performer, it fitted a lot of motoring for the money and the aftersales package was outstanding, receiving an overall good review.

Finally, the facelift version of the Nubira was tested in July 1999. The AA liked its comfort (particularly the seats) yet some of the mechanical improvements weren't very good for them; for instance despite the new engine management system, they thought the new two litre engine still suffered a nasty 'shunt' as the accelerator was released and applied. The verdict was the facelift made it a more refined and comfortable car with the sublime aftersales peace-of-mind package.

==== Facelift (Nubira J150) ====
On 22 July 1999, the facelift of the Nubira was announced, barely after 24 months of its official release in the UK. Engines (1.6 and 2.0 litres) were revised too, including decreased torque and performance yet making it more economical.

Limited edition models included price reduction for the 1.6 SE 4-door (£9,995). The saving (on equivalent models) was £1,814. Extra equipment included 14" alloy wheels, metallic/mica paint and a CD autochanger free-of-charge. Also, Daewoo provided finance offers, which means more promotions and expanding it on the Nubira Estate. For the Nubira, offers included 0% Hire Purchase, 36 months, 40% deposit on CDX. In 2002, Daewoo provided a £1,500 cashback on the Nubira CDX.

==== Recalls ====
On 18 June 2001, Daewoo recalled 3,000 Nubira CDX's due to a fault in the fuel filter.

=== North American market ===
Production began in 2000. In the United States, the Nubira was marketed with Daewoo's smaller subcompact Lanos and midsize Leganza. Daewoo had a difficult time entering the US auto market due to financial trouble at home; with 2002 being the last model year available due to bankruptcy and a lack of new product. In North America, the cars are relatively obscure, if not rare, and sourcing parts for them became relatively difficult; though many powertrain parts were shared worldwide with other GM platforms (Opel, Holden, Isuzu).

Promotions were provided, including a peace-of-mind 3-year/36,000 mile comprehensive warranty, 3-year/24-hour priority assistance program and a 5 year/60,000 mile powertrain warranty. All with no extra charge. United States Nubira models came equipped only with an Australian-built (by Holden) DOHC 16-valve 2.0-liter inline-four General Motors "D-Tec" gasoline engine paired with either a Daewoo-designed D-20 five-speed manual transaxle or an optional, GM-sourced 4T40E automatic. Producing 136 lb⋅ft (184 N⋅m) torque at 4,400 rpm, the GM Family-II engine had a square 3.4" stroke and a 3.4" bore and at 5,400 rpm making 129 bhp (96 kW; 131 PS). Two trim levels were available, SE and CDX. All Nubiras were equipped with power-steering and an array of other standard equipment. CDX models got extra equipment, like air conditioning, cruise control, alarm with keyless entry, alloy wheels and a CD player.

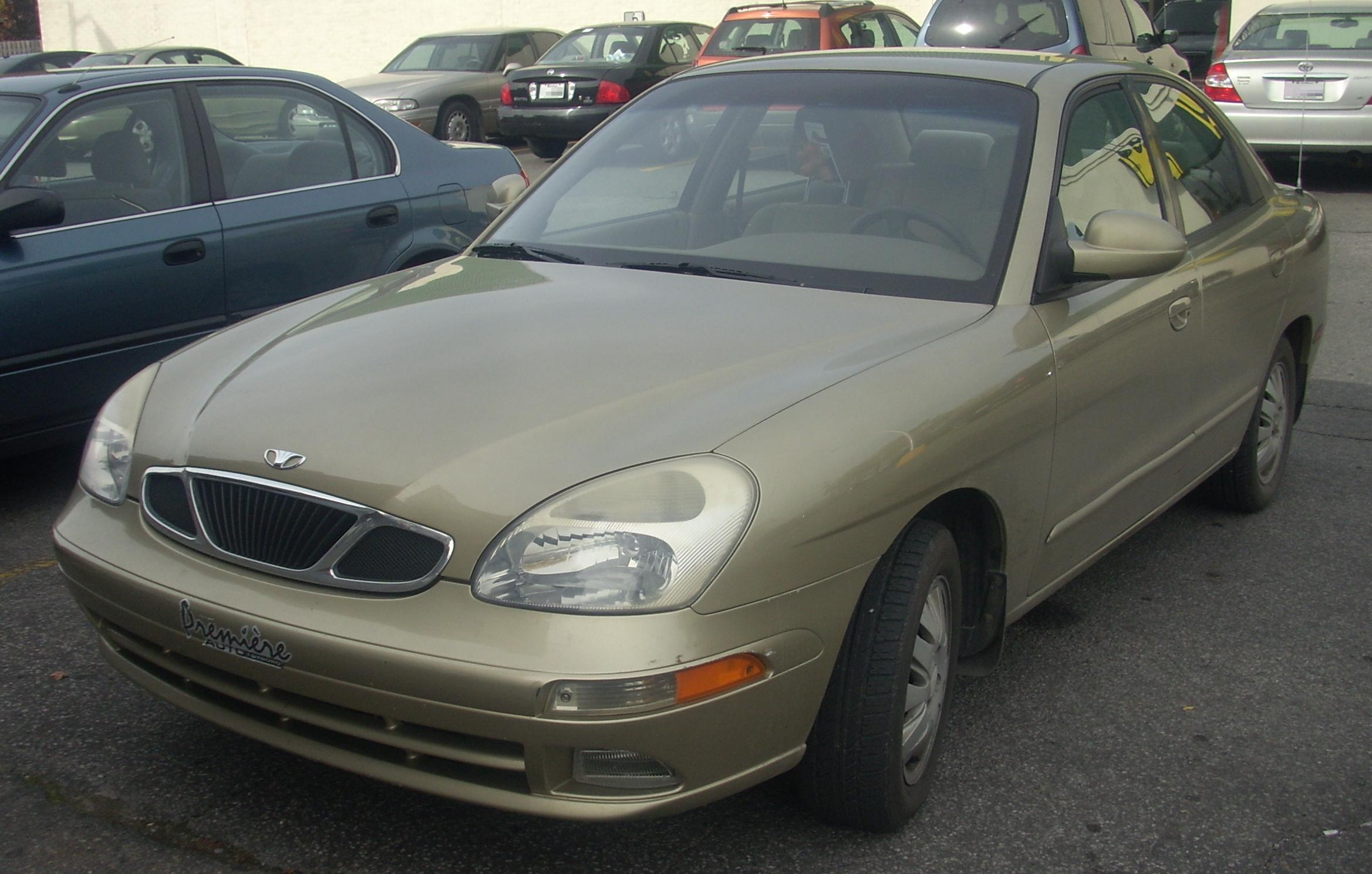
2000–2002 Daewoo Nubira (J150) sedan (Canada)

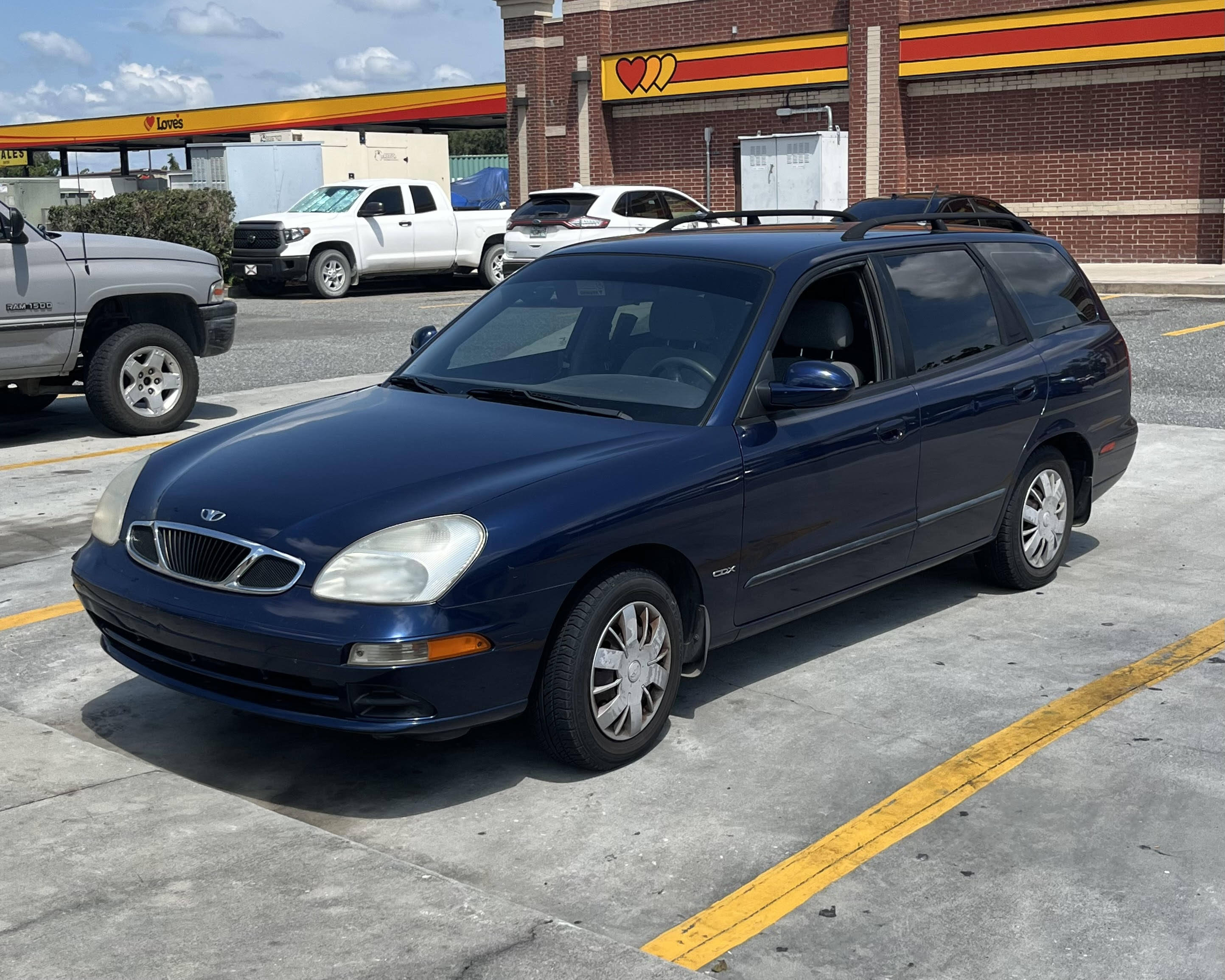
2000–2002 Daewoo Nubira (J150) wagon (US)

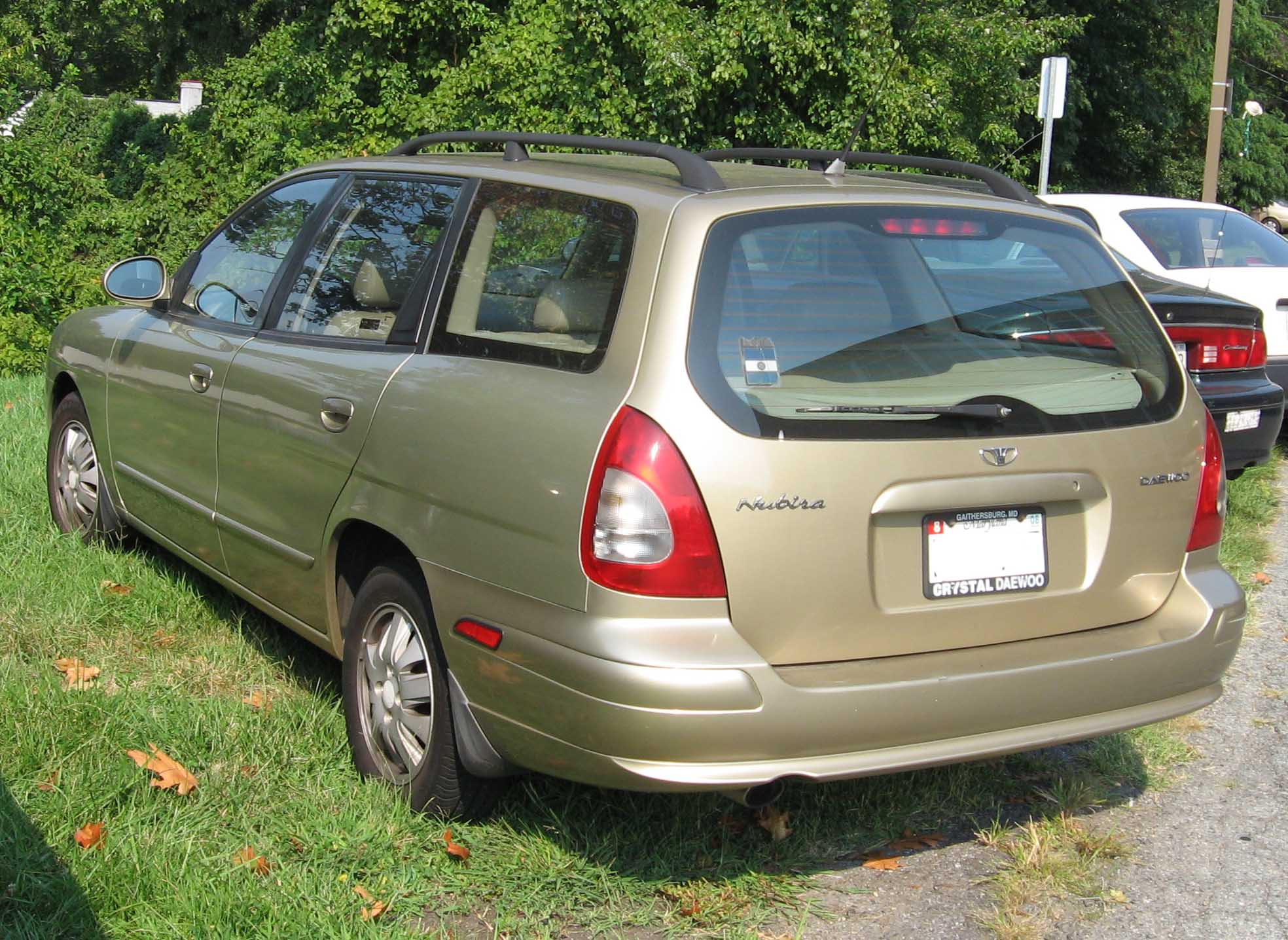
2000–2002 Daewoo Nubira (J150) wagon (US) rear view

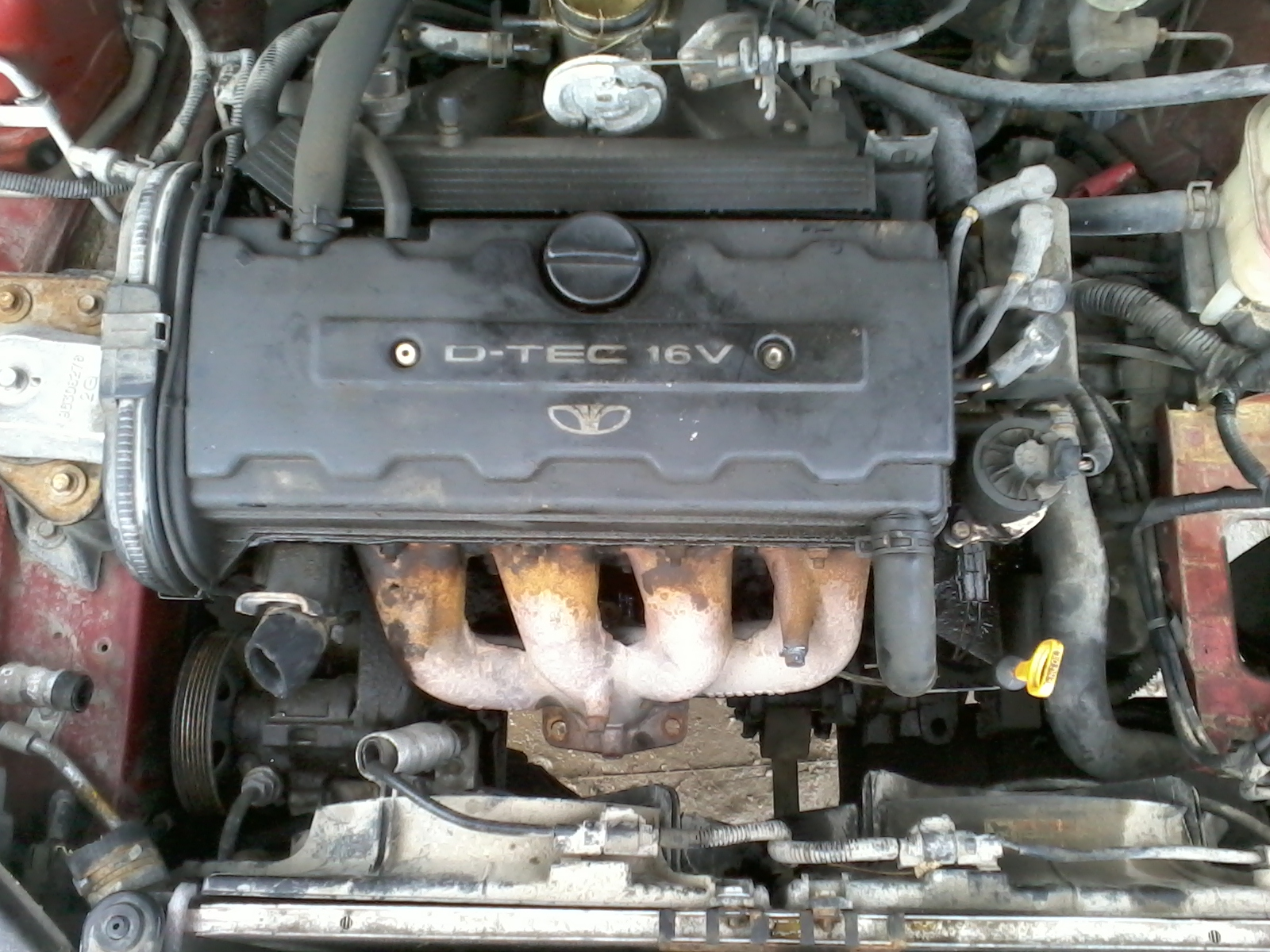
Daewoo Nubira 2.0L (DOHC) engine (US)

=== The Netherlands ===
In the Netherlands, there were three trim levels available, SE (base model), SX and CDX with three body types including the hatchback, saloon and estate. Prices varied depending on the model, starting from less than €15,000 for the base model saloon to less than €20,500 for the top-of-the-range estate. Prices were then varied for the facelift, which started from €15,395 for the base model hatchback all the way up to €21,095 for the top-of-the-range estate.

=== Russia, Romania & Egypt ===
The Nubira was also briefly produced from CKD kits on Taganrog, Russia TagAZ factory; it was marketed as the Doninvest Orion by the Russian automaker Doninvest. Until 2008, Daewoo Nubira was produced in Romania in a former Daewoo factory which had the licence from GM Daewoo. The Daewoo Nubira was still produced in Egypt in 2008, in a former Daewoo factory which has the licence from GM Daewoo.

Doninvest Orion 5-door hatchback

Doninvest Orion 4-door sedan (rear view)

== Second generation (J200; 2002) ==
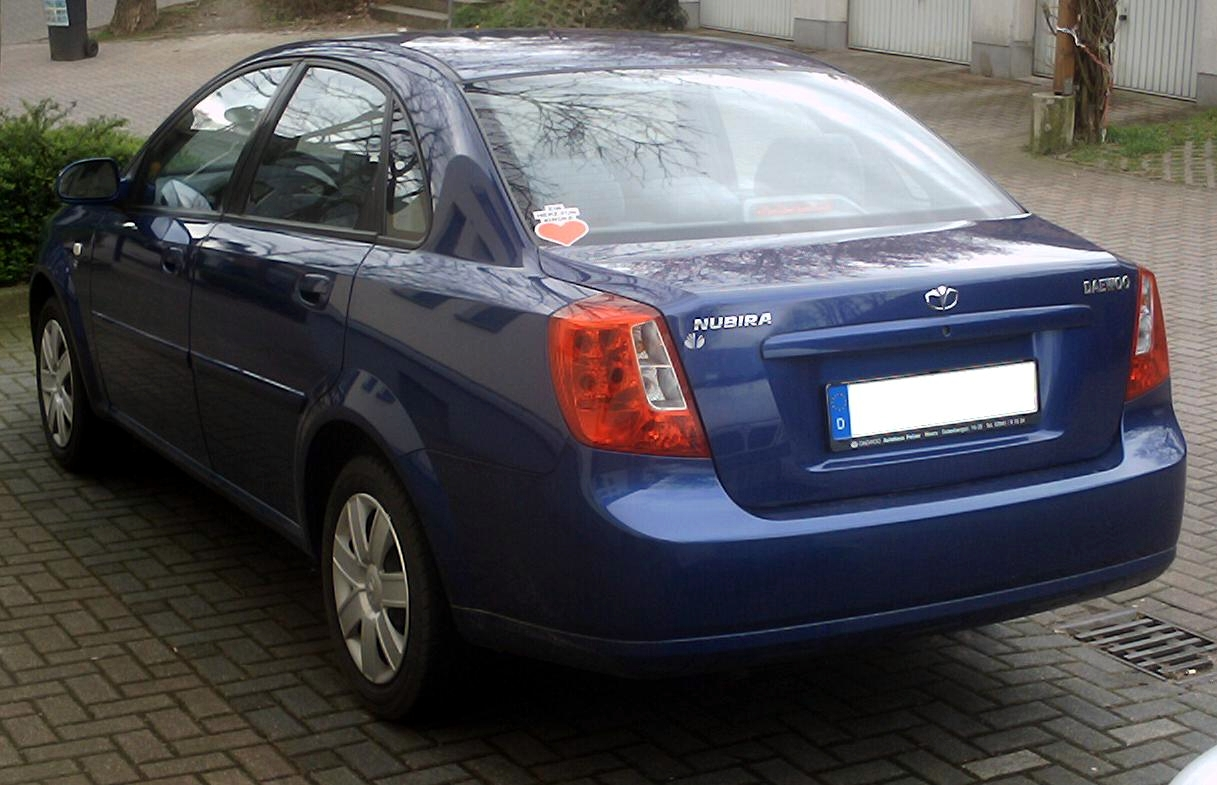
J200 Daewoo Nubira sedan (Europe)

In some Europeans markets, the Nubira nameplate was used on the sedan and station wagon body styles of the Daewoo Lacetti; changing to Chevrolet Nubira at the end of 2004.

== See also ==
- Daewoo Lacetti
