= Aksay, Russia =

Aksay (Russian: Аксай) is the name of several inhabited localities in Russia.

== Modern localities ==
Urban localities

- Aksay, Rostov Oblast, a town in Aksaysky District of Rostov Oblast

Rural localities

- Aksay, Republic of Dagestan, a selo in Khasavyurtovsky District of the Republic of Dagestan; 43°23′N 46°27′E
- Aksay, Lipetsk Oblast, a selo in Oktyabrsky Selsoviet of Usmansky District in Lipetsk Oblast; 52°15′N 39°43′E
- Aksay, Republic of Tatarstan, a settlement in Bugulminsky District of the Republic of Tatarstan
- Aksay, Volgograd Oblast, a selo in Aksaysky Selsoviet of Oktyabrsky District in Volgograd Oblast

== Alternative names ==
- Aksay, alternative name of Novogagatli, a selo in Khasavyurtovsky District of the Republic of Dagestan; 43°28′N 46°29′E
