= Novogagatli =

Novogagatli Новогагатли
- Selo
- Location within Republic of Dagestan Location within Russia
- Coordinates: 43°27′N 46°28′E
- Country: Russia
- Region: Republic of Dagestan
- District: Khasavyurtovsky District
- Time zone: UTC+3:00

Novogagatli (Russian: Новогагатли) is a rural locality (a selo) in Khasavyurtovsky District, Republic of Dagestan, Russia. 5,956 (2021 census); 4,314 (2002 census); 2,623 (1989 Soviet census). There are 72 streets.

== Geography ==
Novogagatli is located 35 km north of Khasavyurt (the district's administrative centre) by road. Novoselskoye is the nearest rural locality.
