= FSO Syrena =

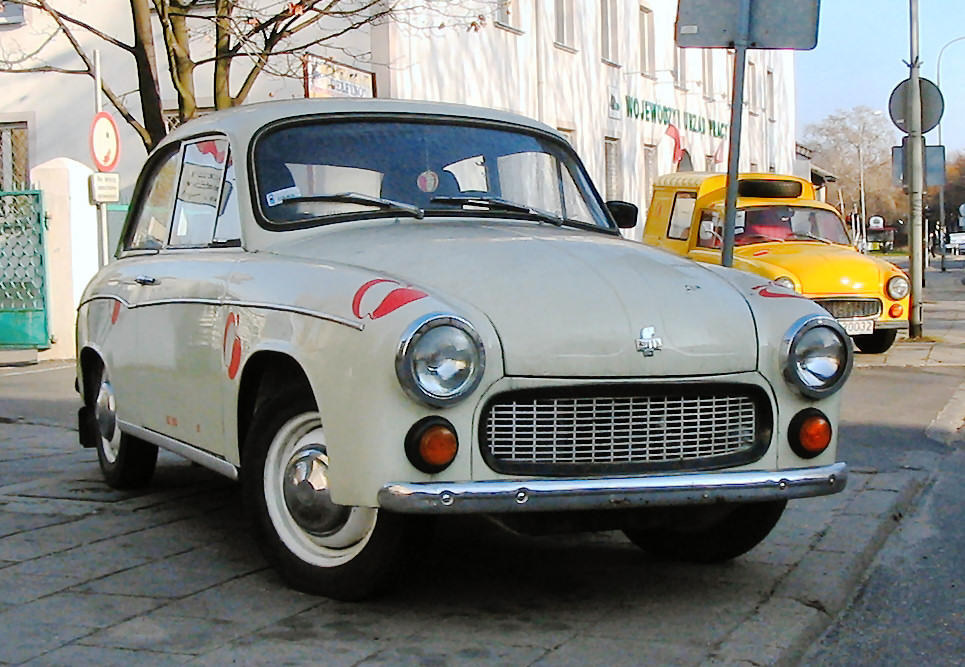
- FSM Syrena 105 and Syrena Bosto

Overview
- Manufacturer: FSO (1957–1972); FSM (1972–1983)
- Production: March 1957 – June 1983; 521,311 produced
- Assembly: Poland: Warsaw (FSO); Poland: Bielsko-Biała (FSM)

Body and chassis
- Body style: 2-door saloon; 2-door panel van (Bosto); 2-door pickup truck (R20)
- Layout: FF layout

Powertrain
- Engine: 746 cc two-stroke I2 (1956–1966); 842 cc two-stroke I3 (1966–1983)
- Transmission: 4-speed manual

Dimensions
- Wheelbase: 2,300 mm (90.6 in)
- Length: 4,030 mm (158.7 in); 4,080 mm (160.6 in)
- Width: 1,530 mm (60.2 in)
- Height: 1,520 mm (59.8 in)
- Curb weight: 950 kg (2,094.4 lb)

The FSO Syrena is a Polish automobile model first exhibited at the Poznań Trade Fair in 1955 and manufactured from 1957 to 1972 by the Fabryka Samochodów Osobowych (FSO) in Warsaw and from 1972 until 1983 by Fabryka Samochodów Małolitrażowych in Bielsko-Biała. 177,234 were manufactured by FSO and 344,077 by FSM, a total of 521,311. During its remarkably long production run it underwent only minor modifications.

The Syrena was produced in various models: 100, 101, 102, 103, 104, while the most popular model was the 105. All were two-door sedans with two-stroke engines, initially of two cylinders. In 1965 the Syrena received a larger three-cylinder engine.

From 1968 a prototype model named laminat was produced. A van called Bosto and a pick-up called the R20 were also produced. A coupé Syrena Sport and a hatchback Syrena 110 (in 1966) remained prototypes only.

A Siren is a mermaid who, according to the legend, protects the river Vistula and the Polish capital city, Warsaw. She is featured on the city's coat of arms. Also a diminutive name Syrenka (little siren) is commonly used for the car in Poland.

== History ==
At first, Polish engineers wanted Syrena to have a four-stroke air-cooled engine and a self-supporting chassis. But due to a lack of deep-drawn metal parts and cost reductions, the first Syrena 100 cars were supposed to have a wooden bodywork covered with leather-like material. The cars were powered by 2-stroke engines designed by engineer Fryderyk Bluemke. The first two prototypes of Syrena were made in December 1953. One – with a wooden framework, was constructed by Stanisław Panczakiewicz, while the second, steel-bodied car was made by Stanisław Łukaszewicz. They met halfway by combining the first car's design with the steel bodywork of the second one (with one exception – the roof remained wooden). By March 1955 FSO had built 5 prototypes of Syrena 100.

In September all of the prototypes took part in an experimental rally covering a distance of 5600 km. One of the cars, driven by Karol Pionnier, crashed, revealing the weak structure of the roof. As a result, the engineers decided to use steel instead of wood for this part of the car. One of the prototypes was exhibited at the Poznań Trade Fair in autumn 1955. On 20 March 1957 the mass production of Syrena 100 started.

=== FSO Syrena 100 ===
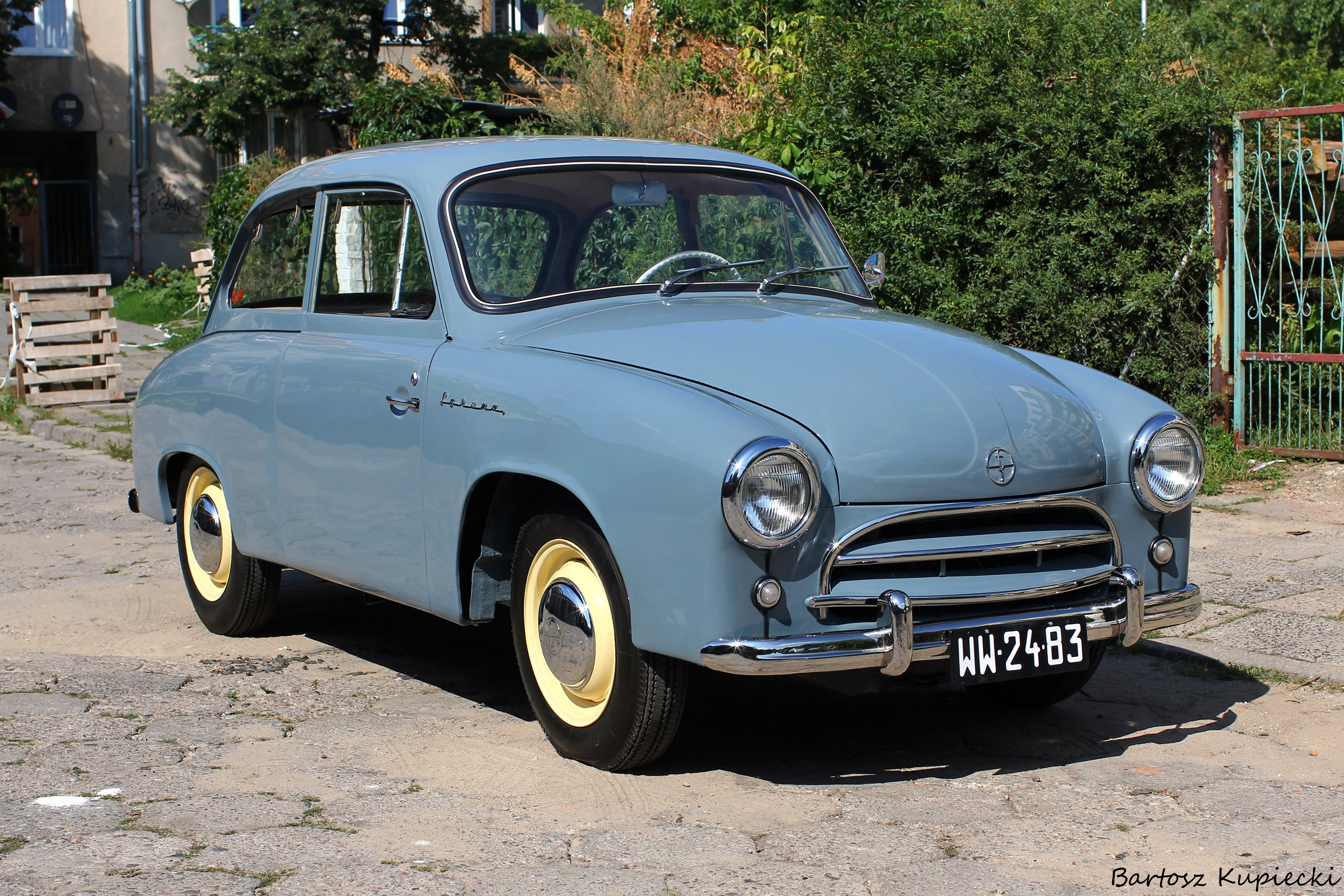
FSO Syrena 100

Syrena 100 was designed by engineers Stanislaw Lukasiewicz, Stanisław Panczakiewicz and Fryderyk Bluemke. The chassis and running gear was copied from the DKW. It was introduced to the public in June 1955 at the 24th Poznań Trade Fair. The car aroused much interest, which prompted the government to put it into production. At first, the production rate was to be 10,000 cars a year. Because of financial reasons, Syrena 100 and the much larger Warszawa automobile shared many parts. As a result, the Syrena was much heavier than intended (950 kg).

=== FSO Syrena 101 ===
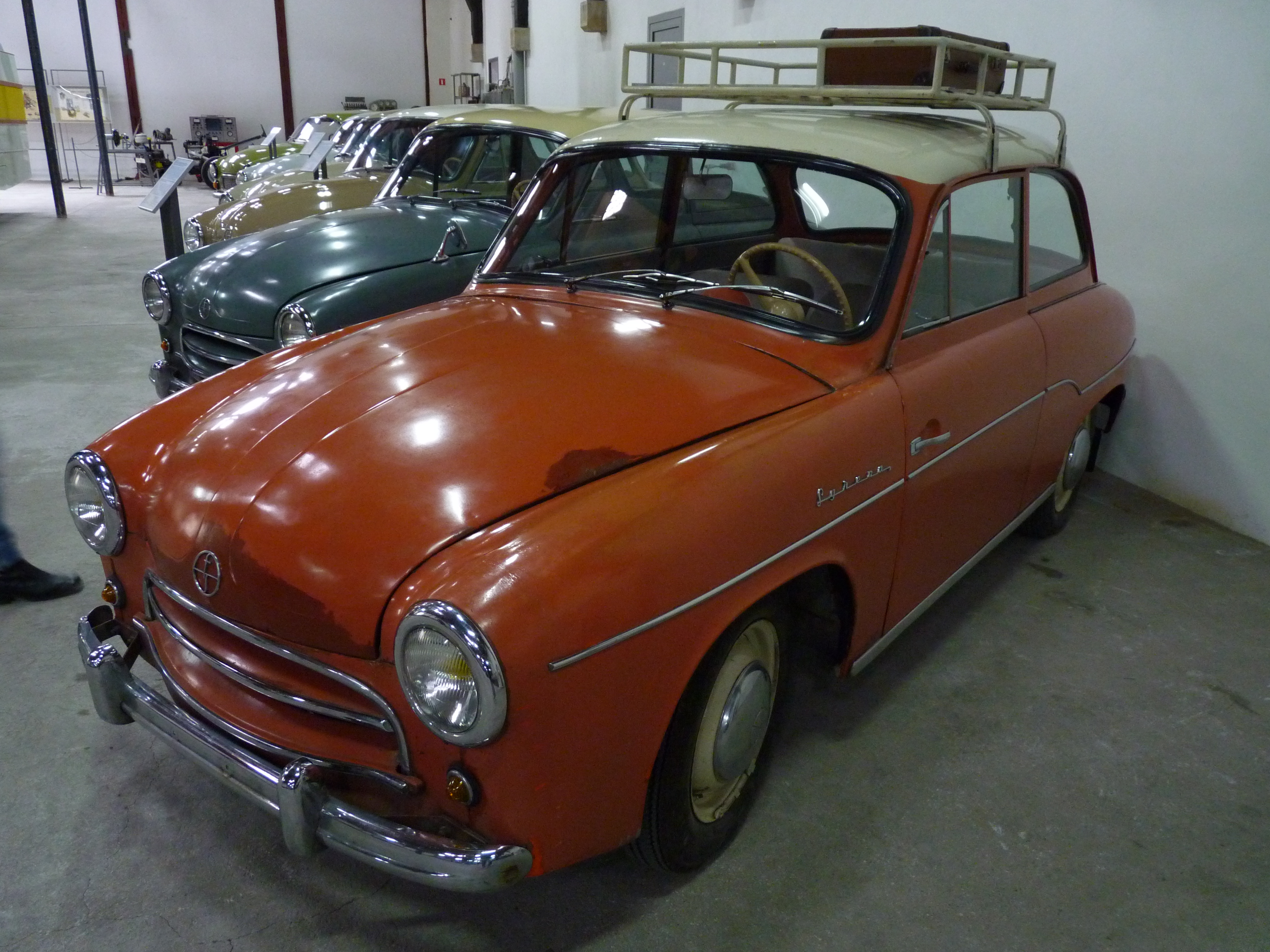
FSO Syrena 101

In 1960 Syrena underwent a first, minor modernisation. The improved car had a pneumatic fuel pump and a different type of carburetor. It also received new twin windscreen wipers and a better suspension.

=== FSO Syrena 102 ===
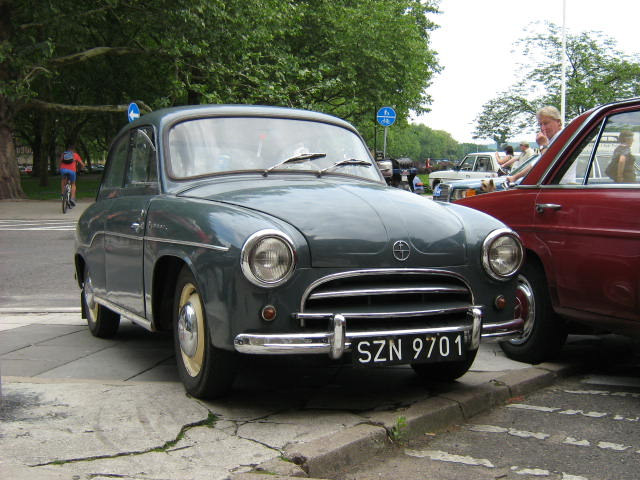
FSO Syrena 102

The Syrena 102, produced in 1962 and 1963, had slightly different body details. The "S" version of this model shared an engine with Wartburg 312. Around 150 examples of Syrena 102 S were produced.

=== FSO Syrena 103 ===
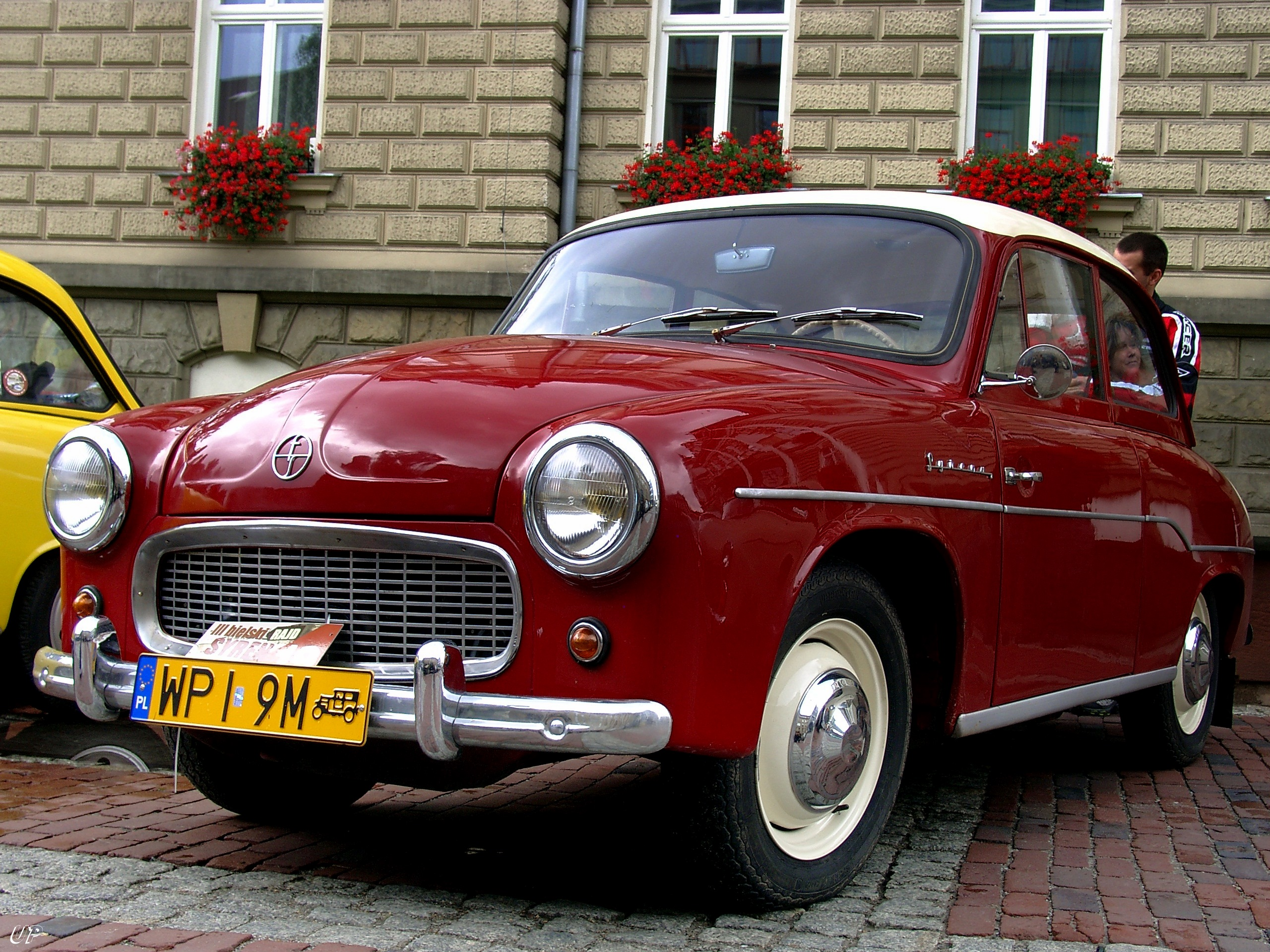
FSO Syrena 103 - original painting

Syrena 103 (1963–1966) had a restyled front and a different engine.

=== FSO Syrena 104 ===
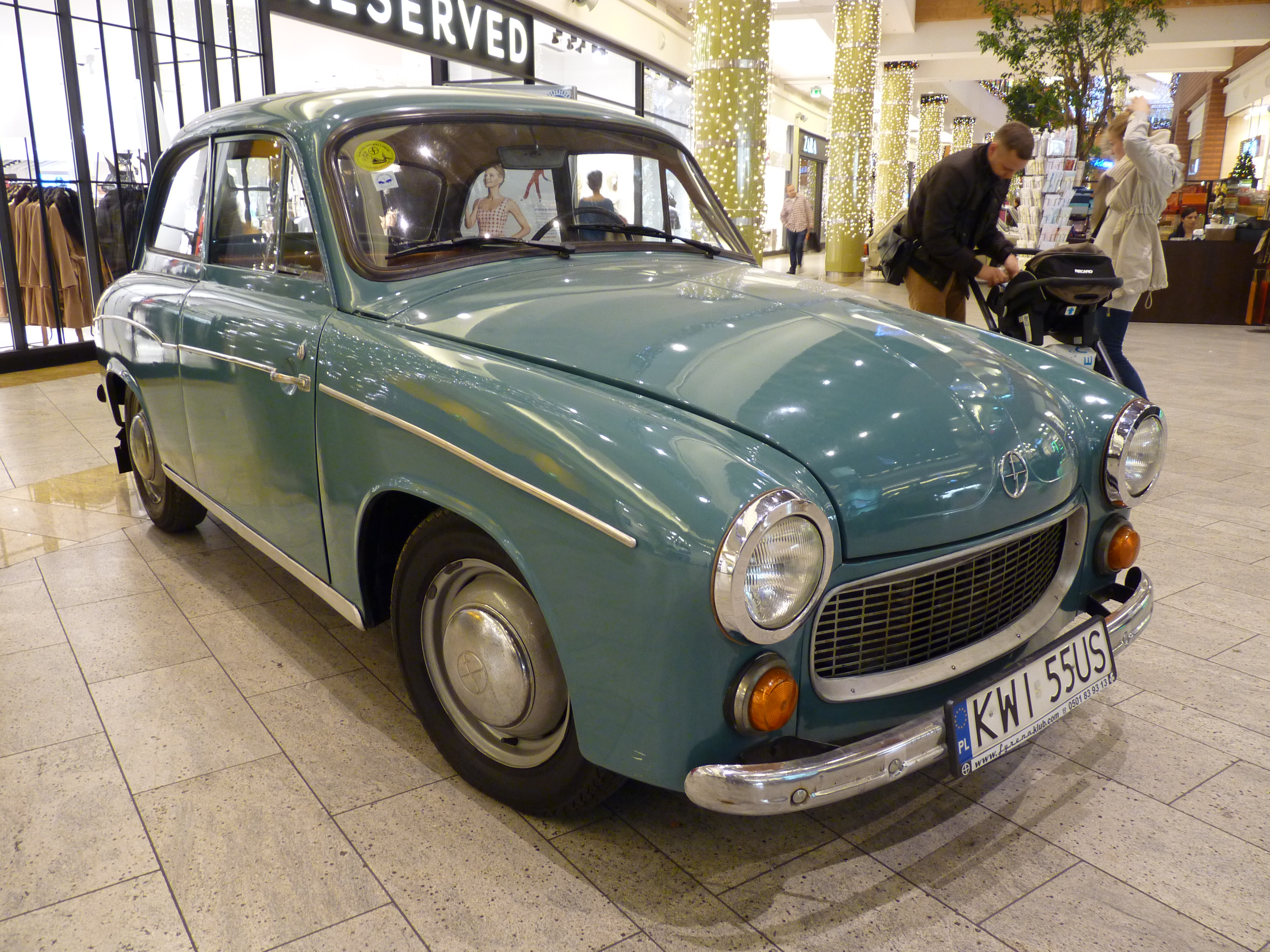
FSO Syrena 104

The next model lasted from 1966 to 1972. It had a new, three-cylinder engine, a synchronized gearbox and restyled tail lights.

=== FSM Syrena 105 ===
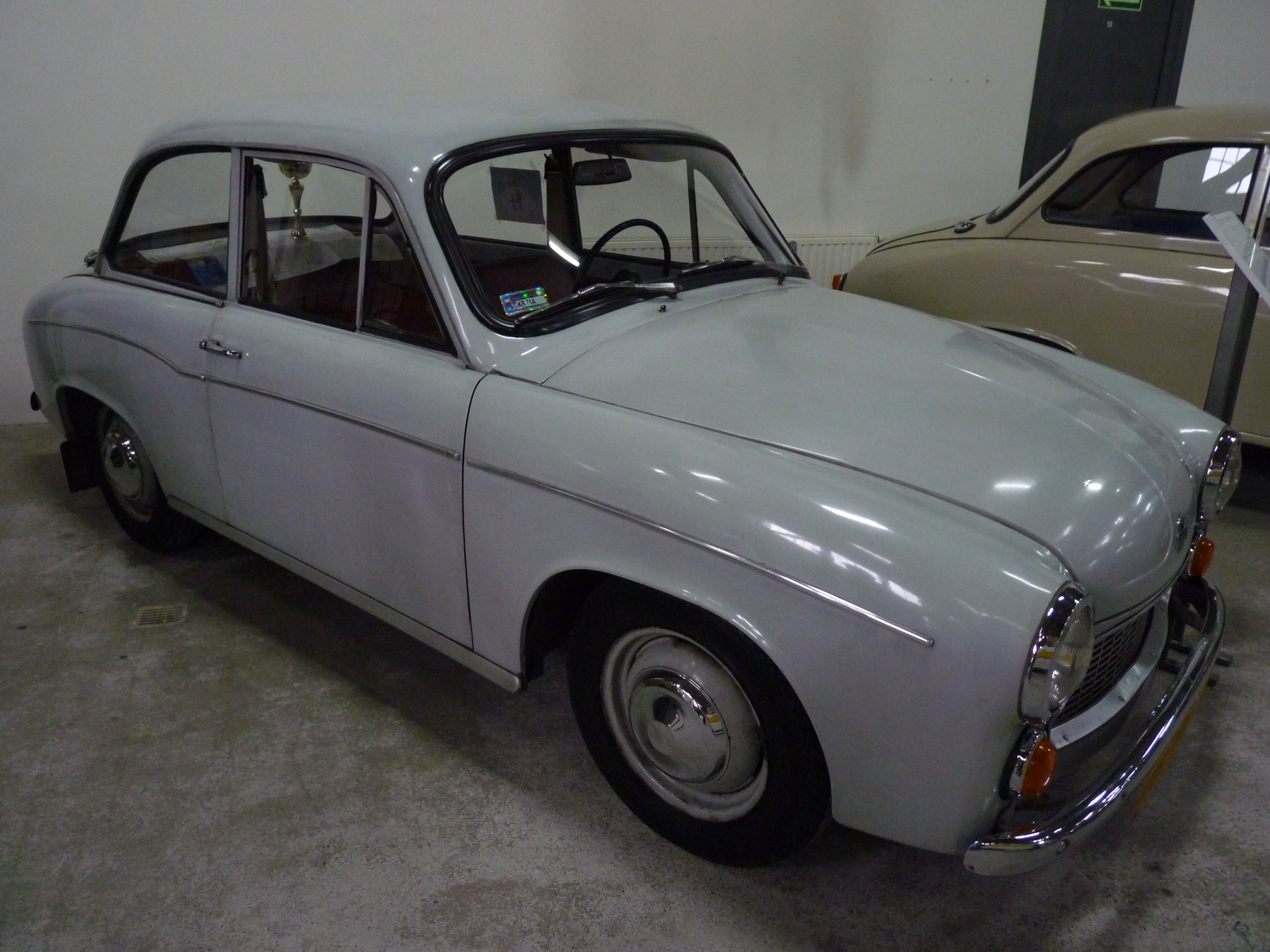
FSM Syrena 105

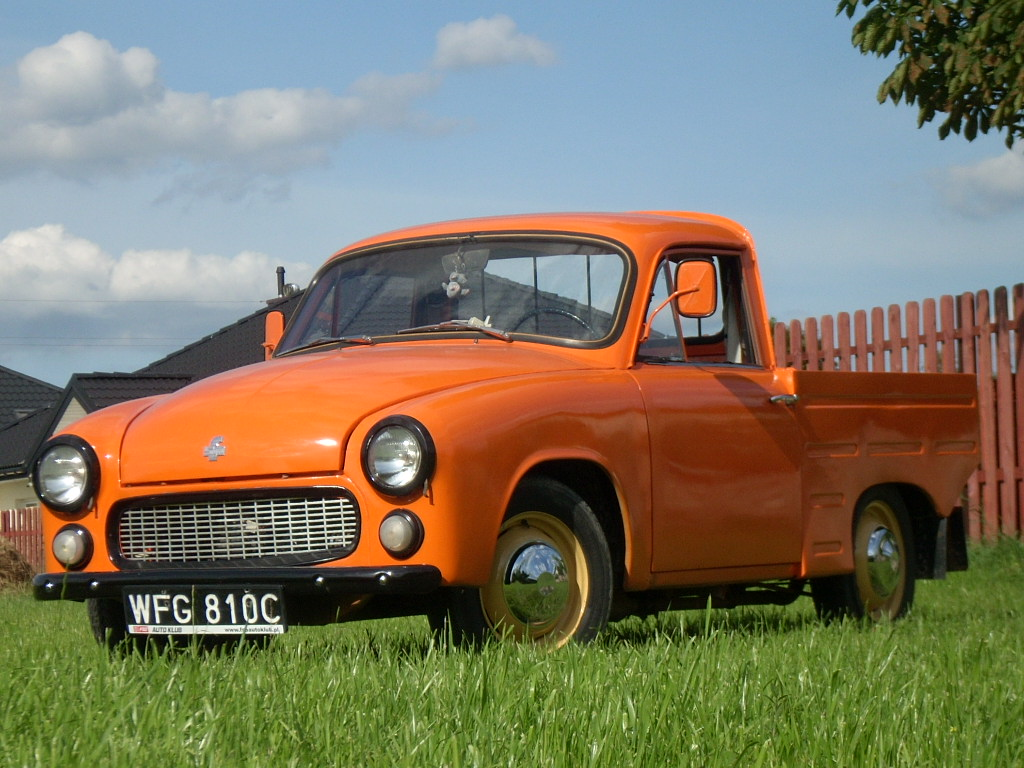
FSM Syrena R-20

The 105 was the last Syrena design. It was produced from 1972 to 1983 by the FSM factory and was badged accordingly. Unlike its predecessors it had regular front doors instead of "suicide" ones. The "Lux" version, produced from 1974, had the gear lever and handbrake between the front seats. The 105 served as a basis for two other models – Syrena R-20, which was a pick-up and a van – Bosto.

A 1983 FSM Syrena 105 L finished in yellow was featured in series 10 episode 10 of the British television programme Wheeler Dealers. Presenter Mike Brewer purchased the car in Poland for zł7,000 (the equivalent of £1,400) and drove it back to the show's UK-based workshop where it underwent repairs and upgrades by mechanic Edd China. The colour was changed to red and white in homage to the Polish flag. Other work included upgrades to the steering box, refurbishing the drum brakes, replacing the dynamo with an alternator and replacing the radio. The total cost of procuring and upgrading the car reached £5,454. The completed car was driven to the Polish embassy where ambassador Witold Sobków took a ride with them. The car was later sold for £8,000 to the bubble car museum in Lincolnshire.

== FSM Syrena Bosto ==
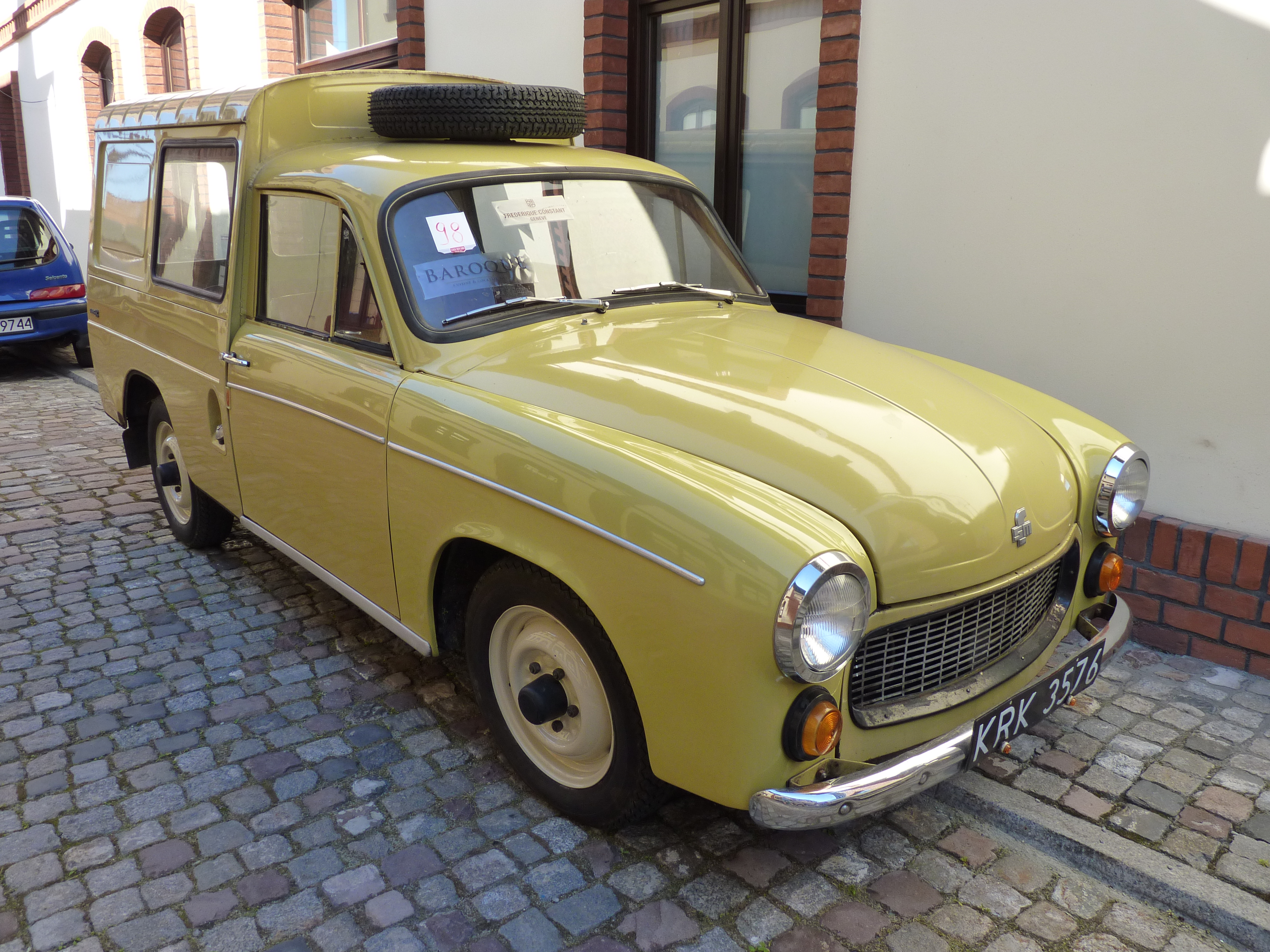
FSM Syrena Bosto

The Syrena Bosto panel van and its pickup truck sister, the Syrena R-20, were first introduced to the 104 models of the Syrena. The name is an acronym of Bielski Osobowo-Towarowy, or "Passenger-Cargo [car] of Bielsko." The first model of the Bosto was revealed in December 1971, at the newly constructed FSM factory in Bielsko-Biała in southern Poland. The final model finished production 30 April 1983. Overall, approximately 135,000 Bostos were built.

The Bosto 104B started official production in 1972, and was available as a four-seater van, capable of carrying 200 kg of freight, or as a two-seater cab with a 350 kg load rating. The second edition, Syrena Bosto 105B, replaced the 104 in 1976. Essentially the same vehicle stylistically, the differences were in construction. Uprated semi-elliptical springs from the FSO Warszawa, an increased fuel tank borrowed from the FSO 125p, and the handbrake moved to the "standard" position between the front seats were the main modifications. As with the Syrena saloon the 3-cylinder, 2-stroke engine was mounted longitudinally in front of the front axle and powered the front wheels through a gearbox with driveshafts coming sideways out of it.

The driver's compartment was separated from the rear load space by a single sheet bulkhead, and additional roof-fixed netting. Because the Bosto was designed for heavy loads, as opposed to the sedan version of the Syrena, the suspension underneath was modified. An extended chassis held a rear trailing axle on leaf suspension, each with a hydraulic suspension damper. This allowed a lower floor level, and in turn allowed FSM to borrow directly parts from the Zuk A05/A06.

=== Dimensions ===
Weight: 950 kg Wheelbase: 2300mm Length: 39650mm Rear Compartment: H-1600 mm x W-1470 mm

== FSO Syrena Sport ==
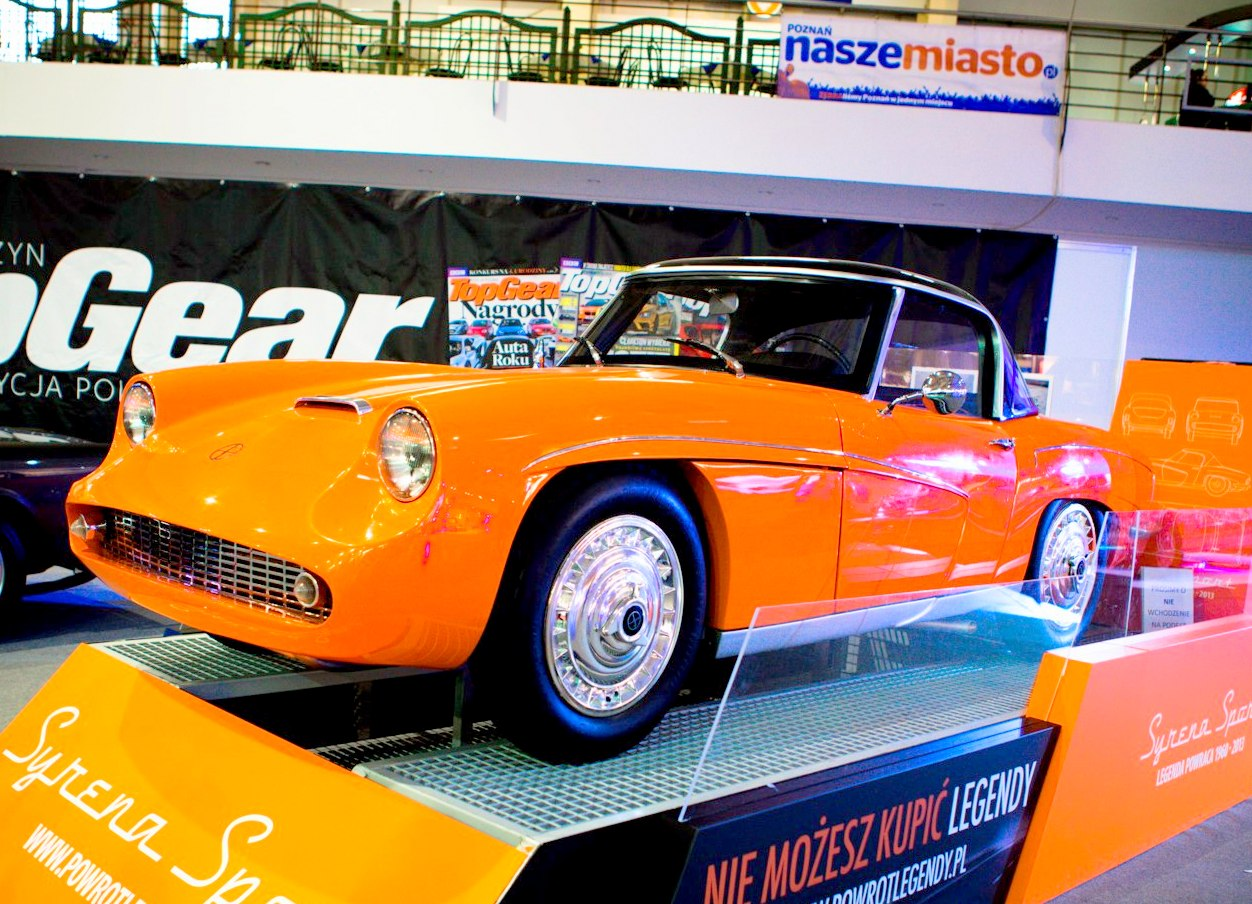
FSO Syrena Sport replica

In 1960 a prototype Syrena Sport was produced with a fibreglass body and a four-stroke two-cylinder engine. However, this model was not put into production.

== See also ==
- AMZ Syrenka (2014)
- List of Eastern European cars
