= FSO Warszawa =

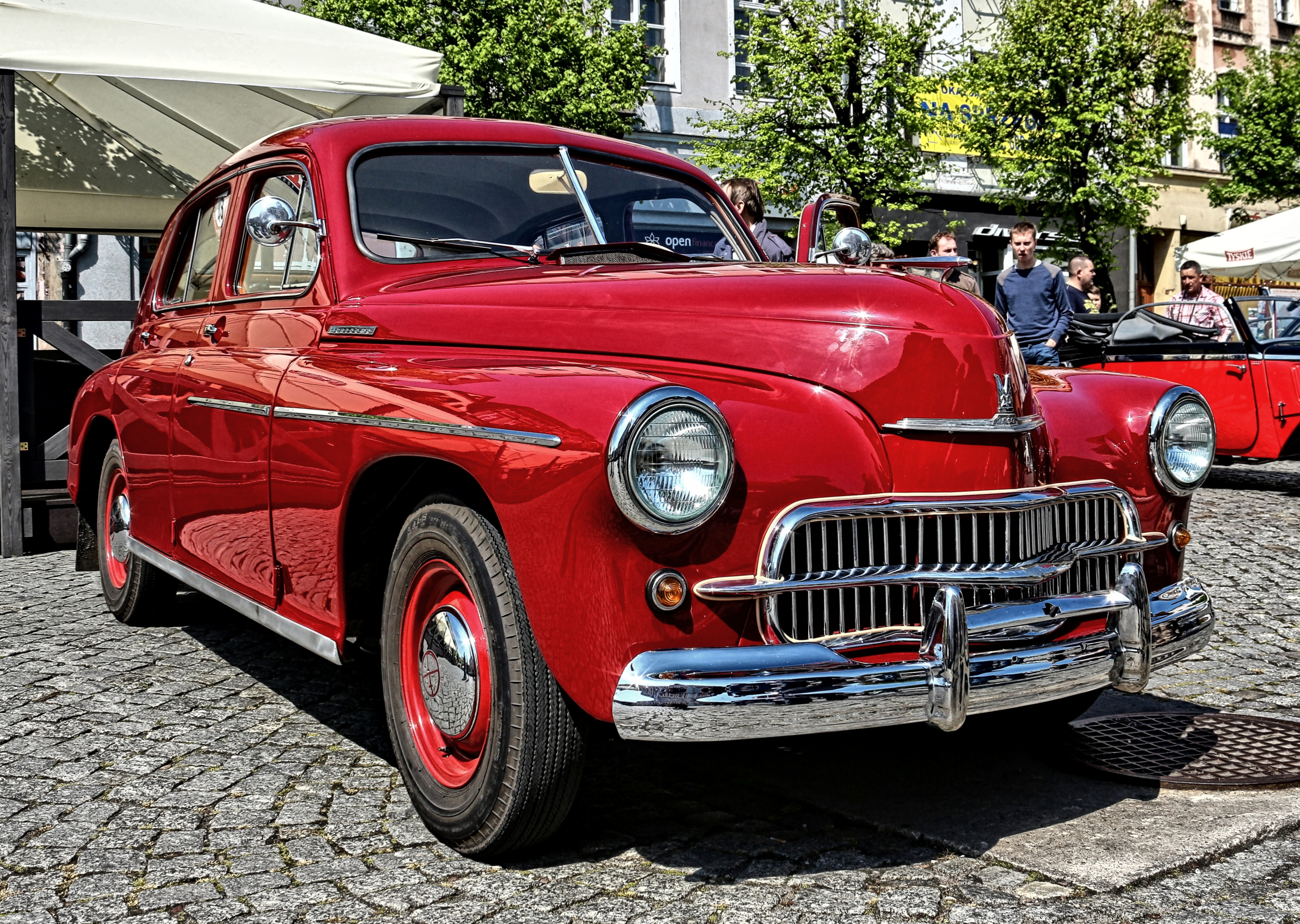
- FSO Warszawa M20 (facelift)

Overview
- Manufacturer: FSO
- Production: November 1951 – March 1973
- Assembly: Poland: Warsaw

Body and chassis
- Class: D/E
- Body style: 4-door fastback; 4-door saloon; 5-door estate; 2-door pickup
- Related: GAZ-M20 Pobeda; FSR Tarpan; FSC Żuk; ZSD Nysa

Powertrain
- Engine: 2.1 L M-20 SV I4; 2.1 L S-21 OHV I4
- Transmission: 3-speed manual 4-speed manual (1970–1973)

Dimensions
- Wheelbase: 2,700 mm (106.3 in)
- Length: 4,665 mm (183.7 in) (fastback and pickup); 4,740 mm (186.6 in) (sedan); 4,750 mm (187.0 in) (estate)
- Width: 1,695 mm (66.7 in); 1,710 mm (67.3 in) (pickup)
- Height: 1,640 mm (64.6 in) (fastback); 1,620 mm (63.8 in) (sedan); 1,705 mm (67.1 in) (estate); 1,905 mm (75.0 in) (pickup)
- Curb weight: from 1,360 kg (2,998 lb)

Chronology
- Successor: Polski Fiat 125p

The FSO Warszawa (from Polish: Warsaw) is an automobile manufactured by FSO factory in Warsaw, Poland between 1951 and 1973, based on GAZ-M20 Pobeda.

The Warszawa was the first newly designed car built in Poland after World War II. Warszawas were popular as taxis because of their sturdiness and ruggedness. However, they were underpowered for their weight and had high fuel consumption. In total, 254,471 cars were made.

== Description ==
=== M20 model ===
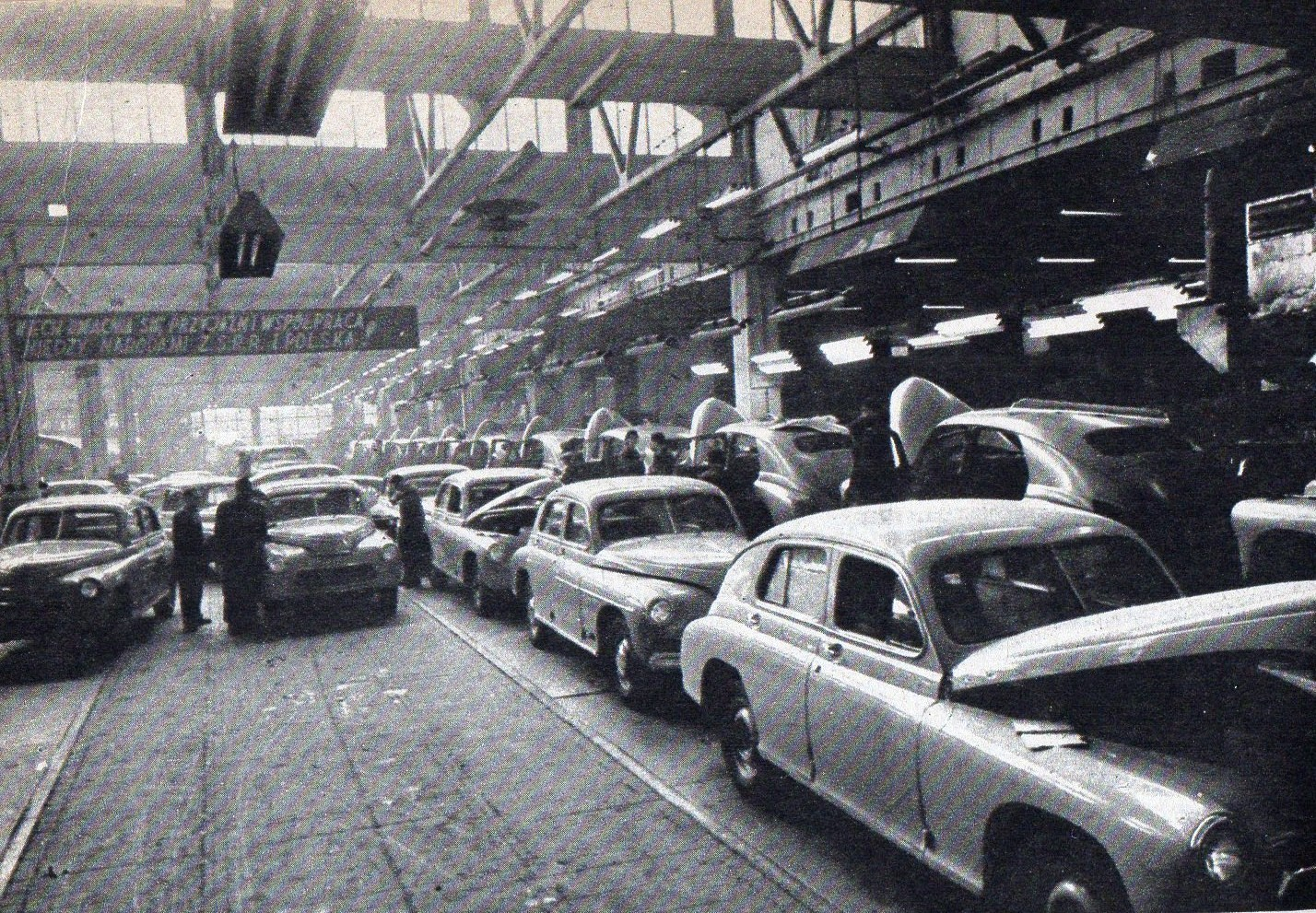
The FSO Warszawa M20 assembly line.

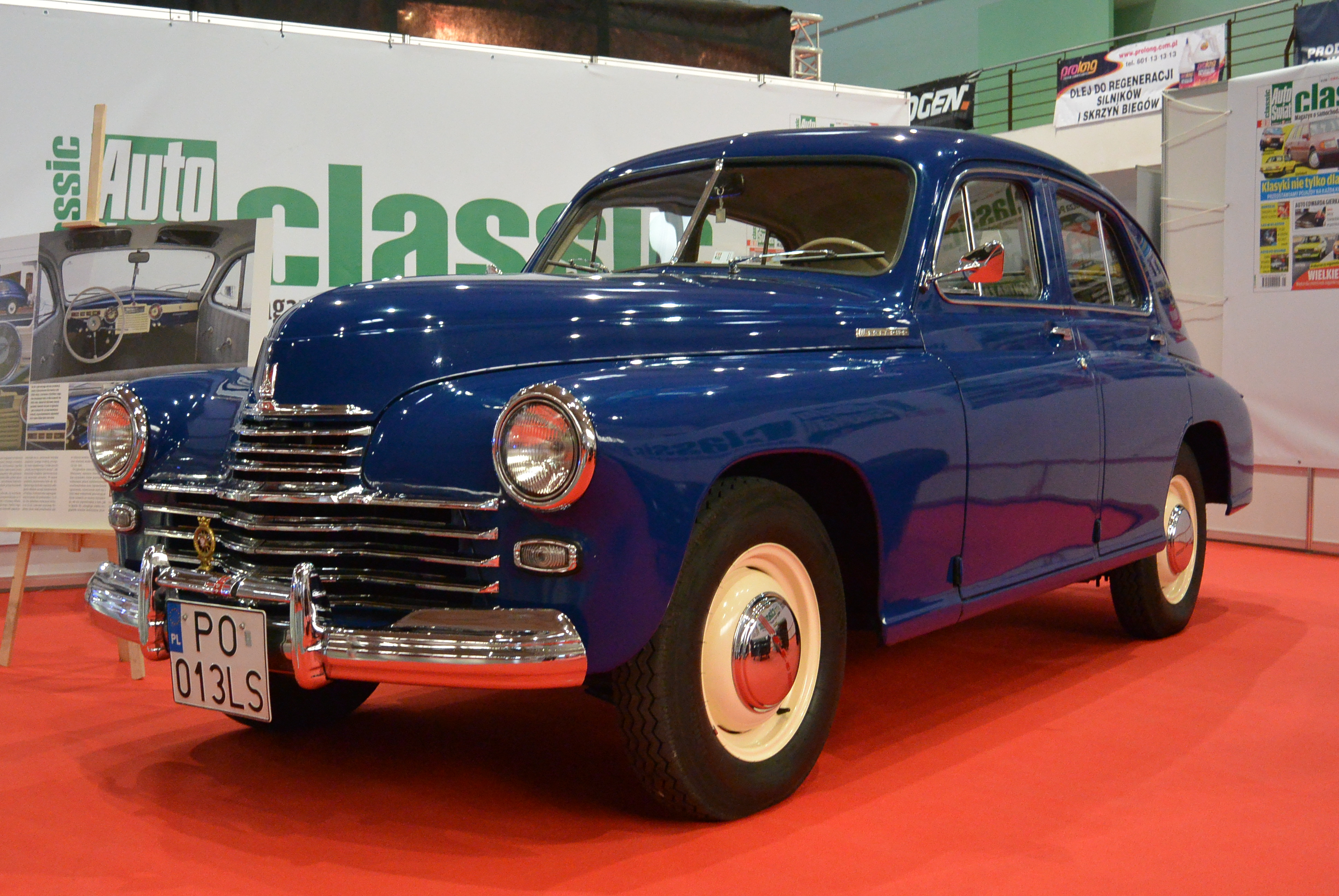
FSO Warszawa M20 (pre-facelift)

Named after Poland's capital city Warsaw, the Warszawa was until 1957 identical to the Soviet Pobeda, built under license, which was given to Poland by GAZ at Joseph Stalin's insistence. The engine was the same, side-valve M-20 unit of 2.1 L (2,120 cc) as used in the Pobeda, producing 50 hp (37 kW). Exports of the car started in 1954 to countries such as Romania, China, Bulgaria and Albania. In 1956 work began on the development of a new four-speed gearbox. However, it failed in practice and its development was suspended. In the same year, work began on an overhead valve engine that could be used to drive the car. This engine was a copy of the Étendard engine used on the Renault Frégate, and started being put on Warszawa models in 1962. The first major modernization took place in 1957. The new model was called FSO Warszawa M20 model 57, but not long after its name was changed to Warszawa 200. The new model received a restyled front-end section. The powertrain was modified too, the compression ratio was raised from 6.2:1 to 6.8:1 and maximum power crept up to 52 hp (38 kW).

=== 201/202 models ===
In 1960, a lightly modernized version of the 200 was introduced, called the 201. This model received 200 technical improvements, including rear combination lights, engine upgrades, revisions to the electrical system, 15-inch wheels rather than 16-inch units used earlier, telescopic shock absorbers, orange front turn signals, a revised rear bumper, and so on. A "Lux" version was also introduced, with a standard roof rack and two-tone bodywork with revised side moldings. From 1962 on, a new OHV inline-four engine became available with power increased to 70 hp (51 kW). This was much more modern than the archaic sidevalve construction used before; when fitted with this engine the car was called the Warszawa 202.

=== 223/224 models ===
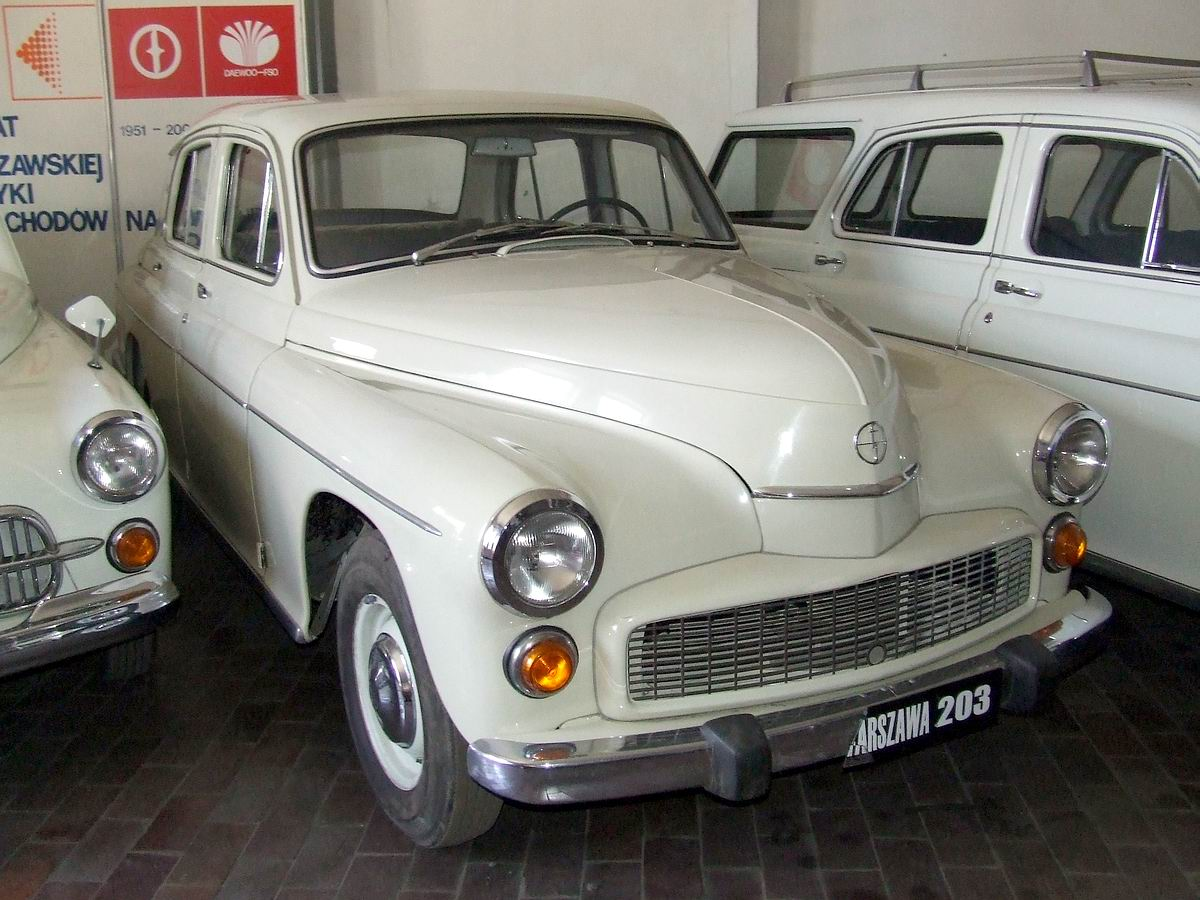
FSO Warszawa 203

In 1964 the body style was changed to a ponton, three-box design by then becoming mainstream in Europe, though the car retained a rather heavy style to western eyes. Model designations were changed to 203 (OHV engine) and 204 (sidevalve engine); in 1968 Peugeot lodged a protest as they had protected three-digit names with a zero in the middle and FSO changed the Warszawa's model numbers to 223 and 224.

In 1967 it was announced that Perkins' four-cylinder, 1.76-litre diesel engines would be fitted in export market Warszawas, which were scheduled to debut at the Poznań International Fair in June 1967. On the same year, the smaller Polski Fiat 125p based on the Italian Fiat 125 entered production and the Warszawa gradually stopped being produced with the last one coming off the assembly line in 1973, with the 125p serving as its successor.

== Modifications ==
The Warszawa was the basis for two rigid panel vans, the Żuk and the Nysa. The gearbox, clutch, and chassis of the Warszawa were also used in the FSR Tarpan. These vehicles led to the basic chassis of the Warszawa being produced until the 1990s. Additionally, there was a commercial variant of the saloon car.

=== FSO Warszawa pickup ===
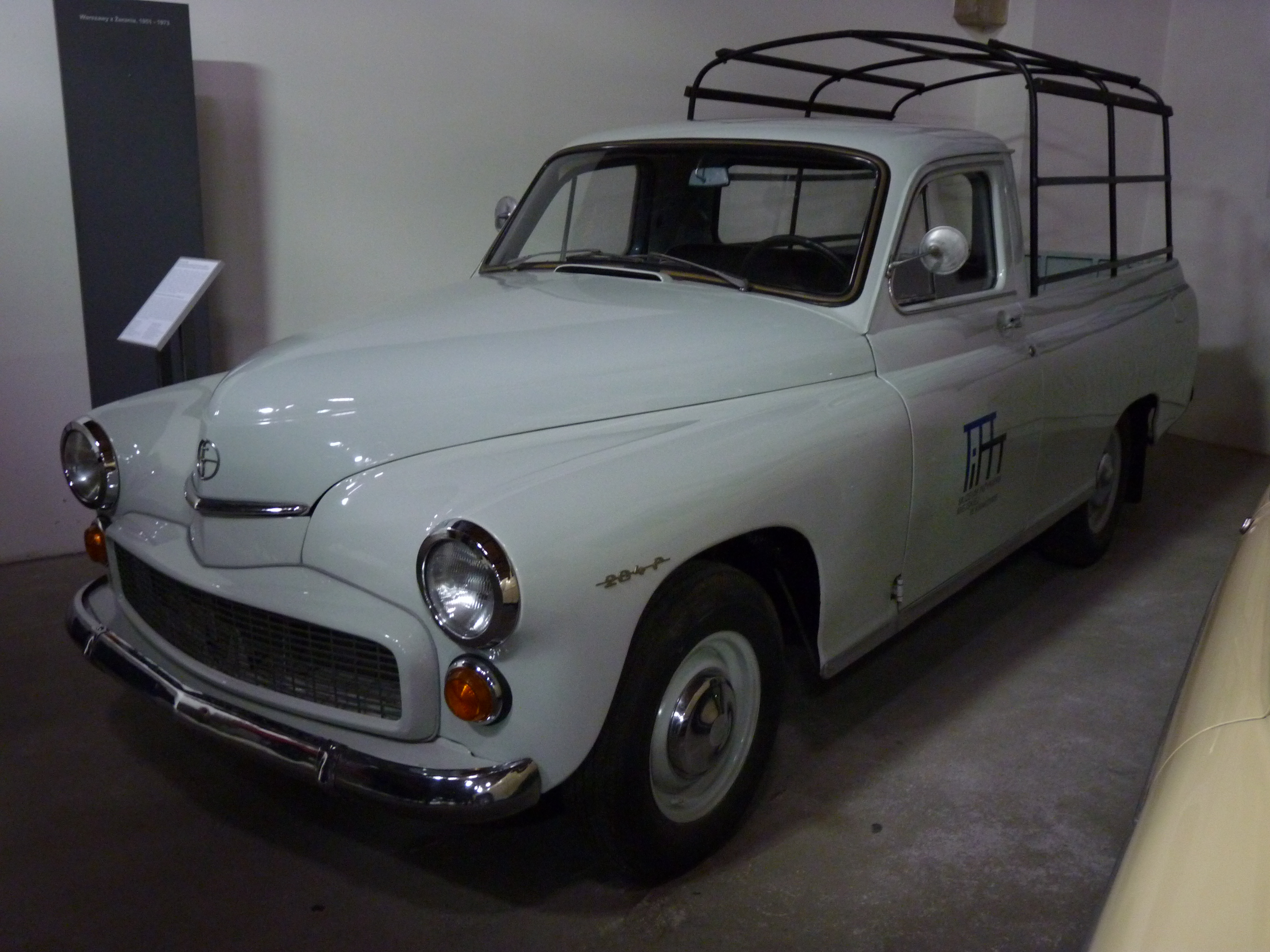
FSO Warszawa 204 P

Development on a pickup (technically coupe utility) version of the Warszawa was undertaken in response to the demand of Polish cyclists who wanted a light delivery vehicle to transport their bikes including spare parts for mechanics. The pickup could carry two people and an additional 500 kg payload in the back. Several hundred pickups were produced annually, but their production was generally limited compared to other models. In the next years, the pickup underwent the same modernizations as passenger versions and was sold almost exclusively to state-owned enterprises and institutions. The maximum speed for the 223 P version was 120 km/h, and for the 224P – 105 km/h.

The speedometer indicated that the speed should not be exceeded 70 km/h with the vehicle fully loaded. The truck bed was equipped with an opening tailgate suspended on the lower edge, the side boards were fixed. The floor of the loading space was made of pine boards, and was additionally secured with a tarpaulin spread over an upper steel body.

=== FSO Warszawa van ===
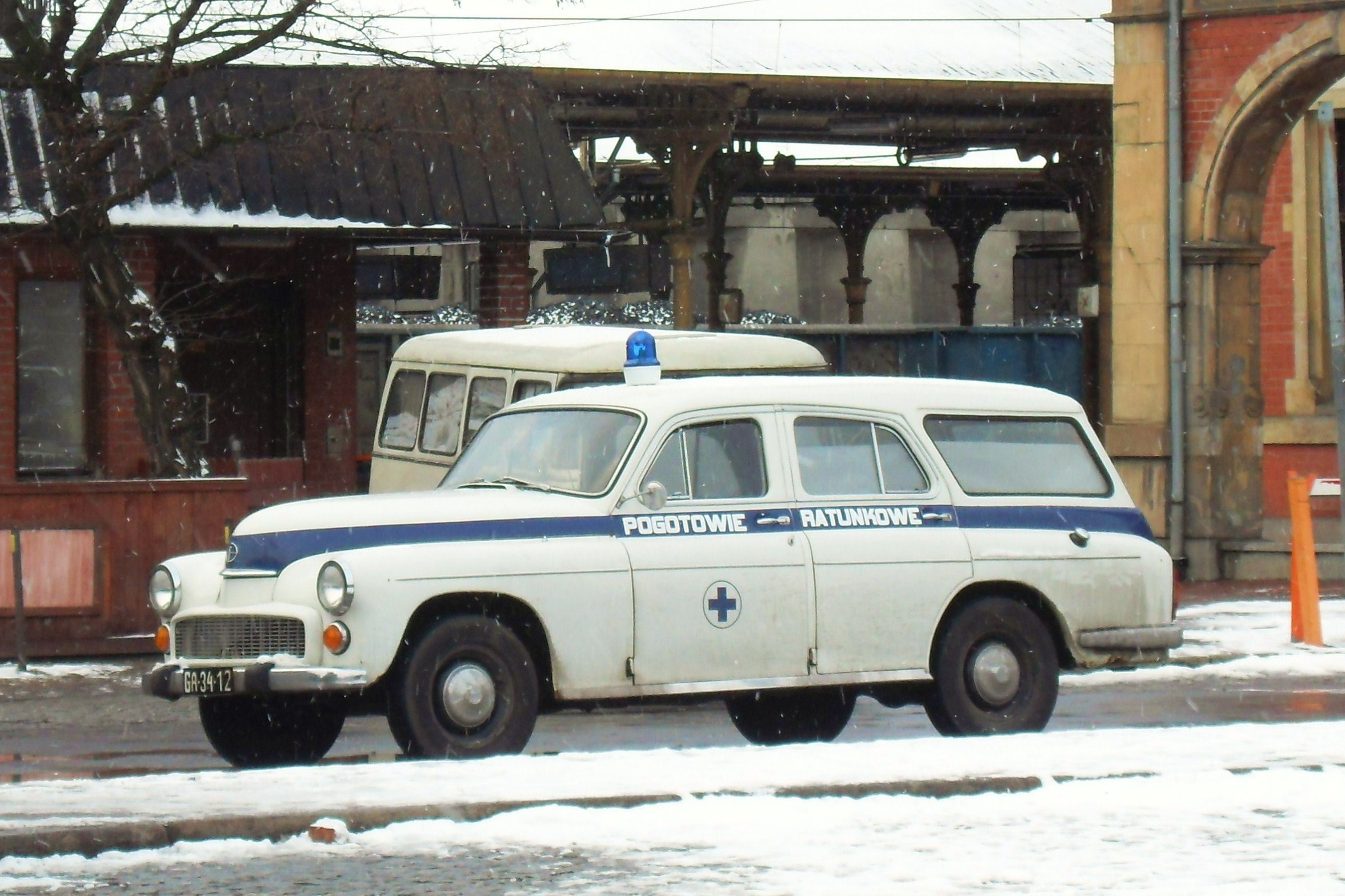
FSO Warszawa ambulance, a variant of the van range

A commercial van model was also produced, making the concept similar to the contemporary sedan delivery. This modification was called the 201 F (The F standing for Furgon). The car was equipped with two doors, the fuel tank was moved under the driver's seat, the spare wheel was placed under the floor at the rear of the body, which resulted in a relatively large usable area. Access to the cargo space was possible through a two-piece rear hatch, the individual parts of which were hung on the lower and upper edge of the door opening. The car's suspension was reinforced although it only had the payload capacity of 400 kg compared to the 500 kg of the pickup version. A version with side glasses was also produced and was used as an ambulance regularly.

In 1964, production of the modernized 203 F and 204 F models began. Modernization of the body was limited to the front part only. The other changes were the same as in the passenger versions. In 1965, the van models were withdrawn from the market due to the commencement of production of Warsaw 203 K / 204 K with a station wagon body.

=== FSO Warszawa station wagon ===
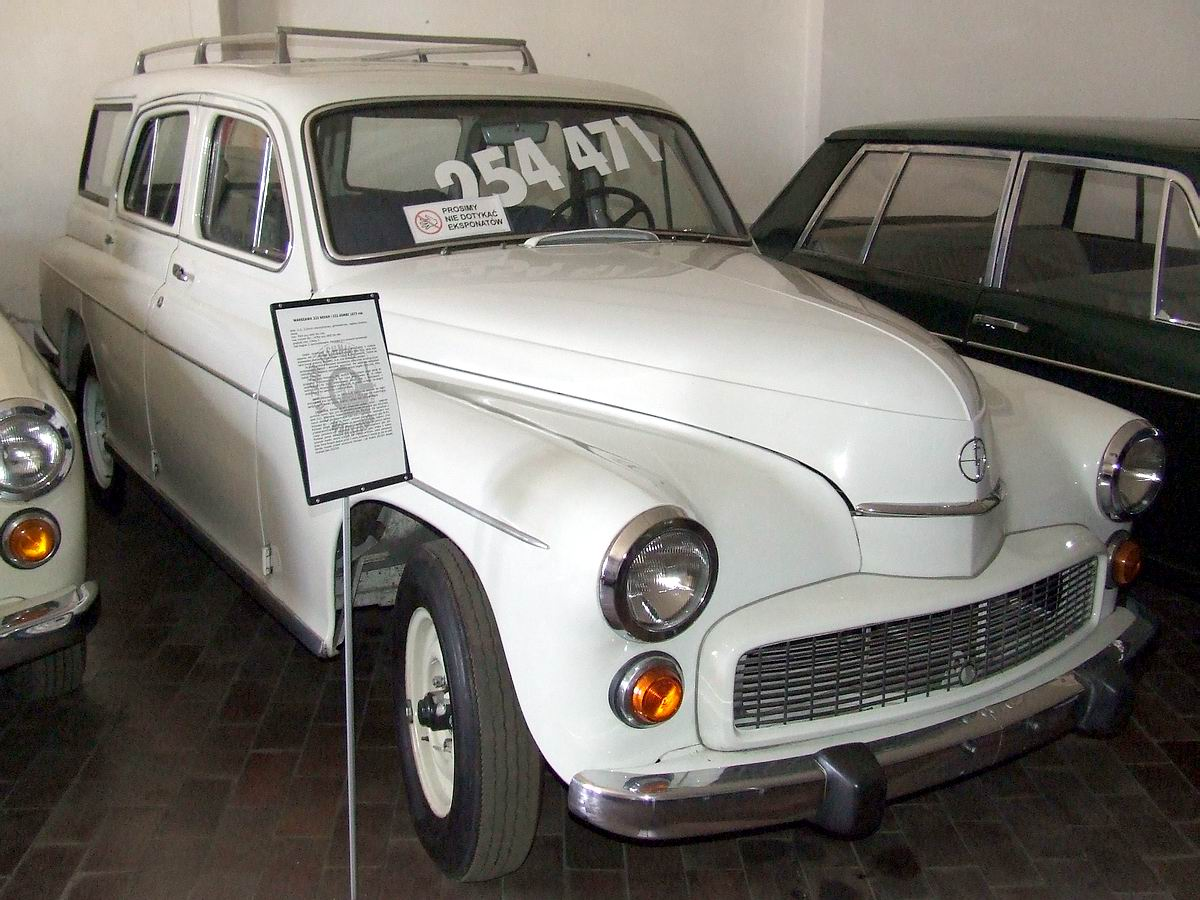
FSO Warszawa 223 K

In June 1965 during the Poznań International Fair, a station wagon version of the Warszawa was presented. The new models were called the 203 K and 204 K (later changed to 223 K and 224 K) and entered mass production at the end of the same year. The design of the body was developed by Cezary Nawrot, while the technical development was made by a team of employees of the Body Design Office, under the supervision of Eng. Stanisław Łukaszewicz.

Compared to the sedan version, the roof was extended and the luggage compartment glazing was installed above the rear fenders. The station wagon version was additionally equipped with a fixed roof rack with a load capacity of 40 kg, reinforced suspension and wider tires. The top speed of the 223 K version was 128 km/h (80 mph), 115 km/h (71 mph) for the sidevalve 224 K.

=== Draisine ===
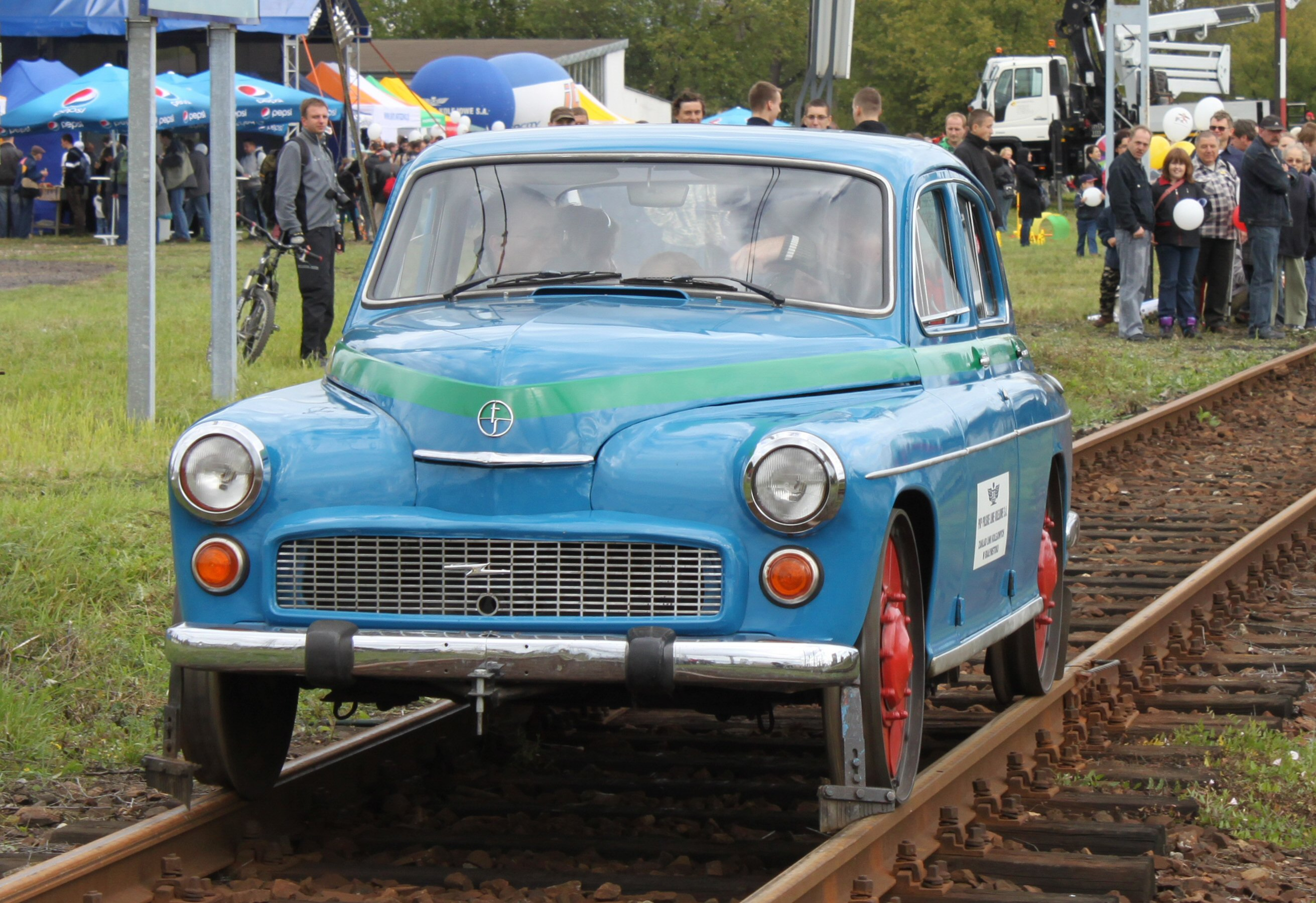
One of the few FSO Warszawa draisines surviving.

A draisine of the Warszawa was also produced and used by the Polish State Railways, mainly for field trips for inspections. Production of this variant was between 1956–1973. Most draisines were sedan models although pickup models were also built. A small number of station wagons were also built for export markets. The steering system was made for driving straight ahead, and a turntable was mounted under the chassis (a screw jack was used to rotate the trolley on the track, after it was lifted, in order to allow driving in both directions at full speed). With further changes, the rear light was modified (red lights at the front instead of the direction indicators and white light at the rear instead of the stop), the brushes in front of the wheels were installed and the suspension was tied with steel cables (to facilitate lifting the car). The maximum speed was 105 km/h (65 mph), but due to the long braking distance on the track, PKP regulations then limited it to 80 km/h (50 mph).

The exact number of draisines produced is not known, but together with export production but it is estimated that only 200 of these vehicles were ever produced. These draisines were also exported to Czechoslovakia and Bulgaria. In Hungary, a copy of the Warszawa draisine was also built with advanced changes. These draisines were regularly used in both Poland and export markets until the mid-1990s when they were massively taken off service and scrapped, which leads to only a few handful draisines surviving to this today. Moreover, in recent years, several cars have been independently adapted to non-original draisines by collectors.

=== Police car ===
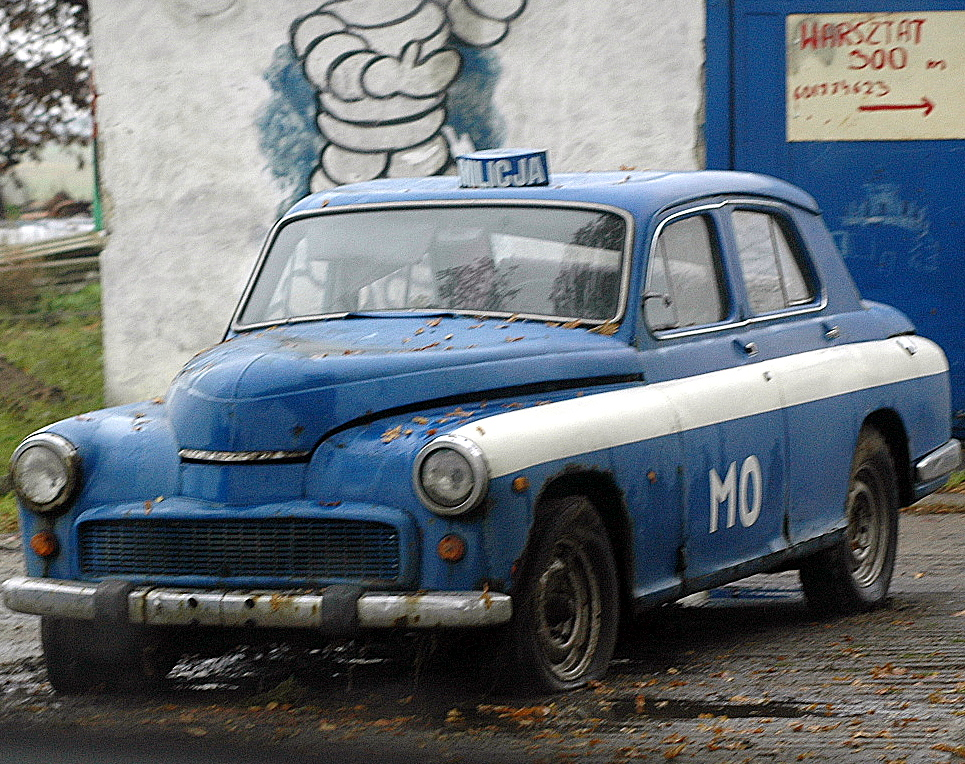
FSO Warszawa abandoned police car

A police car version of the Warszawa was also produced for the Milicja Obywatelska and the Polish army. The last such batch was built in 1972.

The police car was based on the civilian version. However, it differed in painting (white or cream body with a blue stripe and Milicja or MO markings), a blue light signal mounted on the roof, and a two-tone siren. Additionally, matte rear and side windows were installed.

The police car received the same modernizations as the civilian and commercial models. How many police cars were produced has never been officially stated since it is likely that as these cars were intended for state purposes, production was never taken in records of how many police vehicles were built or registered.

In comparison to the special ordered GAZ M20-Pobeda for the KGB, this version retained the four-cylinder engine of the Warszawa, as the passenger and commercial models had.

== Proposed replacements ==
Ever since the 1950s, many attempts were made at replacing or modernizing the outdated Warszawa.

=== FSO Warsawa M-20U ===
In 1956, the first prototype of modernized Warsawa was presented. This model was designated as the FSO Warszawa M-20U. It was characterized by a completely changed front part of the body. The bonnet, front and rear fenders, bumpers, front turn signal lamps and a radiator grille with a centrally located third headlight, referring to the representative design of the Tatra 603, were new. At the rear of the body, vertical combined turn signal and brake lamps were used, and the rear fenders were lengthened, which increased the overall length of the car by 5 cm. The interior of the vehicle was also modernized, including a new dashboard. A new steering wheel, upholstery and seat filling were introduced. The heating system was redesigned to regulate the temperature with the flow of hot water rather than the warm air stream. The changes made to the body did not affect its supporting structure and were aimed at modernizing the silhouette of the vehicle with the use of as few modifications to the production tooling as possible. The engine was slightly modernized, which after changes was designated M-20U. The compression ratio was increased to 7:1, thanks to which the power unit reached 60 hp (44.1 kW) at 3900 rpm. and a maximum torque of 127 Nm. The gearbox is equipped with an electrically engaged overdrive with a 0.83:1 ratio with a synchronizer located in a separate housing attached to the rear wall of the gearbox. The modernized Warsaw M-20U could reach a top speed of 132 km/h. The front brakes were equipped with a system of concurrent shoes (Duplex), telescopic shock absorbers were used in the suspension system, and the characteristics of the rear leaf springs were also changed. This model did not go beyond the prototype stage.

=== FSO Warsawa Ghia ===
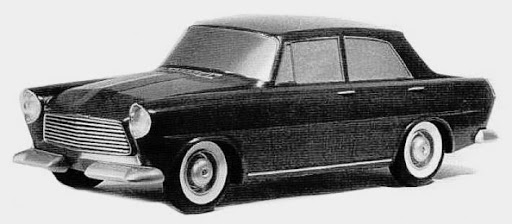
FSO Warsawa Ghia

In 1957, in order to construct a modern body for the Warszawa M-20 car, cooperation was established with the Italian company Carrozzeria Ghia from Turin. In the autumn of 1957, two complete chassis were sent to Italy, which in the first half of 1959 were sent back to Polish as driving prototypes of a sedan and a station wagon, which were presented to the First Secretary of the Polish United Workers' Party Władysław Gomułka. In addition, technical documentation, models of stamping dies and sets of model body sheets were sent from Italy. The constructor of the prototype of the new Warsawa was Sergio Sartorelli, one of the most outstanding Italian designers, the creator of, Karmann Ghia's Volkswagen and the Fiat 126, Regata and Ritmo. The prototypes used many components and accessories from vehicles produced in Italy and the United States at the time, such as Lancia, Fiat, Alfa Romeo and Chrysler. The project never went into production, mainly due to the excessively high costs of putting it into production, as well as the process itself. The cars were sent to the Research and Development Center in Falenica near Warsaw, where they were scrapped together with a number of other Polish prototypes in the years 1976–1978. The design of the car cost $62,000.

=== FSO Warszawa 210 ===
A prototype called the FSO Warszawa 210 was built in 1964. It had a 6-cylinder engine and a more modern body reminiscent of then-current car trends in Europe, although it still had the old Pobeda-derived chassis.

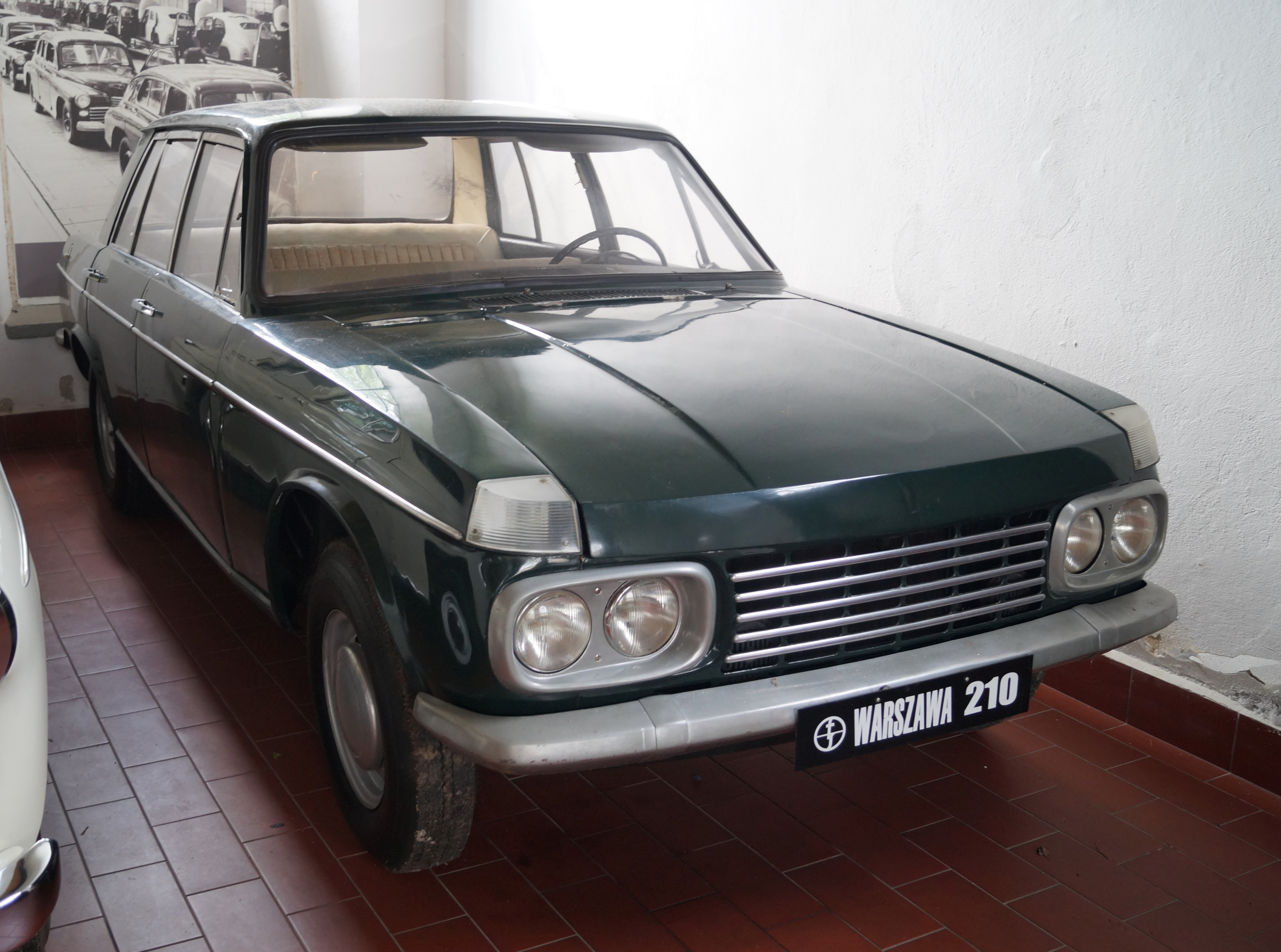
The FSO Warszawa 210 in a museum.

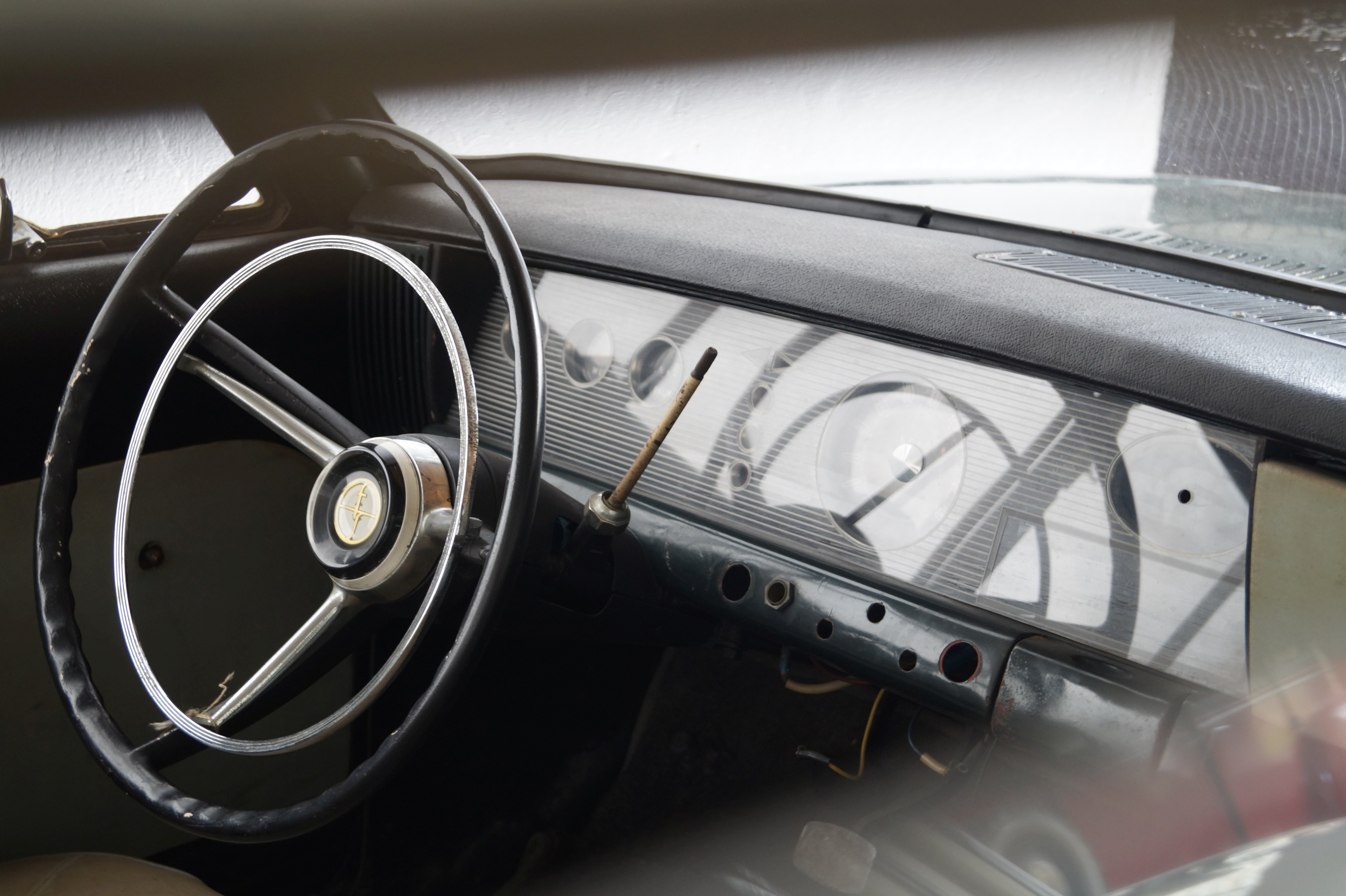
Interior

== Export ==
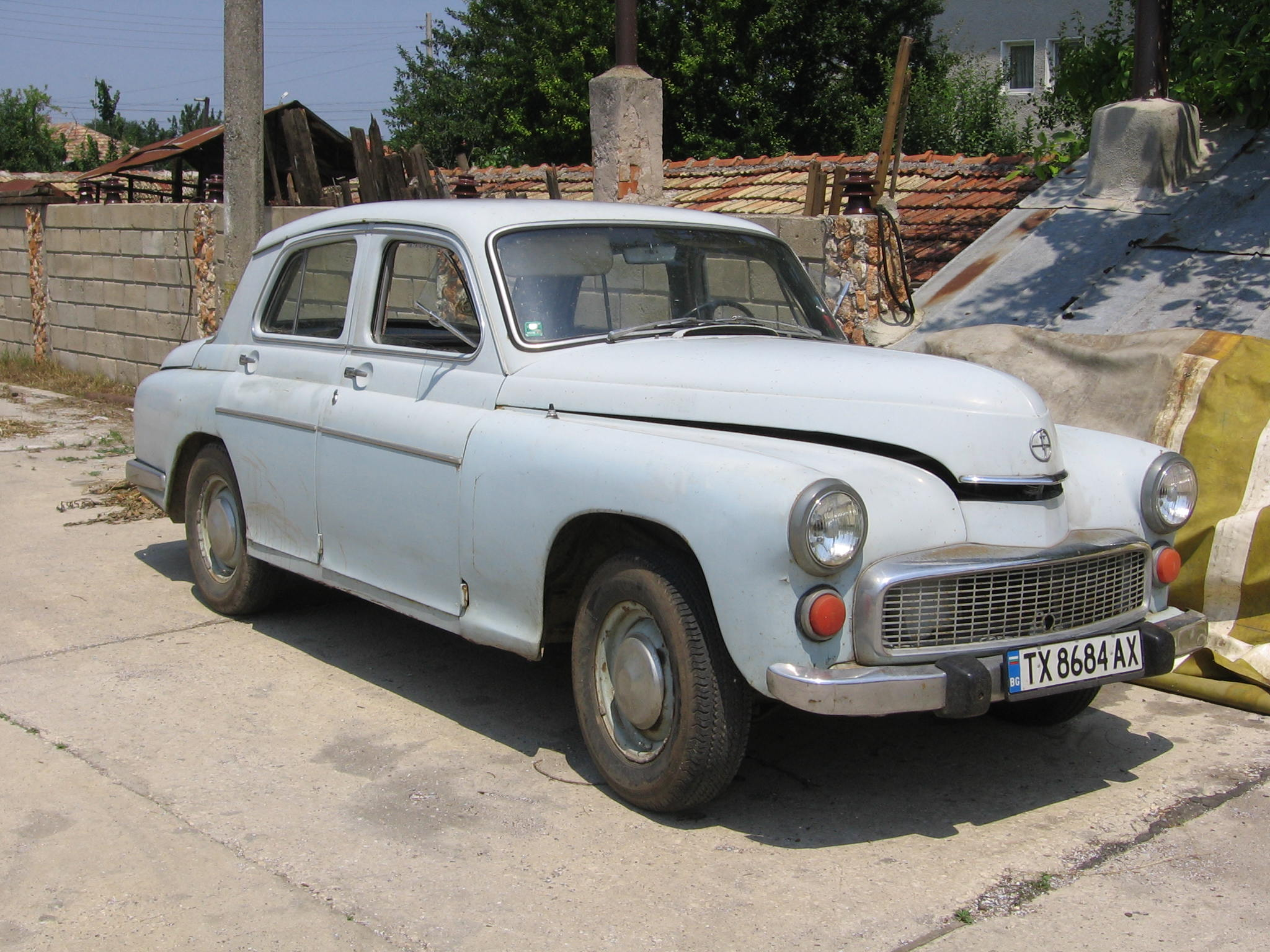
FSO Warszawa in Bulgaria

Exports of the Warszawa started in 1954. By 1973, 72,834 copies were sent to export markets. The Warszawa was exported to 25 countries located on five continents, and the recipients of the largest number of cars were the countries of the Eastern Bloc. According to some sources, the number of cars sent abroad amounts to 81,804 units, which is due to the fact that 8,970 units sold in Poland as part of internal export are included in the statistics.

The largest export market for the Warszawa was Bulgaria, where 26,655 were exported. 21,142 were sent to Hungary, 8,050 to China, 5,653 to Romania, 3,396 to Czechoslovakia, 2,217 to Turkey, 998 to Cuba, 841 to Norway, 615 to Finland, 436 to Albania, 365 to Iran, 316 to East Germany, 218 to Yugoslavia, 146 to Mongolia, 139 to Vietnam, 113 to North Korea, 98 to Guinea, 63 to Greece, 40 to Saudi Arabia, 37 to Libya, 25 to Burma and 26 were even exported back to Soviet Russia, where the Pobeda had originated from and was sold alongside the more modern Volgas.

In China, the Fenghuang (meaning Phoenix in English) sedan was developed in 1958, which was based on the Warszawa chassis and engine, but the body was styled after the 1956 Packard Patrician and Packard Clipper models. Later, a V8 engine was used alongside a six-cylinder engine. Another prototype named the Jiaotong was built in 1959. Nevertheless, it was eventually decided to use the Mercedes-Benz 220S (W180) from 1954 as the basis of the car and the resulting vehicle was put as the Shanghai SH760 in production in 1964.

== End of production ==
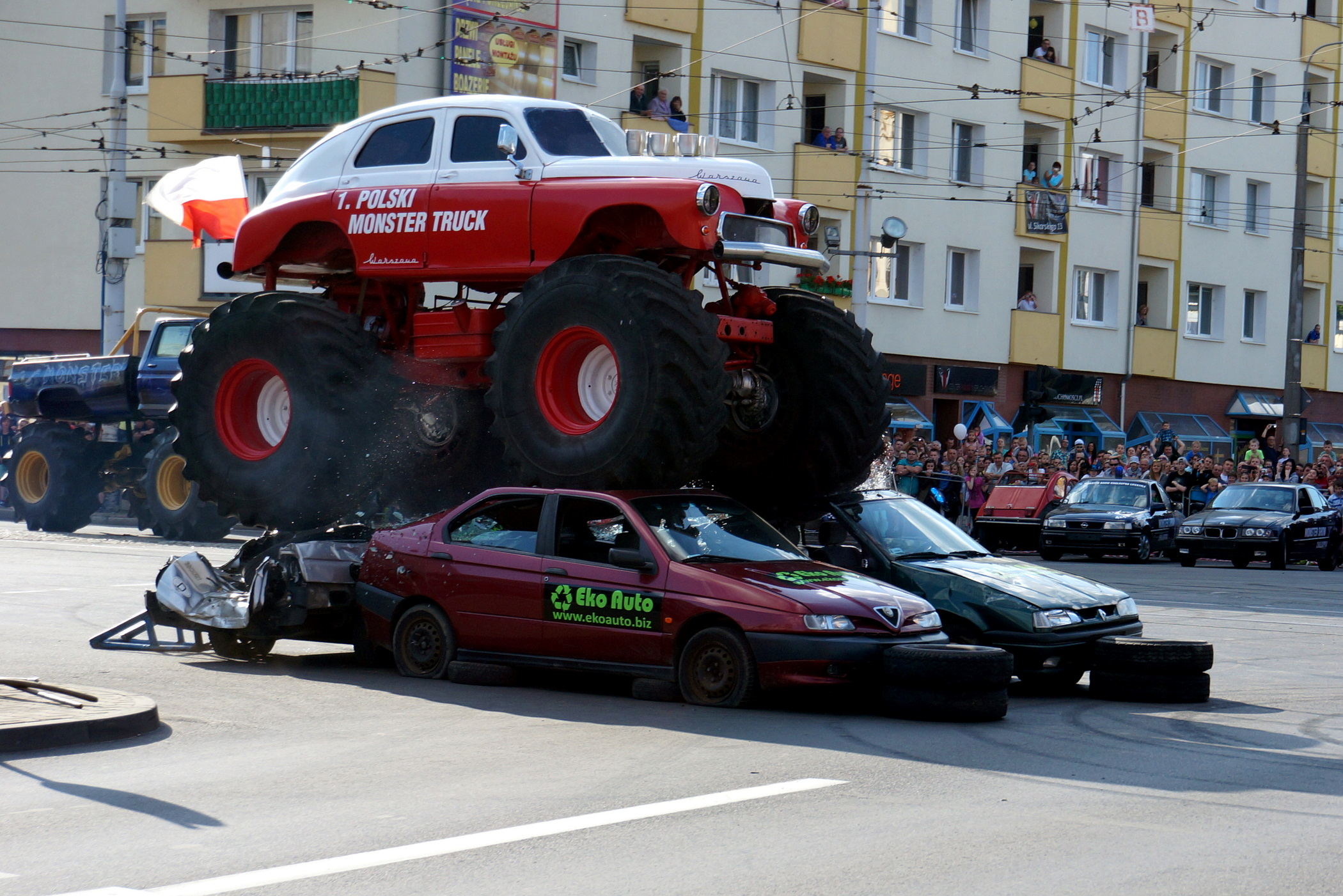
Monster truck based on the Warszawa

By the time the Warszawa started production it was already largely outdated since the Pobeda on which it was based on started production in 1946 and had technical features derived from the 1938 Opel Kapitän. Despite successive modernizations over time, the body looked increasingly outdated. From 1965, plans were made to introduce a successor to the outdated Warszawa. Two variants were options, the first was the production of new FSO products – the Warszawa 210 and Syrena 110, and the second was the purchase of a license for a modern foreign model. The second option was chosen, and negotiations with Renault and Fiat began. The French offer was rejected due to unfavorable conditions; Fiat offered the Poles the 1300/1500 model, but the model was considered too small to replace the Warszawa.

Nevertheless, FSO choose Fiat to partner with and decided that the larger Fiat 125 was more suitable as a successor, although the Polish version still used the lower-cost mechanics of the 1300/1500. Production of the Warszawa continued until late 1973; by that time it utilized many parts from the Polski Fiat 125p. The more compact and modern 125p sold much better than the Warszawa, particularly in export markets.
