= FSO Syrena Sport =

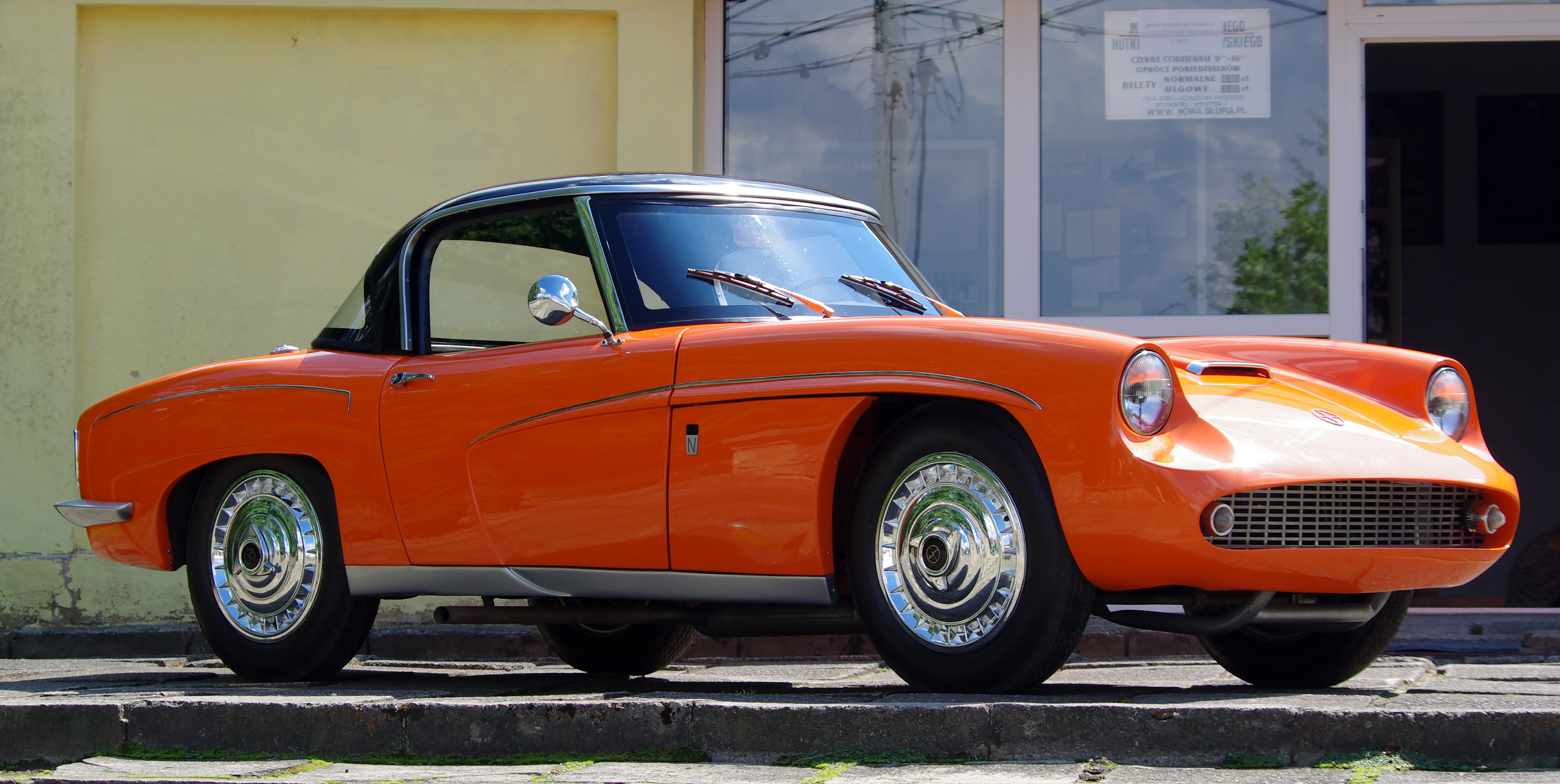
- Replica of the 1960 FSO Syrena Sport

Overview
- Manufacturer: FSO
- Production: 1957–1960

Body and chassis
- Class: Sports car
- Body style: 2-door coupé

Powertrain
- Engine: 700 cc four-stroke I2
- Transmission: 4-speed manual

Dimensions
- Curb weight: 710 kg (1,565.3 lb)

The FSO Syrena Sport was a Polish concept sports car designed and built in the late 1950s by a group of engineers at the Fabryka Samochodów Osobowych (FSO), which due to economic and political reasons never went into mass production.

== Construction ==
The FSO Syrena Sport was 2-door coupe with a fibreglass body on a steel chassis with strengthened floor panel. The engine was a new design 4-stroke 2-cylinder air-cooled boxer engine with aluminium block. The cast-iron cylinders, cylinder heads and pistons were from the S-03 engine of the Polish motorcycle Junak. The prototype engine was fitted with accessories (carburettor, ignition, etc.) from a French car Panhard Dyna Z. It had a displacement of 700 cc and developed around 35 bhp (26 kW) at 6000 rpm, which provided adequate performance for this light car (710 kg).

The engine was placed in front of the front axle and powered front wheels through a 4-gear manual gearbox, identical with that of Syrena 100. The front suspension was not identical with that from the classic Syrena, but based on the same concept: independent with single transverse feathercoil, lower A-wishbones and hydraulic dampers. Single-circuit drum brakes were installed on all wheels. Specific for Syrena Sport was the independent rear suspension, with trailing arms, torsion bars and almost horizontal hydraulic dampers. Another difference was a floor gear-shift mechanism and hydraulic-operated clutch.

== History ==
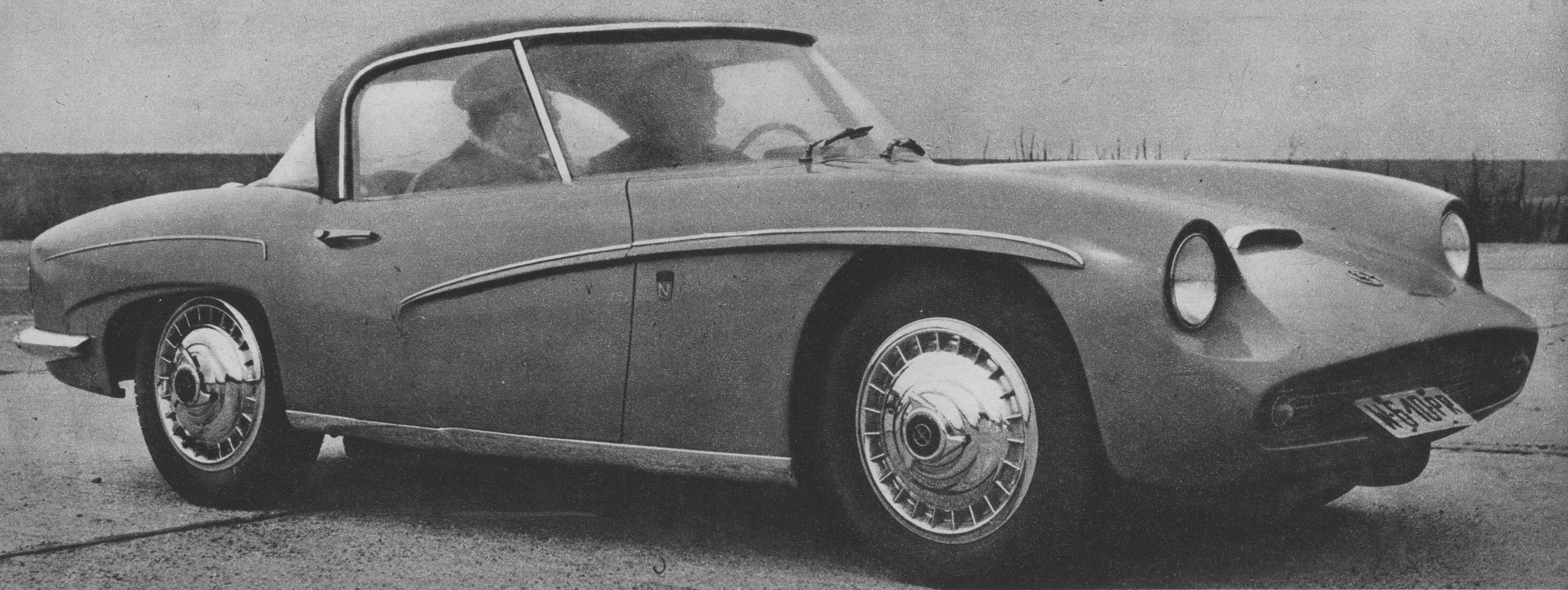
FSO Syrena Sport

The FSO Syrena Sport was built at FSO in Warsaw between 1957 and 1960, and designed by Cezary Nawrot.

Originally, the car was not intended for production – it was a test platform for a number of solutions and production technologies intended for the modification of Syrena sedan, which was mass-produced since 1955. Cezary Nawrot on purpose designed a very low and flat bonnet, to avoid a standard 2-stroke 2-cylinder S-15 engine (used in other Syrenas) to be installed in this car. Consequently, the available, completely new 4-stroke flat-twin engine, designated S-16, designed by Władysław Skoczyński and Andrzej Zatoń was used. Contrary to a widespread opinion, the engine did not share internal components with Panhard Dyna - only Panhard's engine accessories, such as the carburettor and ignition were used to simplify testing of the prototype.

The intended rated power was around 50 bhp, but the first prototype developed around 35 bhp - performance test were carried out, but their results have not been preserved. Stanisław Łukaszewicz was the chief designer of another important innovation: self-supporting chassis with strengthened floor panel - other Syrenas at that time used traditional steel ladder frame. The body of the car was moulded in fibreglass, which was the first such attempt at FSO. Syrena Sport also had a new independent rear suspension with trailing arms and torsion bars designed by Antoni Drozdek. Some other systems were built and tested, such as FSO's first floor shifting mechanism and hydraulic-controlled clutch. Naturally, many mechanical and electrical parts were taken directly from other versions of the Syrena, including transmission, headlights, dials, etc.

The young team of designers were largely given free hand in realising their aspirations, and the resulting design was largely praised by critics. Chief designer Cezary Nawrot admitted being inspired by various Ferrari models and Mercedes-Benz 190SL. After its presentation on the Labour Day, (1 May) the car quickly became a sensation, and was widely described in the automobile press of the day – especially the "Motor" weekly. At least once the car featured in the daily TV news programme "Dziennik Telewizyjny" (TV Journal). A short mention and a photo of Syrena Sport appeared in the prestigious Swiss yearly Automobile Year 1960–1961, and in May 1960 the Italian nationwide daily newspaper "Il Giorno" described Syrena Sport as "the most beautiful car built behind the Iron Curtain".

Contrary to initial plans, the Polish press and the general public pressed for the production of the Syrena Sport. Two state-owned companies even declared readiness to manufacture fibreglass bodies. This was in turn an uncomfortable situation for the management of the FSO and the government, which never intended to mass-produce the Sport. A frequently quoted (although not fully substantiated) story says that either the Prime Minister Józef Cyrankiewicz or the First Secretary of the Communist Party Władysław Gomułka personally called the factory and ordered to moth-ball the project. Until that moment, the car had driven some 29,000 km on the factory test track and on public roads outside of the FSO, and generally proved to be adequately designed. After that intervention, tests were abandoned and the car was stored in a garage at the Development Centre in Warszawa-Falenica. Following a mindless decision, it was purposefully destroyed in the late 1970s together with a number of other FSO prototypes, in order to free up garage space.

The surviving historical material are a few dozens black and white and hand-coloured photographs, press articles and plans drawn by Zbigniew Grochowski, which were published in "Mały Modelarz" model-makers' magazine in 1961.

== Aftermath ==
Work on the S-16 engine continued, and at least another similar engine (code-named S-17) was built, with a modified engine block and custom-built cylinders and heads (different from those from the Junak S-03 engine). All development of this engine was abandoned with the introduction of the new three-cylinder in-line two-stroke S-31 engine for Syrena. The prototype of the S-17 engine has been preserved until our times at the Oldtimer Museum in Otrębusy near Warsaw.

A prototype of the modified Syrena sedan designated "104" was presented in 1961. Among a number of modifications was the independent rear suspension, identical with that from Syrena Sport. This modified car was in turn not mass-produced either, and until the end of production in 1983 Syrena had a non-independent rear suspension, with transverse feather-coil and rigid axle.

== See also ==
- List of Eastern European cars

== Bibliography ==
- Artur Markowski, Marcin Możejko: Syrena Sport – Czas na rekonstrukcję!, Classicauto, 2011, no. 56, p. 24–33
- Artur Markowski, Marcin Możejko: Syrena Sport – Silnik z komputera, Classicauto, 2011, no. 61, p. 40–43
- Andrzej Glajzer: Prawdy i legendy - Syrena Sport, Automobilista, 2010, no. 1, p. 14–23
- Katarzyna Kociuba: Czysta radość tworzenia - wywiad z profesorem Cezarym Nawrotem, Automobilista, 2000, no. 1, p. 12–16
- Andrzej Zieliński: Polskie konstrukcje motoryzacyjne 1947–1960. Warszawa: Wydawnictwa Komunikacji i Łączności, 2006. ISBN 978-83-206-1541-8, p. 36–38
- Z. Glinka: Naprawa samochodów FSO Syrena, Wydawnictwo Komunikacji i Łączności, Warszawa 1969.
- Stanisław Szelichowski: Punkty na zachętę Motor, 2005, no. 2 (2691)
- Karol Jerzy Mórawski: Syrena. Samochód PRL, Wydawnictwo TRIO, Warszawa 2005
- Zdzisław D. Skoczek: Kulisy Polskiej Motoryzacji: Syrena zdaje egzamin, Motor, 2006 no. 28
- Bernard Vermaylen: Voitures des Pays de l'Est, ETAI 2008, p. 64–65
- Andrzej Bukowski: Zmodernizowana Syrena, Młody Technik, 1961 no. 8, p. 61–63
- R. Lange: Syrena, Sport – Studium gotowe, Motor no. 19 (419), 1960 p. 1; 8–9
- A. Zieliński, M. Wachowski, S. Kubiak: Wielkie Nadzieje, Motor no. 21 (421), 1960, p. 8–9
- Wiktor Bryx: My też chcemy podziwiać, Motor no. 26 (426), 1960, p. 11
