= Fabryka Samochodów Małolitrażowych =

Polish automobile factory

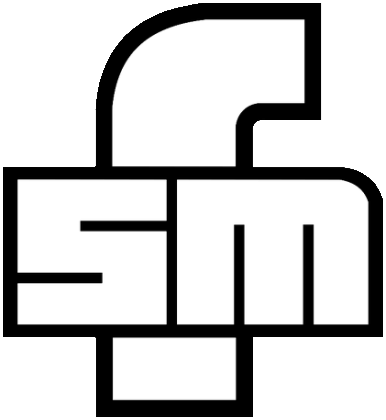
- Industry: Automotive
- Founded: 1948 (WSM); 1971 (FSM)
- Defunct: 1992
- Fate: Acquired
- Successor: Fiat Auto Poland
- Headquarters: Bielsko-Biała, Poland
- Products: Automobiles

The Fabryka Samochodów Małolitrażowych (meaning Small Car Factory), commonly known as FSM, was a Polish automobile factory born from an agreement between the FSO and Fiat in the 1970s for the construction of a new model, the Polski Fiat 126p, the Polish version of Fiat 126. For the project a new manufacturing plant was opened in Tychy. Until the beginning of the 1980s the factory also produced the FSO Syrena. The FSM brand was active between 1971 and 1992, when it was privatised and Fiat Group took control of it for one zloty.

After the factory was renamed Fiat Auto Poland, it produced the Fiat Cinquecento and its successor the Fiat Seicento; the Polish factory was the only location where these models were assembled. The last Polski Fiat 126p was made in 2000. Fiat Auto Poland also produced the second-generation Fiat Panda (2003 to 2012) and the Fiat 500 (2007 to 2024). Since 2023, the plant has produced the Fiat 600.

Fiat Auto Poland's other plant at Bielsko-Biała, primarily devoted to manufacturing components, became the center of the joint venture between Fiat Group and General Motors Europe for the construction of the small 1.3-litre Multijet diesel engine.

== Former production ==
Models that were produced at the Bielsko-Biała and Tychy factories (FSM and Fiat Auto Poland):

- FSM Syrena 105/105L (1972–1983, Bielsko-Biała), 344,077 units produced
- Polski Fiat 126p (1973–2000, Bielsko-Biała and Tychy), 3,318,674 units produced
- Polski Fiat 126 BIS (1987–1991, Bielsko-Biała), a dual trunk hatchback version of the 126p - 190,361 units produced
- FSM Cinquecento (1991–1992), Fiat Cinquecento (1991–1998, Tychy), 1,103,684 units produced
- Fiat Uno (1994–2002, Bielsko-Biała and Tychy), 173,382 units produced
- Fiat Seicento (1998–2010, Tychy), 1,328,973 units produced
- Fiat Siena (1997–2001, Bielsko-Biała and Tychy)
- Fiat Palio Weekend (1998–2004, Bielsko-Biała and Tychy).
- Fiat Nuova Panda (2003–2012), 2,168,491 units produced
- Ford Ka II (2008–2016)

== Gallery ==
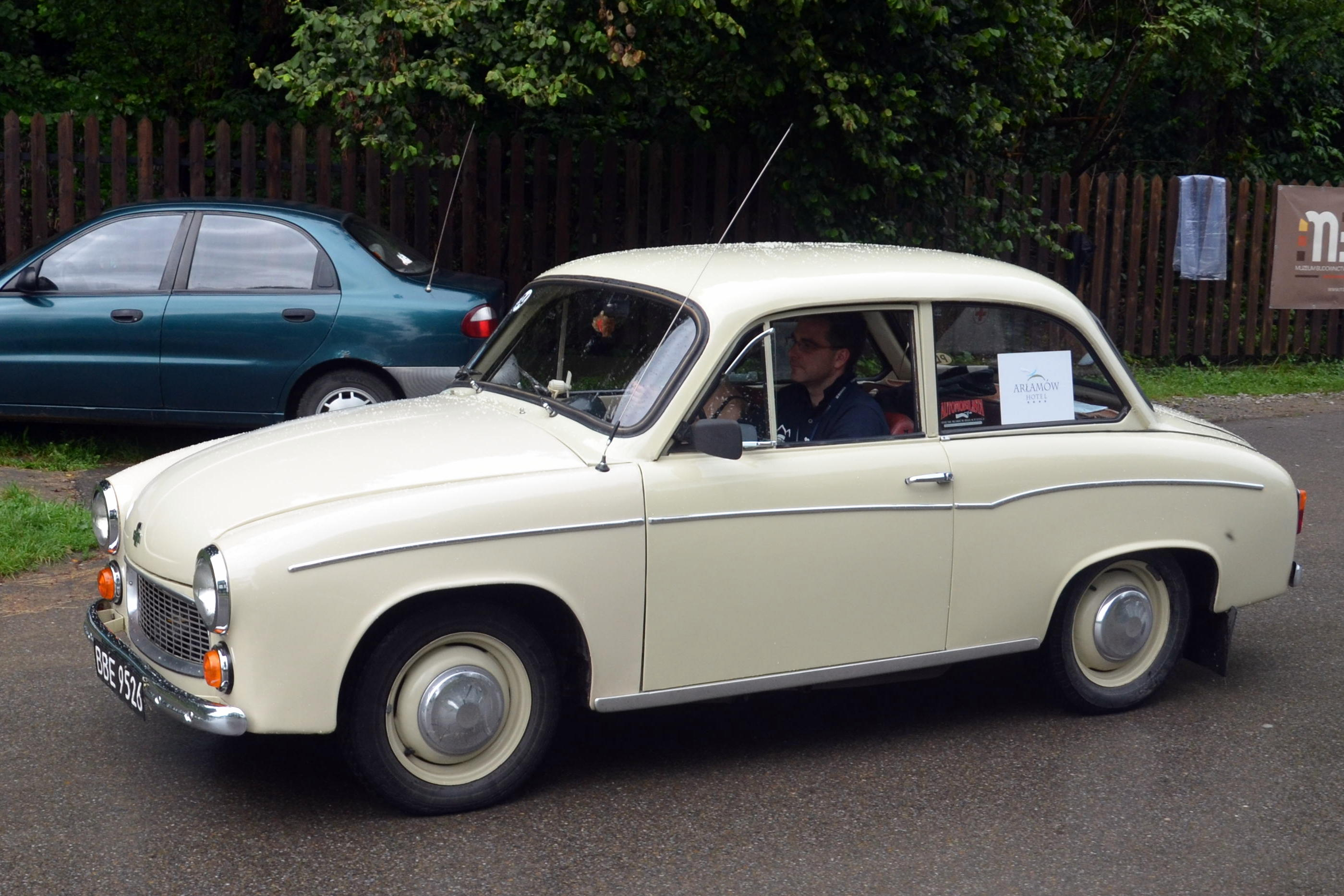
FSM Syrena 105

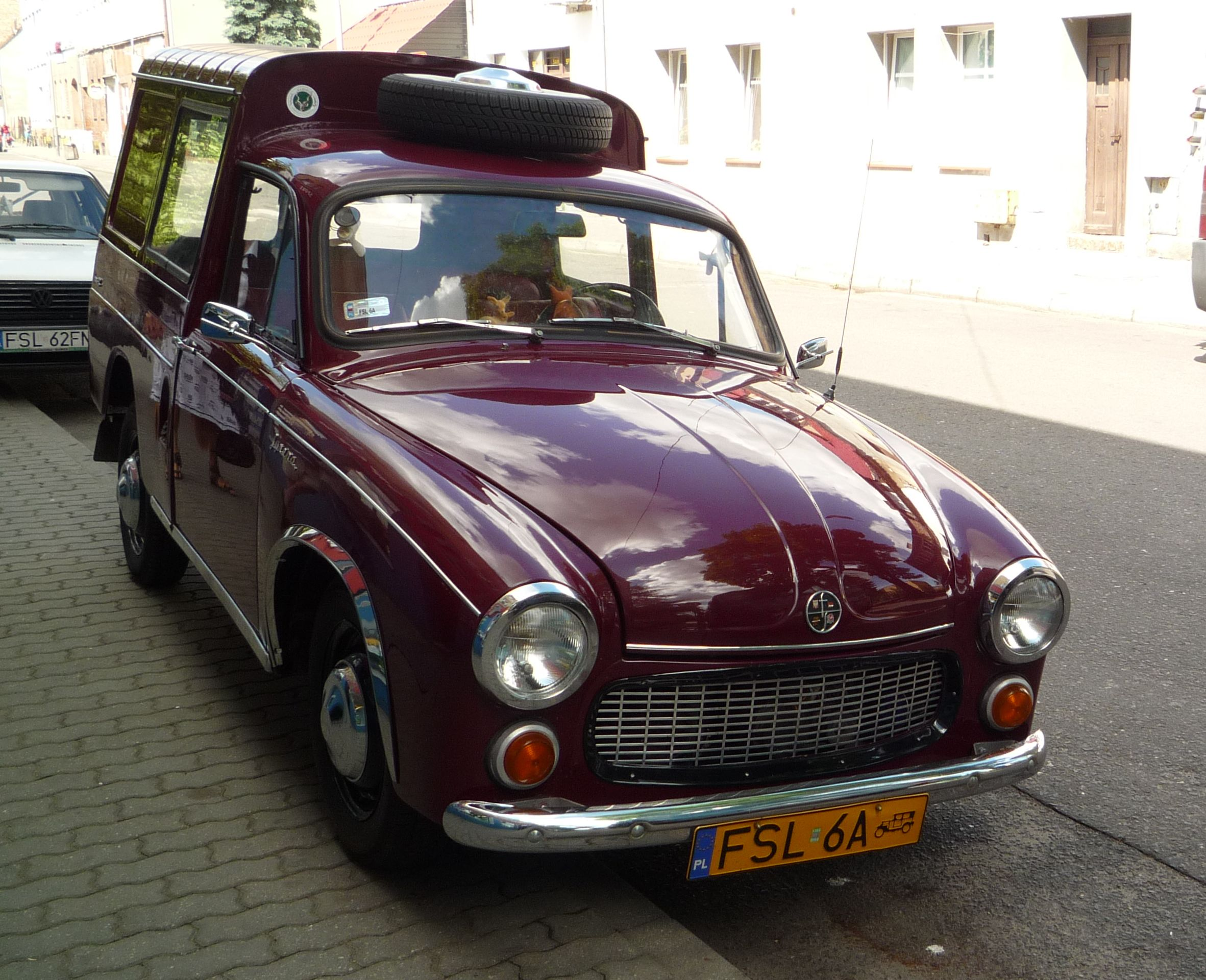
FSM Syrena Bosto

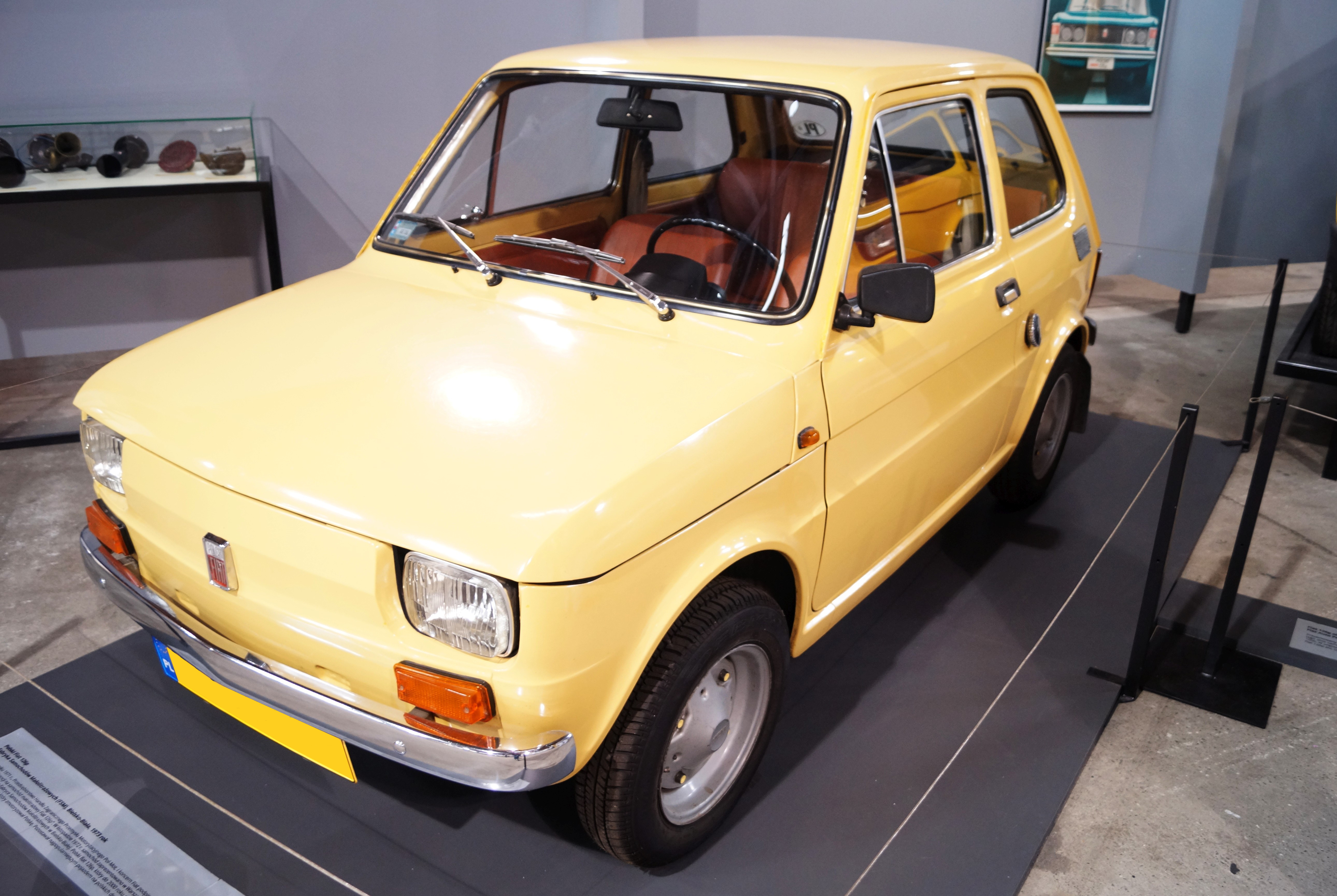
Polski Fiat 126p

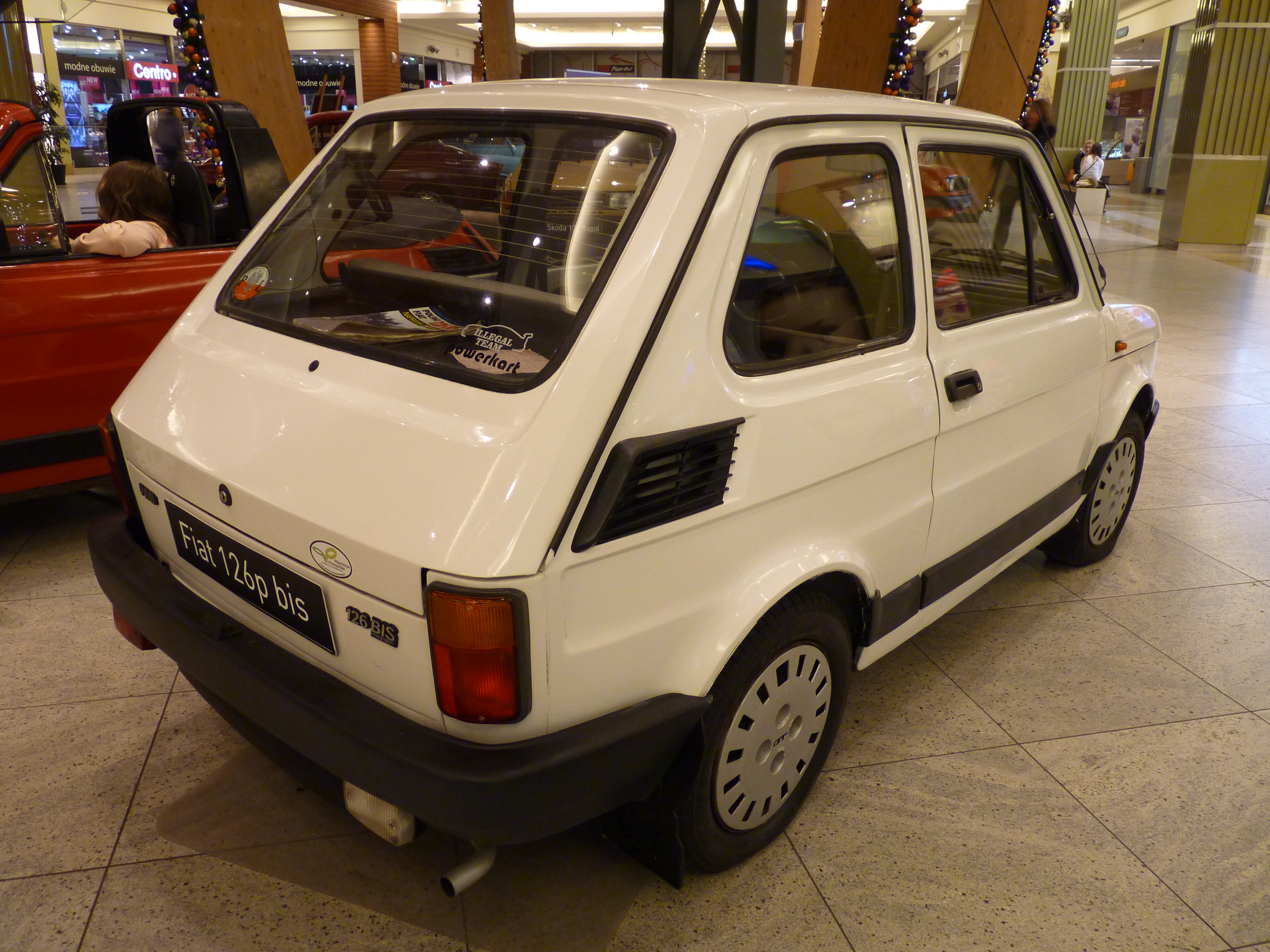
Fiat 126 BIS (Polski Fiat 126 BIS)

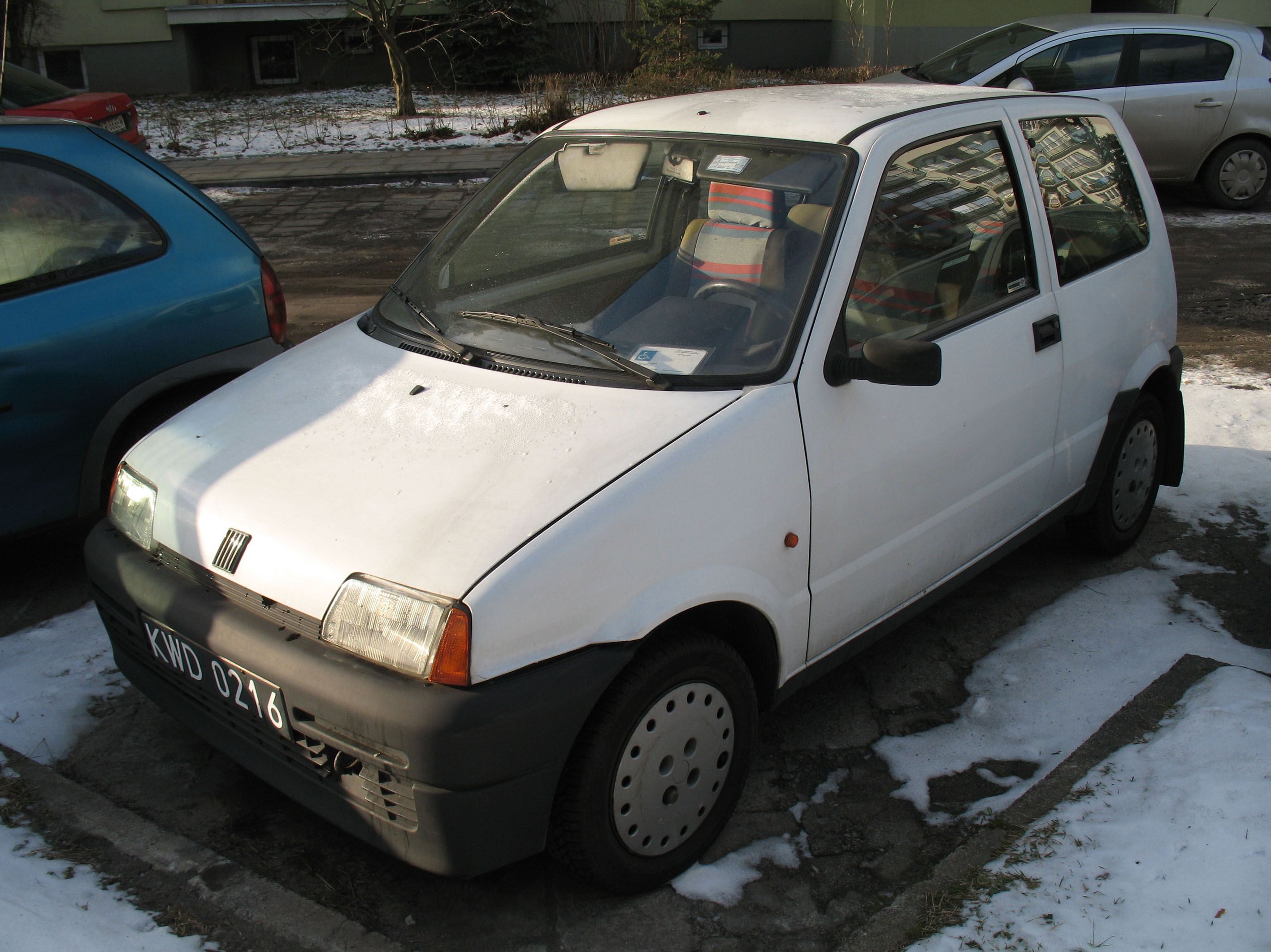
FSM Cinquecento

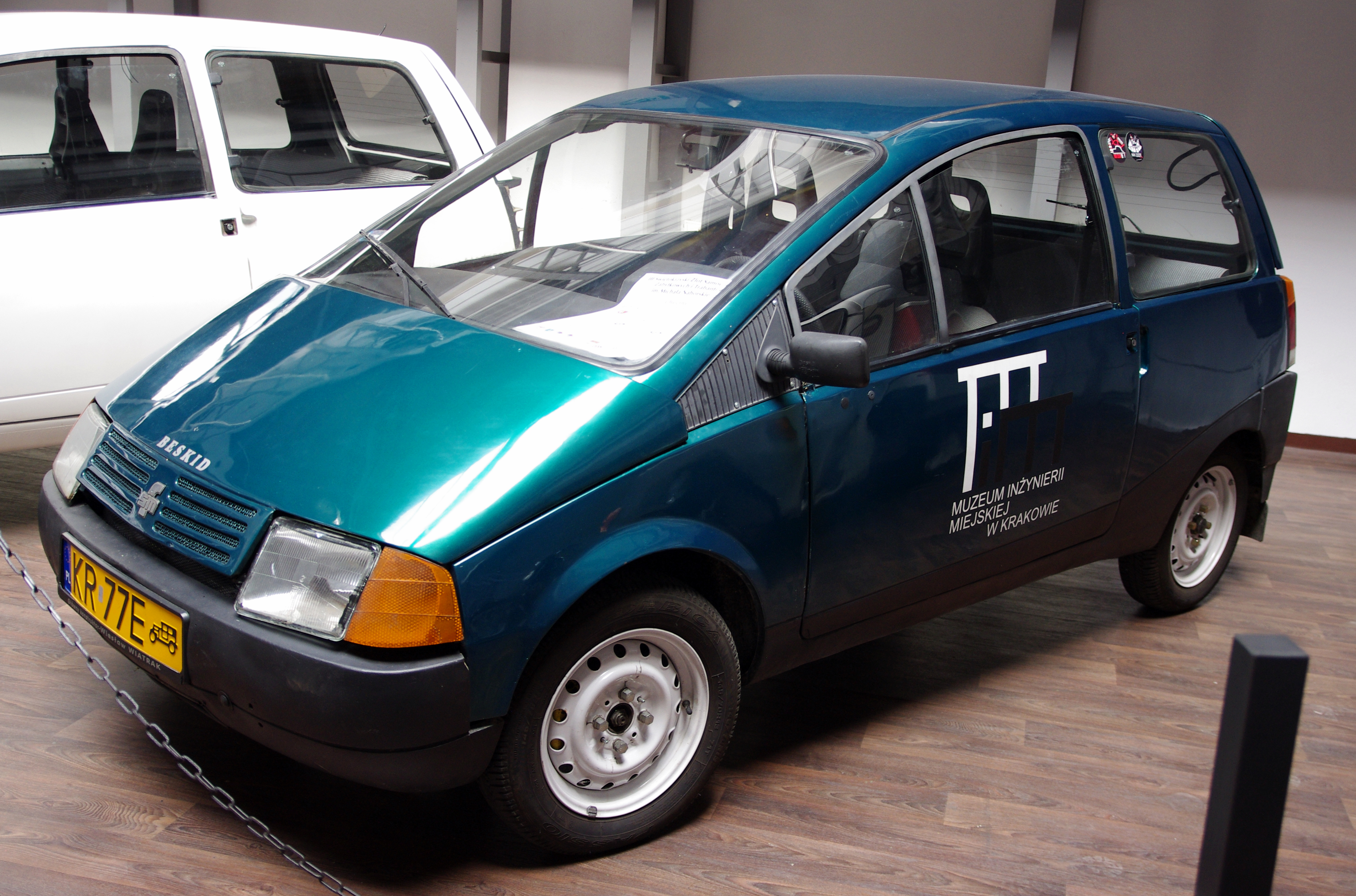
FSM Beskid (prototype)
