= FSO Syrena 110 =

Polish automobile prototype

Syrena 110
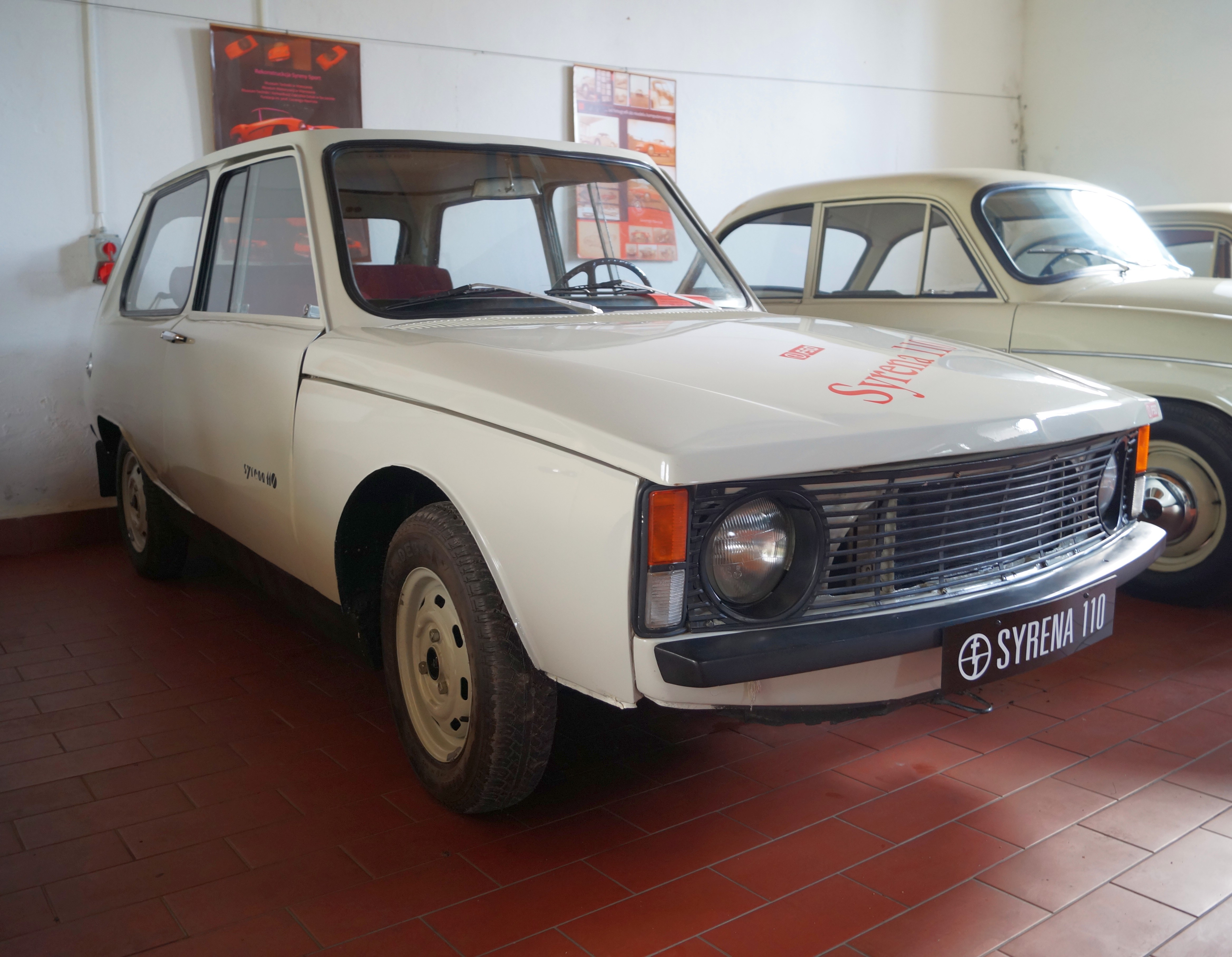

Overview
- Manufacturer: FSO
- Production: 1965–1966

Body and chassis
- Class: Compact car
- Body style: 3-door hatchback
- Layout: FF layout

Powertrain
- Engine: 842 cc two stroke straight-3
- Transmission: 4-speed manual

Dimensions
- Wheelbase: 2,400 mm (94 in)
- Length: 3,955 mm (155.7 in)
- Width: 1,530 mm (60 in)
- Height: 1,355 mm (53.3 in)
- Curb weight: 770 kg (1,700 lb)

Chronology
- Predecessor: Syrena 104

The Syrena 110 was a Polish automobile prototype from the mid-1960s, manufactured by the Fabryka Samochodów Osobowych (FSO) in Warsaw. It was one of the first hatchback in the world.

== History ==
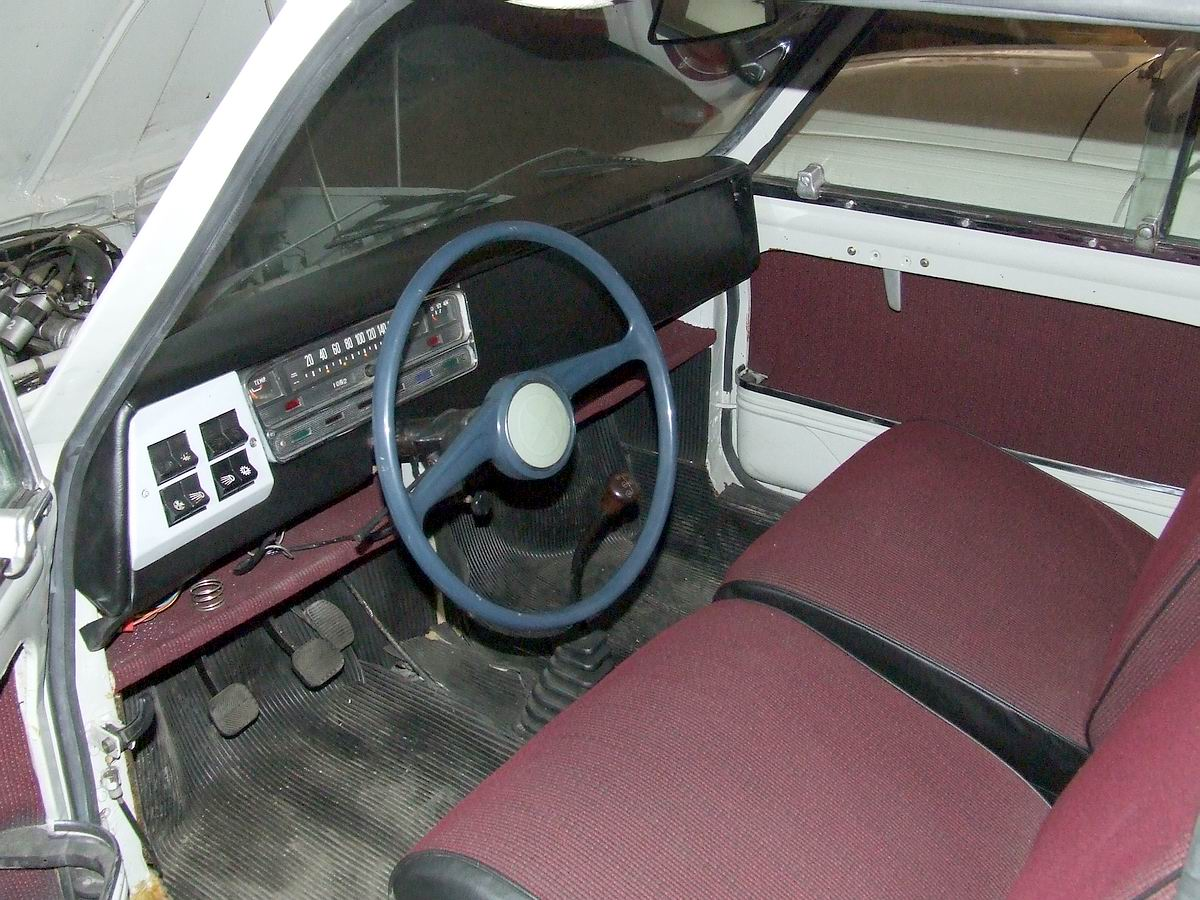
Interior

In 1961 there started works in the Automotive Industry Construction Bureau (Biuro Konstrukcyjne Przemysłu Motoryzacyjnego, BKPMot) upon a new small family car to replace the FSO Syrena, which was quite new at that time, but was not a modern design. There were built three prototypes, Alfa (rear drive), Beta and Delta (both front drive). At the same time, the Construction Bureau of the FSO factory worked upon a new model. In 1964 both teams merged their efforts. The new car was supposed to enter production in 1968.

The car was fitted with a most modern at that time angular-style three-door hatchback body (at the same time, as Renault 16). An interesting design feature was a partial frame in a forward part, enabling dismounting of the whole forward part with an engine. The engine was inherited from the newest Syrena 104 - S-31, 842 cc two stroke straight-3, but a four stroke engine was predicted in the future. A suspension was independent, with spiral springs.

In spite of a generally successful design, only a test batch of less than 20 Syrena 110 was manufactured in 1965-1966. The Syrena 110, that could become a modern and practical popular car, fell victim to a communist planned economy. In view of limited resources of the FSO factory, and neglecting needs for a popular mass-produced car, the Polish authorities decided to cease further works upon the Syrena 110, because of a license agreement to manufacture a mid-class Polski Fiat 125p. Only in the 1970s, after a political change, there appeared a much smaller popular car Polski Fiat 126p. A test batch of Syrena 110 were sold to private hands, and remained in use until the 1980s. At least two cars survived, one in the Motorization Museum in Warsaw (a division of Museum of Technology, Warsaw).

== Bibliography ==
- Zakrzewski, Adam (2010) (in Polish). Auto-moto PRL: władcy dróg i poboczy, Demart, Warsaw, ISBN 978-83-7427-484-5
