= Dąbrówka Grzybowska =

Neighbourhood of Warsaw, Poland

- Neighbourhood
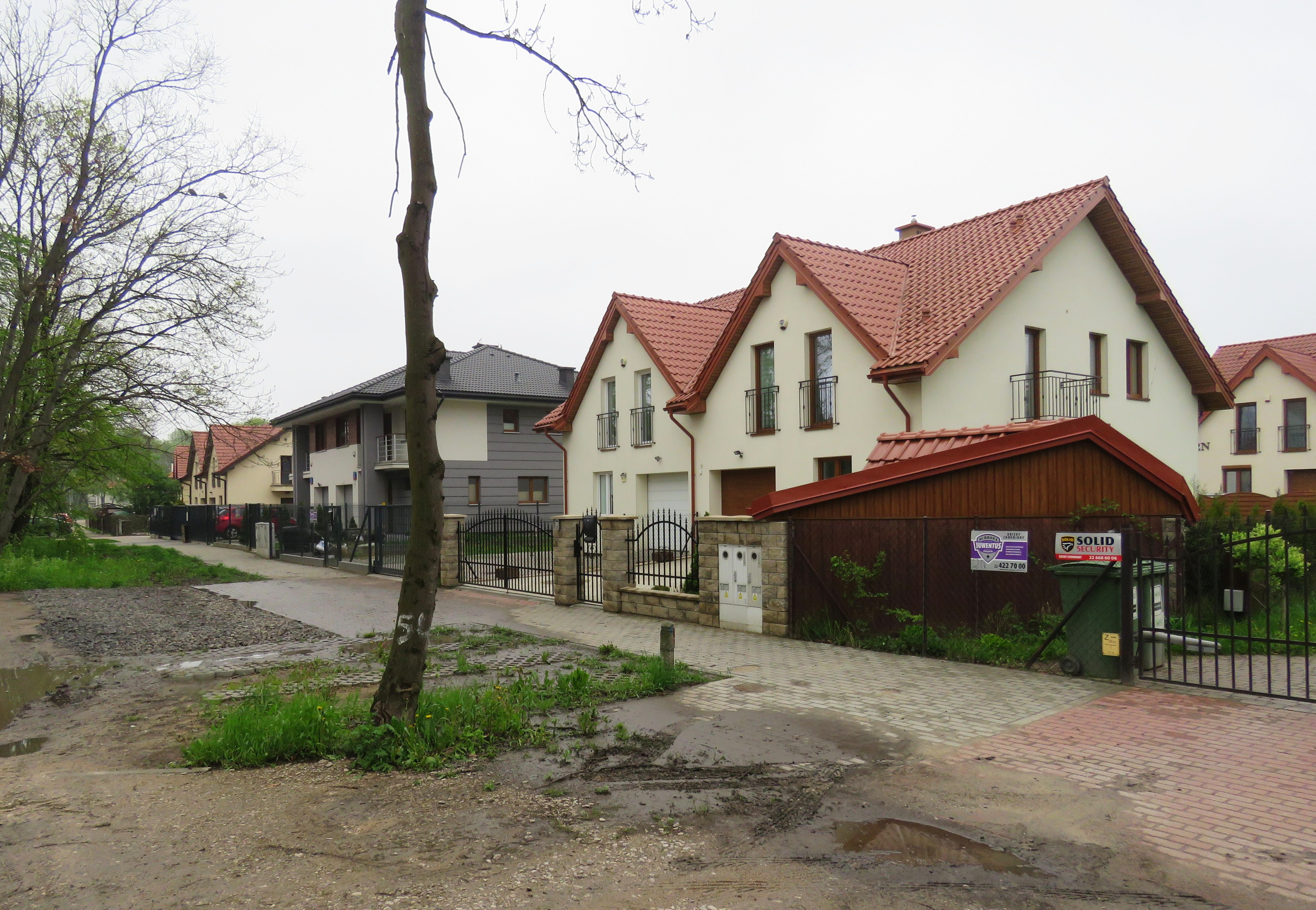
- Zyndrama z Maszkowic Street located in the neighbourhood of Dąbrówka Grzybowska, in 2017.
- Interactive map of Dąbrówka Grzybowska
- Coordinates: 52°19′45″N 20°59′22″E
- Country: Poland
- Voivodeship: Masovian Voivodeship
- City county: Warsaw
- District: Białołęka
- Municipal Information System area: Białołęka Dworska
- Time zone: UTC+1 (CET)
  - Summer (DST): UTC+2 (CEST)
- Area code: +48 22

Dąbrówka Grzybowska (Polish: [dɔmˈbruf.ka ɡʐɘ̟ˈbɔf.ska]) is a neighbourhood in the city of Warsaw, Poland, located within the district of Białołęka, in the Municipal Information System area of Białołęka Dworska.

== History ==
Dąbrówka Grzybowska was founded in 13th century, as a landed property of the local nobility, and between 16th century, it was a folwark-type settlement belonging to nearby Tarchomin.

In 20th century, Dąbrówka Grzybowska used to be a small village near the city of Warsaw. On 15 May 1951, it had been incorporated into Warsaw.
