= Fabryka Samochodów Osobowych =

Polish automobile parts manufacturer

Fabryka Samochodów Osobowych Spółka Akcyjna
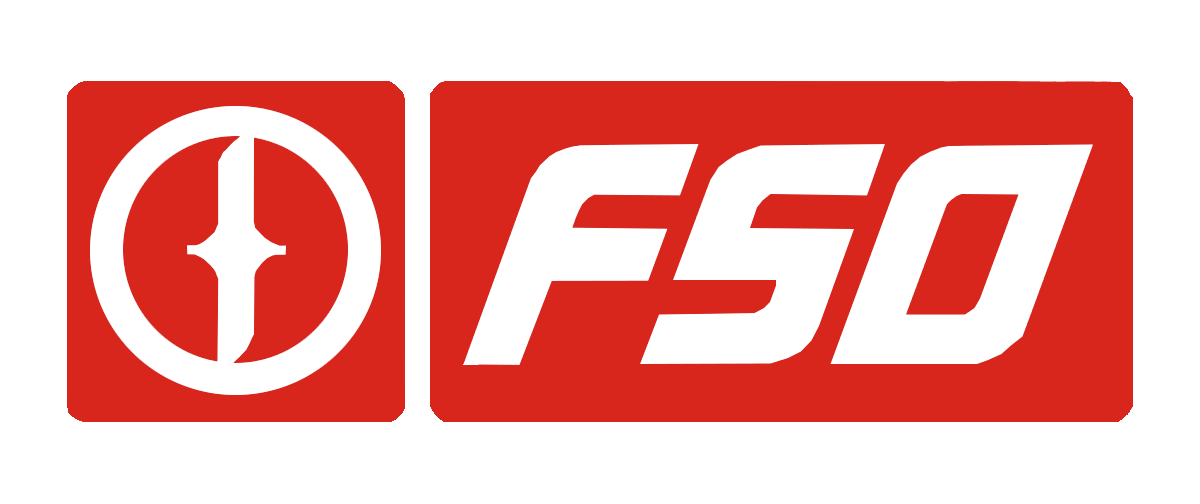

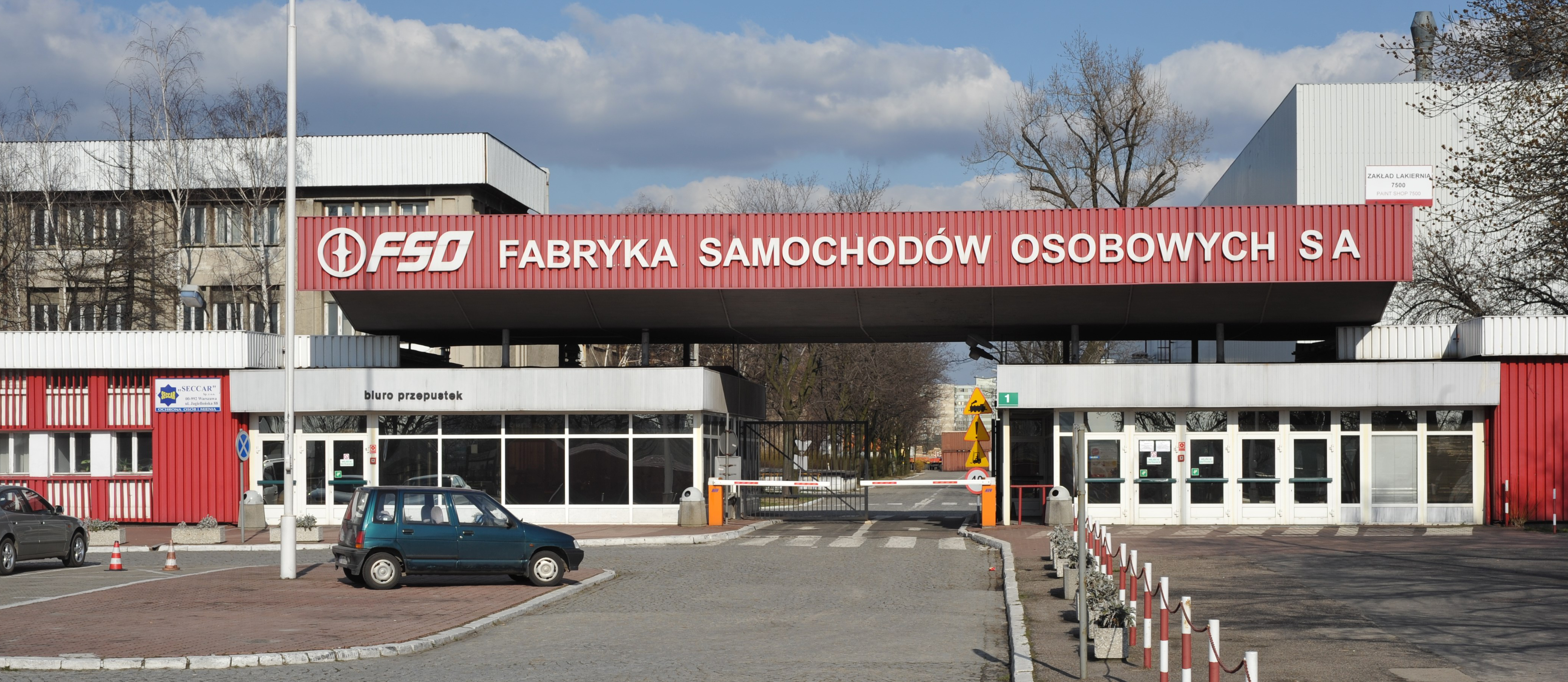
- FSO Factory
- Company type: Joint stock company
- Industry: Automotive
- Founded: July 31, 1948; 77 years ago
- Headquarters: Warsaw, Poland
- Area served: Worldwide
- Key people: Janusz Woźniak (Chairman)
- Products: Automobiles
- Revenue: ▲PLN 10.6 billion
- Operating income: ▲PLN 3.7 billion
- Net income: ▲PLN 4.3 billion
- Number of employees: 20 500 (1996)
- Website: fso-sa.com.pl

Fabryka Samochodów Osobowych (transl. Passenger Car Factory), commonly known as FSO, is a Polish automobile parts manufacturer, and formerly an automobile producer of historic significance, located in Warsaw.

In 2011, the factory ceased production amidst the backdrop of the global crisis, but directly as a result of GM Korea's refusal to prolong the factory's licence to produce the Aveo. GM claimed that one of the reasons for breaking the cooperation with FSO was the entry into force of the EU-South Korea Free Trade Agreement, which stipulated that import duties on cars imported from South Korea (then at 10%) were to be progressively eliminated. Since then, FSO has been producing automotive sub-assemblies.

== History ==
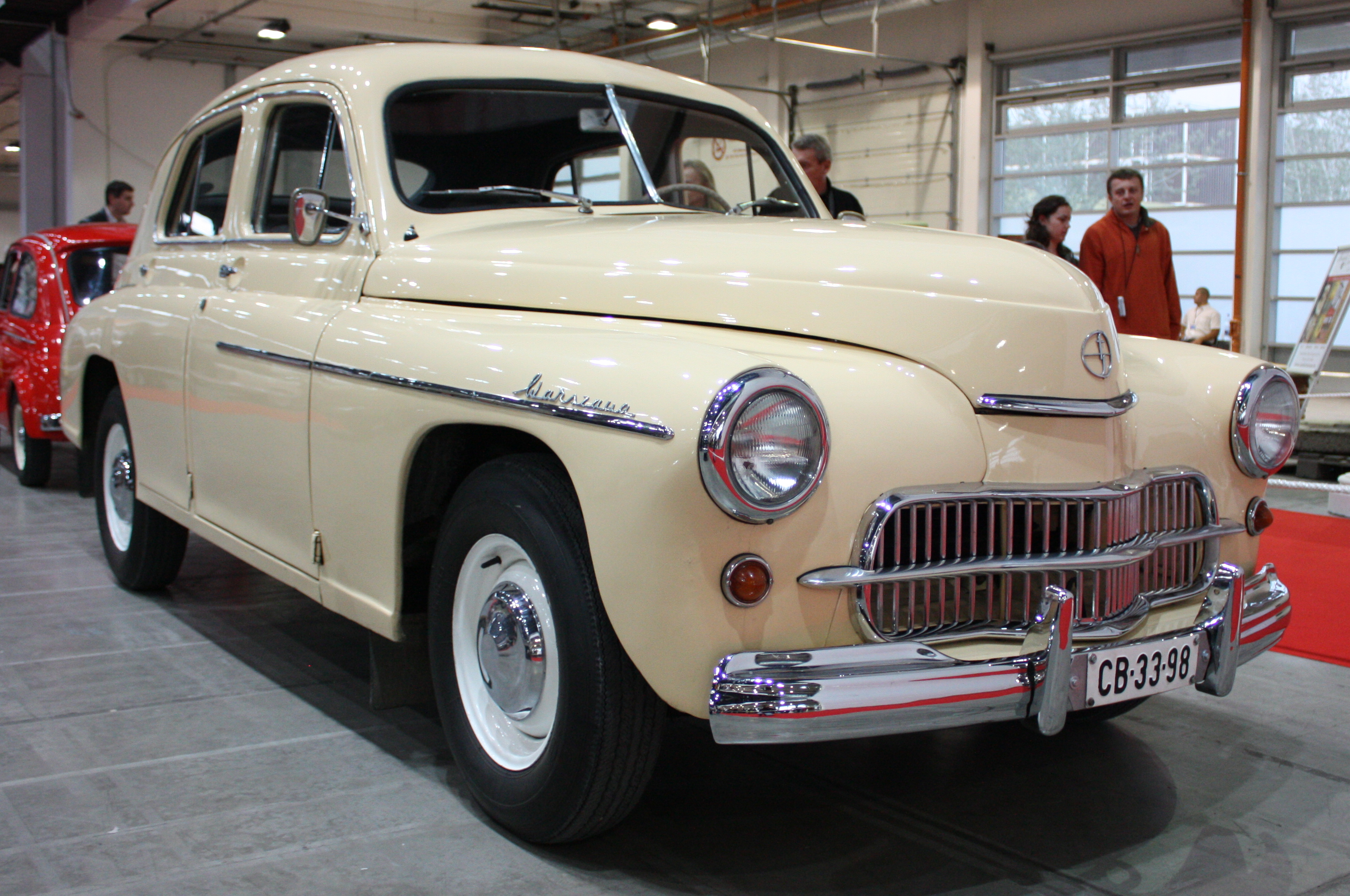
FSO Warszawa M20-57

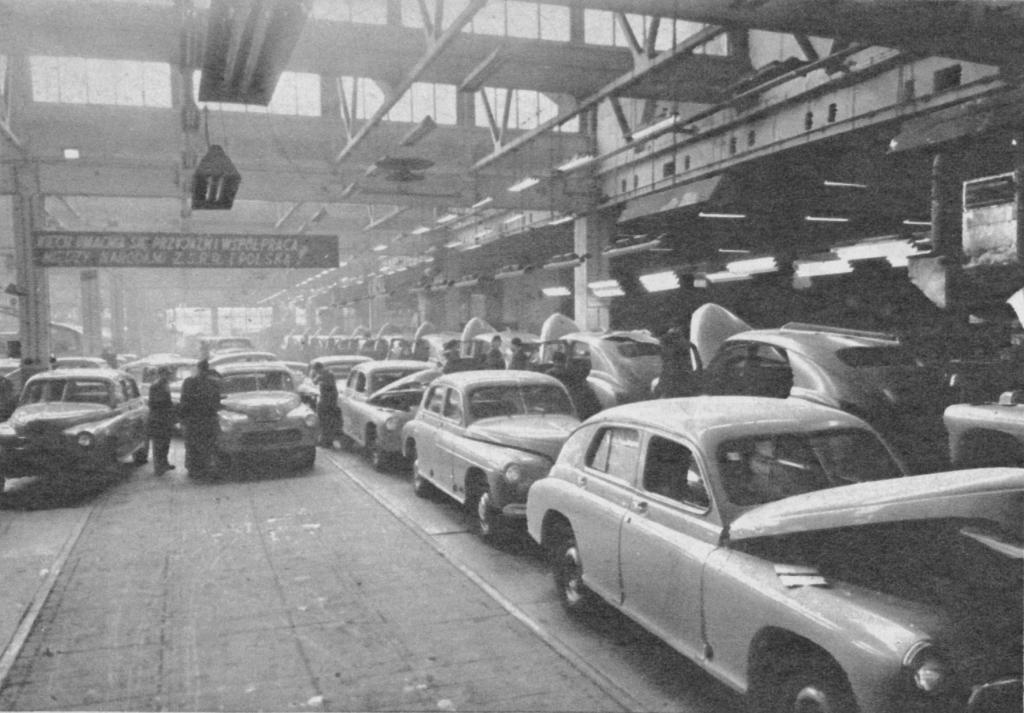
Warszawas assembled at FSO in the early 1950s

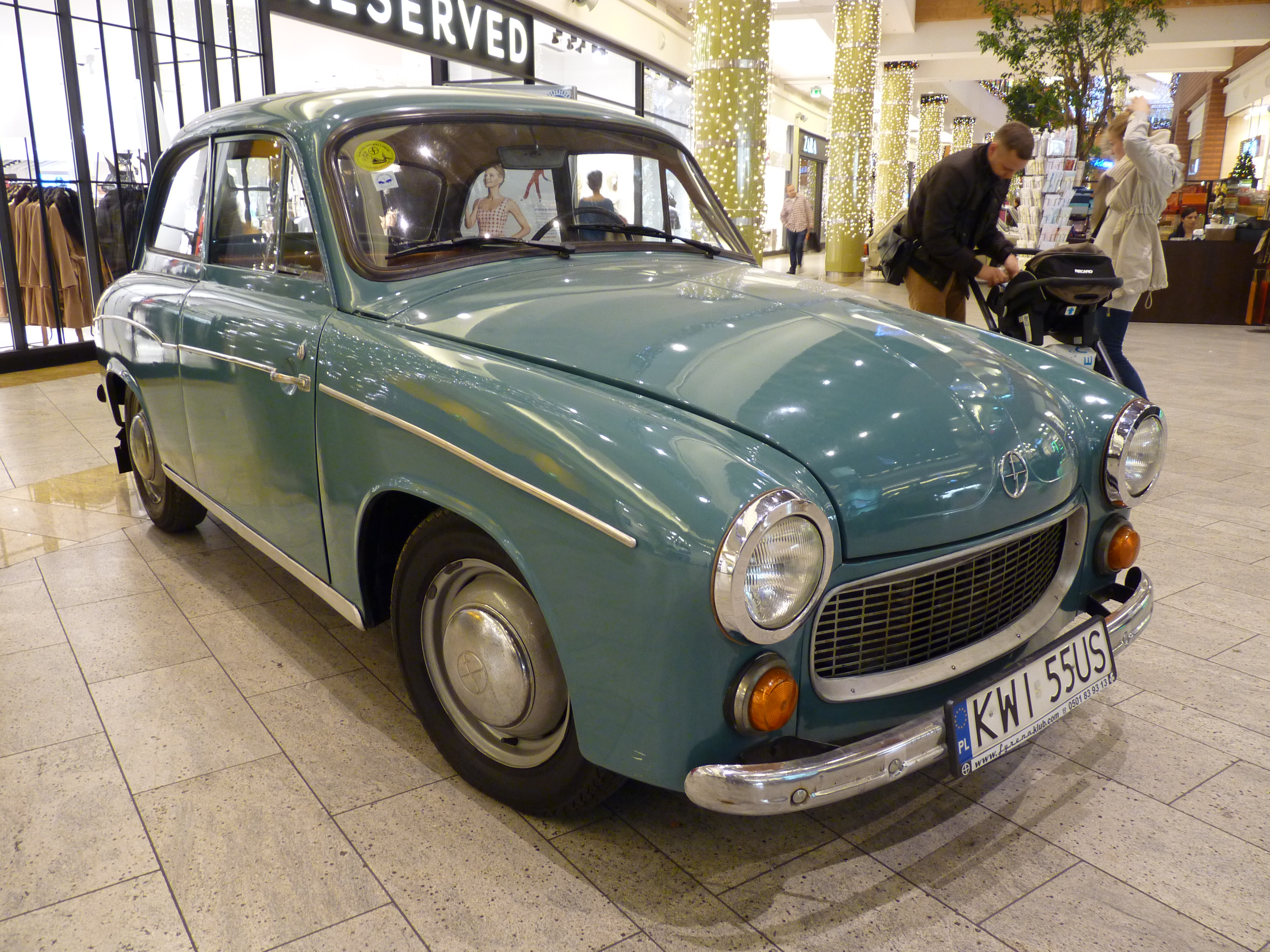
FSO Syrena 104

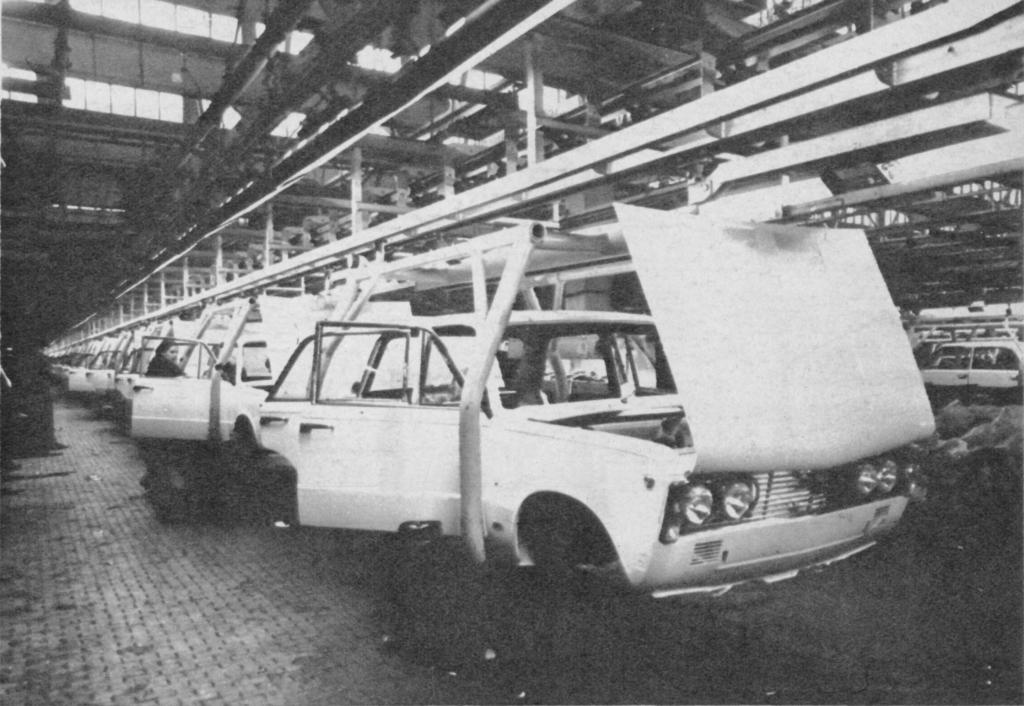
Polski Fiat 125p sedans assembled at FSO around 1974

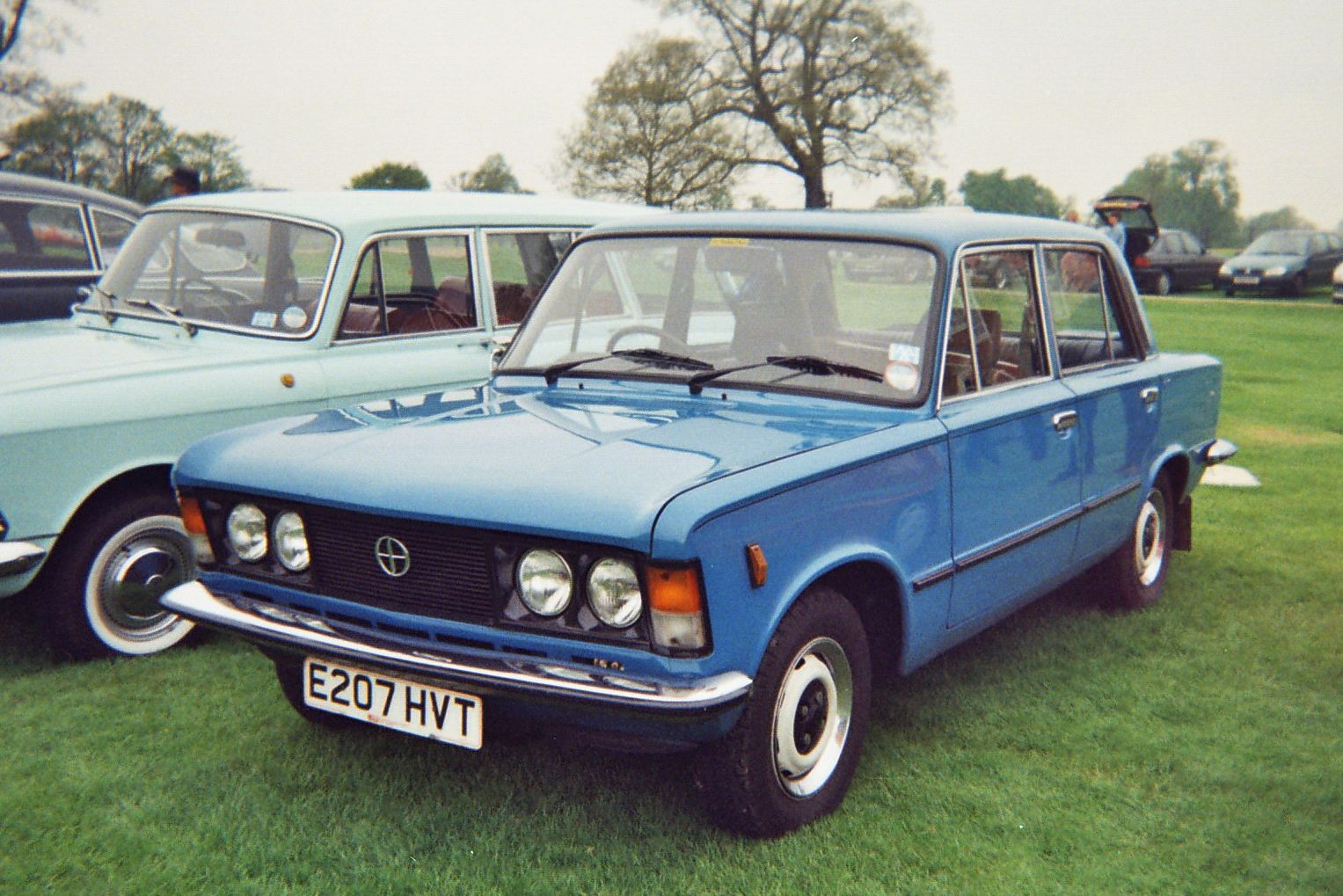
FSO 125p

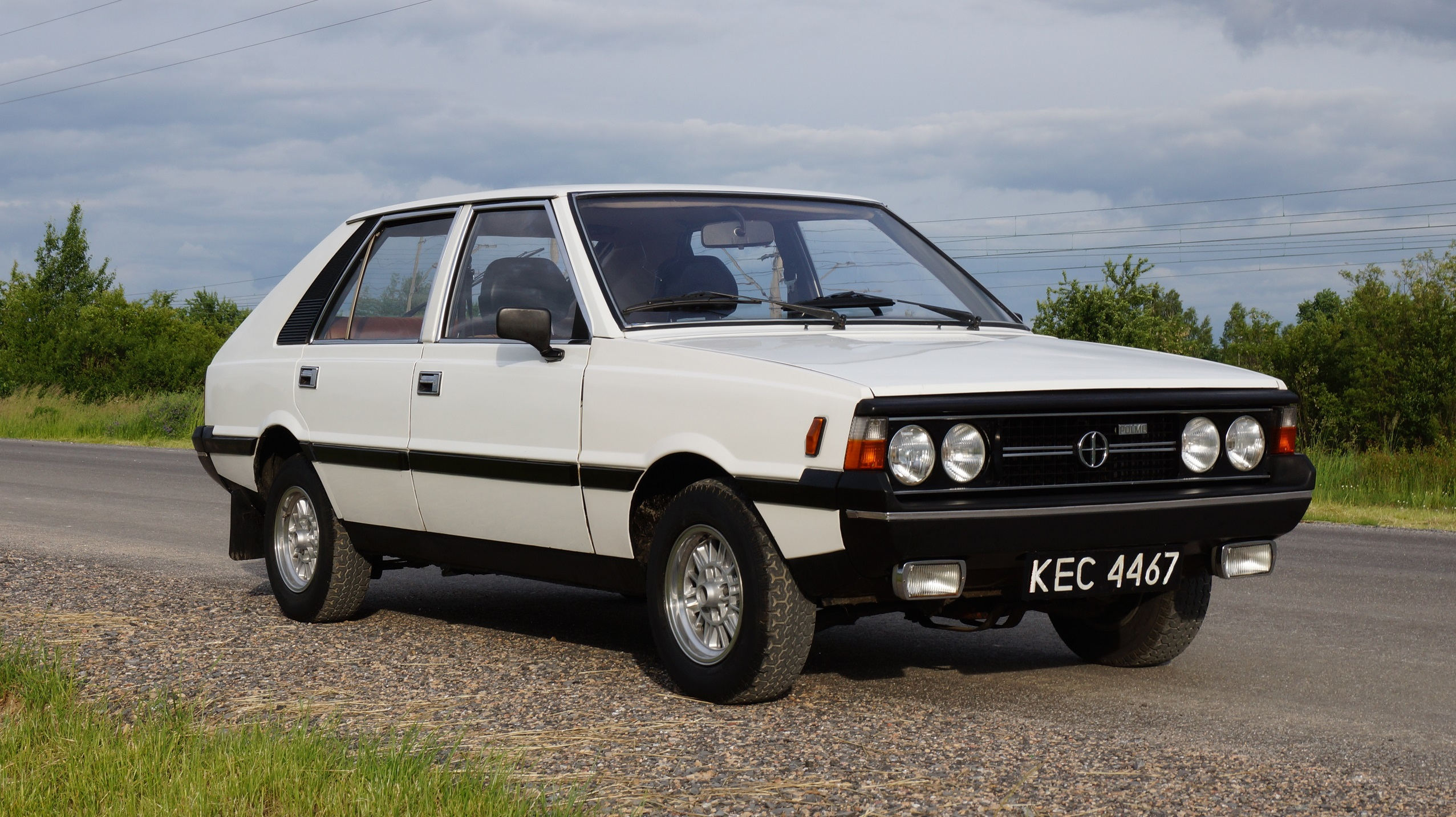
FSO Polonez (first generation of Polonez)

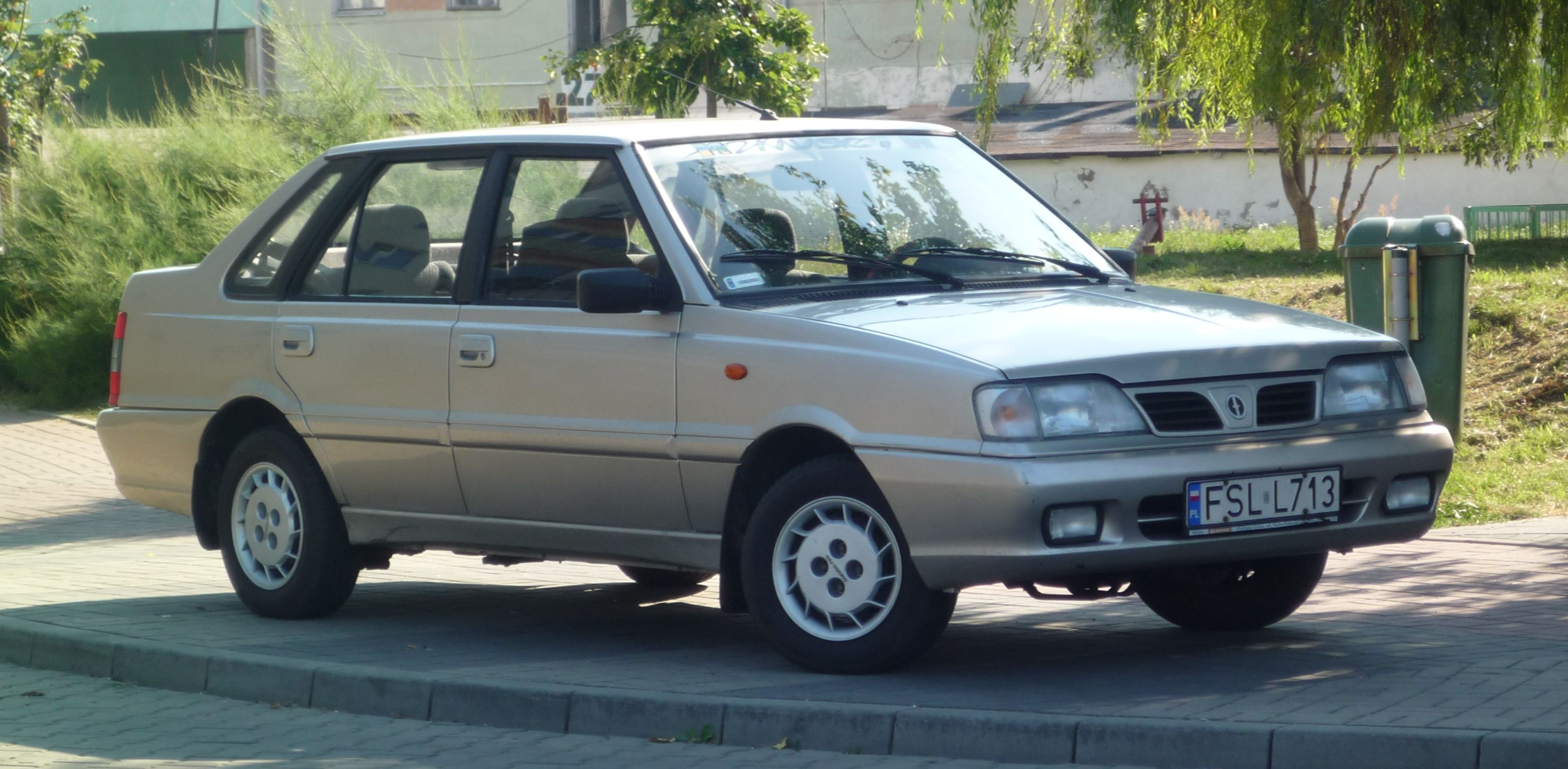
Daewoo-FSO Polonez Atu Plus (third generation)

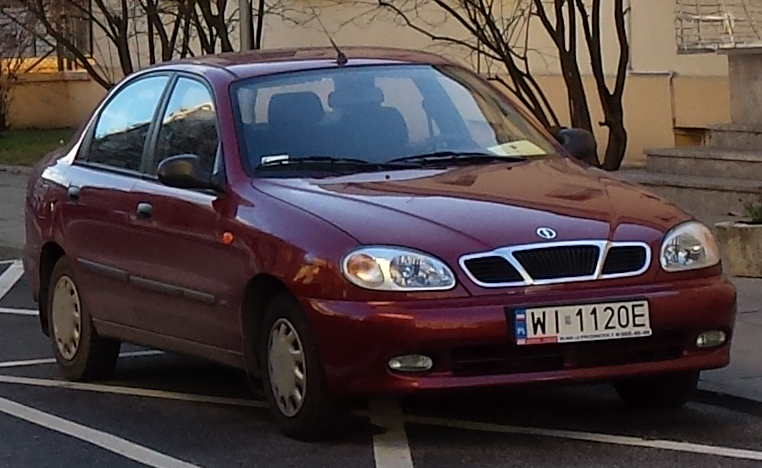
FSO Lanos

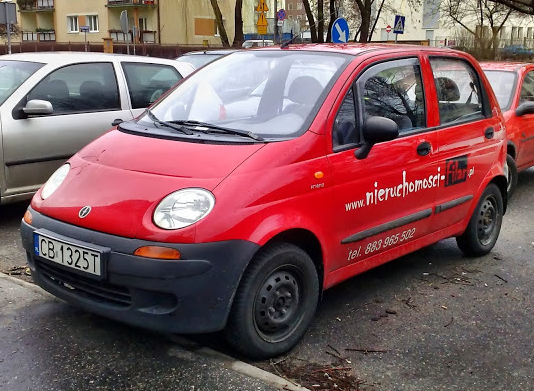
FSO Matiz

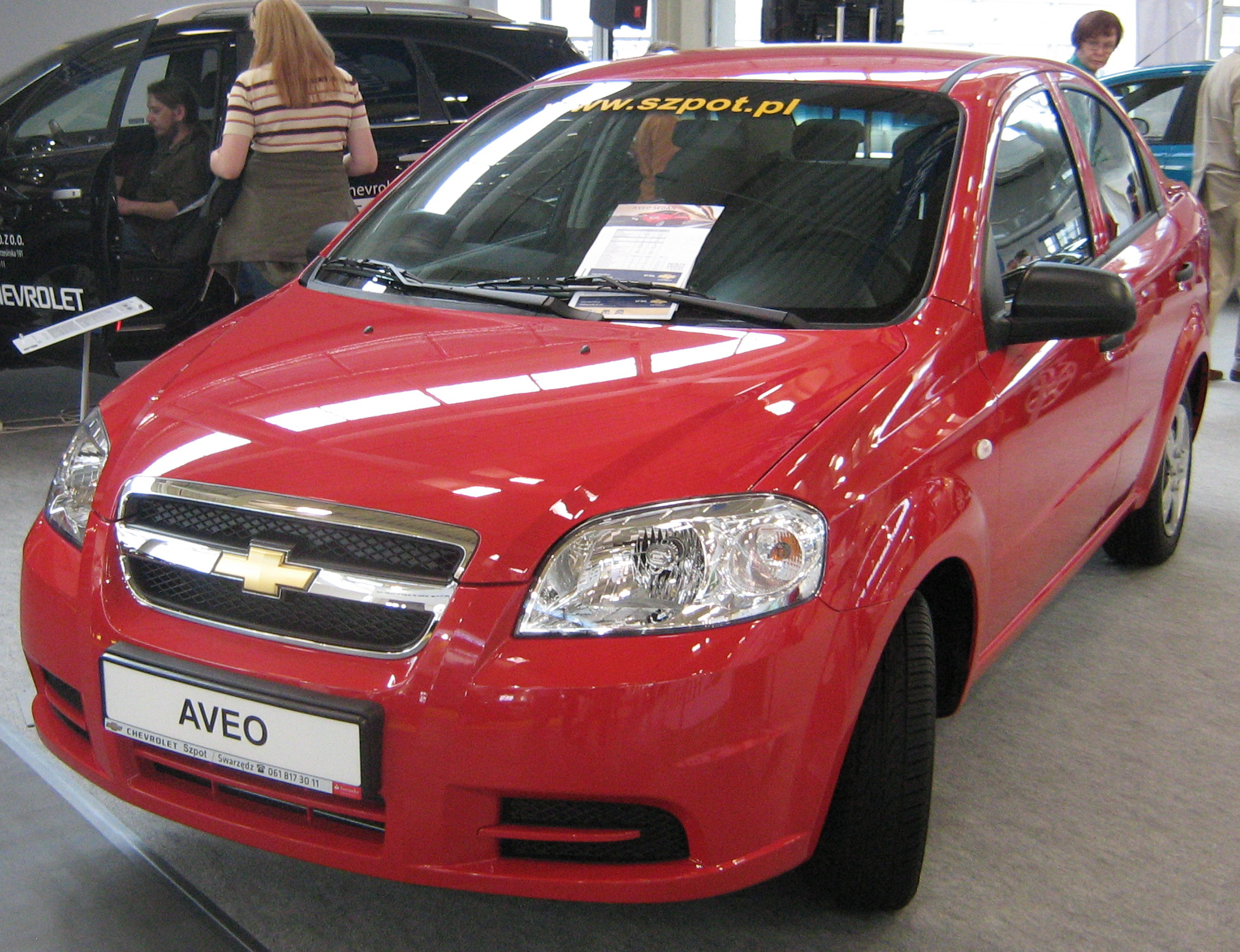
Chevrolet Aveo from FSO

The FSO plant was established in 1948 by the Communist Polish government in Żerań on Warsaw's eastern bank of the river Vistula, to produce automobiles for post World War II Poland. The first FSO car was the Warszawa which was essentially a Polish manufactured re-badge of the GAZ-M20 Pobeda, built under licence from the Soviets.

In 1953, an in-house team started development of a smaller and cheaper to manufacture car resulting in FSO's second model, the two-stroke Syrena. The Syrena, introduced in 1957, was a proprietary design of FSO; and its production was moved to the FSM car factory (Fabryka Samochodów Małolitrażowych).

=== 125p and Polonez era ===
In 1965, the Polish government signed licensing agreements with the Italian auto manufacturer Fiat to manufacture select Fiat models in Poland, under the brand of Polski Fiat. In particular, the Fiat 125 was to be manufactured at FSO to replace the outdated Warszawa. The resulting model, called Polski Fiat 125p, was in fact a simplified version of the Italian 125 with Fiat 1300/1500 mechanicals, and was exported for some time as the Fiat 125p. After the licensing agreement had ended, it was rebranded as the FSO 1300/1500. It was also produced in estate (station wagon) and pick-up variants. Meanwhile, the Warszawa was manufactured concurrently until 1973.

In 1978, FSO introduced a new model called the Polonez, a 5-door compact car based on the updated FSO 1500 design. The Polonez was also exported to many markets under the FSO brand. This model was to initially substitute all variants of the original 1500, but in actuality the production of the latter continued all the way until 1991. Both models were updated and revised multiple times during their production period.

The Polski Fiat 125p production ended on 26 June, 1991. In total, 1,445,689 were manufactured. By that time, the design was 24 years old and used mechanicals which were essentially 30 years old, with only minor improvements.

=== Daewoo era ===
After the end of the Cold War, the Iron Curtain, the Fall of Communism in Poland, and with the Warsaw Pact Eastern Europe in 1989, the Polish government sought to privatize FSO by establishing a partnership with an international automaker to secure its future. Despite many attempts and negotiations, this was not the case for many years. The first full-fledged venture started in 1994, when an agreement with General Motors was signed to assemble Opel Astra in Żerań. Nevertheless, the following year FSO was sold to the Korean Daewoo Motors, which was a competitor to GM at that time. The company was then renamed Daewoo-FSO.

At first, Daewoo used FSO to assemble models such as Daewoo Tico, Daewoo Nexia and Daewoo Espero. In 1997, the assembly and then full-fledged production of the Daewoo Lanos commenced, followed in 1999 by the Daewoo Matiz. Other contemporary Daewoo models like the Nubira, the Leganza, the Korando, the Musso and the Chairman were also assembled. The production of the Polonez was continued, the model was modernized, and new body styles were added. Shrinking market demand led FSO to cease Polonez production in 2002.

Meanwhile, in 1998, General Motors decided to build their own factory in Gliwice, and relocated the production of the Opel Astra to this facility. GM's assembly line at FSO was used for a short period to assemble the Opel Vectra for the Polish market and then shut down completely, ending the relationship with General Motors.

=== Post-Daewoo FSO ===
Daewoo went bankrupt in 2000 leading to an acute deterioration of FSO's position in the industry. Daewoo Motors was bought out by General Motors (and its Asian partners), but overseas manufacturing subsidiaries such as Daewoo-FSO were not part of the deal. Therefore, FSO became de facto independent again.

Through lengthy negotiations, the Polish government secured FSO the rights to manufacture and sell the Lanos and the Matiz until 2007. Nevertheless, FSO did not have the means to update the models, so they quickly became less and less attractive. Additionally, Daewoo's collapse caused buyers to become wary of Daewoo cars. FSO found salvation in the Ukrainian market, where Matiz and Lanos, assembled by the local partner AvtoZAZ, became very popular. In 2004, Daewoo-FSO was renamed FSO again.

During this period, the Polish government was actively seeking a new strategic partner for FSO, but no major automaker expressed interest. Finally, FSO entered talks with the British MG Rover, but as talks progressed it became apparent that the British company did not have the means to complete the deal despite suggestions of the involvement of an (alternating) Chinese partner. MG Rover went into administration in 2005, putting an end to any hopes connected with it.

Consequently, the UkrAVTO, the owner of ZAZ, became the only possible partner for FSO. The Ukrainian company gradually became a majority shareholder of FSO (84.31% of shares), while at the same time strengthening the cooperation between FSO and ZAZ. UkrAVTO suggested it would provide a new model for FSO to manufacture after the Matiz and Lanos licences had expired.

In mid-2006, the parent company of FSO, UkrAVTO, signed a licence agreement with General Motors to produce the Chevrolet Aveo (T250) saloon, and since July 2008, the 3 and 5-door hatchback. For the production of the Aveo a new company was formed, whose shareholders were FSO (60%) and GM (40%); FSO provided the plant, while GM provided the finances. The first Aveo rolled off the FSO plant on 11 July 2007.

The 100,000th Aveo rolled off the assembly lines on February 1, 2011. The licence for the production of Aveo expired in February 2011 and it was not resumed for the next generation model. By March 2011 more than 1,800 employees were made redundant and the land on which the factory was built was offered for sale.

Despite the sale of some of the assets, the company's authorities declared their willingness to start production within a few months of signing the contract with a potential investor, announcing the possibility of achieving the plant's performance of 250,000 cars a year. In August 2014, the president of FSO in an interview assured that despite the lack of production, the company's condition was good and it did not have debt, and even made a profit. The FSO capital group diversified its activities by producing exhaust systems, MacPherson struts, fuel tanks, car electrical beams, fences, lamps, Lego blocks, subassemblies for household appliances, the group also sold and serviced cars and rented production halls and office spaces. In 2017, the Public Prosecutor's Office of the Republic of Poland, acting on behalf of the Treasury, filed a complaint with AvtoZAZ for failure to fulfil its obligations under the share purchase agreement. The State Treasury is seeking compensation from the Ukrainian company in the amount of PLN 250 million. AvtoZAZ considered the accusations made against them unfounded.

== Production history ==
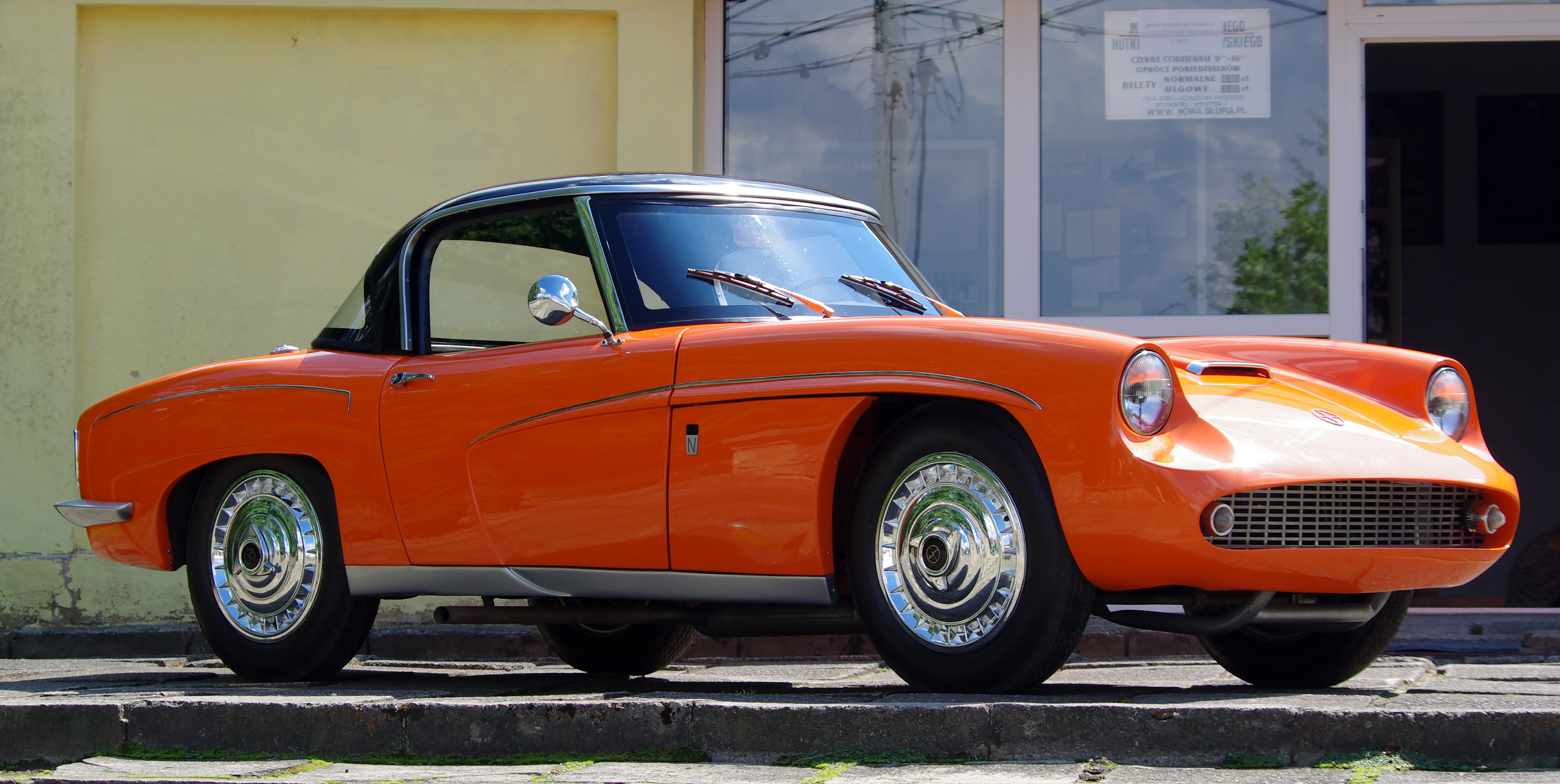
FSO Syrena Sport, 1960 (replica)

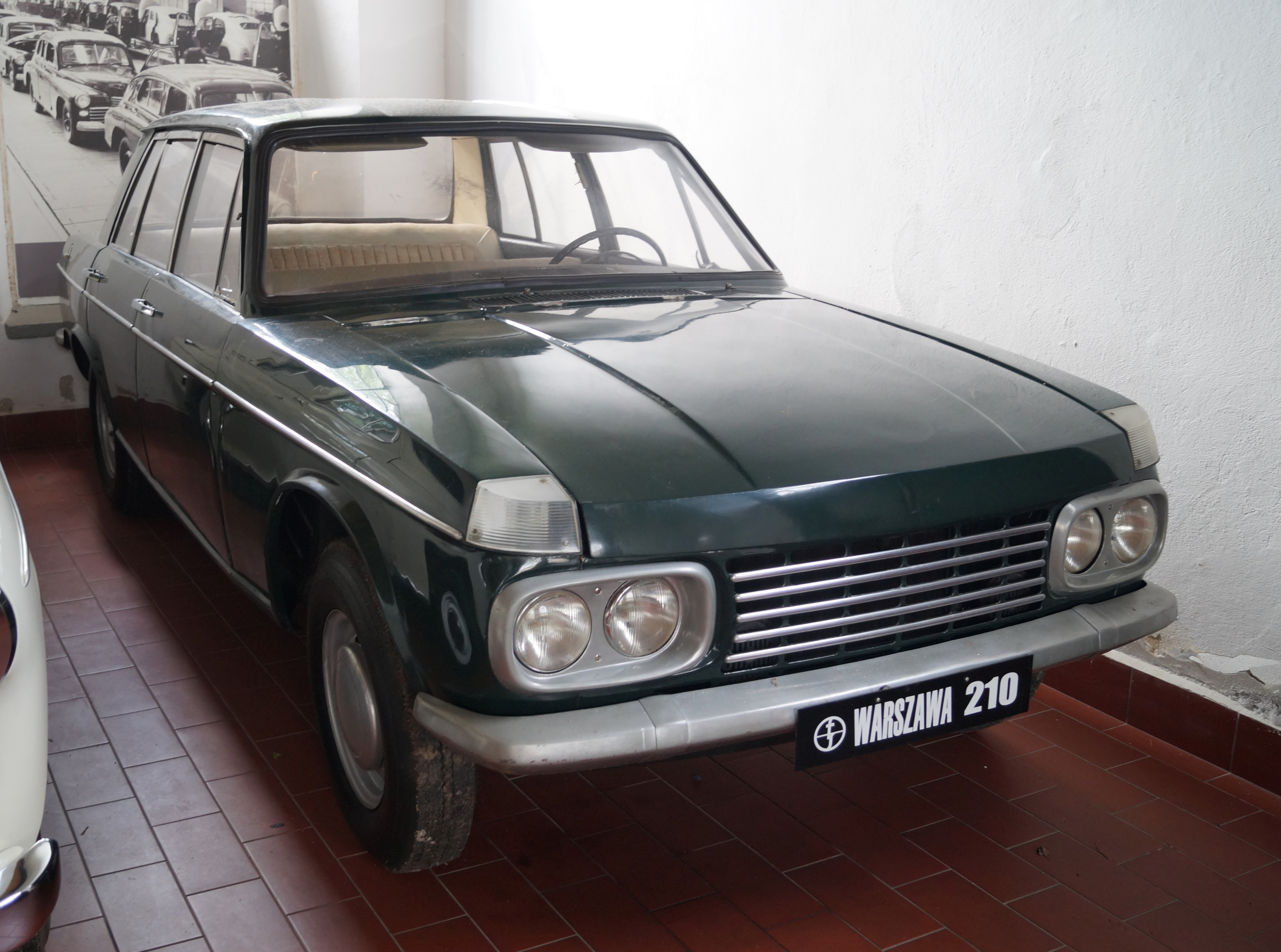
FSO Warszawa 210, 1964

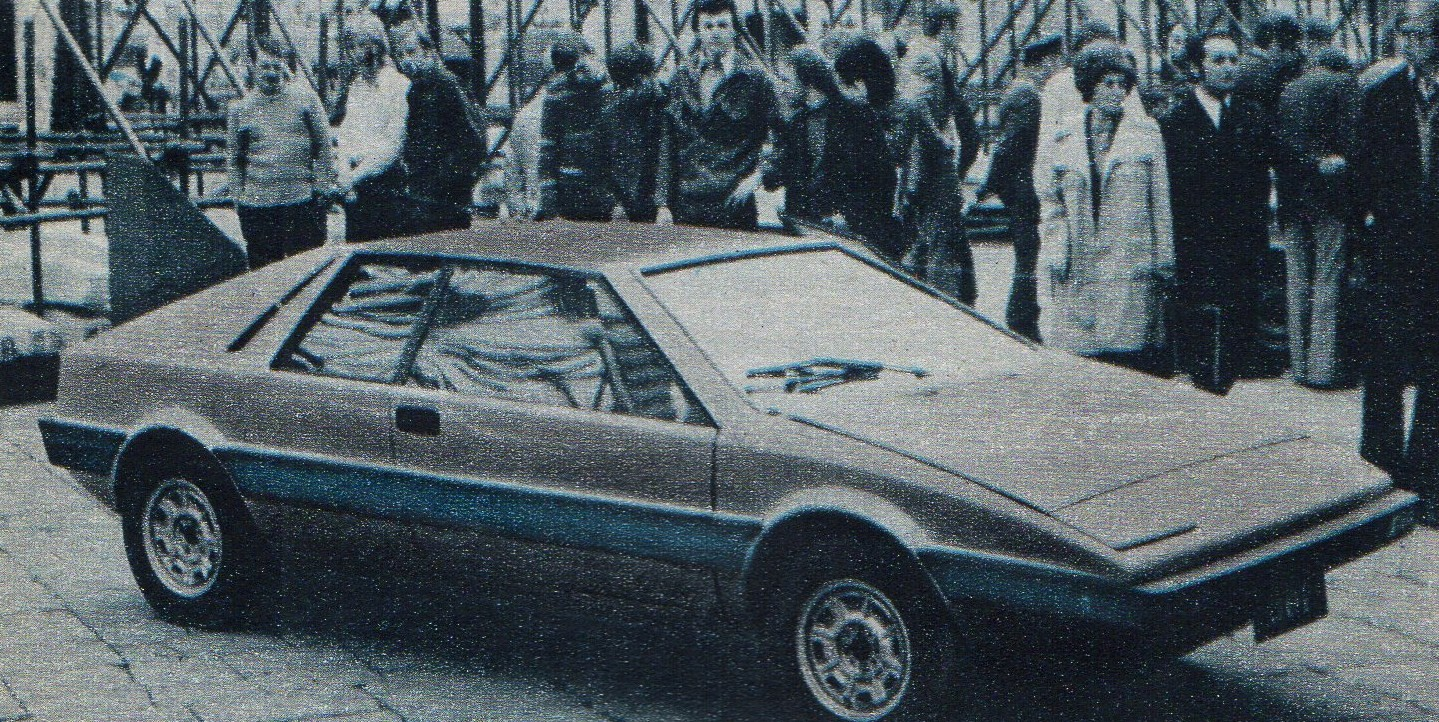
FSO 1300 Coupé, 1974

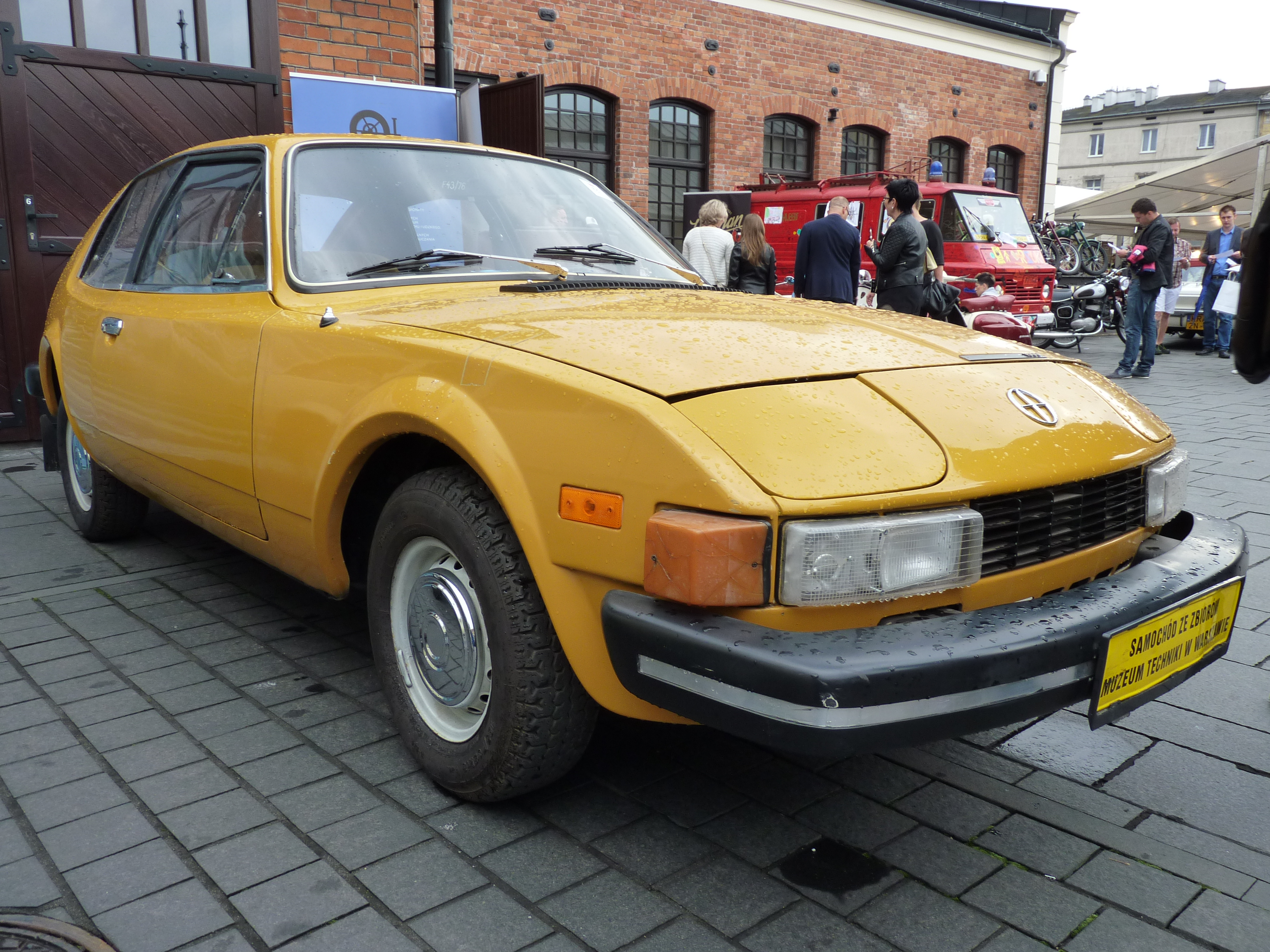
FSO Ogar, 1977

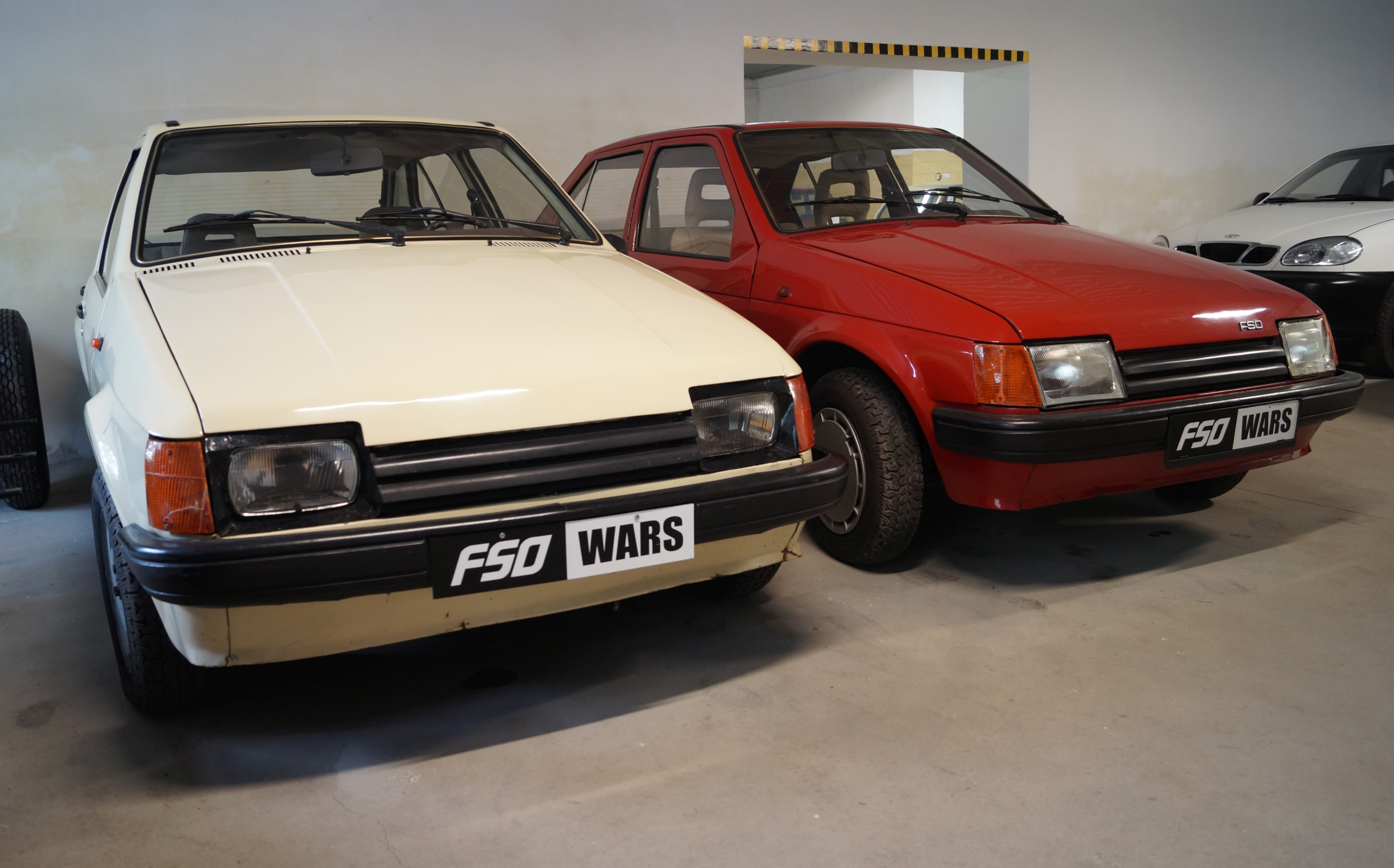
FSO Wars, 1985

- 1951-1973 Warszawa 254,471
- 1952-1972 Syrena 177,234
- 1967-1991 Polski Fiat 125p 125p/FSO 1,445,699
- 1978-2003 Polonez 1,061,807
- 1996-2001 Daewoo Tico 126,369
- 1996-1999 Daewoo Espero 20,573
- 1997-2003 Daewoo Nubira 33,116
- 1997-2001 Daewoo Leganza 3,969
- 1998-2007 Daewoo Matiz / FSO Matiz 152,363
- 2000-2001 Daewoo Tacuma 427
- 2004-2008 Daewoo Lanos / FSO Lanos 461,655
- 2007-2011 Chevrolet Aveo 126,622
- Cars assembled in FSO 73,376
- Special-12,800

=== Concepts and prototypes ===
- 1959 – Syrena Mikrobus van concept, the first minivan
- 1960 – creation of Syrena Sport, one of the few Polish post-war sports concept cars
- 1961 – Syrena laminate prototypes, the modern successor of Syrena 104
- 1964 – Warszawa 210 prototype
- 1966 – Syrena 110 prototypes, one of the first hatchbacks in the world
- 1971 – Polski Fiat 125p Coupe concept
- 1974 – FSO 1100 Coupe concept
- 1974 – Polski Fiat 125p convertible
- 1977 – Ogar, sports car
- 1981 – Polonez Pick-up 3-axis, with center-wheel drive
- 1982 – Polonez Sedan, based on the 1300/1500
- 1982 – Polonez Long, 7-door saloon derived from the Polonez
- 1985 – Wars, a modern family car
- 1994 – FSO Polonez Analog, 4×4 car
