= Żerań =

Suburb in Poland

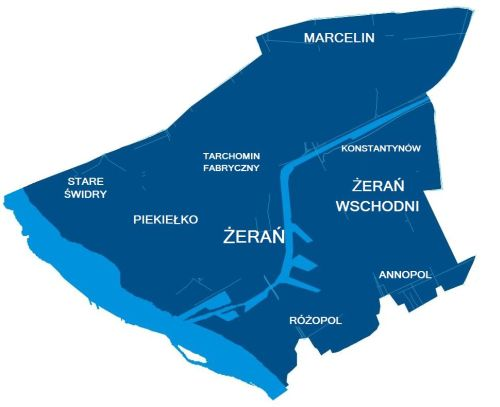
Map of Żerań

Żerań is a northern suburb of Warsaw, Poland, situated in the Białołęka district. It is noted for the Żerań Power Station. The area borders with the Vistula River, the Praga-Północ district and the Tarchomin, Różopol, Konstantynów and Annopol housing estates.

== History ==
Żerań was first mentioned in the fourteenth century. The name comes from the old Polish terms "żyr" or "żer" and means "pasture in the forest".

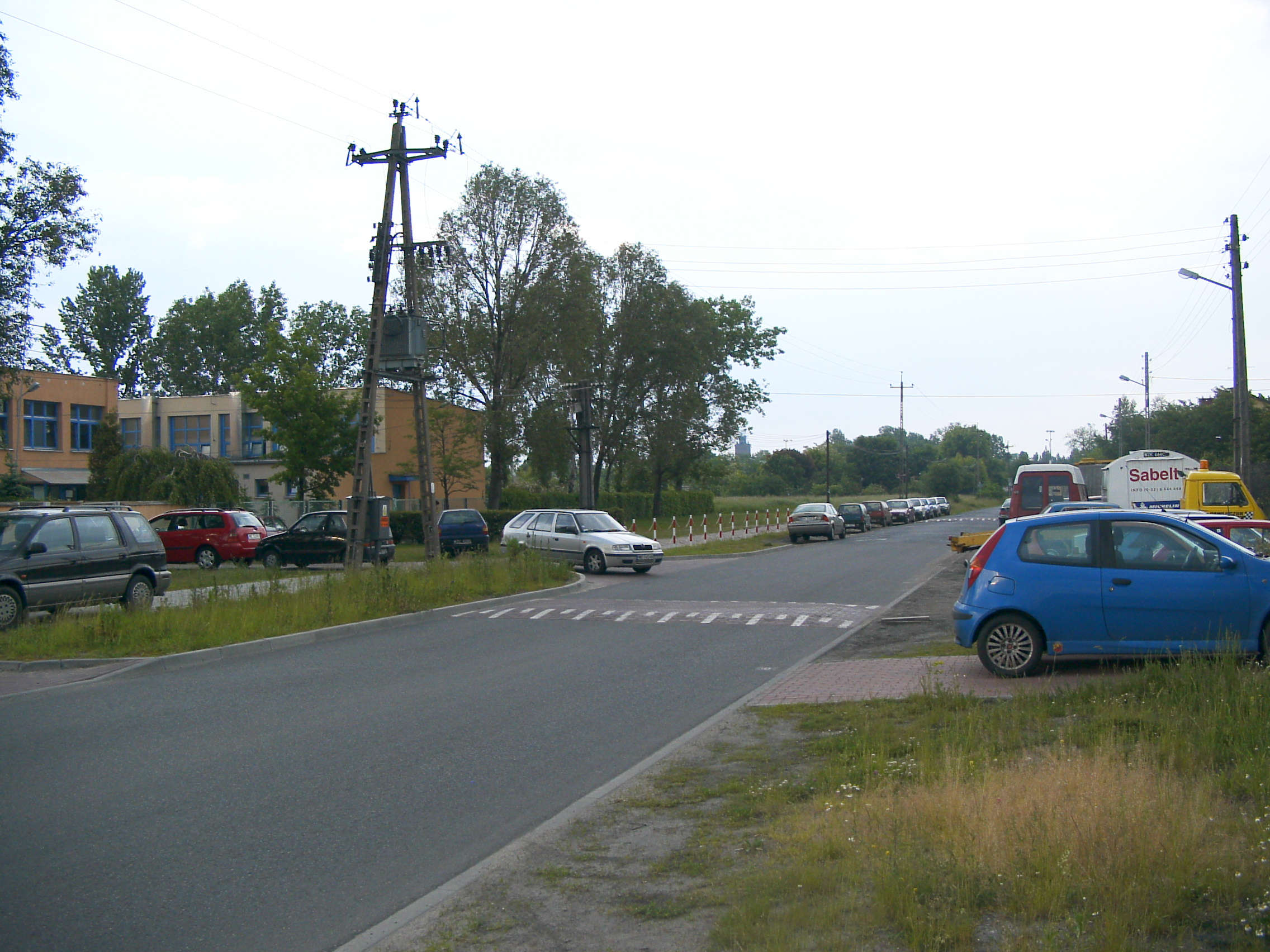
Płużnicka Street, Piekiełko

In the western side of Żerań is the housing estate Piekiełko at 52°18′32″N 20°58′42″E, which includes the Kasztanowa, Płużnicka and Ekspresowa streets. It was founded in the second half of the 19th century along the present Modlińska Street. By 1887, 51 houses were erected here. 58 people were recorded in the 1912 census. The Jabłonowska Railway, which ran to Jabłonna in 1900–1956 (with breaks in 1939 and 1944) contributed to the development of the settlement. The railway was instrumental in transporting goods from the Spiess chemical (later pharmaceutical) factory in Tarchomin (now Polfa Tarchomin SA) and the chemical factory "Winnica" in Henryków. During the German occupation, a Jewish labor camp operated in Piekiełka. It was liquidated in November 1942. Piekiełko was annexed to Warsaw together with other neighboring villages in 1951.

== Economy ==
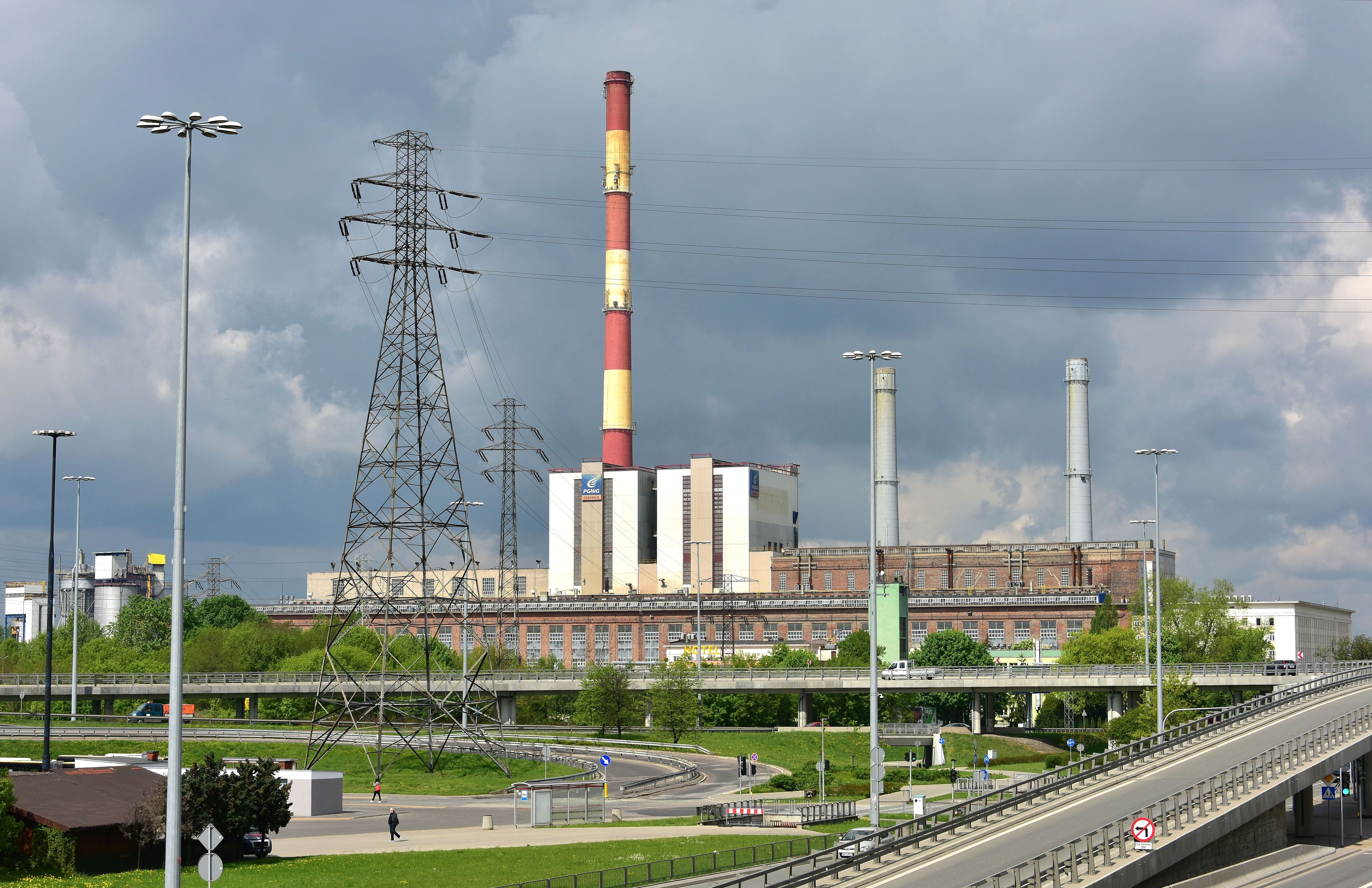
Żerań Power Station

The Żerań estate mainly has industrial functions. It contains a power plant, which began operations in 1954, a furnace waste dump, numerous office buildings and warehouses, a glass hardening factory, manufacturer H + H Poland, and the Żerański Canal and port. During the People's Republic of Poland, the Faelbe Concrete Element Factory operated in Żerań.
