= Piotr Szulczewski =

CEO of Wish.com

Peter Szulczewski
- Born: Piotr Szulczewski; 1981 (age 44–45); Warsaw, Warsaw Capital Voivodeship, Poland
- Education: University of Waterloo
- Years active: 2009-present
- Known for: ContextLogic, Wish

Piotr Szulczewski (pronounced [ˈpjɔtr ʂulˈt͡ʂɛfskʲi]; born 1981) is a Canadian-Polish businessman and computer engineer who is the founder and former CEO of the mobile-first ecommerce platform focused on low-cost goods, Wish.com. In 2019, he became the youngest billionaire from Canada according to Forbes, though his net worth subsequently declined following Wish's public offering.

== Early life and background ==
Szulczewski grew up in the Warsaw neighbourhood of Tarchomin. Upon the collapse of the communism in Poland, his parents immigrated to Waterloo, Ontario, Canada, about 70 miles (110 km) west of Toronto. He studied mathematics and computer science at the University of Waterloo, where he met Danny Zhang.

Just before graduating from the University of Waterloo in 2004 at the age of 23, Szulczewski relocated to Palo Alto, California and did a four-month coding internship for Google. He then became a full-time employee for Google, where he wrote the prototype algorithms for keyword expansion, a feature which aids in searching for products from advertisers.

== Career ==
In June 2007, Szulczewski moved to South Korea to work in the new Google office. The Korean market demanded more detailed search portals than the minimalist ones used by Google in the West, and effectively trained Szulczewski in how to cater for the public.

In 2009, he saved enough money to leave Google and spent six months at home writing code for an ads recommendation platform that analyzed at a person's browsing behaviors to predict their interests. He set up a software company, ContextLogic, that in September 2010 received $1.7 million in investments and involved Yelp CEO Jeremy Stoppelman. Jerry Yang, the cofounder of Yahoo! and an investor in Wish through his angel fund, AME Cloud Ventures, recalls that Szulczewski was highly ambitious. In May 2011, Szulczewski invited his old friend Danny Zhang, then at Yellowpages.com to join the new business as a cofounder and they relaunched the company as Wishwall.me. Facebook learned of the new technology and offered $20 million for ContextLogic but Szulczewski refused the offer. Szulczewski states that with Wish.com his primary aim is to create "the largest, most convenient and most affordable shopping mall in the world" and to target low-income households. By 2016 Wish.com had over 5 million daily visitors.

In 2016, Szulczewski was listed at #21 on America's Richest Entrepreneurs Under 40 list and in 2019, #1605 on Forbes's list of billionaires. In 2019 he was cited as the 34th wealthiest person and youngest billionaire from Canada, and the 5th wealthiest Polish billionaire. Despite his success, he stays out of the spotlight and rarely gives interviews. He was interviewed for the first time by the Polish media in November 2017.

In November 2021, it was announced that Szulczewski would be stepping down as Chief Executive Officer. On January 31, 2022, Vijay Talwar was named as Chief Executive Officer and a member of Wish’s Board of Directors, effective February 1, 2022. Szulczewski remained on the board.

In February 2024, ContextLogic sold the Wish platform to the Singapore-based e-commerce company Qoo10 for approximately $173 million.
