= FSO Ogar =

Polish concept sports car

FSO Ogar LS
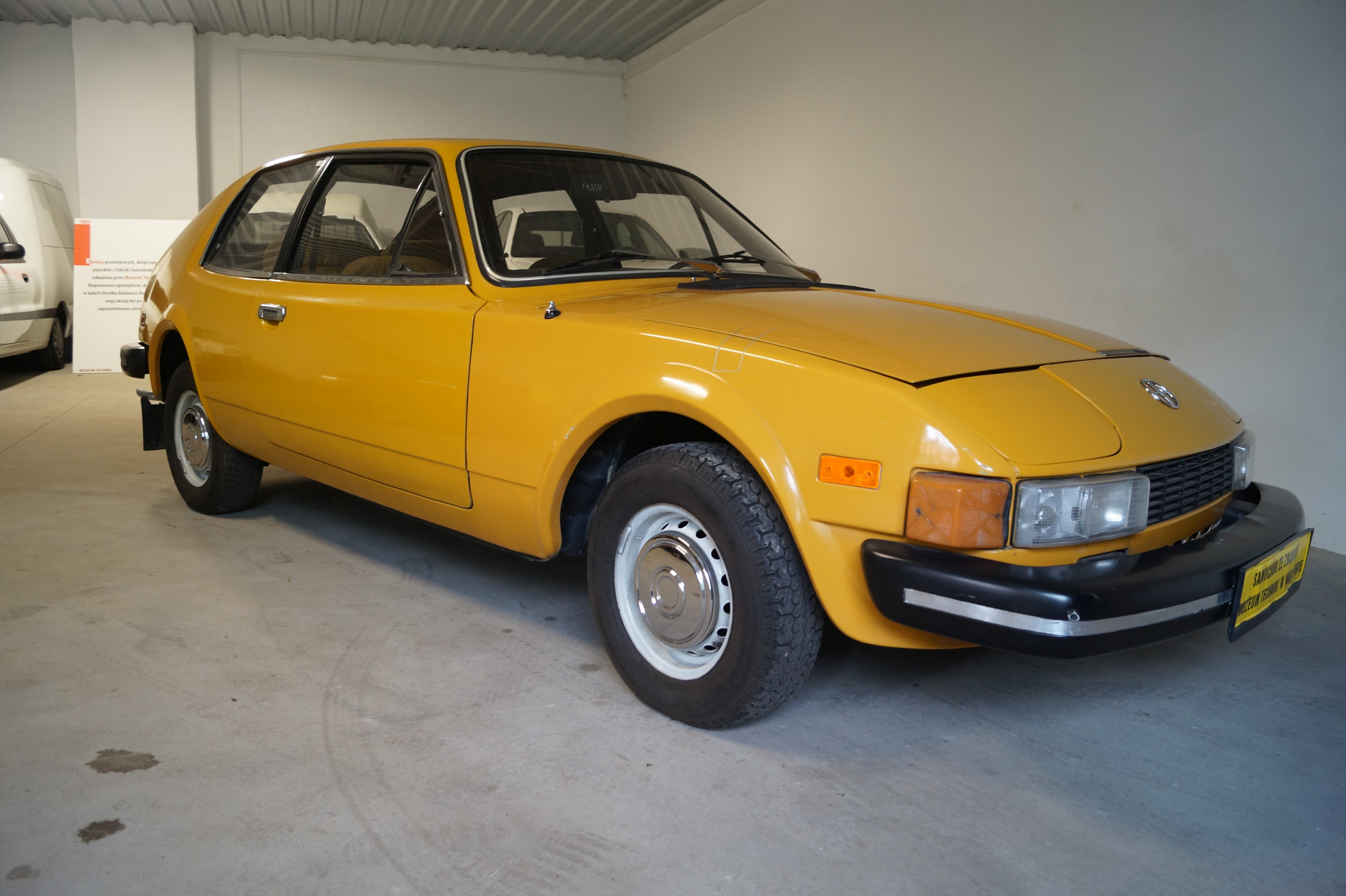
- The FSO Ogar after restoration.

Overview
- Manufacturer: FSO
- Production: 1977
- Assembly: Warsaw
- Designer: Cezary Nawrot

Body and chassis
- Class: Sports car (S)
- Body style: 3-door coupé
- Layout: Rear wheel drive

Powertrain
- Engine: R4 1.5 litre OHV; 82 HP (60 kW)
- Transmission: 4-speed manual

Dimensions
- Length: 4455 mm
- Width: 1630 mm
- Height: 1320 mm
- Curb weight: 900 kg

The FSO Ogar is a Polish concept sports car developed in 1977 by Fabryka Samochodów Osobowych (FSO) in Warsaw, using components from the Polski Fiat 125p.

== Description ==
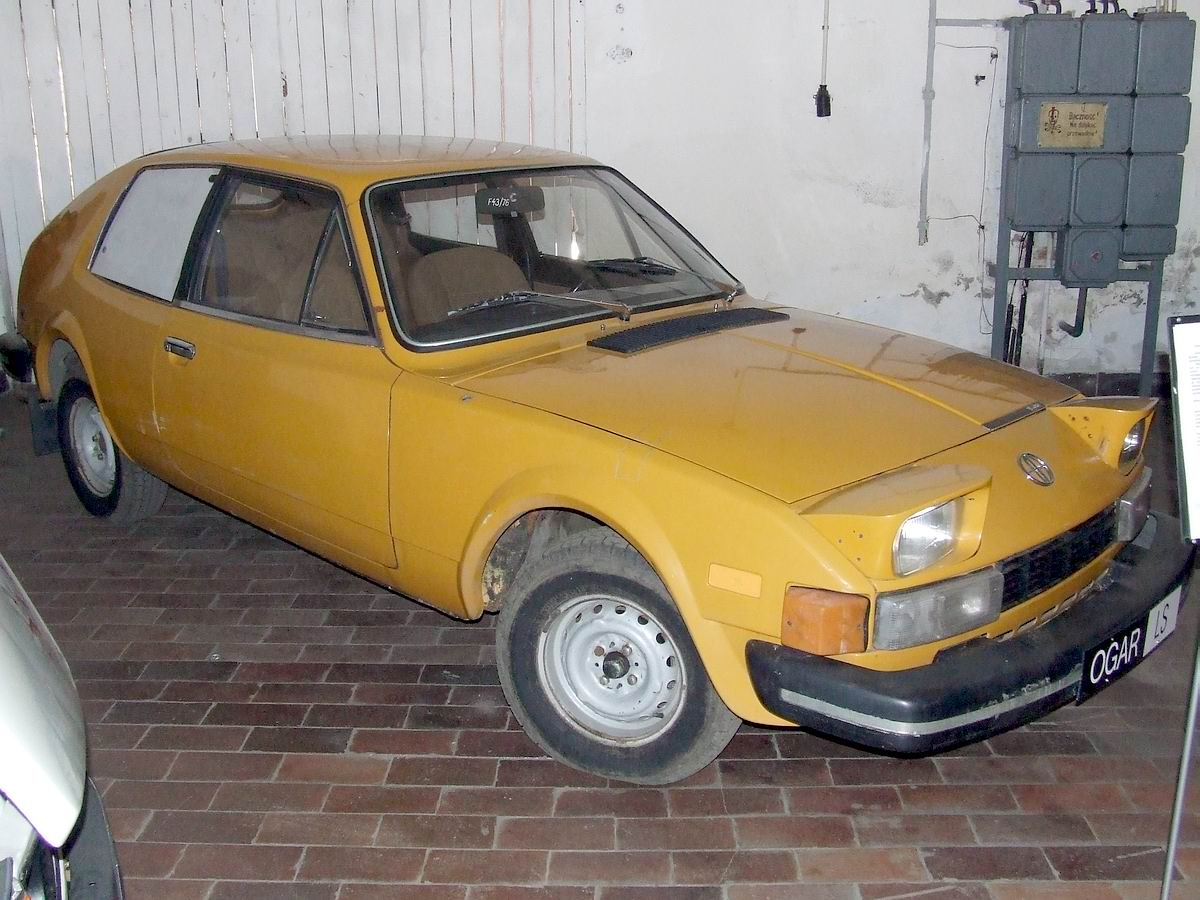
The FSO Ogar before restoration.

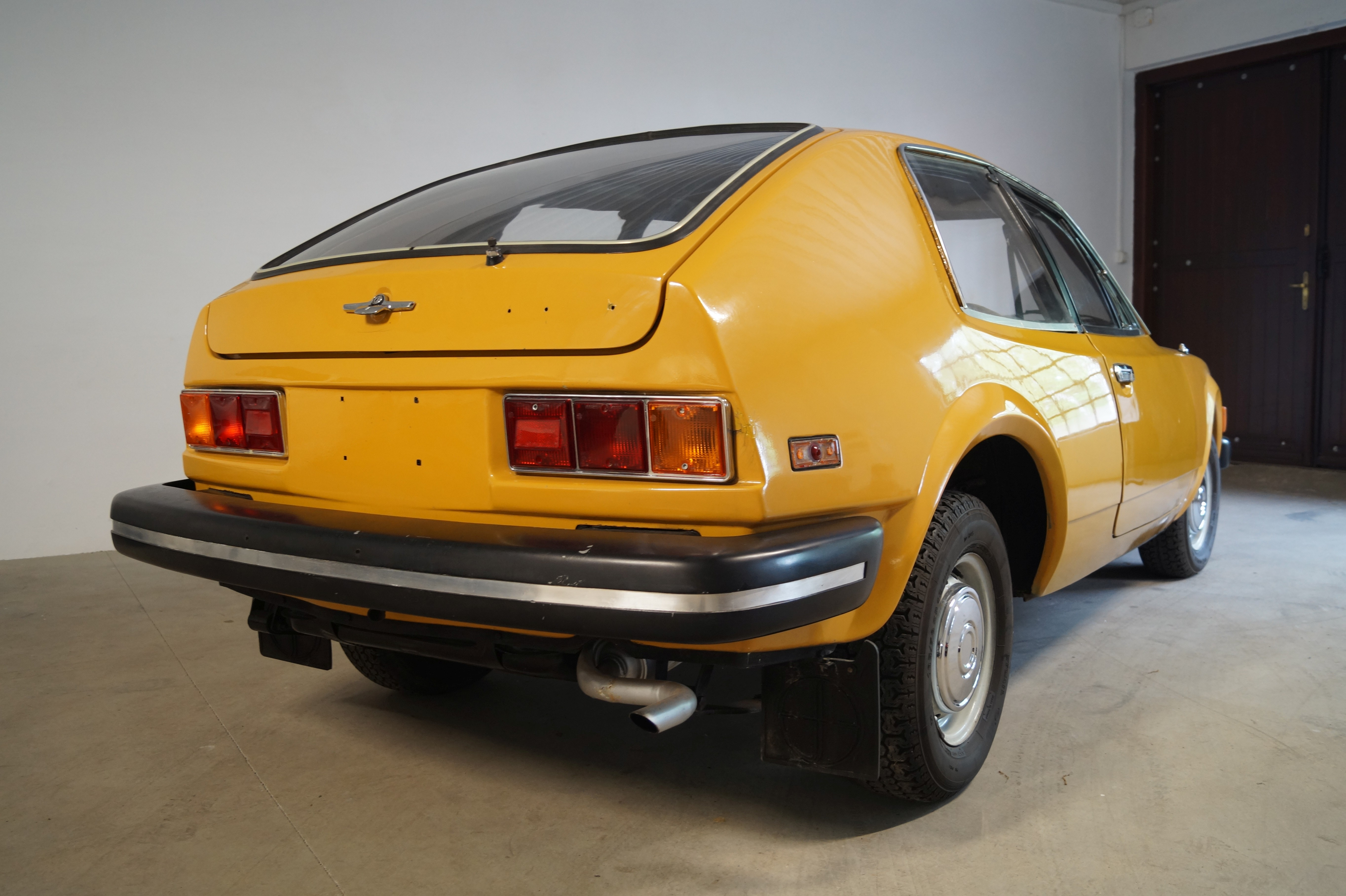
Rear view

Built in 1977, the Ogar was based on the chassis of the Polski Fiat 125p, also using elements of its drivetrain, suspension and braking system. A distinguishing feature of the Ogar was the modern and streamlined body, designed by Cezary Nawrot, and the electrically retractable headlights, modelled after sports cars of the period. Wheel rims made of light metal alloys were an additional sporty feature. The body was made of a laminate combination of epoxy resin and fiberglass and was designed in compliance with regulations set by the United States Department of Transportation, meaning it was equipped with large, protruding bumpers and marker lamps on the front and rear fenders. The interior of the car could be accessed through the three doors and featured 4 soft and comfortable, but not very sporty seats. The prototype travelled over 70,000 miles, and despite positive public opinion, was not put into production. The reason for this was the more advanced development of the more functional FSO Polonez, and the lack of a justification for producing a sports car in Poland.

The only copy of the Ogar is in the Automotive Museum in Warsaw, and the body cast can be seen at the Faculty of Mechanical Engineering at the Military University of Technology.

== Technical data ==
=== Body ===
- Number of doors: 3, suspended on the front pillars and the rear edge of the roof
- Front wheel track: 1298 mm
- Rear wheel track: 1275 mm

=== Engine ===
- Type: 115C.076/56
- Four-stroke, carburetor
- Number and arrangement of cylinders: 4, in-line arrangement
- Displacement: 1481 ^{cm3}
- Maximum power: 82 HP (60 kW ) at 5,400 rpm

=== Drive transfer ===
- Driven axle: rear
- Clutch: dry, single-disc
- Gearbox: manual, four-speed plus reverse gear
- Gear change: lever on the floor between the seats

=== Suspension ===
- Front axle: independent, upper and lower triangular wishbones, coil springs, telescopic shock absorbers, anti-roll bar, reaction bars
- Rear suspension: rigid axle, two longitudinal double-leaf springs, telescopic shock absorbers, reaction bars

=== Electrical installation ===
- Battery: 12V, 48Ah

=== Wheels and tires ===
- Wheels: 41/2Jx13"
- Tires: 5.60 SR-13"

=== Operational data ===
- Maximum speed: approx. 155 km/h
- Fuel consumption: approx. 7-10 l/100 km
