= ShopClues =

Indian online marketplace

Shopclues.com

- Screenshot
- Website type: E-commerce
- Available in: English
- Founded: July 2011; 15 years ago
- Headquarters: Gurgaon, Haryana, India
- Area served: India
- Owner: Clues Network Pvt. Ltd.
- Founder: Sanjay Sethi
- Industry: Internet
- Services: Online shopping
- Revenue: ▼₹209.46 crore (US$22 million) (2019)
- Employees: 700 (2017)
- Parent: Qoo10
- Website: www.shopclues.com
- Current status: Active

ShopClues is an Indian online marketplace, owned by Clues Network Pvt. Ltd. The company was established in July 2011 by Sanjay Sethi, Sandeep Aggarwal and Radhika Aggarwal. In 2015, ShopClues was valued at US$1.1 billion, with Tiger Global, Helion Ventures, and Nexus Venture Partners as major investors. In 2019, the company was acquired by Singapore-based Qoo10 in an all-stock deal valued at approximately US$70 million, representing one of the largest valuation meltdowns for an Indian-based startup.

== History ==
ShopClues provides unstructured categories of home and kitchen, fashion, electronics and daily utility items.

In June 2015, ShopClues launched a financing platform Capital Wings to fund its merchants' businesses. In December 2015, the company invested towards seed funding in HeyBiz, which is a real-time shopping assistant app.

In January 2016, ShopClues raised US$100 million from Tiger Global Management and joined the Unicorn Club. In 2016, ShopClues launched its Android app for sellers, and later added iOS apps.

In May 2016, it partnered with GoDaddy to assist its small and medium entrepreneurs in starting their own e-commerce websites. In July 2016, launched an ad platform, AdZone wherein sellers may market their products with the help of native and custom advertising.

In June 2016, the online marketplace claimed to have half a million sellers on its platform. In July 2016, ShopClues acquired Momoe, a Bangalore-based mobile payments company.

In 2019, ShopClues was acquired by Singapore-based Qoo10 for US$70 million.

== Key people ==
- Sanjay Sethi - Co-Founder and Chief Executive Officer (CEO)
- Sandeep Agarwal - Co-Founder and Chief Operations Officer (COO)
- Radhika Aggarwal - Co-Founder and Chief Business Officer (CBO)

== Controversy ==
- In August 2015, the owner of the brand Ray-Ban, Luxottica Group accused ShopClues of allegedly selling fake products and took up the issue in court. The Delhi High Court pulled up ShopClues for breaching its earlier order and continuing the sale of Ray-Ban products.
- The site has had a number of complaints both from customers and from other businesses claiming that the site is selling fake products.
- In 2013, founder and CEO Sandeep Agarwal was charged with insider trading and arrested in the US. Agarwal subsequently pleaded guilty and entered a plea bargain on the charges. Agarwal resigned from ShopClues in 2013.

== See also ==
- E-commerce in India
- Online shopping
