= Żerań Power Station =

Coal-fired power station in Poland

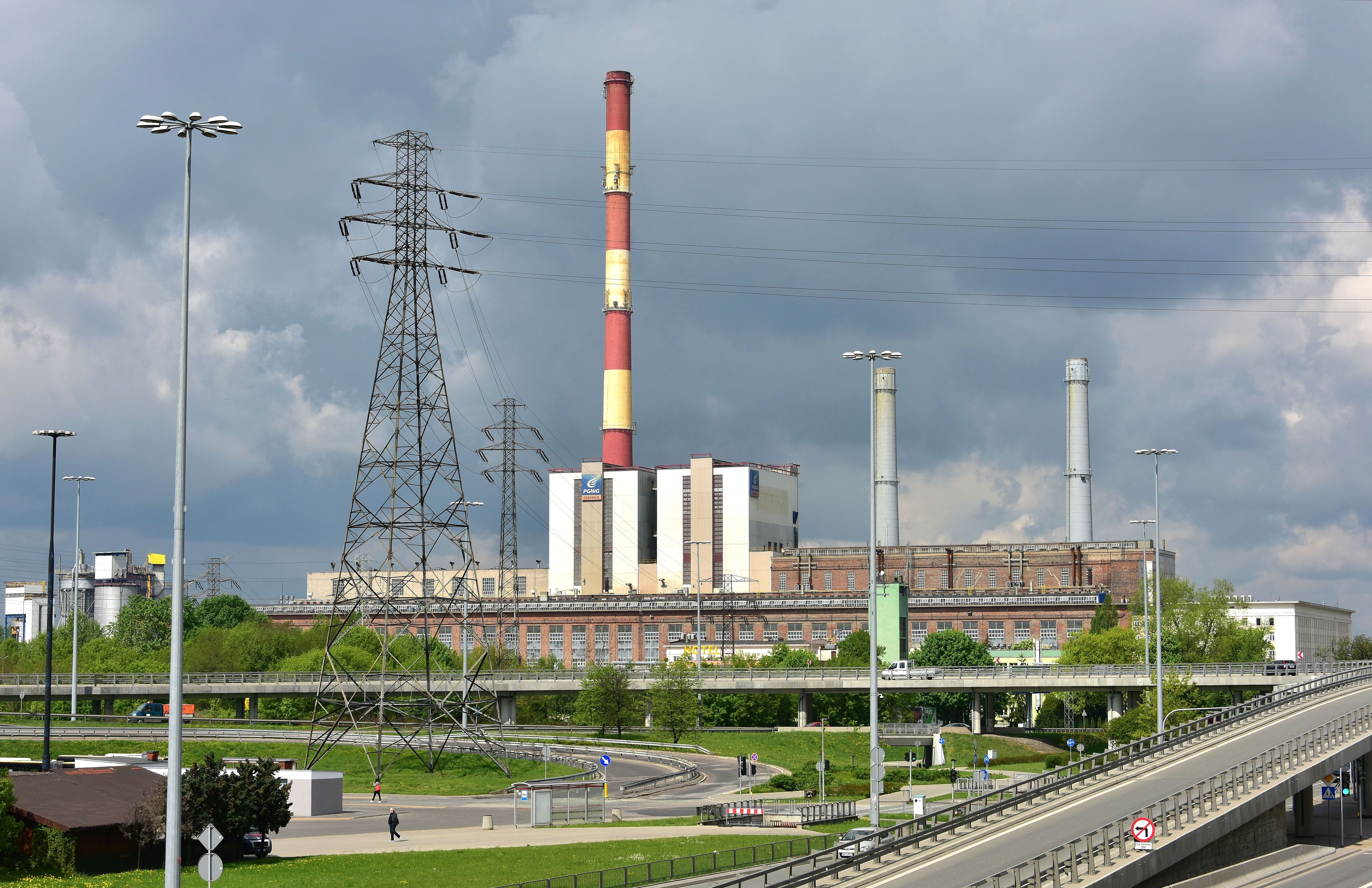
- Official name: Elektrociepłownia Żerań
- Country: Poland
- Location: Żerań, Białołęka, Warsaw
- Coordinates: 52°17′40″N 20°59′37″E
- Status: Operational
- Commission date: 1954
- Owner: Vattenfall
- Operator: PGNiG

Thermal power station
- Primary fuel: Hard coal
- Secondary fuel: Biomass
- Cogeneration?: Yes
- Thermal capacity: 1,561 MWt

Power generation
- Nameplate capacity: 350 MW

External links
- Website: termika.pgnig.pl
- Commons: Related media on Commons

Żerań Heat Power Station (Polish: Elektrociepłownia Żerań) is a coal-fired heat power station in the northeastern Warsaw suburb of Żerań, Poland. Built between 1952 and 1956 to Soviet design specifications – with the first turbine becoming operational on 21 July 1954 – it underwent modernisation in the years 1997-2001 when it was taken over by Vattenfall. It is now owned by PGNiG. The station has a heat generation capacity of 1,561 MW and an electric generation capacity of 350 MW.

Żerań Heat Power Station has three flue gas stacks: the tallest of which stands at 200 metres (660 ft) whilst the other two both reach a height of 110 metres (360 ft).
