= Radhika Aggarwal =

Indian businesswoman

Radhika Ghai Aggarwal is an Indian Internet entrepreneur and India's first woman to enter the Unicorn Club. She is the co-founder of online marketplace ShopClues established in 2011 in silicon valley, and the chief business officer of the company.

== Early life ==
Aggarwal was born to an Army family. Her father was in the Indian Army while her mother was a dietician. Her entrepreneurial venture started when her father decided to start his own health club in 1992, followed by the establishment of her own advertising agency in Chandigarh in 1997.

== Education ==
Aggarwal has an MBA from Washington University in St. Louis and holds a post-graduation degree in advertising and public relations. She was also part of an executive program at Stanford University.

== Career ==
Aggarwal worked in marketing for companies like Nordstrom in Seattle and strategic planning at Goldman Sachs. She holds about 14 years of experience in the US in diverse sectors such as e-commerce, lifestyle, fashion, and retail.

== Awards and recognition ==
- Outlook Business Woman of Worth at Outlook Business Awards – 2016
- Woman Entrepreneur of the Year at Entrepreneur India Awards – 2016
- Exemplary Woman Entrepreneur of the Year at CMO Asia Awards – 2016
- CEO of the Year Award at CEO India Awards – 2016
- ASSOCHAM's Entrepreneur of the Year award - 2017
