= Sanjay Sethi =

Sanjay Sethi (born 27 June 1972) is a mechanical engineer and Internet entrepreneur. In 2011, he co-founded ShopClues, a Gurgaon-based online marketplace for unbranded goods. He is currently the chief executive officer of the company.

== Education ==
Sethi completed his B.Tech in mechanical engineering from Indian Institute of Technology (BHU) Varanasi in 1993. Passionate about Astrophysics, he declined an offer from the Inter-University Centre for Astronomy and Astrophysics to pursue a professional career. In 1996, Sethi pursued an advanced course in software technology from Indian Institute of Technology Delhi.

== Career ==
Sethi started his career at the Rourkela Steel Plant but his journey with internet and technology started when he enrolled at the Foundation for Innovation and Technology Transfer at the Indian Institute of Technology Delhi.

Prior to the launch of ShopClues, Sethi has worked with eBay, where he served as the Global Product Head for shipping, logistics, and billing and payments. Prior to eBay, Sanjay worked with SaaS platform Tradebeam.

== ShopClues ==
ShopClues, claimed to be one of the largest online marketplaces in India, was launched in 2011 by Sanjay Sethi, Sandeep Aggarwal, and Radhika Aggarwal. ShopClues entered the Unicorn Club in 2016, with its valuation at US$1.1 billion.

== Awards and recognition ==
- CEO of the Year at CMO Asia Awards – 2016
- Distinguished Alumni Award at IIT-BHU Alumni Awards – 2016
- CEO of the Year at CEO India Awards – 2016

== Usurping the e-commerce Controversy ==
An FIR of forgery to usurp Shopclues from Sandeep Aggarwal and the subsequent misappropriation of funds was filed against Sanjay Sethi. However, Delhi High Court soon passed an interim order forbidding any coercive action against Sanjay. Sanjay also faced a defamation suit from Sandeep Aggarwal in March 2017.
