= Henryków, Białołęka =

Neighbourhood in Warsaw, Poland

Henryków
- Neighbourhood
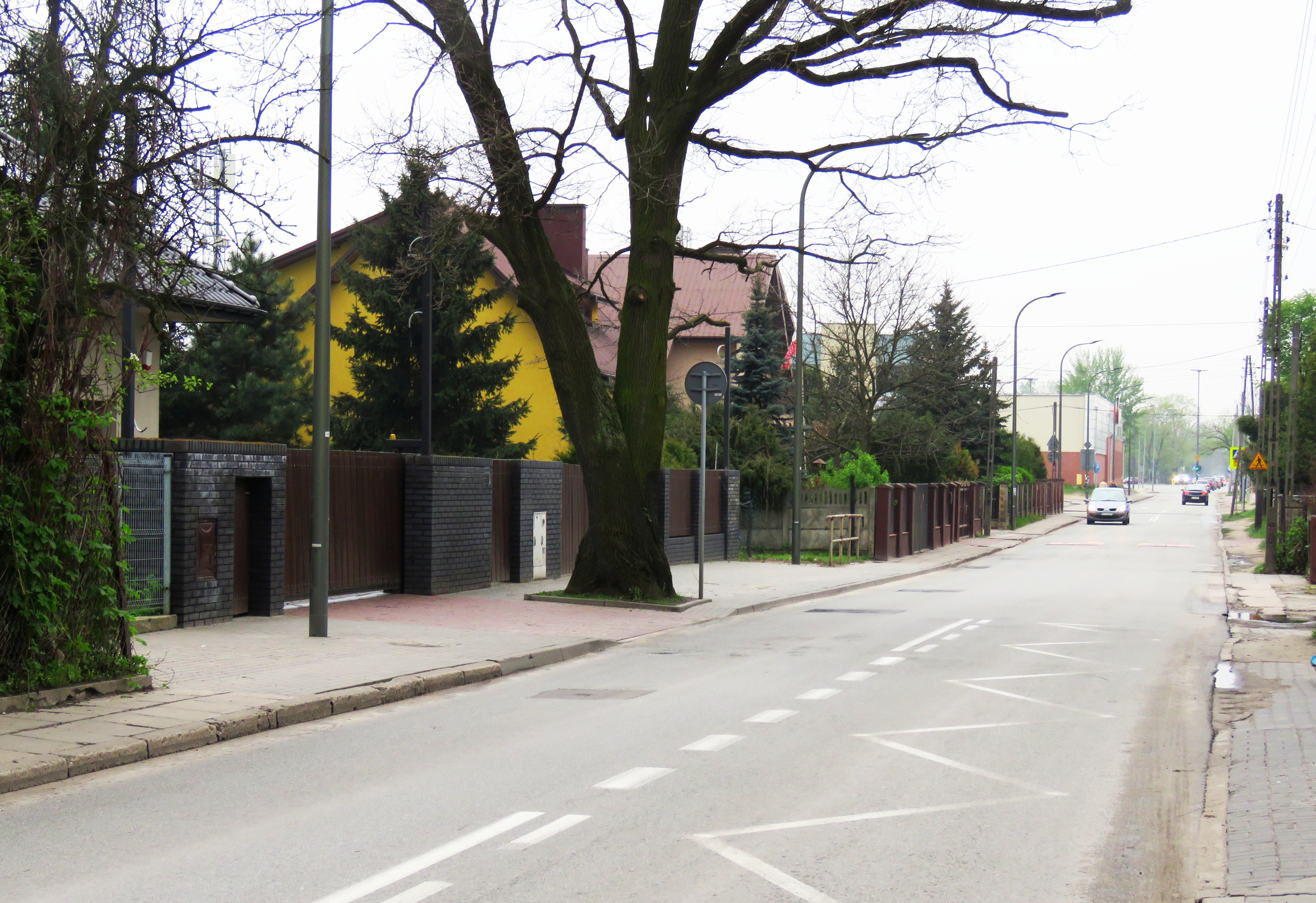
- Interactive map of Henryków
- Coordinates: 52°19′45″N 20°58′40″E
- Country: Poland
- Voivodeship: Masovian
- City county: Warsaw
- District: Białołęka
- Osiedle: Henryków
- Founded: 1904
- Incorporated: 1951
- Time zone: UTC+1 (CET)
  - Summer (DST): UTC+2 (CEST)
- Vehicle registration: WA
- SIMC: 0919453

Henryków (Polish pronunciation: [xɛnˈrɘ̟.kuf]) is a neighborhood of the Białołęka district of northern Warsaw, Poland. The estate is located east of Modlińska Street.

== History ==
In the interwar period, the then village of Henryków was part of the former Jabłonna commune. In 1951 it became part of Warsaw. The name Henrykowa derives from the name of the Jewish entrepreneur Henryk Bienental, who in 1904 launched a distillery on the site of the former buildings of the Dąbrówka farm. In the 1930s, the factory employed over 50 employees, the factory settlement had 139 inhabitants, and the village of Henryków located around it had about 650 inhabitants. Henryków was then the largest population centre in the area of today's Białołęka.

== Landmarks ==
The complex of the former yeast factory at Klasyków Street contributed to the development of this part of Białołęka and is one of the better preserved industrial plants from the turn of the 19th and 20th centuries in Warsaw. It has survived to modern times in a little changed form. The complex includes a residential house – a unique example of a factory villa – preserved in almost unchanged form. The former yeast plant complex is being renovated by the Finnish developer YIT and will become part of the Aroma Park housing project.
