= Tarchomin =

Coordinates: 52°19′05″N 20°57′43″E

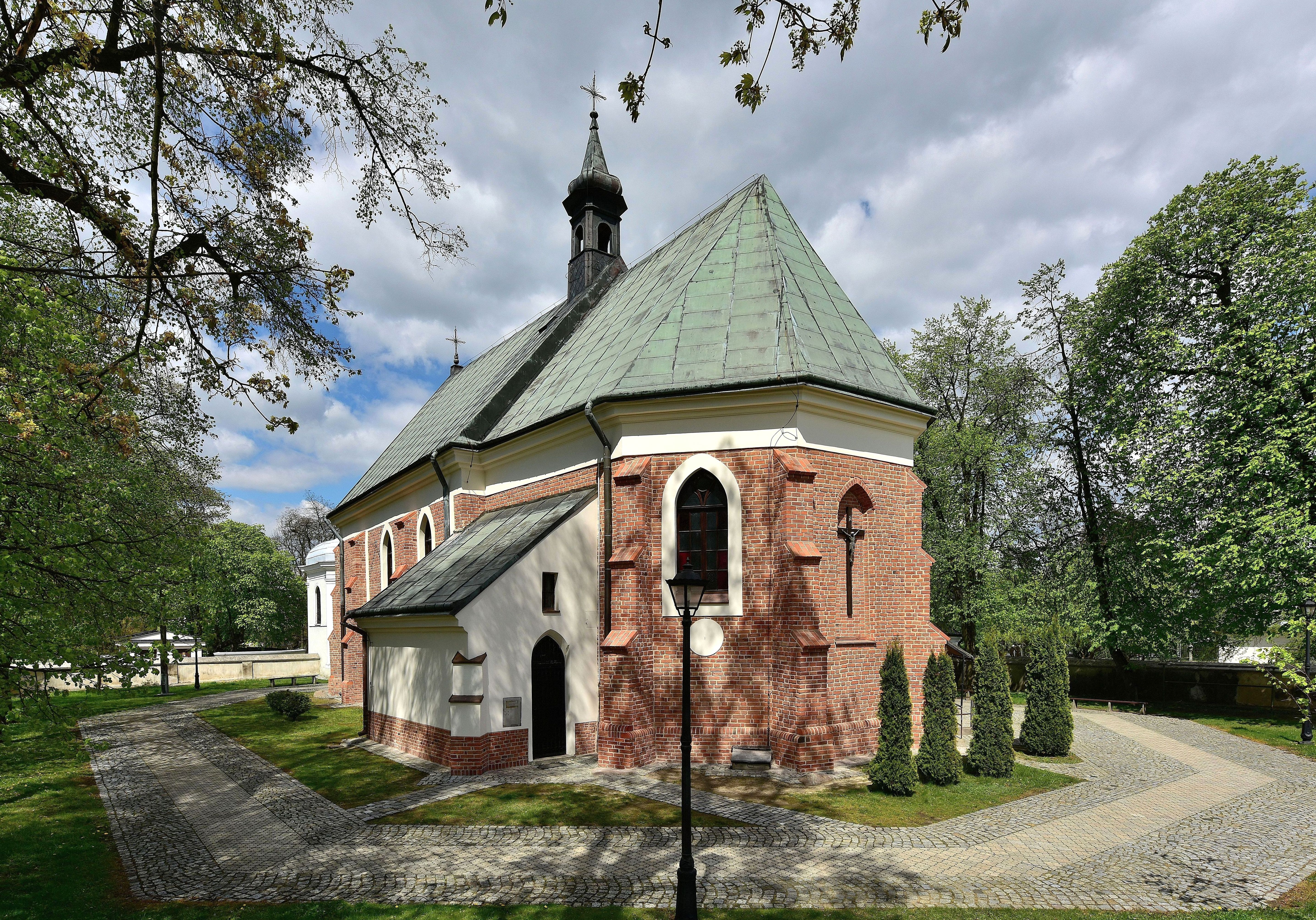
St James the Great (Jakuba) church

Tarchomin is a neighborhood of Białołęka district, in northern Warsaw, Poland.

== History ==
The village of Tarchomin has been known since the Middle Ages. Its name appears in documents as early as the 13th century. It was a noble village, inhabited by the Jastrzębiec family. In the 16th century it belonged to the Weslów, Zaliwski, and Ossoliński families who erected the Gothic church of St. James (Jakuba).

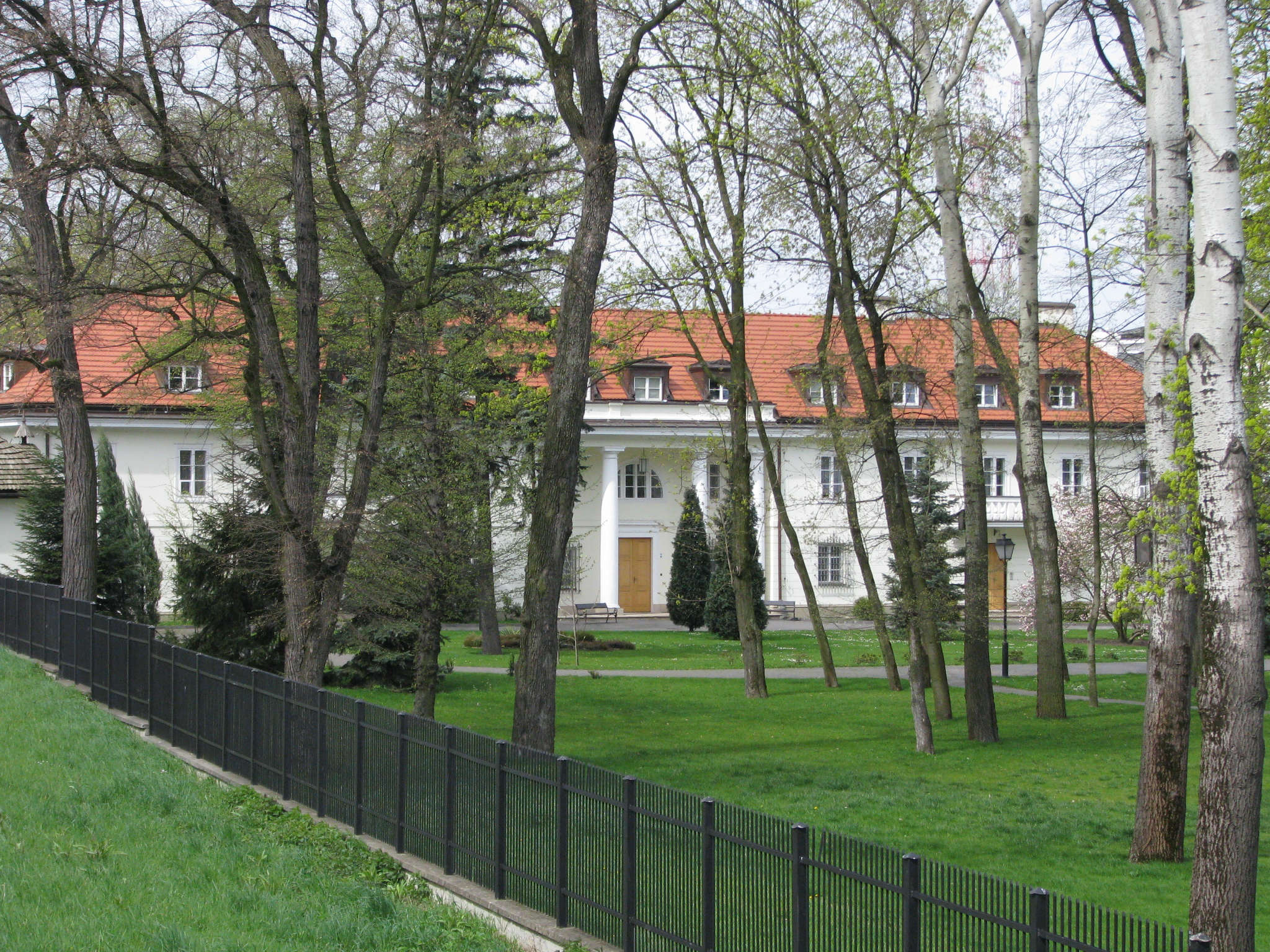
Mostowski Palace

The Tarchomin estate historically included the villages of Tarchomin, Dąbrówka Szlachecka, Dąbrówka Grzybowska, Kępa Tarchominska and Świdry. In the second half of the 19th century, there was a court residence and several farms in the Tarchomin area. In the 17th century, during the Ossoliński rule, the Mostowski palace and park complex was built near the church.

In the interwar period, the village of Tarchomin was part of the Jabłonna commune. These areas were annexed to Warsaw in 1951.

In September 2017, a large shopping center Galeria Północna was opened at the intersection of Światowida and Ulica Nadwiślańskiego.

== Notable people ==
- Piotr Szulczewski (born 1981), entrepreneur and founder and CEO of e-commerce site Wish.
