= Wish (company) =

American online e-commerce platform

Wish.com
- Logo of Wish.com since 2022
- Company type: E-commerce
- Website type: Public
- Available in: English and other languages
- Traded as: Nasdaq: LOGC
- Founded: July 4, 2010; 16 years ago
- Headquarters: Oakland, California, United States
- Area served: Worldwide
- Founders: Piotr Szulczewski; Sheng Zhang
- Chairperson: Tanzeen Syed
- Key people: Joe Yan (CEO); Ying Liu (CFO & COO)
- Industry: Online shopping
- Revenue: ▼US$571 million (2022)
- Operating income: ▼ −US$398 million (2022)
- Net income: ▼ −US$384 million (2022)
- Total assets: ▼US$799 million (2022)
- Total equity: ▼US$477 million (2022)
- Employees: 886 (2022)
- Subsidiaries: Wish Outlet; Wish Express; Wish Local for Partner Stores
- Website: www.wish.com plus.wish.com
- Advertising: Yes
- Commercial: Yes
- Registration: Required
- Launched: May 2011
- Current status: Active

Wish is an American online e-commerce platform. Wish was founded in 2010 by Piotr Szulczewski (former CEO) and Danny Zhang (former CTO).

Wish is currently operated by ContextLogic Inc. in San Francisco, United States, pending the completion of a sale to Qoo10 initiated in February 2024. The platform personalizes the shopping experience visually for each customer, rather than relying only on a search bar format. It allows sellers to list their products on Wish and sell directly to consumers. Wish works with payment service providers to handle payments and does not stock the products themselves or manage returns.

== History ==
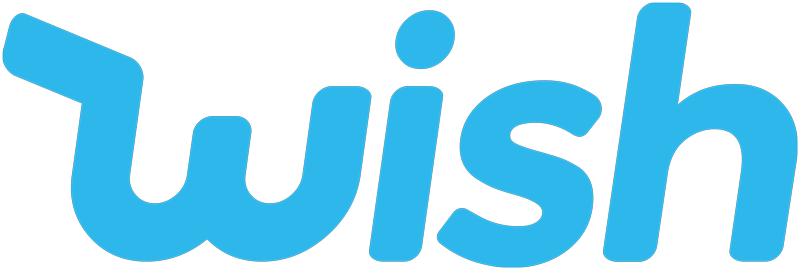
Logo until 2022

Wish was started by Peter Szulczewski, a former Google engineer, as a software company called ContextLogic. In September 2010, ContextLogic received $1.7 million in investments and involved Yelp CEO Jeremy Stoppelman.

In May 2011, Szulczewski invited college friend Danny Zhang to relaunch the company as Wish. It was created as an application that allowed shoppers to create wish lists of their favorite products before matching them with merchants. They also earned revenue with a Pay-per-click model by advertising on Facebook.

In 2013, Szulczewski met with Hans Tung, an investor with GGV Capital in Menlo Park, California, and noted that a large number of sales were coming from Florida, Texas and the Midwest rather than New York or California. Wish became an e-commerce site after asking merchants to host their products directly on the Wish application, with Wish taking a portion of each sale.

The Wish marketplace is accessed by the Wish.com website or by a mobile application that is available for iOS and Android.

In 2017, Wish was the most downloaded e-commerce application in the United States. It signed a multi-year partnership with the NBA's Los Angeles Lakers. Wish conducted a World Cup campaign in 2018, that featured Neymar, Paul Pogba, Tim Howard, Gareth Bale, Robin van Persie, Claudio Bravo and Gianluigi Buffon.

In 2018, Wish was the most-downloaded e-commerce application worldwide and the company doubled its revenue to $1.9 billion.

As of 2019, Wish was the third-biggest e-commerce marketplace in the United States by sales. In August 2019, ContextLogic received a Series H funding round, led by equity firm General Atlantic, taking the company's valuation to $11.2 billion. JD.com is an investor in Wish. ContextLogic went public via an IPO in 2020.

In January 2022, Wish appointed Vijay Talwar as the new CEO. As of September 8, 2022 Joe Yan has been appointed as the current Interim CEO of Wish. He previously worked at Stripe as a managing director and Country Head, Greater China. On February 23, 2023 the interim title was removed for Joe Yan and he was appointed as the permanent Chief Executive Officer. In France in March 2023, Wish was relisted, allowing the online marketplace to return to app stores and search engines in the country.

Wish was sold to Qoo10 in 2024 for $173 million, around 1% of its value at the time of its IPO just over three years earlier.

== Services ==
More than 1 million merchants list their products on Wish's platform to sell directly to consumers. The bulk of the merchandise available through the app in the United States comes from China and other non-U.S. distributors. The products are usually smaller items that are cheaper to ship, aided by an agreement between China Post and the USPS that lowers costs of shipping for goods weighing less than 2 kg (4.4 lb). Wish offers express shipping in 5 days, or 6–8 days in some cases, as well as standard shipping that takes 2–3 weeks.

Wish's "Wheel of Fortune"-style game, Blitz Buy, integrates a layer of gamification to offer consumers additional discounts on top-selling items.

== Criticism ==
Wish has been criticized for listing poor quality or counterfeit goods, a common concern among major e-commerce sites which feature independent sellers. Customers have complained about lack of communication from sellers and quality. In response to the criticism, Szulczewski hired an executive from Facebook to organize a community of about 10,000 Wish users to expose unsatisfactory dealers in exchange for free goods and discounts. In France in November 2021, the Wish e-commerce system, including the website and smartphone applications, were delisted from Google's search results and from Google's French app store, after French authorities claimed that many items sold on the platform do not comply with European regulations. The same authorities also accused the platform of selling counterfeit items.

On August 27, 2020, Which? bought six popular products from Wish. One of the items was a child's car seat, which was found to resemble ones from eBay, Amazon Marketplace, and AliExpress. The car seats from said retailers are dubbed "killer car seats". This kind of car seat is unsafe, and can send a 3-year-old flying through a windscreen.

It is often possible to purchase items from Wish that are not legal in the purchaser's country. In January 2020, a man from Nelson, Lancashire, United Kingdom, was sentenced to 11 months in prison for purchasing a stun gun using Wish.
