= FSC Lublin Automotive Factory =

Automotive factory in Poland established in 1950

Fabryka Samochodów Ciężarowych Fabryka Samochodów Honker
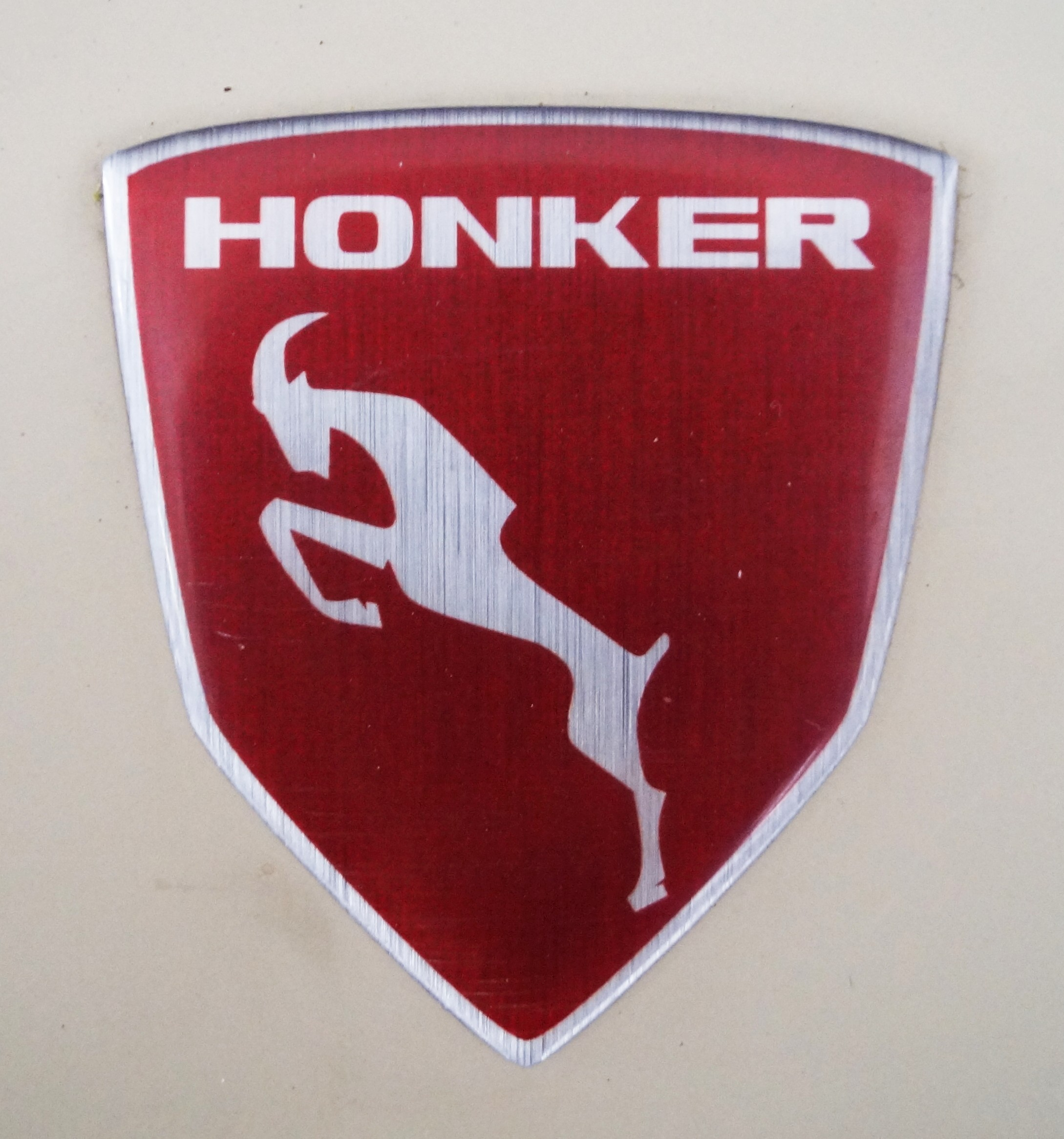
- Industry: Automotive
- Founded: 1948
- Headquarters: Lublin, Poland
- Key people: Zbigniew Tymiński
- Products: Automobiles
- Number of employees: 170 (2013)
- Parent: Intrall
- Website: FS Honker

The FSC Lublin Automotive Factory (Polish: Fabryka Samochodów Ciężarowych) commonly known as FSC, is a large motor vehicle factory in Poland established while the country was part of the Soviet Bloc. It was founded in 1950. The first vehicle left its assembly line on November 7, 1951. The factory was built on an open field in Lublin from the grounds up, to first produce light trucks and later vans, as well as vehicles for the military.

== PRL Period ==
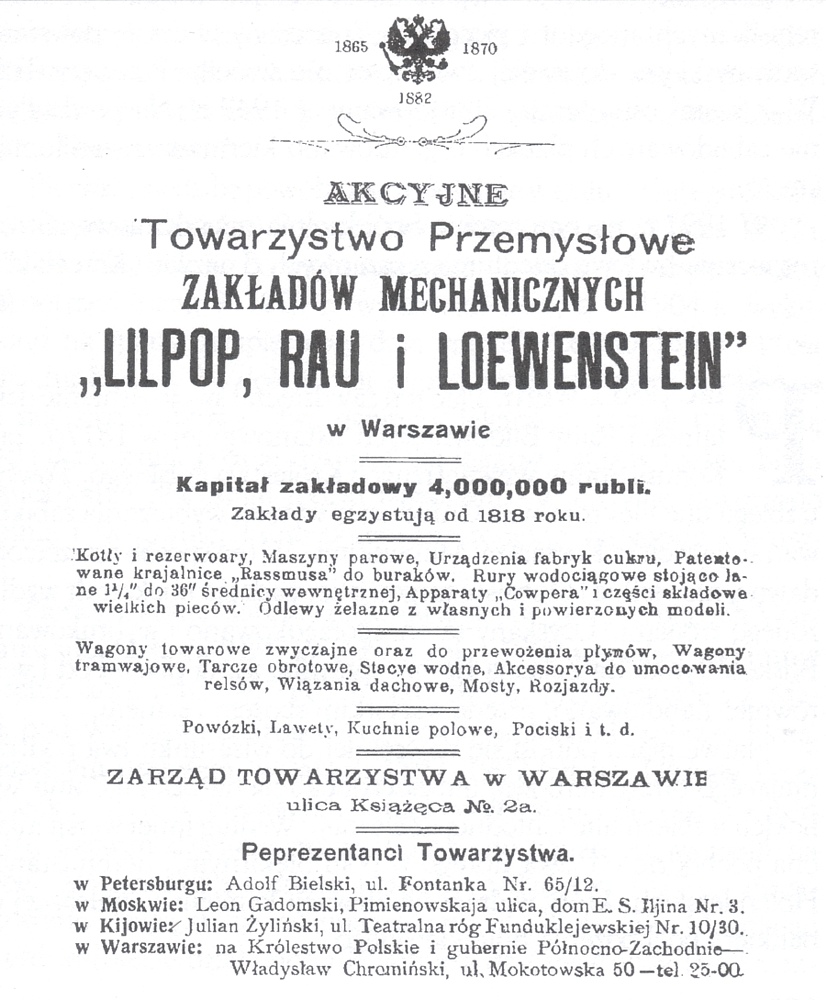
Advertisement for the Lilpop, Rau and Loewenstein Industrial Society

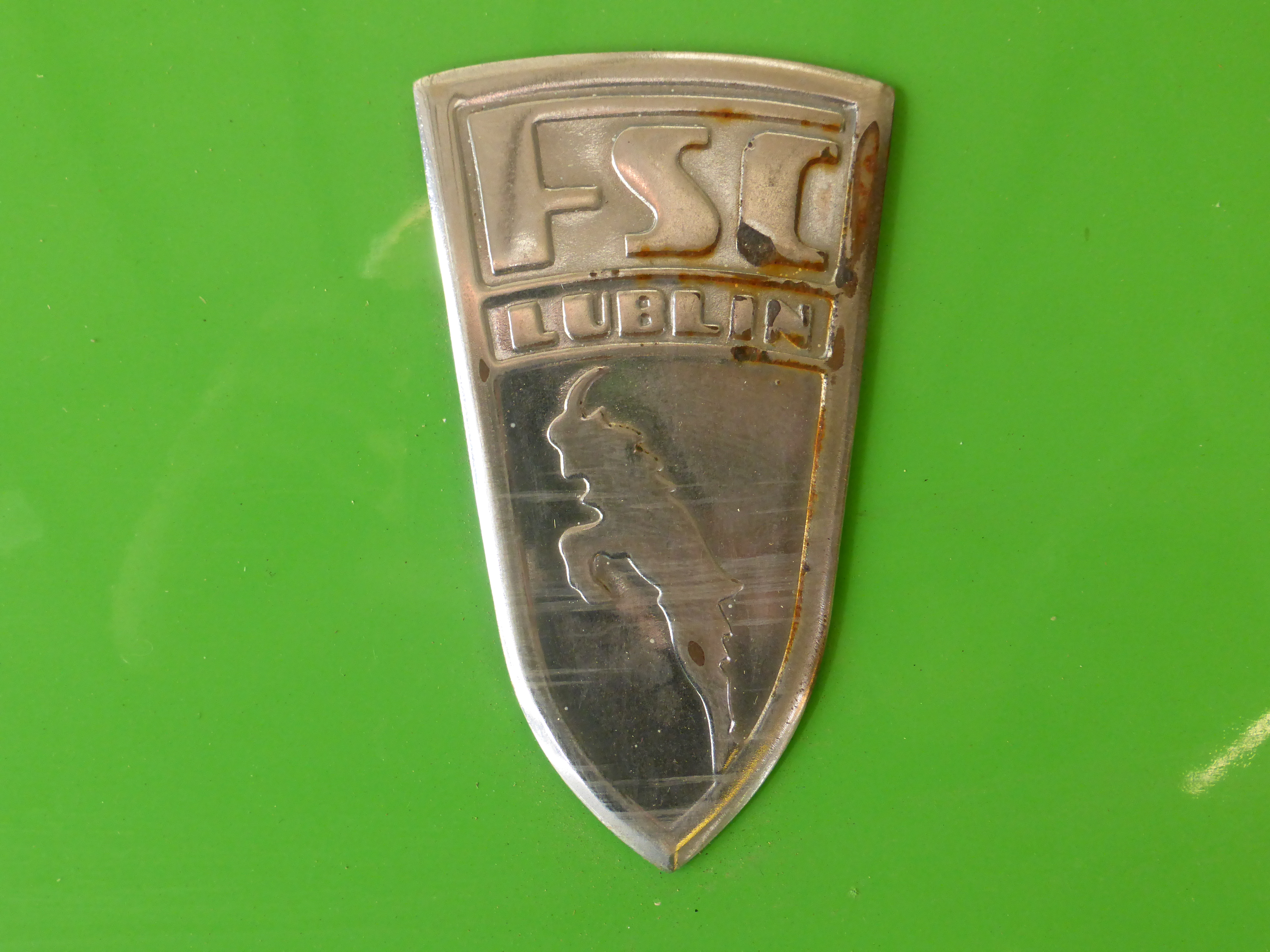
FSC logo on the Żuk van

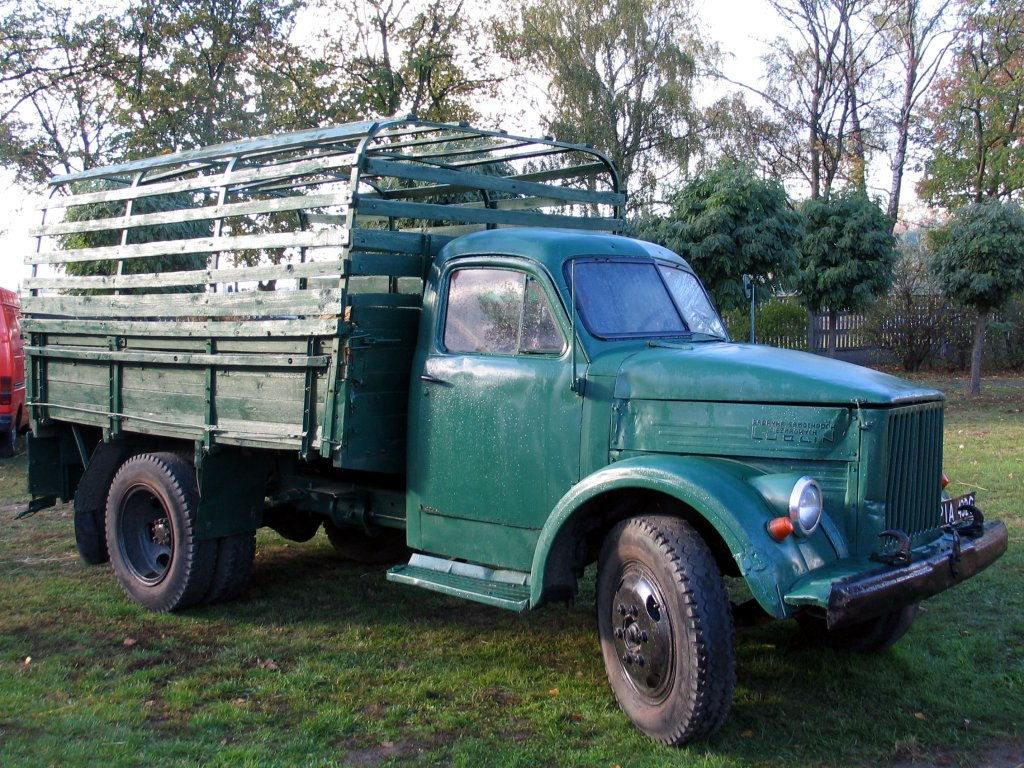
FSC Lublin-51

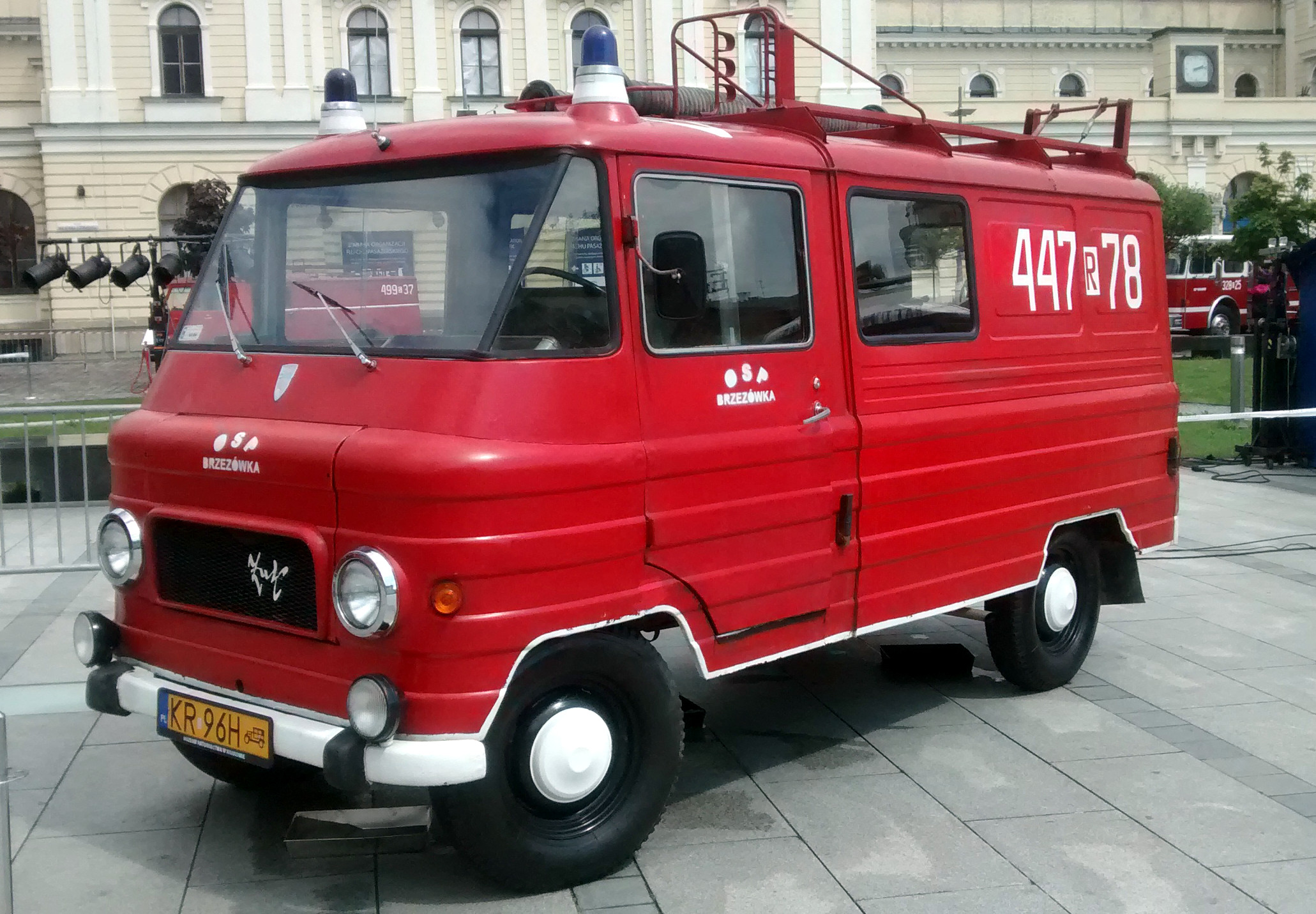
FSC Żuk A-15 fire engine

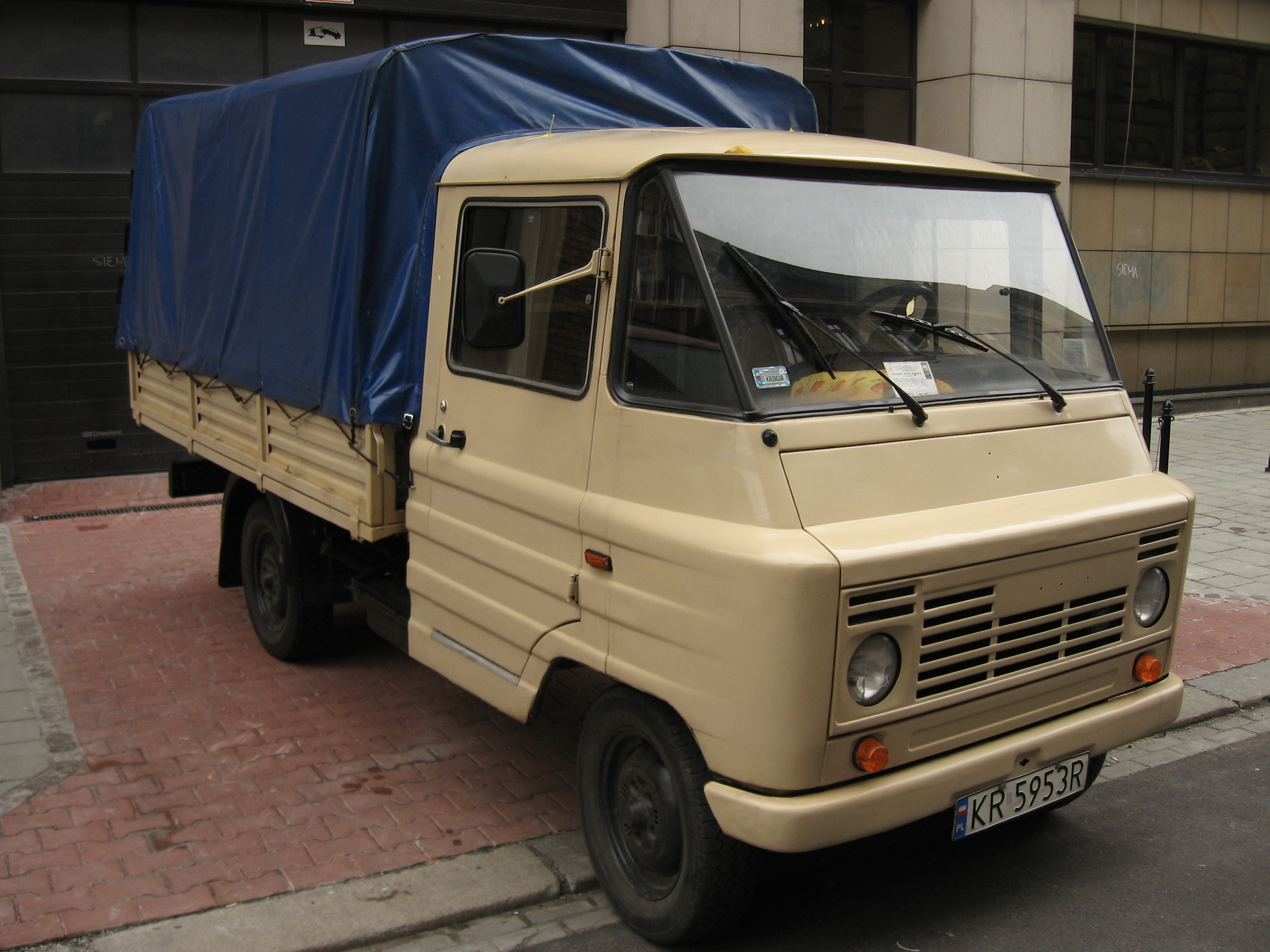
FSC Żuk A-11B

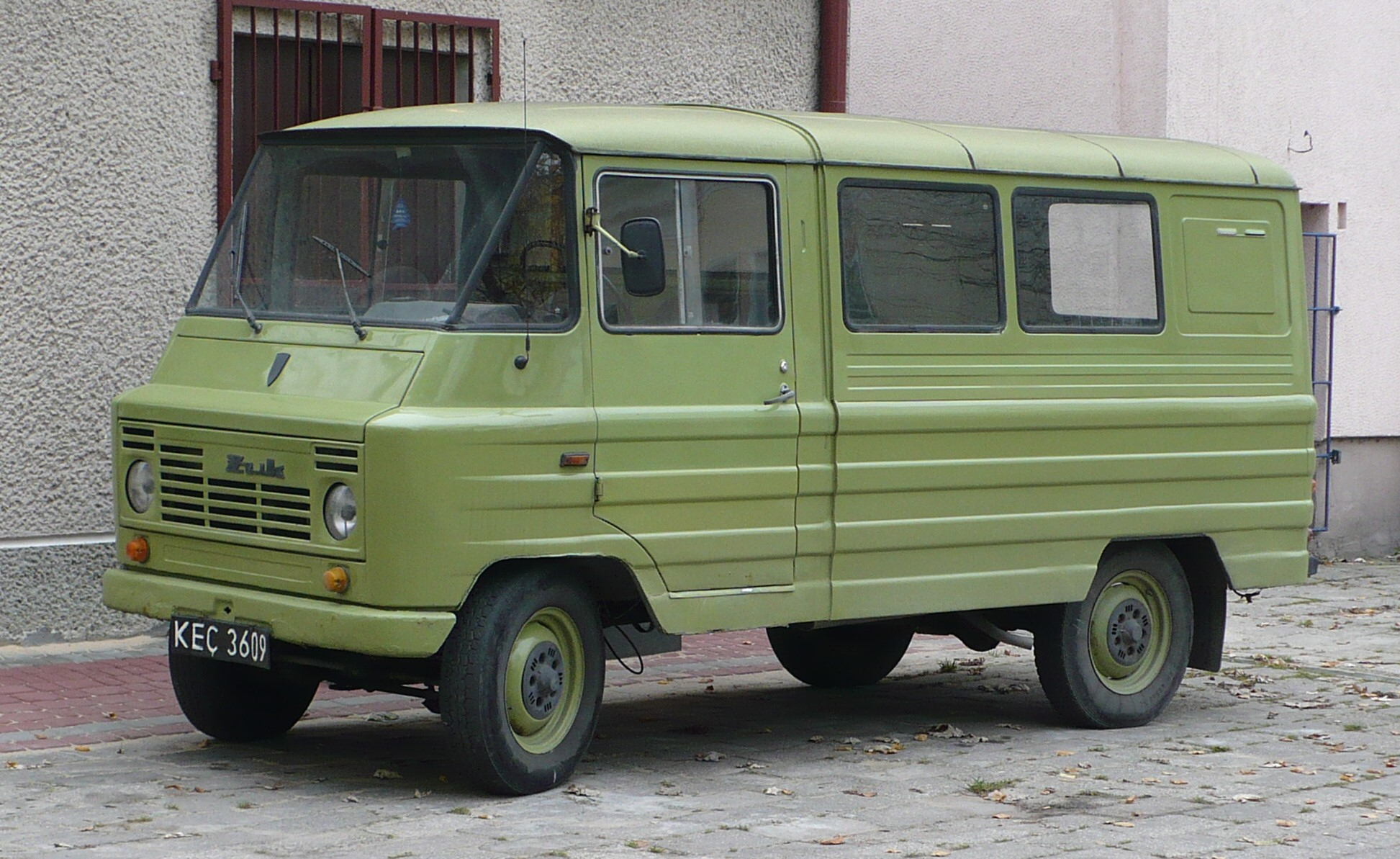
FSC Żuk A-07

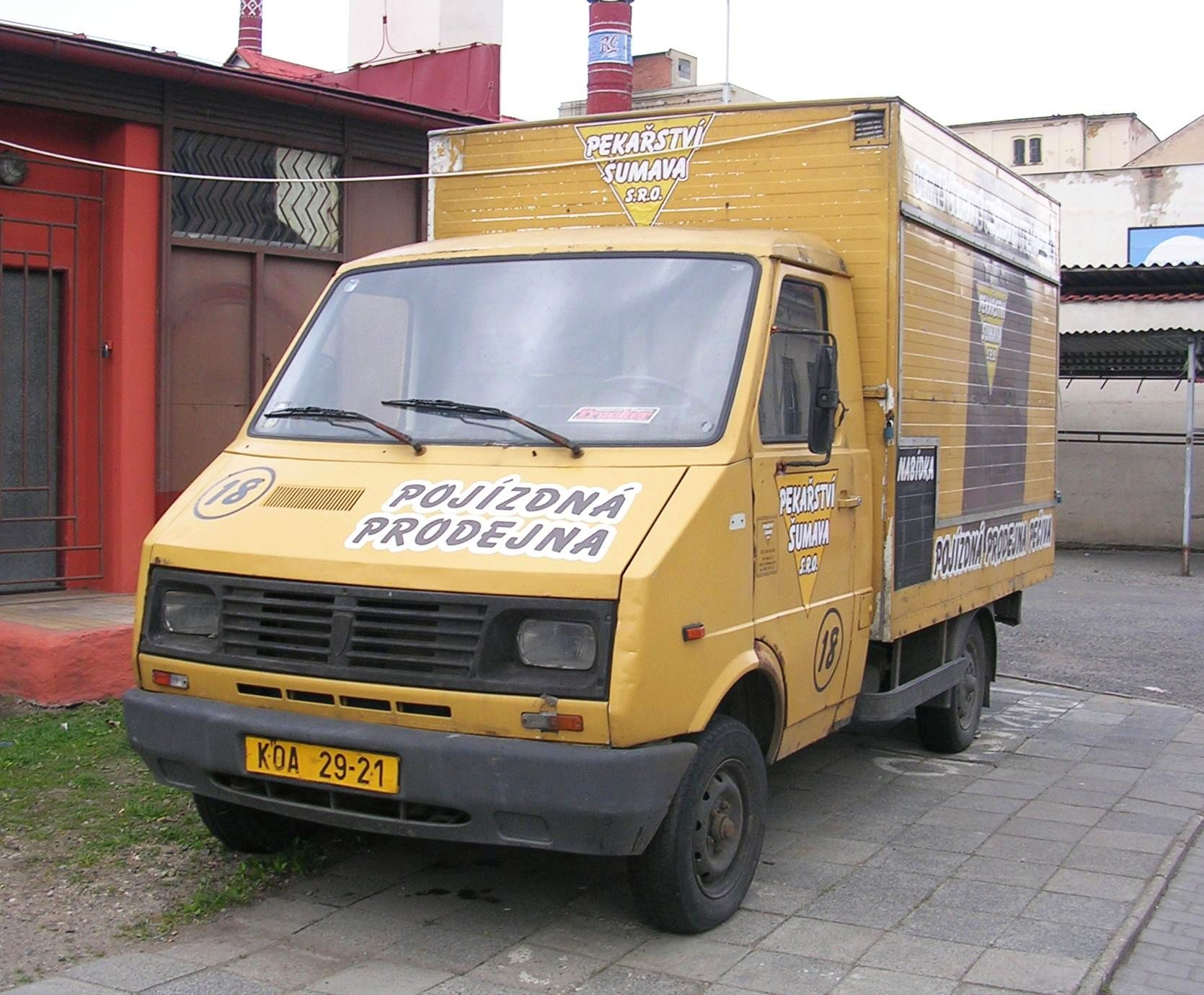
FS Lublin 33 in the Czech Republic

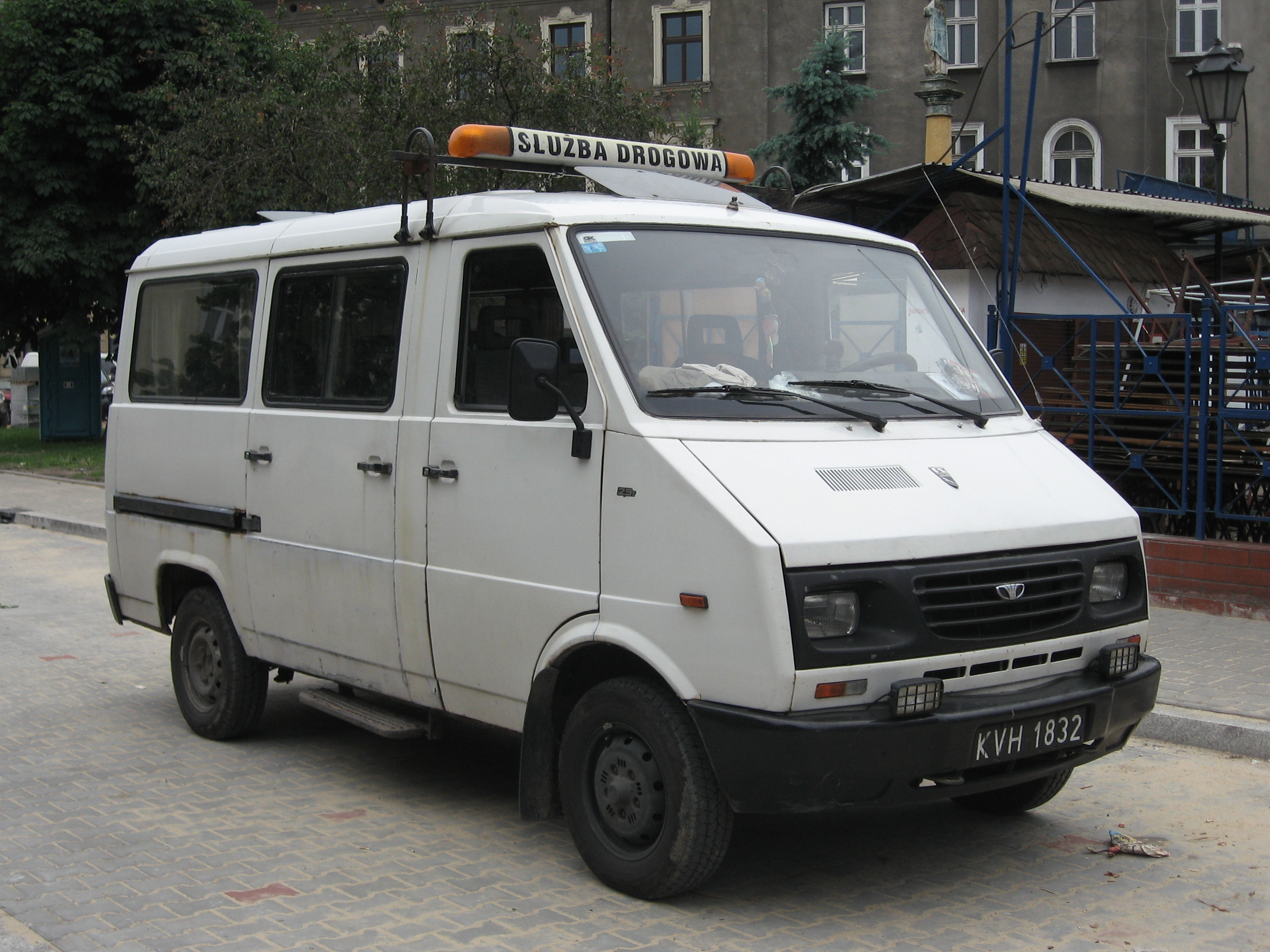
Daewoo Lublin II

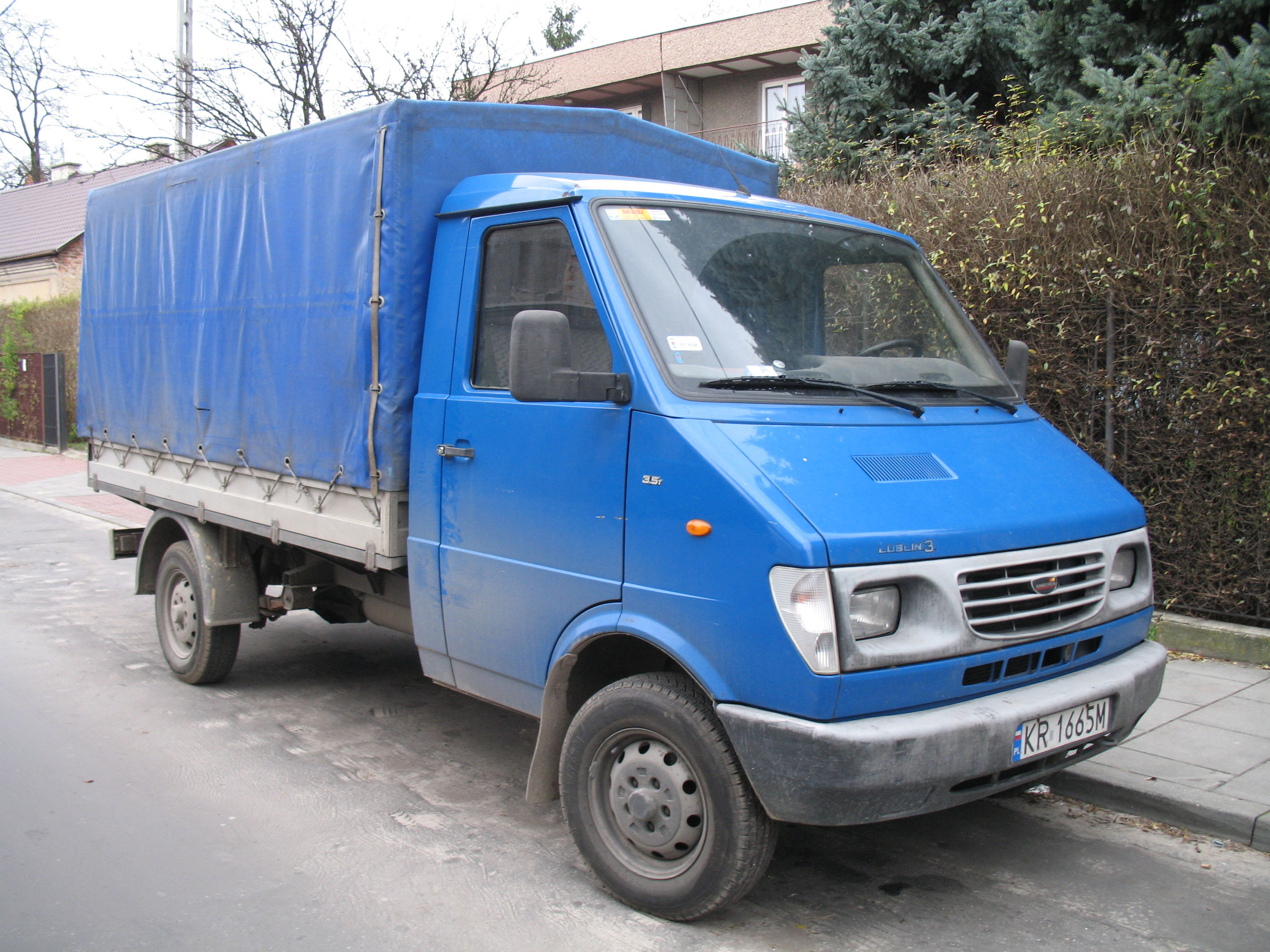
Andoria Lublin 3

=== Beginnings ===
The idea of establishing a car factory in north-eastern Lublin existed before World War II. In September 1938, the construction of a factory for the Warsaw company Lilpop, Rau i Loewenstein began in the Tatary district. The company intended to produce components for passenger cars and trucks under license from the American Chevrolet. It was planned to start the production of engines, front and rear drive axles, steering systems, as well as clutches and gear boxes. The engines were to be produced in numbers of up to 10,000 pieces per year, with production intended for domestic needs. Due to the outbreak of World War II, the investment was interrupted.

The idea was resumed after 1945, when the surviving part of the plant in Lublin became the basis for the "Truck Factory". The decision to establish the factory was made at the Unification Congress of the PPS and PPR in 1948. The establishment of the Lublin factory significantly influenced the formation of the new city emerging after the war for many years. FSC had a direct impact on the development of the surrounding residential districts - Tatar and Bronowice. New communication routes were designed with the production plant in mind.

The first work on FSC began in December 1950. Engineers from the USSR supervised all construction and assembly works, and the first employees of the FSC Lublin Factory received training at the Soviet GAZ plants. Technical documents and equipment also began to arrive from the USSR. One of the first facilities put into use was the main assembly department along with the welding and painting shop.

In accordance with the policy at the time, the plant began production on November 7, 1951 (the 34th anniversary of the October Revolution). The already obsolete GAZ 51s with the FSC badge and the name "FSC Lublin-51" came off the assembly lines. At the same time, production of the M-20 Pobeda began in Warsaw. The trucks from Lublin had a load capacity of 2.5 tons, a gasoline engine and a wooden driver's cabin.

In 1951, 88 Lublin 51 cars were produced. The following year, production was increased to 2,200 units. The preliminary design envisaged an increase in production to 12,000 cars per year. A total of 17,500 Polish GAZ 51s rolled off the assembly line in Lublin. Licensed production ended in 1958. The management tried to introduce more domestically produced components. From July 22, 1952, all wooden elements (the cabin) came from the Lublin plant.

After the first difficult years, FSC began to develop. In April 1954, the standardization department was opened and production began. Two years later, in 1956, a forge was opened, and in 1959 production began in the wheel and spring department. As a result of the factory's continuous development, its fixed assets in 1973 were estimated at PLN 3 billion. Later, the production of rims for other plants became the factory's specialty.

After the unsuccessful introduction of Lublin-51 to the Polish market, production of the flagship model, the Żuk, began in 1959. The Żuk would remain FSC's flagship model for over 50 years. The Lublin Żuk was entirely a product of Polish technical thought. The main creators of the new FSC product were engineers Stanisław Tański and Roman Skwarek. Constructed by the company's design office and using an engine and drive units from Warszawa, it set off to conquer Polish roads. In 1959, 1,084 Żuks were produced, and in 1973, 16,000 pieces. Thus, the share of the Lublin FSC in the domestic market increased from 30.2% in 1965 to 44.5% in 1973.

Lublin Żuks were exported to many countries around the world, including Egypt, where they were assembled at the ELTRAMCO factory under the name ELTRAMCO Ramzes from the 1970 to the 1990s, with parts supplied from Poland.

=== 1960s-1980s ===
In the years 1963–1971, the factory assembled the licensed SKOT armored personnel carrier, which was produced for the needs of the Armed Forces of the Polish People's Republic and the Czechoslovak People's Army. A total of approximately 4,500 vehicles of various versions were assembled. Half of the vehicles made by the factory were received by the Polish People's Army.

In addition to cars, FSC produced many components for domestic manufacturers; wheels, springs, iron castings, forgings, screw products, drive axles, etc. The main recipients of produced supplies included factories in Warsaw, Starachowice, and Bielsko-Biała. FSC's employment peaked in the 1970s. A significant number of employees were educated at the factory's Vocational School Complex, which included a Mechanical Technical Secondary School, a Basic Vocational School and a Secondary Vocational School . The factory was constantly growing, which resulted in the 1973 absorption of Fabryka Samochodów Rolniczych (Farming Vehicles Works) from Poznań-Antoninka (Greater Poland Voivodeship) and the rights to produce the FSR Tarpan agricultural and off-road vehicle.

FSC Lublin was repeatedly awarded state distinctions and decorations. Five times, it was awarded the Banner of the Prime Minister, the Order of the Banner of Labor, 1st class on February 20, 1975 by the 1st Sec. Central Committee of the Polish United Workers' Party, Edward Gierek.

At the end of the 1980s, employment in the factory began to decline, due to, among others, with the political and economic changes in Poland and with the increasingly outdated design of Żuk. Work was also underway on the car's successor.

== Recent History ==
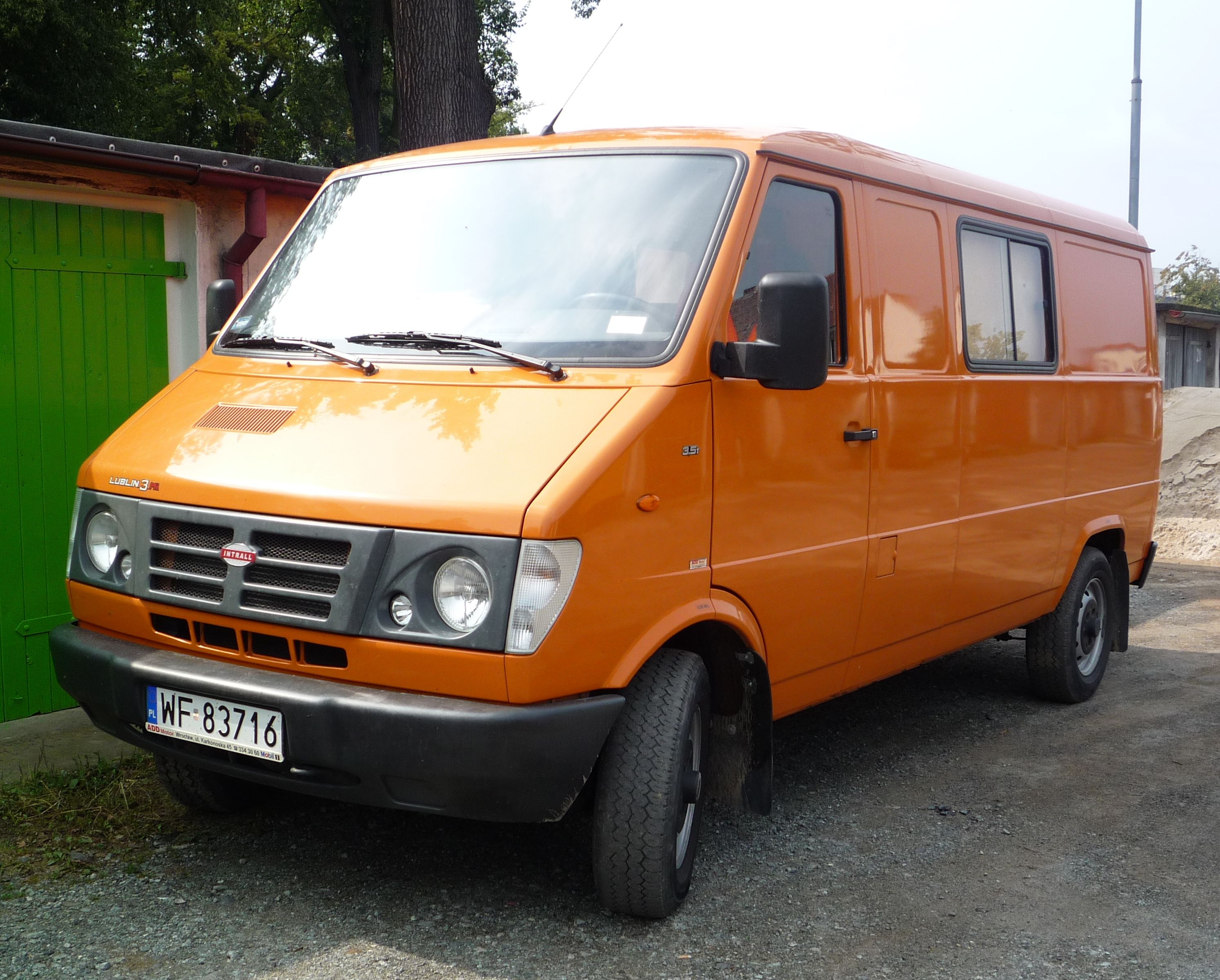
Intrall Lublin 3Mi

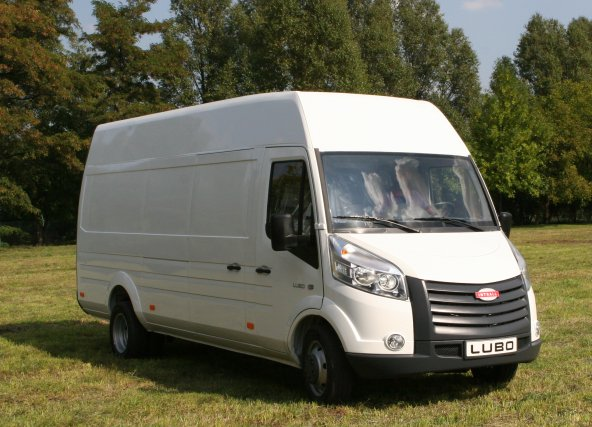
Intrall Lubo prototype

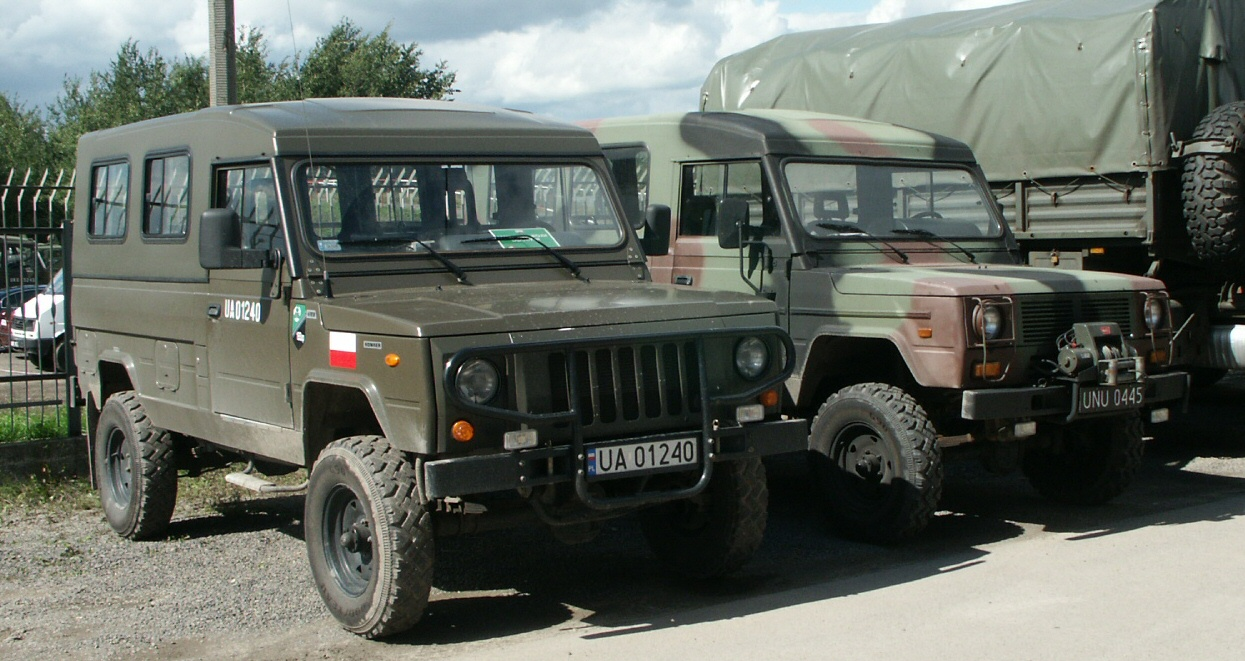
Honker 2000

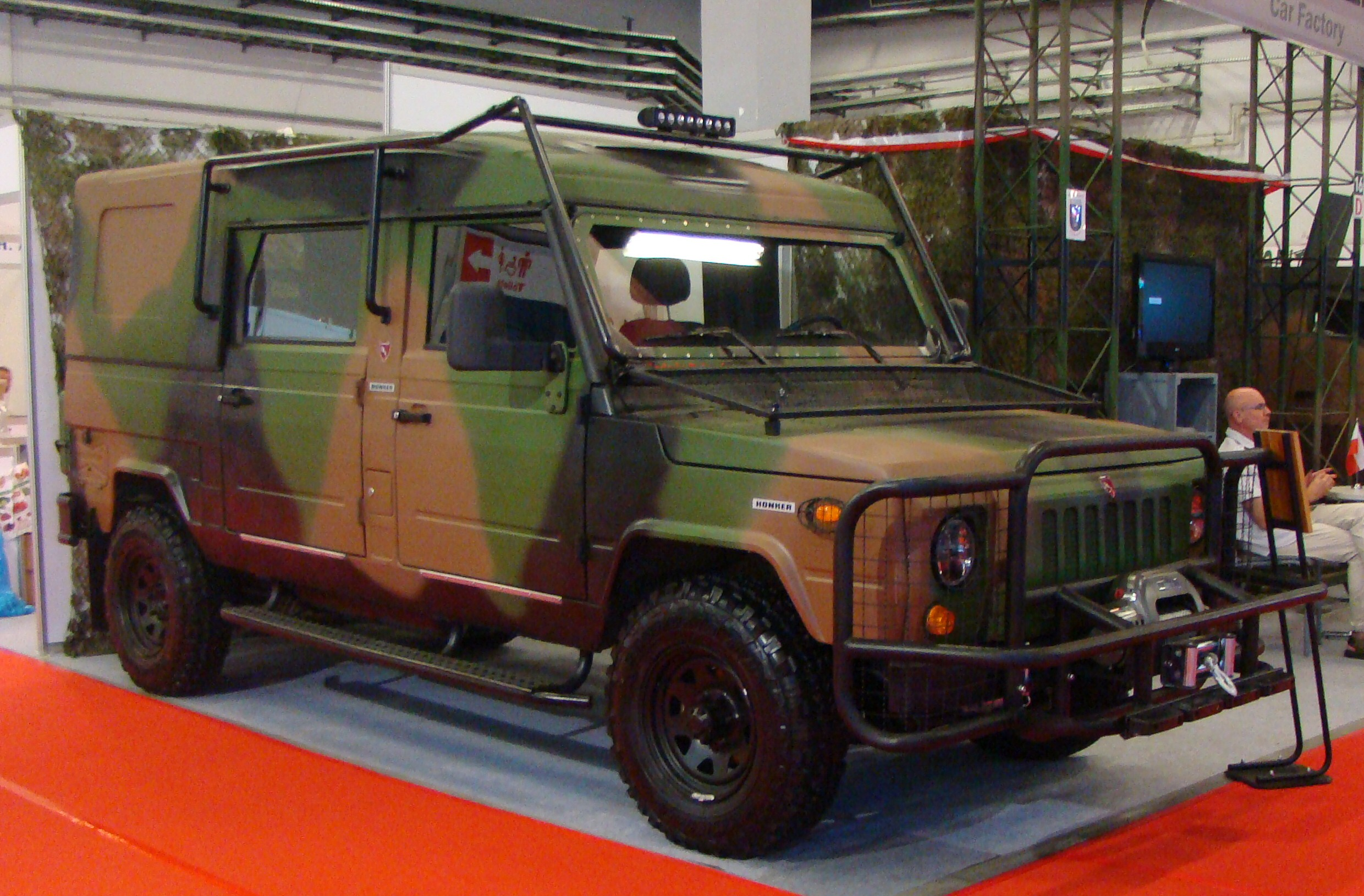
Honker 5-door

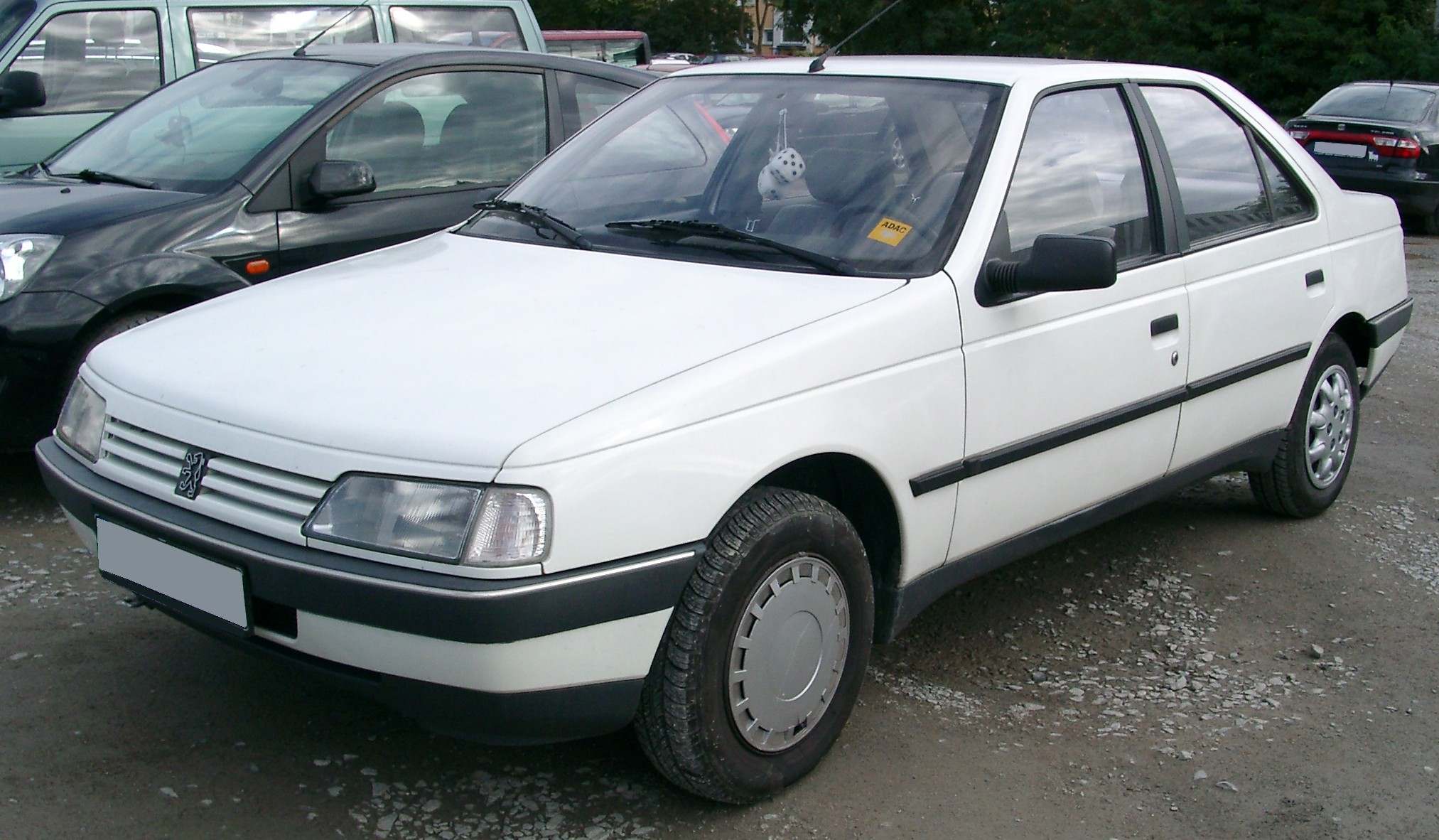
Peugeot 405

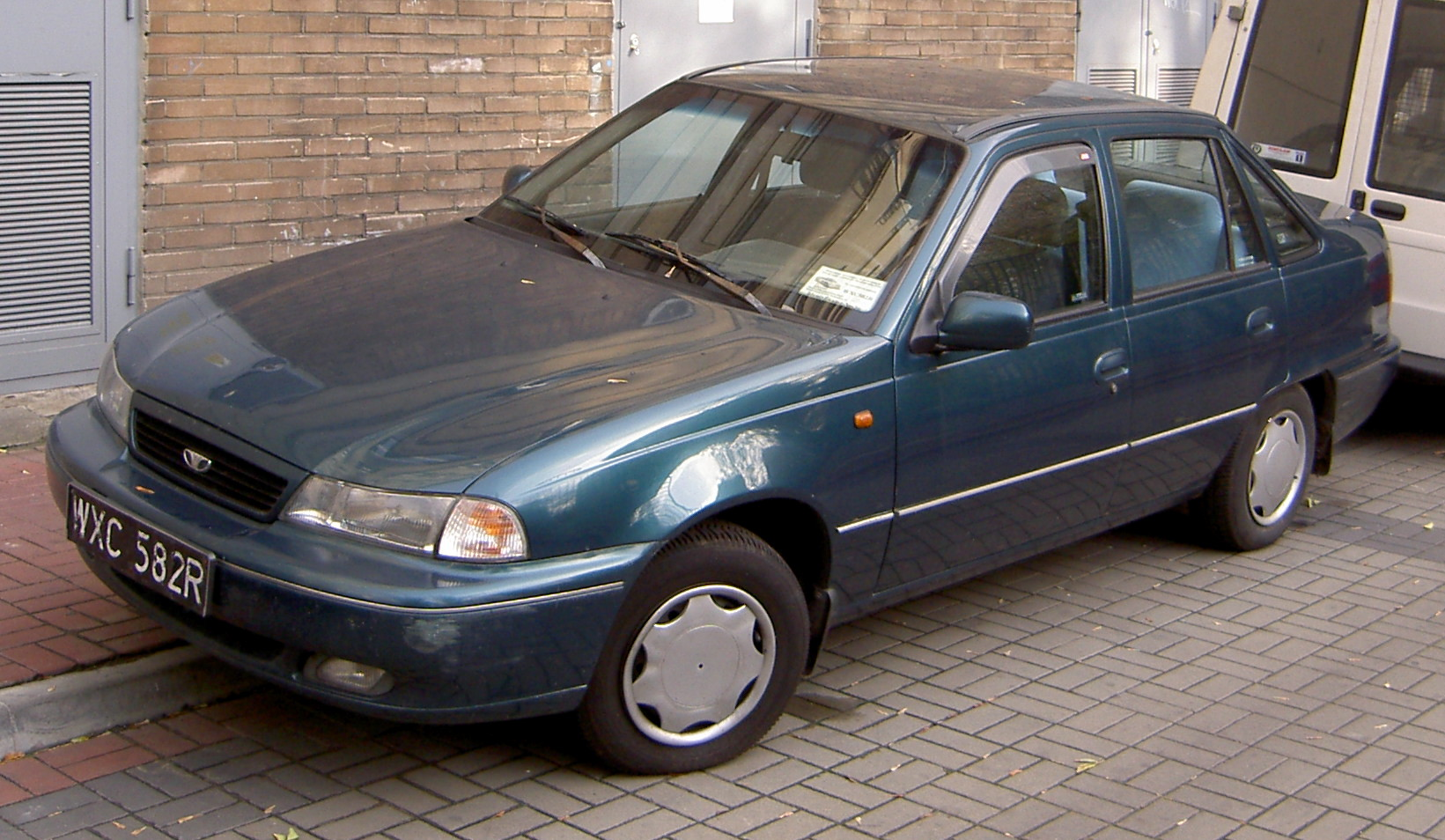
Daewoo Nexia

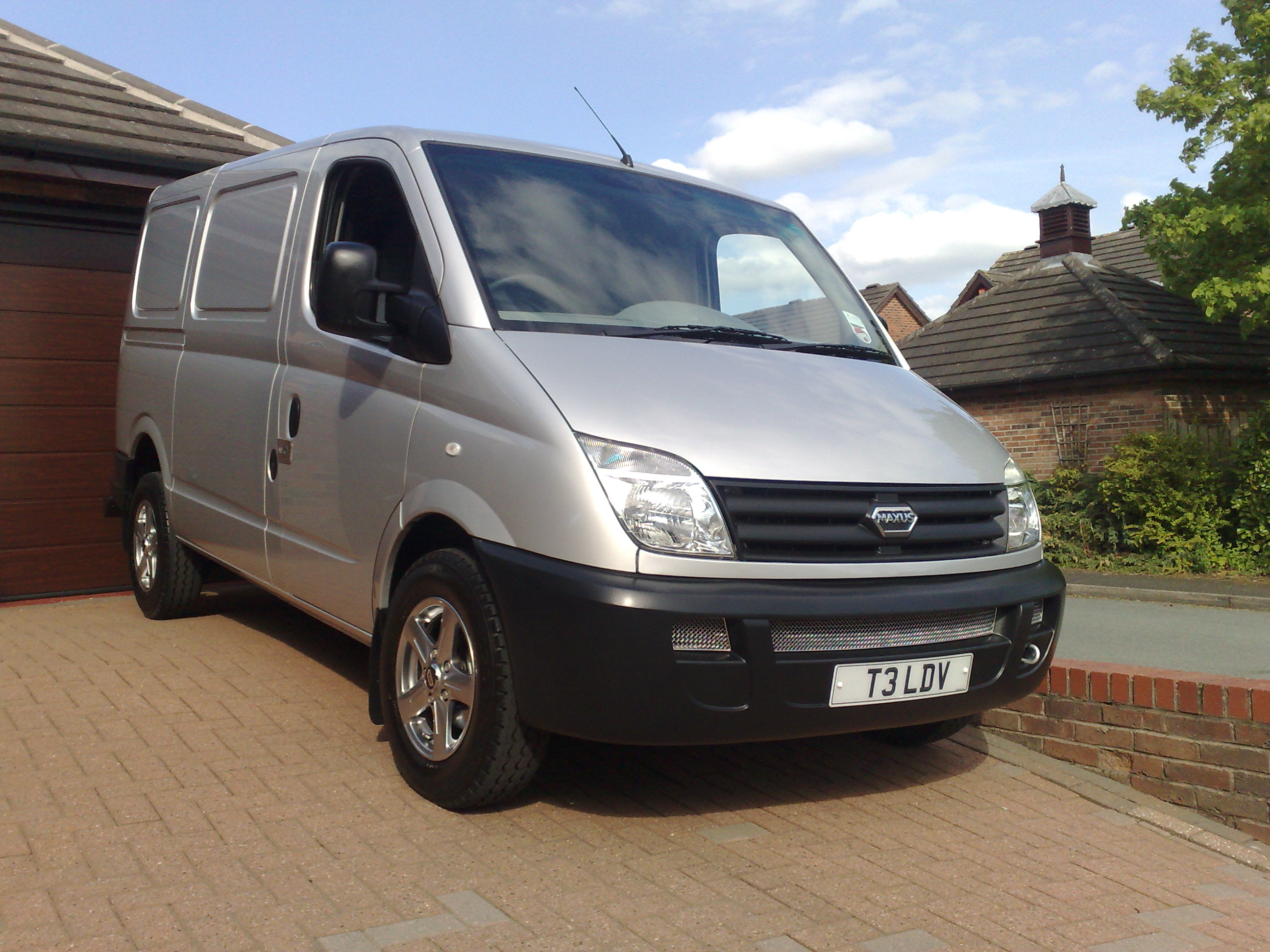
LDV Maxus based on the LD 100 design

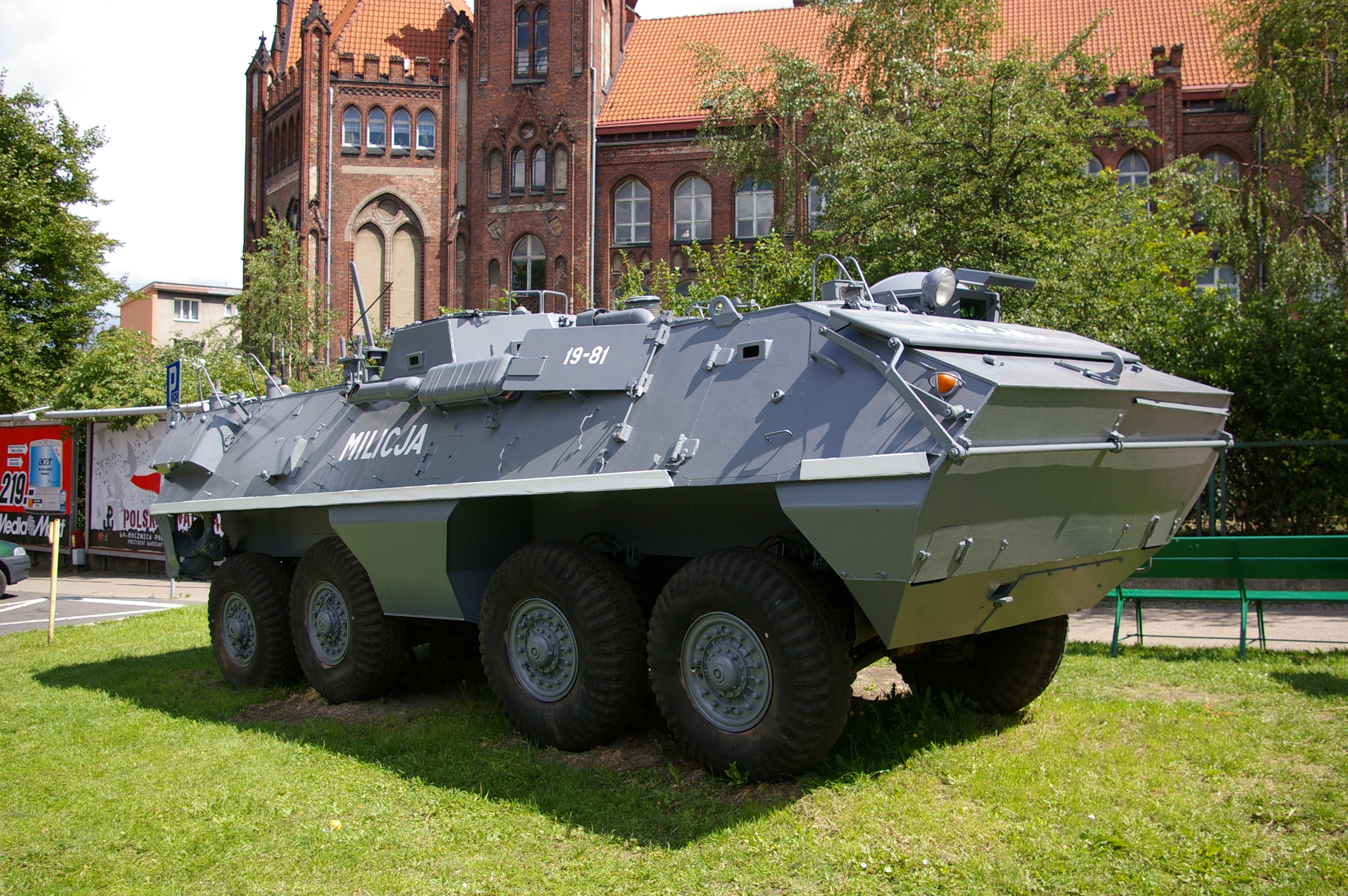
OT-64 SKOT

In 1991, the name of the plant was changed from Truck Factory to Automobile Factory in Lublin, and from then on, cars produced by the Lublin factory (Żuk, and later Lublin) were produced under the FS brand. In 1993, the production of Lublin 33 delivery vehicles began and, as part of a joint-venture, the company began assembling the Peugeot 405 car. In the following years, the following were assembled: 1993 – 1,100 pieces, 1994 – 1,679 pieces, 1995 – 1,023 pieces.

On March 14, 1995, a preliminary agreement was signed with the South Korean conglomerate Daewoo to establish a company based on the Lublin Car Factory. The agreement with the Asian partner was initiated on June 27, and the operations of the new entity "Daewoo Motor Polska" began on October 31, 1995. The Korean side became the majority shareholder, including the Lublin plant in the structures of Daewoo. The Semi Knock Down standard included, among others: Nexia models (November 1995 - April 1998), Musso (September 1998 - 2001) and Korando (late 1998 - 2000).

From 1998–2001, 50% of the shares of the British company LDV belonged to Daewoo Motor Polska . Together with the British design office (ex IAD), work began on the successor of the Lublin 3, which resulted in the creation of the LD 100 prototype, the rights and equipment for which were later purchased by the LDV company, giving it the name LDV Maxus.

After the collapse of Daewoo in the Polish market in 2001, the factory was taken over on lease from the trustee by Andoria SA. The design of the production-ready Maxus had to be sold (the buyer turned out to be the British company LDV ) to pay off the debts. In 2003, Andoria transferred production to the company "Intrall Polska Sp. z o. o., owned by the British-Russian concern Intrall.

In 2007, nearly 500 people were employed at the former FS in Lublin. At that time, the Intrall Lublin 3Mi model was produced - previously the Lublin II and 3 were produced. Work on the successor of the Lublin, called Lubo, was well advanced. On October 15, 2007, the district court announced the bankruptcy of Intrall Polska. In mid-April 2008, efforts to produce Honker and Lublin began.

In January 2009, the Warsaw company "Igma - special and armored vehicles" and DZT Tymińscy entered the agreement. The negotiations lasted several months, during which time Igma withdrew from the talks. Finally, in May 2009, DZT Tymińscy purchased from the bankruptcy trustee of Daewoo Motor Polska the rights to produce Honker and Lublin cars as well as the branches of the former DMP plants necessary for car production.

The production of a modernized Lublin delivery van called Pasagon was undertaken by DZT Tymińscy in 2011, after taking over the production lines of the former DMP. The new car was available in panel van, chassis, flatbed and station wagon versions, and featured a completely new front end, more comfortable seats and a redesigned frame. It also has a modernized Andoria engine meeting Euro IV standards. Ultimately, the manufacturer intended to produce 10,000 cars a year, also for export, and employ 350 people at the factory.

In 2009, DZT Tymińscy also won the bid to take over the company's assets. It paid PLN 43 million for Daewoo's property, and together with the rights to the car, the company also purchased, including the assembly, paint, welding and stamping facilities, as well as the research and development center. In the announcement of the bid for the purchase of the rights to the production of Honker and the assets of DMP, several conditions were imposed on the future buyer, including: continuation of Honker production in Poland, based on domestic entrepreneurs; continuation of car production at the plant in Lublin; carrying over employees involved in car production; implementation of supply contracts and warranty contracts concluded with customers by the current manufacturer; ensuring the supply of spare parts and assemblies in the quantities ordered by customers during the period of 10 years of vehicle operation; acquisition of materials and semi-finished products for the production of Honker and tools for car production. The plant also prepared a specialized car for the copper ore mine (KGHM).

Moreover, from 2011 to 2014, Ursus SA assembled Chinese ZX Grand Tiger pick-ups in Lublin (on the premises of the former FSC).

Since 2012, Honker 4 X 4 and Honker Cargo have been produced in the former FSC in Lublin. These vehicles are manufactured by Fabryka Samochodów Honker Sp. z o. o., owned by DZT Tymińscy SJ.

== Factory Timeline ==
- 1938 in September - commencement of construction of a new facility of the Lilpop, Rau i Loewenstein company on the outskirts of Lublin, which was expected to begin the production of engines, rear axles and steering systems; (the outbreak of the war ended these intentions) the creation of an assembly hall for passenger cars and trucks - based on a license from the American company Chevrolet (General Motors).
- 1948 - the decision to establish a factory in Lublin at the Unification Congress of the PPS and PPR.
- 1950 – construction of the Truck Factory in Lublin begins .
- 1951 - On November 7, the first FSC Lublin-51 vehicles are manufactured in the Lublin factory.
- 1954 - in April, the standards department was opened and production began.
- 1956 - the forge was put into operation.
- 1958 – launch of FSC Żuk car production .
- 1959 - production began in the wheel and spring department.
- 1963 - in October, in cooperation with the Czech company Avia, production of SKOT armored personnel carriers began.
- 1971 - in July, production of SKOT armored personnel carriers ended.
- 1973 - incorporation of Fabryka Samochodów Rolniczych from Antoninek (Greater Poland Voivodeship) and the rights to produce Tarpan into the FSC.
- 1973 - FSC's share in the domestic market increased to 44.5%.
- 1980 – FSC Lublin employees take part in the Lublin July strikes.
- 1991 - the name of the plant was changed from Truck Factory to Automobile Factory in Lublin, and from then on, cars produced by the Lublin factory (Żuk, and later Lublin) were under the FS brand.
- 1993 - an agreement was signed with the Peugeot concern, under which the assembly of Peugeot 405 cars in the semi knocked down system began . Production of the successor to the FS Żuk car began, and was named FS Lublin 33.
- 1995 - after assembling 3,802 Peugeot 405 cars, cooperation with the Peugeot concern ended. In June, FS Lublin signs with the companies "Daewoo Corporation" and "Daewoo Heavy Industries Co." joint-venture agreement with South Korea. In October, the company "Daewoo Motor Polska Sp. z o. o., which continued the production of FS Żuk and FS Lublin cars. At the same time, modernization works were undertaken on Lublin cars. In November, the company started assembling Korean Daewoo Nexia passenger cars using the SKD system .
- 1996 - assembly of Avia and LDV cars began in the semi knocked down system, and the right to industrial production of the Honker car was purchased from FSR Poznań.
- 1997 - production of Lublin vans was launched, production of the Daewoo Lublin II and Honker cars began,
- 1998 - On February 13, the production of FS Żuk cars was ended, a total of 587,500 cars were produced. In the first quarter, the assembly of Nexia cars was completed, a total of 40,880 cars were assembled. The assembly of Musso and Korando passenger and off-road cars began in the SKD system (1,059 units were assembled by 2001).
- 1999 - assembly of Avia and LDV cars was completed, a total of 3,500 cars were assembled. The production of "Daewoo Lublin 3" cars began.
- 2001 – bankruptcy of Daewoo Motor Polska Sp. z o. o
- 2002 - Diesel Engine Plant ANDORIA SA from Andrychów leases the production infrastructure for car production, the production of Lublin 3 and Honker cars with 4C90 engines from Andrychów was resumed.
- 2003 - On September 22, International Truck Alliance Limited with its registered office in London, Great Britain, acquires the rights to sell and produce delivery vehicles, and on November 28, it establishes and registers "Intrall Polska Sp. z o. o.
- 2004 - On January 1, production of Lublin 3 and Honker cars was resumed.
- 2005 - sales of the Intrall Lublin 3Mi car began.
- 2006 - On September 15, the premiere of the new Lubo delivery vehicle took place at the plant
- 2006 - in February, a new model of the Honker 2006 off-road vehicle was created.
- 2006 - in April "International Truck Alliance Ltd.", owner of "INTRALL Polska Sp. z o. o. acquires assets, intellectual rights and the trademark "PRAGA Čáslav" as well as the rights to sell and produce trucks in Prague (Czech Republic). In September, at the Internationale Automobil Ausstellung 2006 automotive fair in the German city of Hannover, Intrall Polska Sp. z o. o. presented a new family of Lubo delivery vehicles designed and created by the Research and Development Center Intrall Polska Sp. z o.o.
- 2007 - production was ended in the spring, and on October 15, the District Court in Lublin announced the bankruptcy of the "Intrall Polska" company, which produced Lublin 3Mi delivery vans and Honker off-road vehicles .
- 2009 - the DZT Tymińscy company started the production of Honker cars .
- 2010 - On September 16, the premiere of the modernized Lublin - the DZT Pasagon car - took place . Series production starts on January 3, 2011.
- 2011 - On December 20, POL-MOT Warfama SA (today Ursus SA) launches an assembly plant for Ursus agricultural tractors in a separate part of the factory . From 2011 to 2014, the same company assembled licensed Chinese ZX Grand Tiger pickup trucks at the factory. The Mayor of Lublin, Krzysztof Żuk, drove the first tractor off the production line.
- 2012 - in September, the DZT Tymińscy company decided to change the name of the company from Fabryka Samochodów Ciężarowych w Lublinie to Fabryka Samochodów Honker Sp. z o. o. She also noted that off-road vehicles and delivery vans will be produced from now on under the Honker brand. At the end of the summer, sales of the Honker Cargo car (formerly DZT Pasagon and Honker Van) began. By the end of September, 48 units were registered.

== Factory CEOs ==
- 1950-1954 – K. Gielewski
- 1954-1956 – H. Sztraj
- 1956-1957 – B. Brajte
- 1957-1958 – Z. Nawrocki
- 1958-1959 – A. Brykalski
- 1960-1962 – W. Kwiatkowski
- 1962-1974 – G. Krupa
- 1974-1982 – H. Pawłowski
- 1982-1985 – H. Jasiński
- 1985-1987 – A. Malinowski
- 1988-1995 – Z. Prus
- 1996-1997 – W. Włoch

== Employment ==
Employment in a factory in Lublin. The forecast assumed up to 20,000. people.

- 1966 – 8 thousand
- 1969 – 10 thousand
- 1973 – 13 thousand (1,300 engineers and technicians)
- 1977 – 10 thousand
- 1980 – 12 thousand
- 1981 – 14 thousand
- 1984 – 10 thousand
- 1995 – 6 thousand
- 2001 – 1725
- 2007 – 500
- 2013 – 170 (Honker Car Factory), 3 thousand (the entire area of the former FSC)

== Current products ==
- Lublin van/Honker Cargo (1993–2007, 2011–2016)

== Former products ==
From 1963 to 1970 the company manufactured (together with a factory in Czechoslovakia) the armoured personnel carrier OT-64 SKOT. Around 4,500 were produced for the Polish and Czechoslovak armies as well as export customers.

Some of the vehicles produced at the factory:

- FSC A-30/40 (1968–1973)
- FSC Lublin-51 (1951–1959)
- FSC Żuk (1959–1998)
- Lubo (2006 prototype)
- Peugeot 405 (1993-1995)
- Daewoo Nexia (1995–1998)
- Honker 4×4 (1996–2016)
