= FSC Lublin =

FSC Lublin Daewoo Lublin Andoria Lublin Intrall Lublin DZT Pasagon Honker Cargo/Van
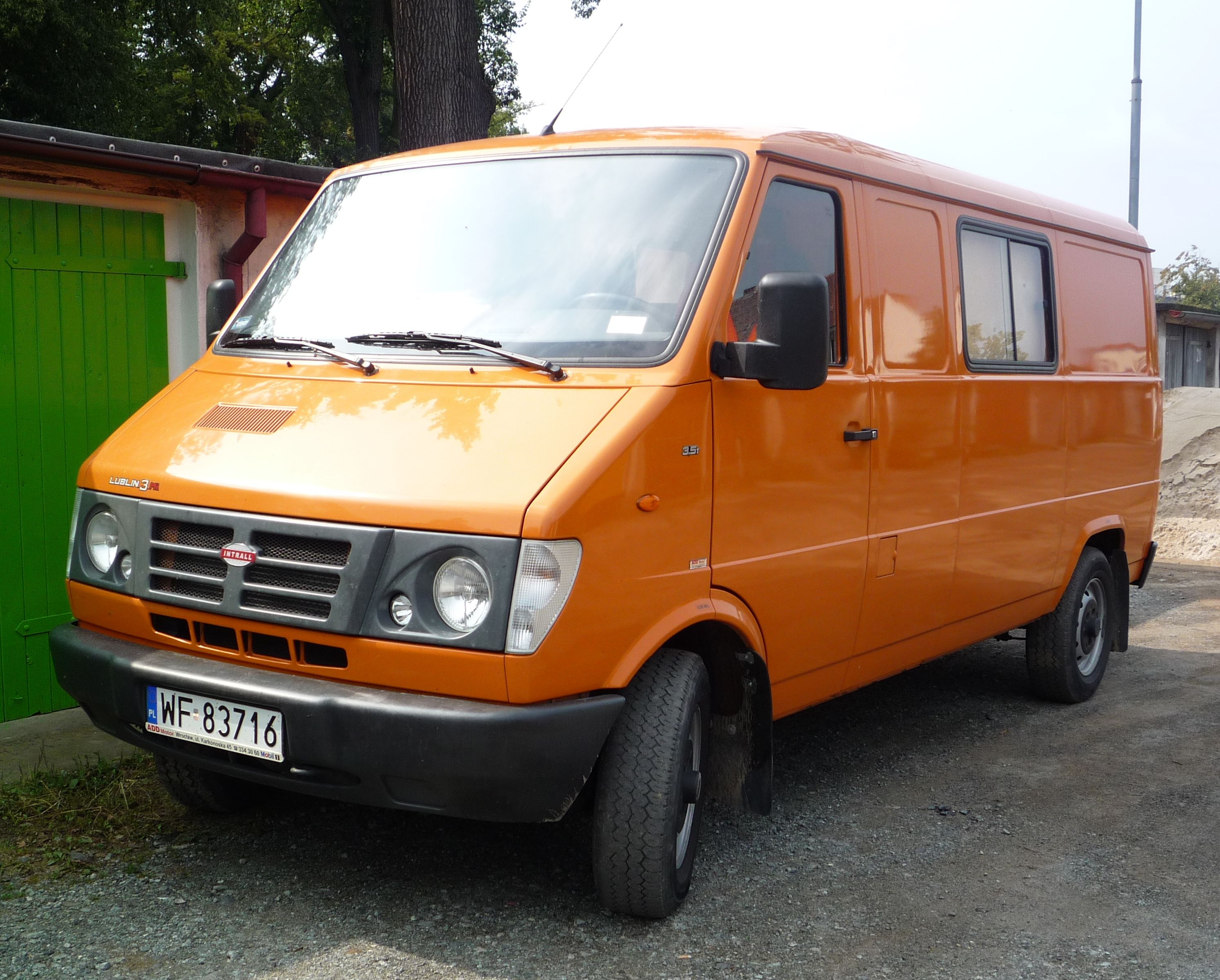
- Intrall Lublin 3Mi

Overview
- Manufacturer: FSC; Daewoo; Andoria-Mot; Intrall; DZT/Honker; Avia; BelAZ; Unison
- Also called: Daewoo Lublin II; Daewoo Lublin 3 Intrall L3
- Production: 1993–2007; 2011–2013
- Assembly: Poland: Lublin; Czech Republic: Prague; Belarus: Apčak; Romania: Craiova

Body and chassis
- Class: Light commercial vehicle (M)
- Body style: 6-door panel van 6-door van 2-door pickup truck 6-door minibus 2-door chassis
- Layout: Front-engine, rear-wheel-drive

Powertrain
- Engine: Petrol: 2.0 L GM MPFI; 2.2 L GM C22 NED; Diesel: 2.4 L Andoria 4C90; 2.4 L Andoria 4CT90; 2.4 L Andoria 4CTi90; 2.6 L Andoria ADCR; 2.8 L Iveco 8140.43S
- Transmission: 4/5-speed manual

Dimensions
- Wheelbase: 2,900 mm (114.2 in); 3,433 mm (135.2 in); 3,750 mm (147.6 in)
- Length: 4,770 mm (187.8 in); 4,870 mm (191.7 in)
- Width: 2,260 mm (89.0 in)
- Height: 2,320 mm (91.3 in); 2,250 mm (88.6 in)

Chronology
- Predecessor: FSC Żuk; ZSD Nysa
- Successor: LDV Maxus; Fiat Ducato (indirect, in Ukraine, Romania, Poland, Middle Europe)

The FSC Lublin is a light commercial van produced by the Polish automaker FSC in Lublin. Production started in 1993, and was intended to replace the aging Żuk, which was finally discontinued in 1998.

The van, known as the Lublin 33 was produced until 1995, when Daewoo Motors took control of FSC and renamed it as Lublin II. In 1999 the Lublin III was put into production. After the Daewoo Group bankruptcy, the future of the Lublin brand looked bleak.

In 2001 the brand Lublin was sold to a British company, Truck Alliance. Later the brand was owned by Intrall Polska, a Russo-British company, and the van was sold under the name Intrall Lublin. Later the rights to the model were acquired by DZT Tymińscy, which manufactured a small batch of them under Pasagon with a modernized frame and slight changes to the front of the vehicle, made to accommodate a larger engine meeting Euro 5 standards. Later they tried to sell it again under the name of Honker Cargo but with no success.

During the later 2000s, Daewoo Motors would enter a joint venture with LDV Limited to develop a new commercial vehicle that would replace both the Lublin II and the old LDV Convoy range, however following GM's acquisition of Daewoo, LDV secured the exclusive rights to the vehicle, purchased the tooling, and moved it from Daewoo's plant in Lublin, Poland to the LDV site in Washwood Heath, Birmingham. The vehicle was eventually launched as the LDV Maxus in 2004.

== Gallery ==
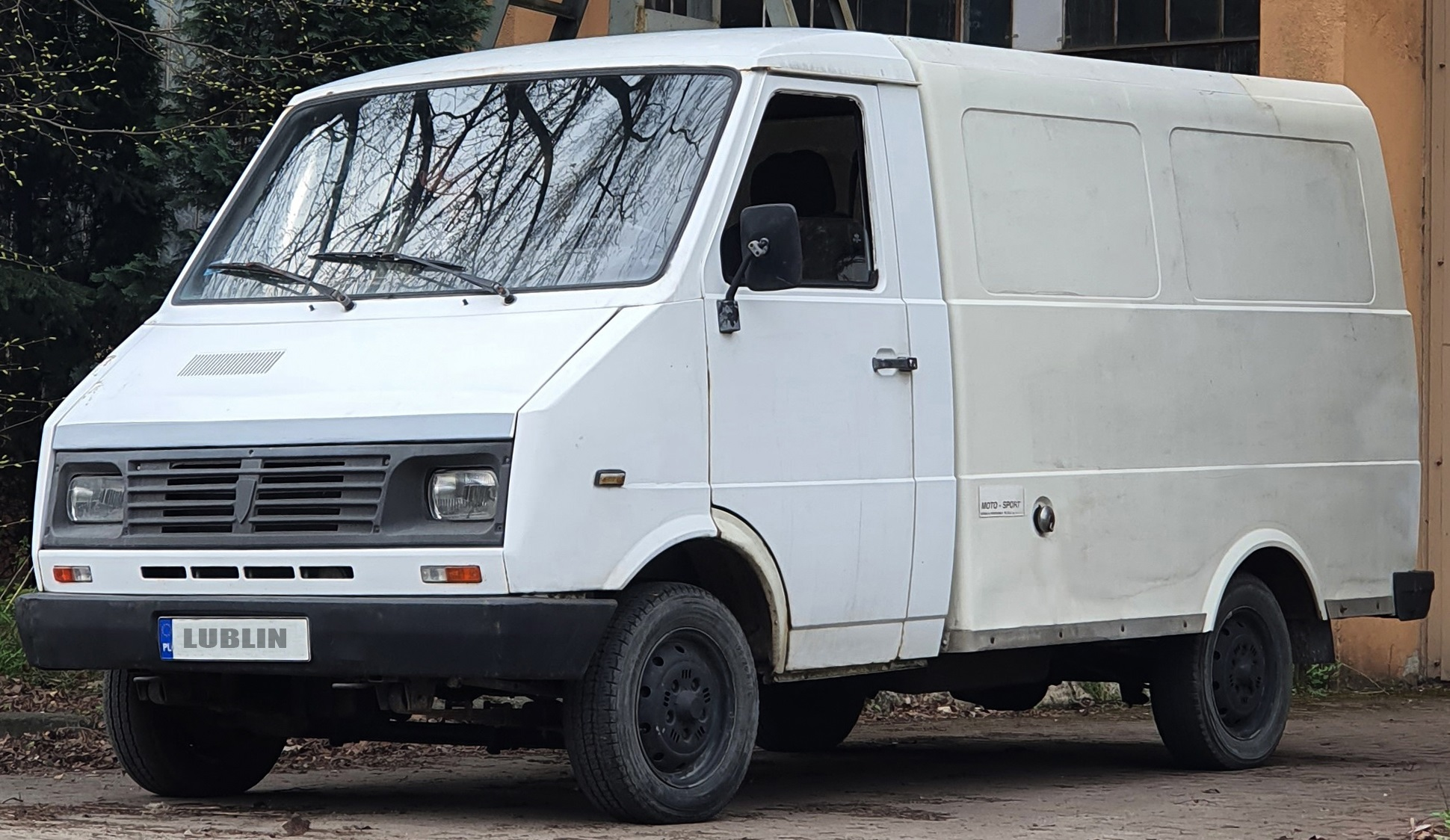
FS Lublin 3392

FS Lublin 33

Daewoo Lublin 3

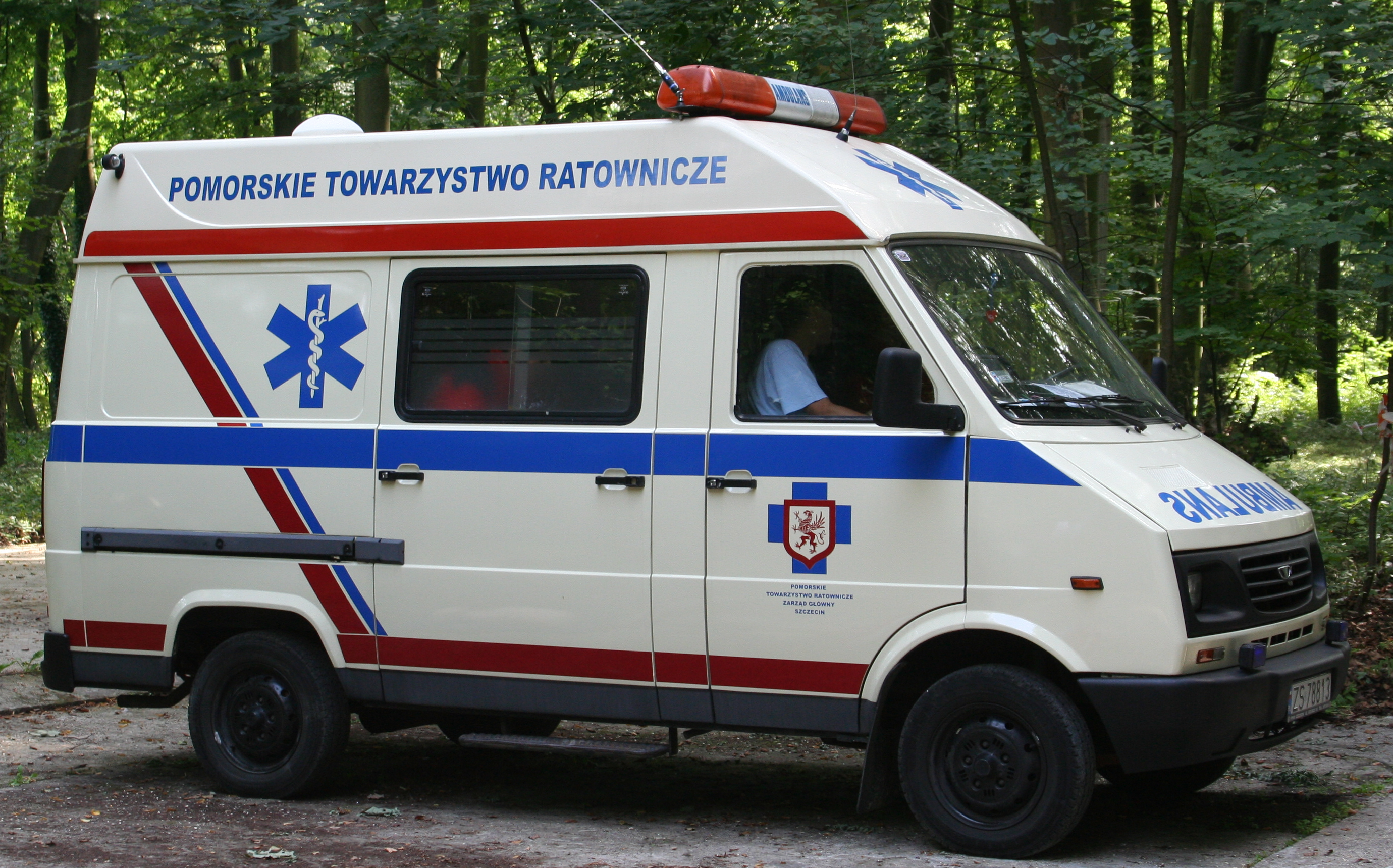
FSC Lublin ambulance

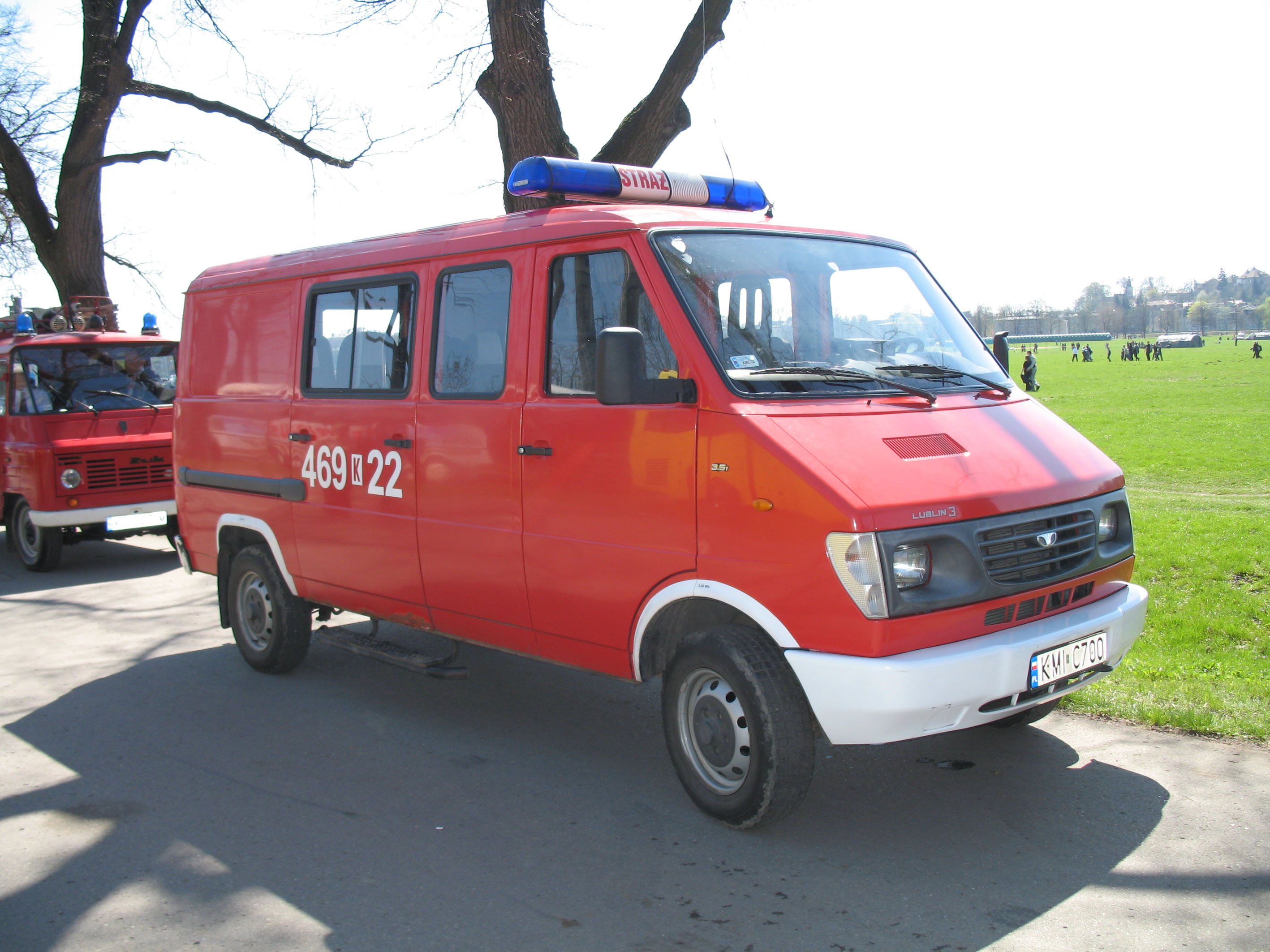
FSC Lublin fire van

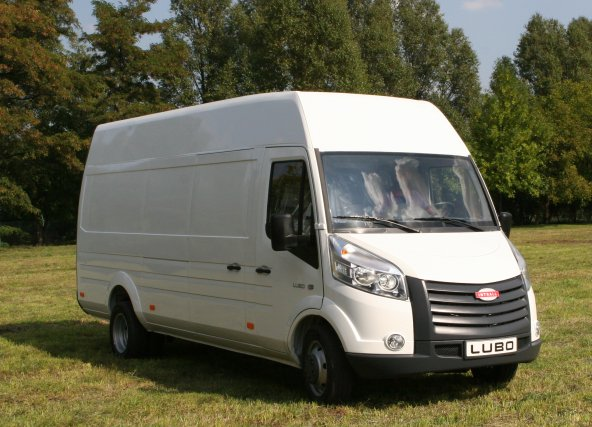
The Intrall Lubo was to be launched from the end of 2008.
