= FSC A-30/40 =

Polish prototype van

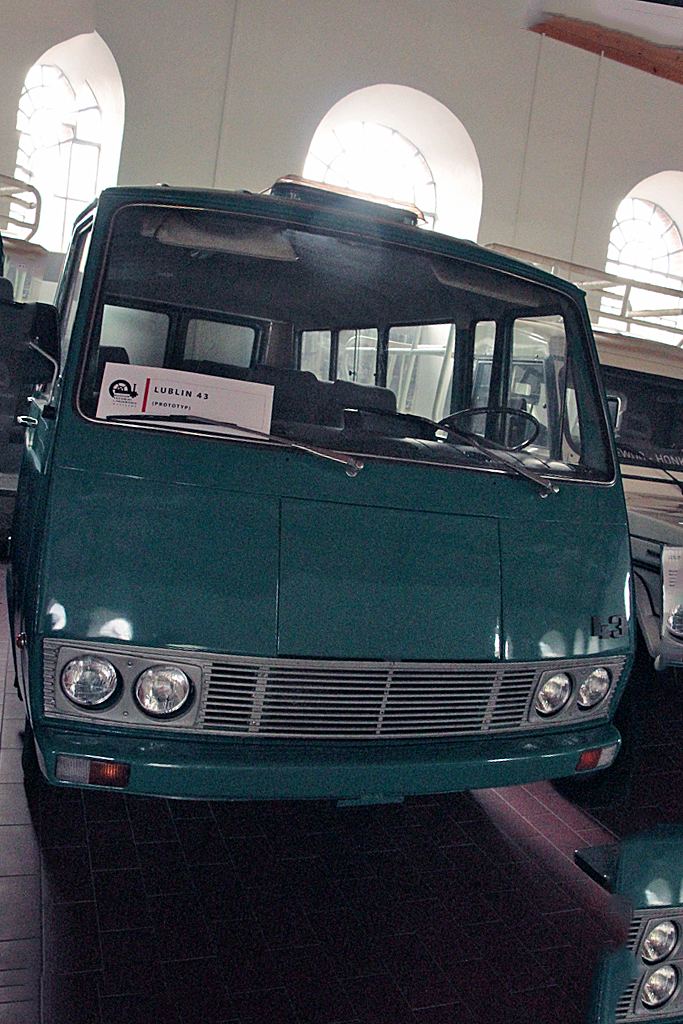

Overview
- Manufacturer: FSC
- Production: 1968–1973 (prototypes only)
- Assembly: Lublin, Poland

Body and chassis
- Class: Light commercial vehicle (M); Off-road capable van
- Body style: Cab over engine
- Layout: Front-engine, front-wheel-drive / four-wheel drive
- Related: Polski Fiat 125p

The FSC A-30/40 was a Polish cab over van prototype made between 1968 and 1973 by FSC Lublin.

== History ==
Work on the successor of the Żuk and Nysa cars began in 1967. The new car was to be front - or four wheel drive, with a load capacity of 1400/1800 kg, depending on the version. The 30 series was powered by the Polski Fiat 125p engine, while the 40 series was powered by the S-21M engine (a modernized engine from the FSO Warszawa). There were planned versions: van, pickup truck, fire truck, minibus, specialist van, refrigerated truck, ambulance and off-road (4x4). The first three were to be produced in FSC Lublin, while the others in ZSD Nysa

In total, about 50 vehicles were made. Production on a larger scale was not undertaken. The implementation of the 30/40 family for high-volume production was associated with the necessity of large investment outlays

The only surviving prototype is in Museum of Technology in Warsaw.

== Versions ==
Main sources:

30 Series

A-30: Panel van with a load capacity of 1400 kg
A-32: Pick-up truck with a load capacity of 1200 kg
A-34: Fire truck
A-35: Ambulance

40 Series

A-40: Panel van with a load capacity of 1800 kg
A-42: Pick-up truck with a load capacity of 1800 kg
A-43: 16-seater minibus
A-45: Ambulance

== See also ==
- UAZ-452 - similar off-road capable van
- Barkas B 1000
- RAF-2203
- Rocar TV
- Škoda 1203
