= Intrall =

Defunct Polish truck company (2003–2007)

Intrall (International Truck Alliance)
- Industry: Automotive
- Predecessor: Daewoo Motor Poland
- Founded: 2003
- Defunct: 2007
- Headquarters: London, United Kingdom (headquarters); Poland (manufacturing)
- Products: Automobiles
- Website: www.intrall.ru

Intrall, or International Truck Alliance, was a Russo-British automotive company headquartered in London, United Kingdom with factories in Poland. In late 2003, the company was bought by Daewoo Motor Poland and operated under the name Intrall Polska (Intrall Poland) between 2004 and 2007.

The company produced FSC Lublin and Honker model trucks, and in 2006 received rights to manufacture Praga vehicles. In addition, the company designed and produced the Intrall Lubo line of mixed van/truck work vehicles.

In 2007, stricter engine emission regulations and the Polish government—a major Intrall customer—mandated all companies that supply the Polish Military must be at least half owned by Polish interests forced production to end. Later that year, the company was declared bankrupt by both London and Polish courts.

== Products ==
=== Intrall ===
- Intrall Lubo van/truck

=== Lublin vehicles ===
- Lublin Furgon all-metal van
- Lublin Furgon with raised roof
- Lublin Towas work van
- Lublin Kombi
- Lublin Skrzyniowy flatbed
- Lublin Brygadowy 4-door flatbed
- Lublin Kontener box body
- Lublin special vehicles
  - Police, fire and emergency vehicles

=== Honker vehicles ===
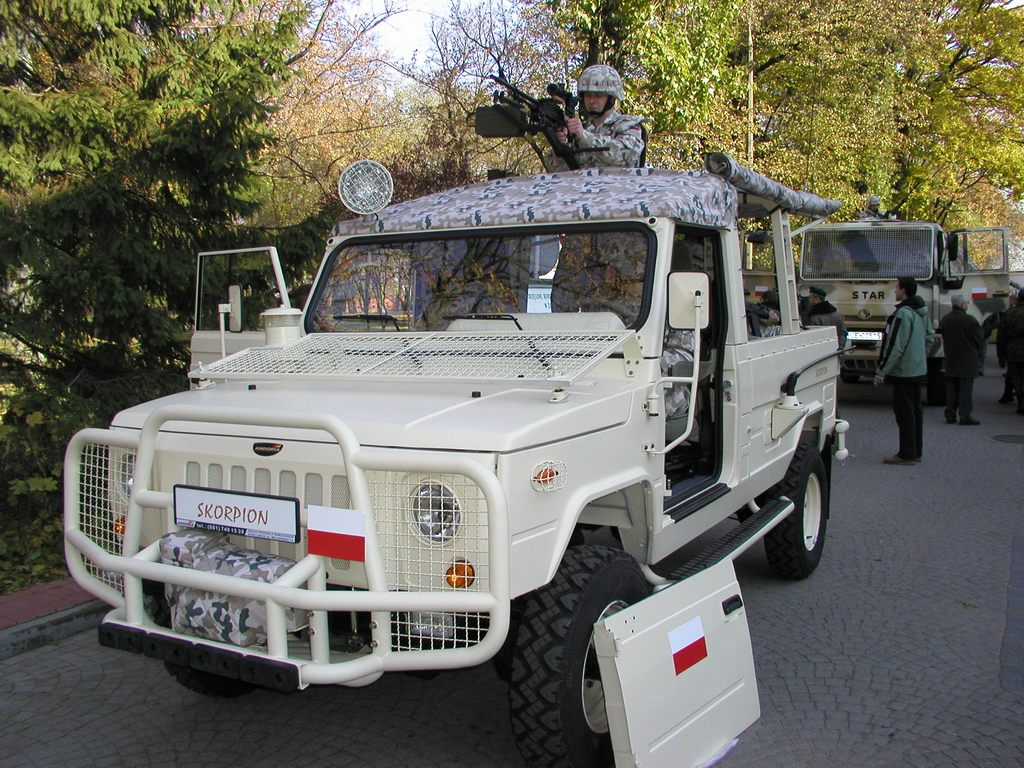
Honker Skorpion

- Honker hardtop
- Honker Softtop
- Honker Skorpion – desert patrol vehicle
- Honker Sibil – civil version of the Skorpion
- Honker special vehicles
  - Military ambulance

== Gallery ==
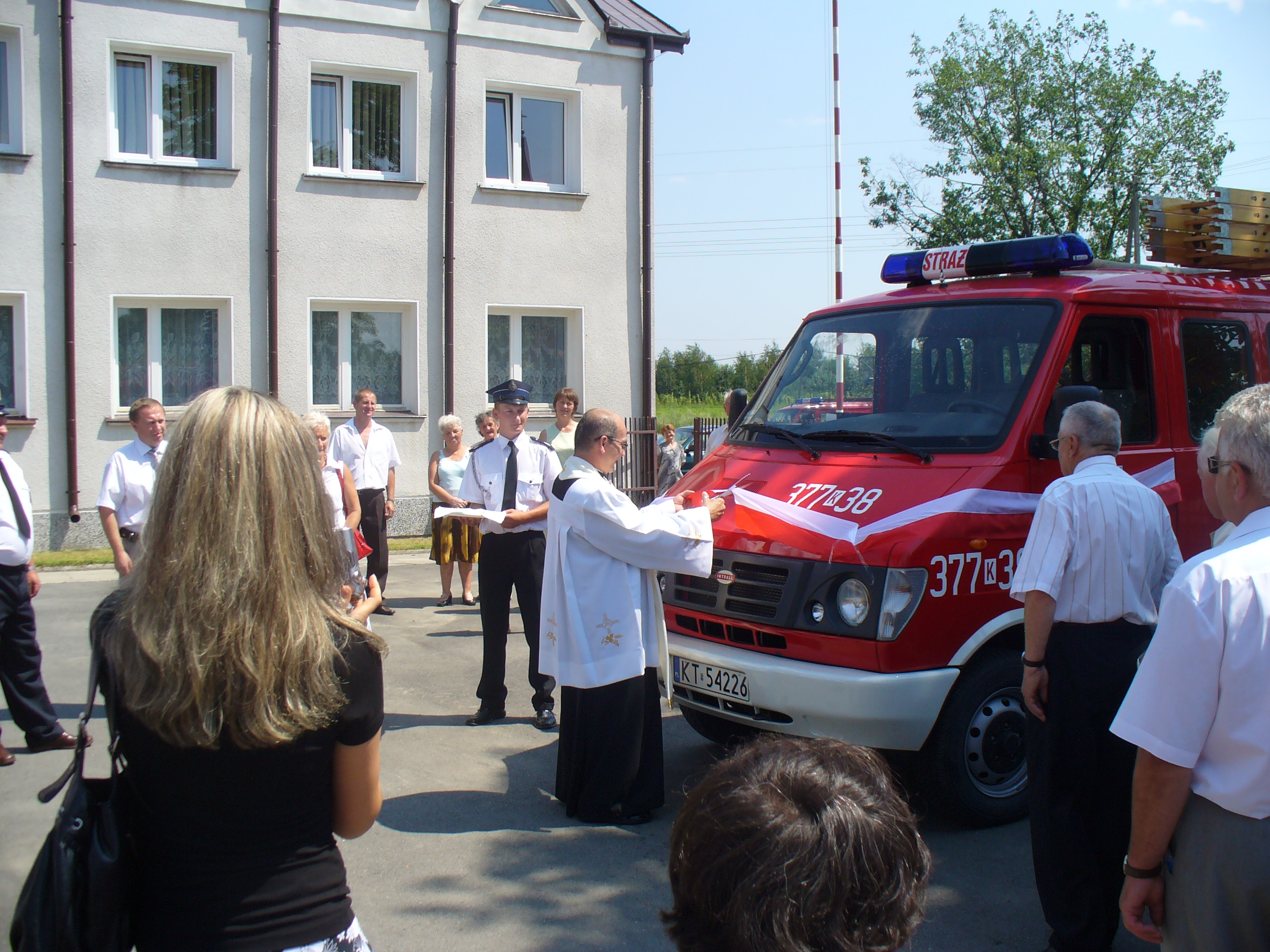
Intrall Lublin 3Mi-based fire engine

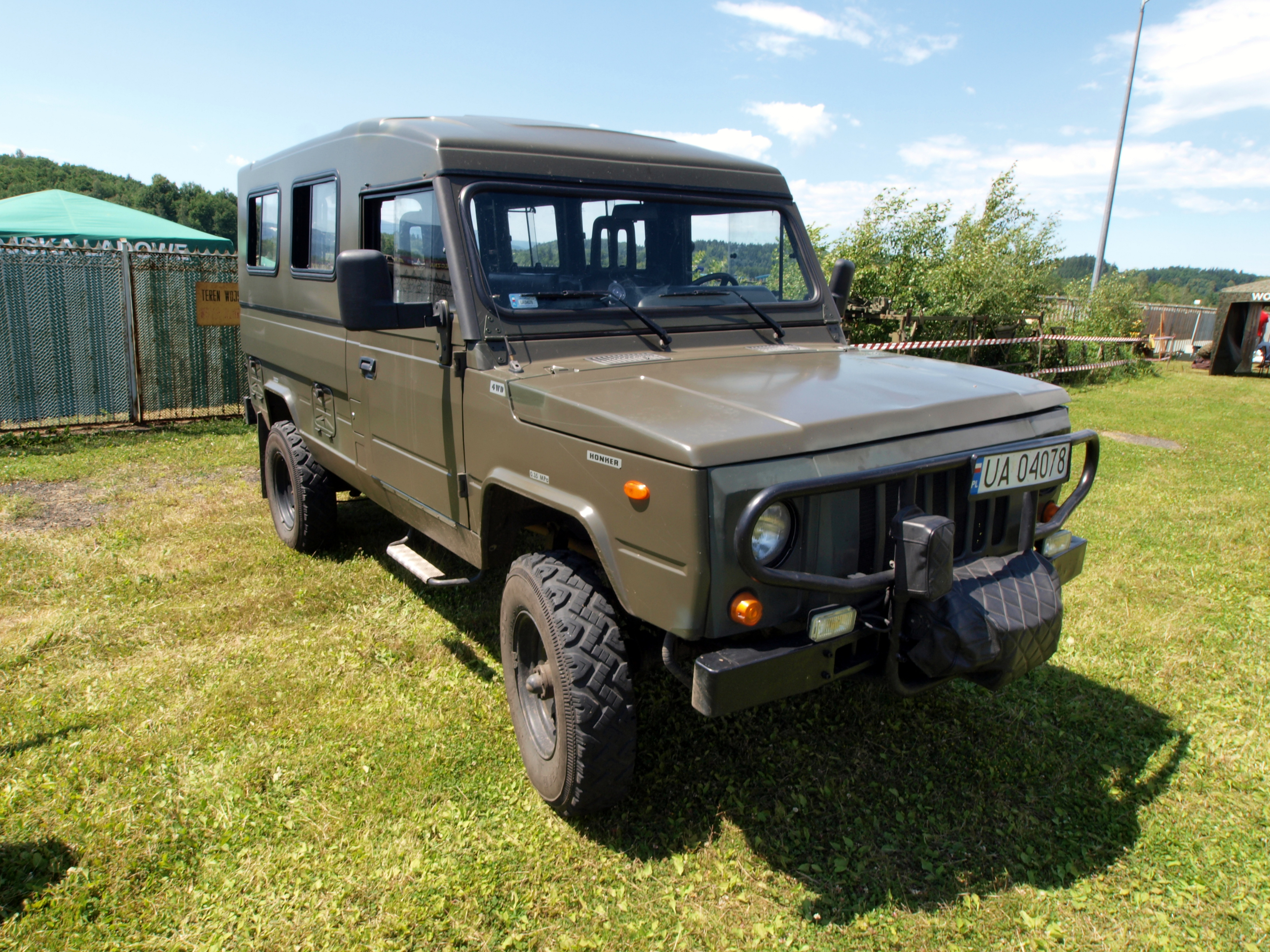
Honker

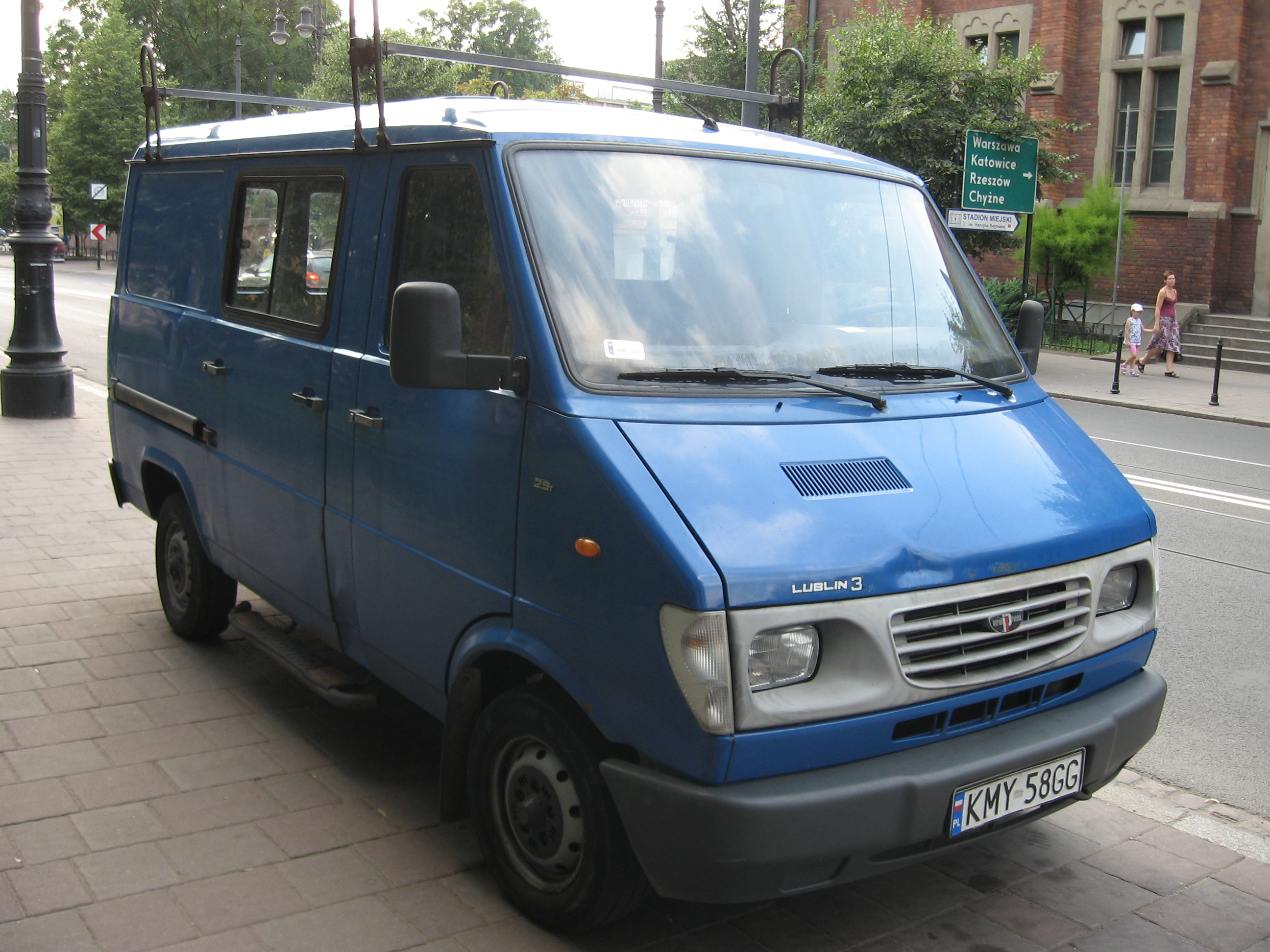
Intrall Lublin 3

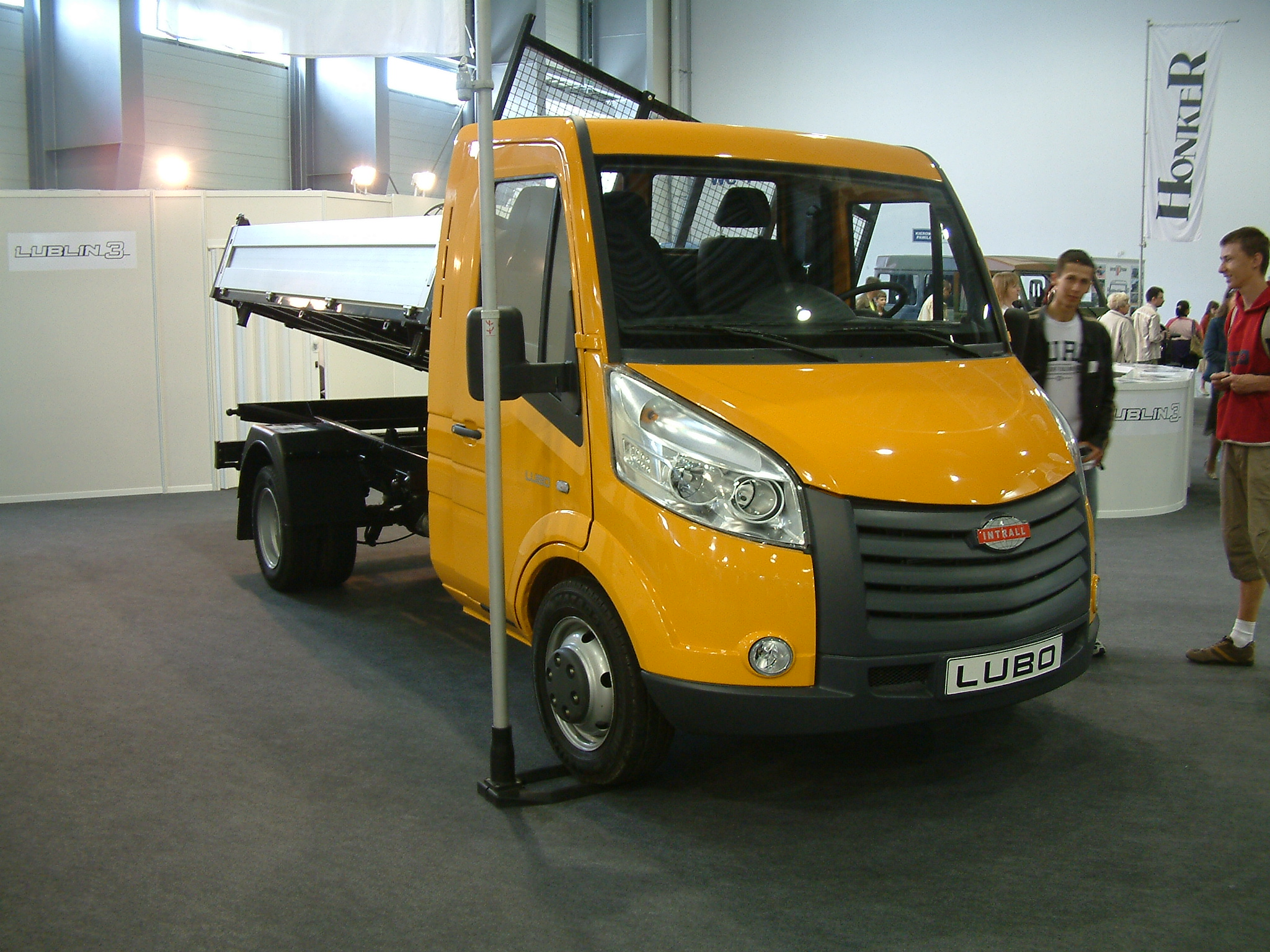
Intrall Lubo

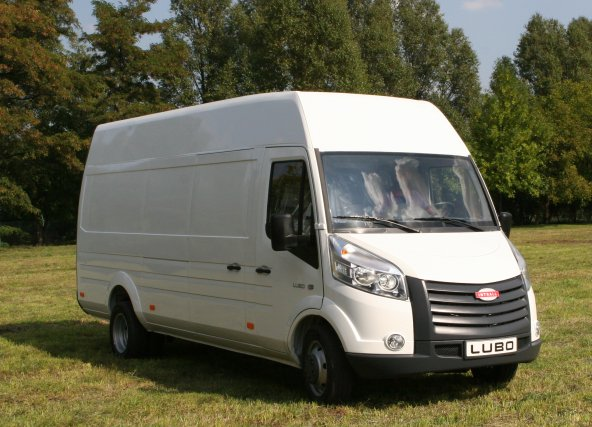
Intrall Lubo van

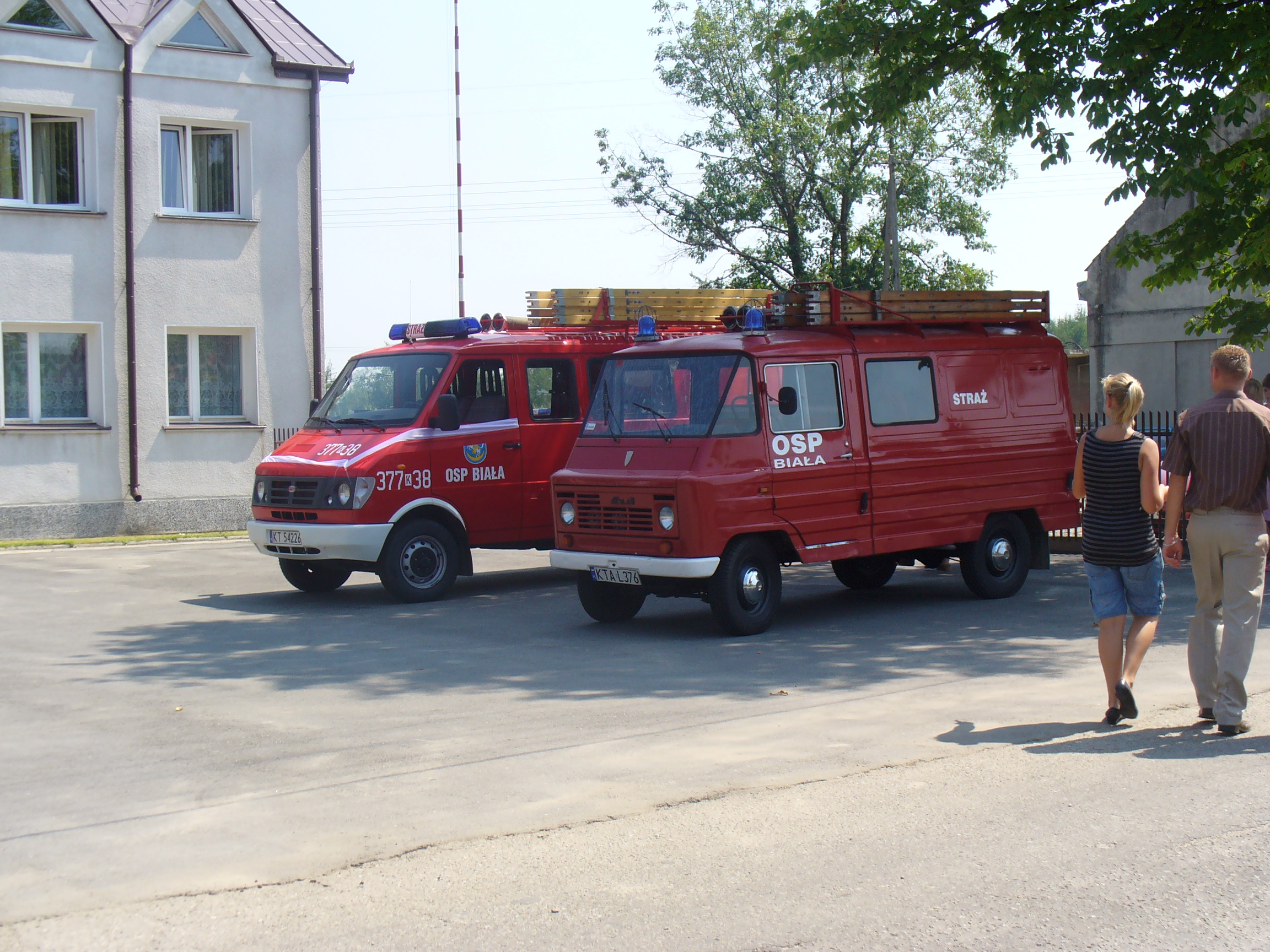
Intrall Lublin 3Mi-based fire engines

== See also ==
- Honker
