= Tarpan Honker =

Polish truck

Honker
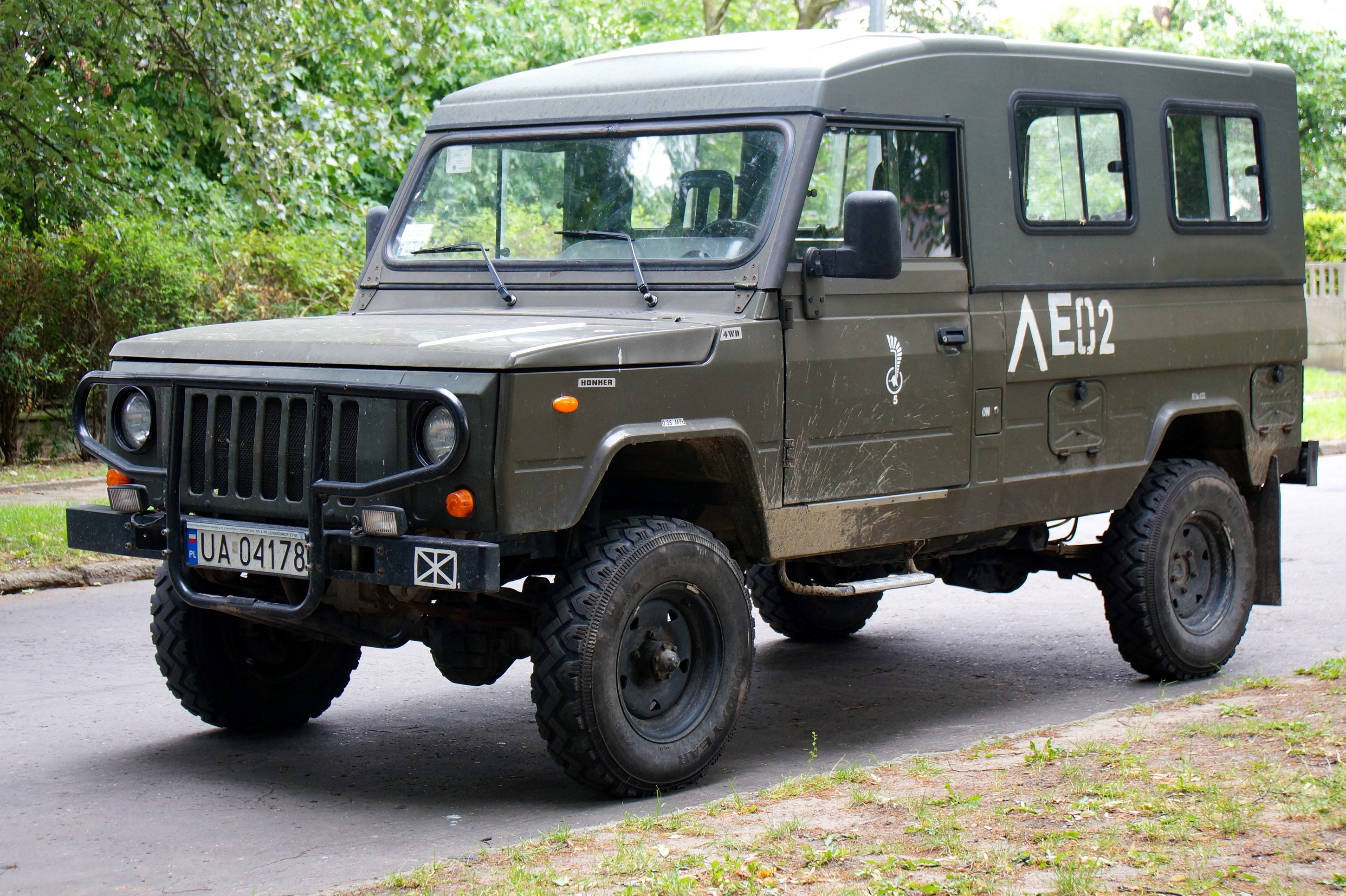

Overview
- Manufacturer: FSR (1988–1996); Daewoo Motor Polska (1996–2001); Andoria-Mot (2002–2003); Intrall (2003–2007); FS Honker (2009–2016); DZT Tymińscy
- Also called: FSR Tarpan Honker; Daewoo Honker; Andoria Honker; Intrall Honker; DZT Tymińscy Honker
- Production: 1988–2016
- Assembly: Poland: Poznań; Poland: Lublin

Body and chassis
- Class: Off-road vehicle
- Layout: 4x4

Powertrain
- Engine: 1.5 L OHV I4; 2.4 L Andoria 4C90 diesel I4; 2.4 L Andoria 4CT90/4CTi90 turbo I4; 2.5 L Sofim 8140.07/27 diesel I4

Dimensions
- Wheelbase: 2,827 mm (111 in)
- Length: 4,515–4,698 mm (178–185 in)
- Width: 1,935 mm (76 in)
- Height: 2,196 mm (86 in)
- Curb weight: 1,998–2,300 kg (4,405–5,071 lb)

Chronology
- Predecessor: FSR Tarpan

The Honker (initially known as Tarpan Honker, also Daewoo Honker, Andoria Honker, Intrall Honker 4x4, and DZT Tymińscy Honker) is a Polish multi-purpose off-road vehicle. Shown as a prototype in 1984, it was produced in a variety of models. It is best known for its use by the Polish Army both at home and in Iraq. Apart from the army and police forces, the company to own the largest number of Honkers is the Polish KGHM company, which uses them to transport miners underground.

== History ==
The prototype of the Honker was created in 1984 in the Fabryka Samochodów Rolniczych ("Farming Vehicle Works") or FSR in Poznań. Based on the earlier design of the Tarpan, it was to replace it as the basic Polish-made light commercial off-road vehicle in public services, a role previously held by both its predecessor and the imported Soviet UAZ-469. However, it was not until 1988 that serial production was started. The car was produced in two variants:

- Tarpan Honker 4012, a typical hardtop with room for up to 10 passengers
- Tarpan Honker 4022, a pick-up truck with room for 2 passengers

Soon after production started, the FSR started the construction of a new, slightly shorter, and narrower (2210 mm) version, which received the designation of Honker 4032. Although the prototype never entered serial production, it was the first car to be known solely as a Honker, without any indication of its relation to the earlier Tarpan.

In late 1996 the design was bought by the Daewoo Motor Polska company, who decided to continue the production in Lublin. The interior design was slightly modified and the car received the new designation of Daewoo Honker 2324. The car did not differ much from the original version and was available in the same set of options. There were plans for the creation of a modernized Daewoo Honker II with either 4x2 or 4x4 drive, but they were called off and instead the factory only modified the external design and continued the production under a new name of Daewoo Honker 2000.

After the bankruptcy of Daewoo, the license was inherited by two companies. Andoria-Mot continued the production in small quantities from 2002–2003, and in 2003 created two modernized versions, both in a hard-top pick-up combination. Intrall Polska made the Honker from Jan. 2004-Spring 2007. In 2004, Intrall created another model, the heavier off-road oriented Honker MAX. In addition, in 2004 the Honker saw yet another modification; a heavy armored and mine-protected version, the Honker Skorpion 3, was created specifically for the Polish Army forces in Iraq.

In 2016, the company producing the Honker, DZT Tymińscy, filed for bankruptcy, ending the production of the vehicle.

== Variants ==
Honker vehicles were produced in multiple versions, including hardtop versions, box trucks, and pickup trucks. Honkers produced up to 1992 used the M20 (taken from the FSO Warszawa) gasoline engines shared with Żuk and Nysa trucks. Initially, FSR installed gasoline automobile engines of Fiat origins from the FSO Polonez, next 2.5-litre Iveco diesel engines (most famously used in the Renault Master and Iveco Daily), and from 1997 onwards the Andoria turbodiesel engines 4CT90 and later 4CTi90. The truck has a three-door body, based on a rigid frame bridges driving the leaf springs.

== Production ==
Production volumes for the Honker were low, reaching a maximum level of a few hundred vehicles per year. In Poznan in 1992, FSR built 450 vehicles in 1992; 314 vehicles in 1994; and 288 vehicles in 1995. FSR production stopped in early 1996.

In mid 1996 Daewoo bought the rights and established Daewoo Motor Poland Sp. Ltd. to produce vehicles. Production resumed in autumn 1996 trials for the assembly of Honkers in Lublin. In both factories, they built only around 20 autos.

Yearly production were as follows:

- 1997 - 155 vehicles were produced
- 1998 – 232 vehicles were produced
- 1999 – about 350 vehicles were produced
- 2000 – about 200 vehicles were produced
- 2001 – about 30-50 vehicles were produced
- 2002 – about 140 vehicles were produced
- 2003 – about 278 vehicles were produced
- 2004 – 495 vehicles were produced
- 2005 – 177 vehicles were produced
- 2006 – 245 vehicles were produced
- 2007 – 35 vehicles were produced

In the spring of 2007, production was again suspended.

In 2008, the Ukrainian company DP Naftogazbud Polior planned to begin production of a modernized version of the Honker but for unknown reasons production never started there.

In 2009, Syndyk DMP, the owner of the rights to Honker, sold the company to DZT Tymińscy, which then restarted production of the Honker.

== Operators ==
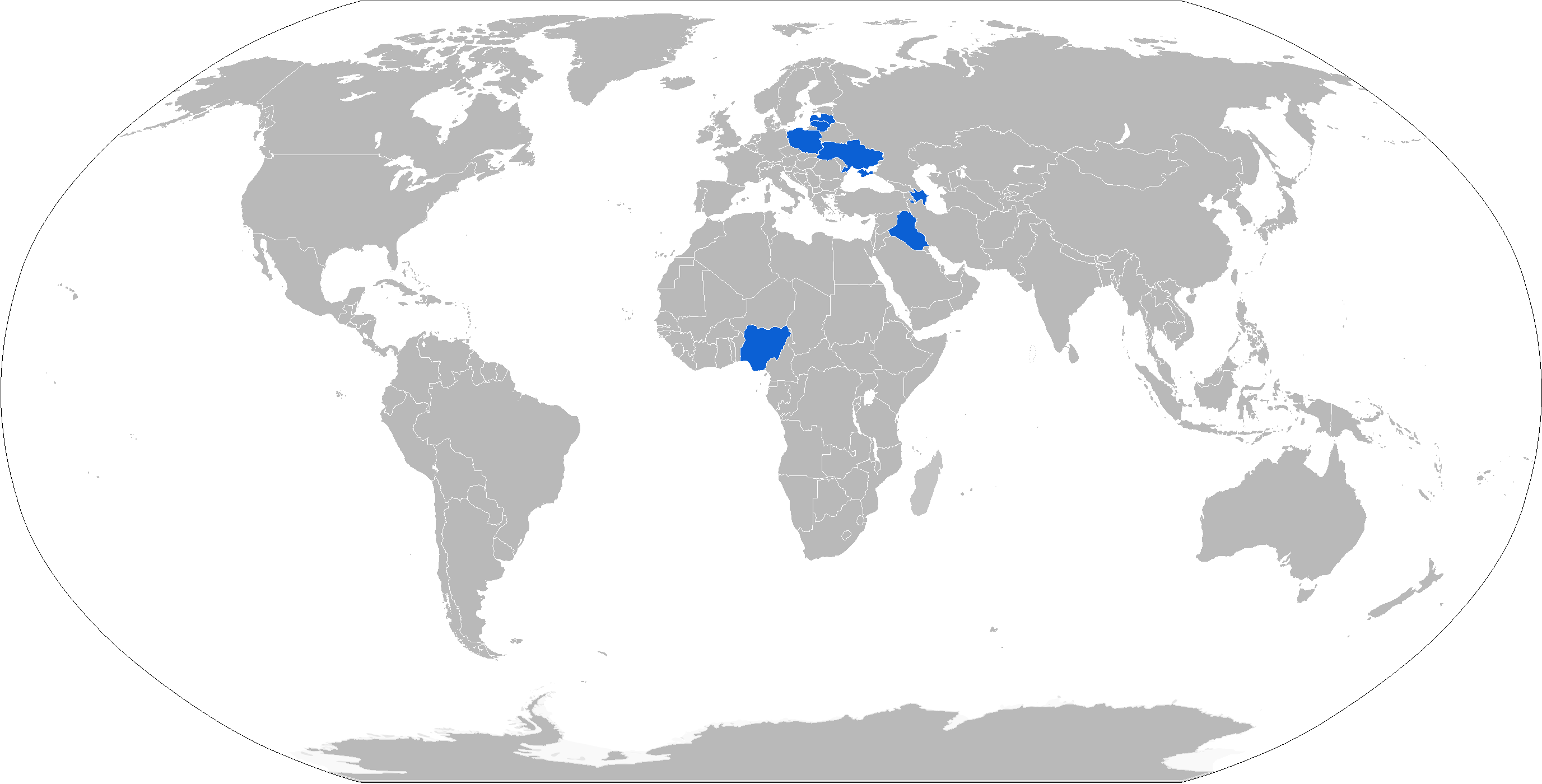
Map of Tarpan Honker operators in blue

- Azerbaijan – 3 Honkers in use by mine agencies.
- Iraq – dozen Honker Skorpion 3 (probably unarmed) in use by Iraqi army.
- Latvia – used by Latvian Forces in Iraq.
- Lithuania – used by Lithuanian Forces in Iraq.
- Nigeria – used by Nigerian Armed Forces.
- Poland – in use by Polish Land Forces, Policja, and others.
- Ukraine – several dozen Honkers were bought from Polish Land Forces by citizens of Ternopil (fund-raiser). Honkers were also renovated and sent to the War in Donbas.

== Gallery ==
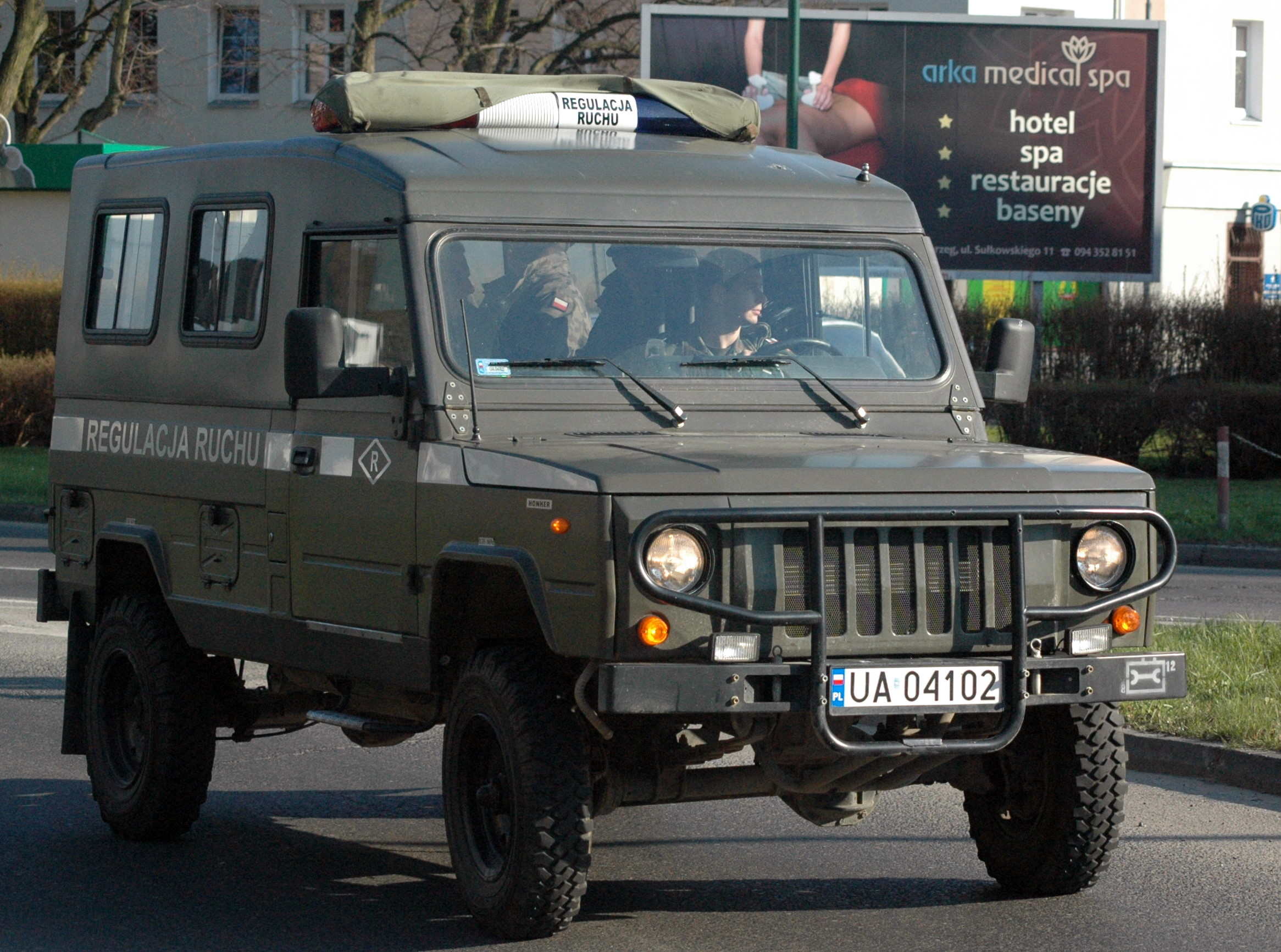
Honker in Kołobrzeg

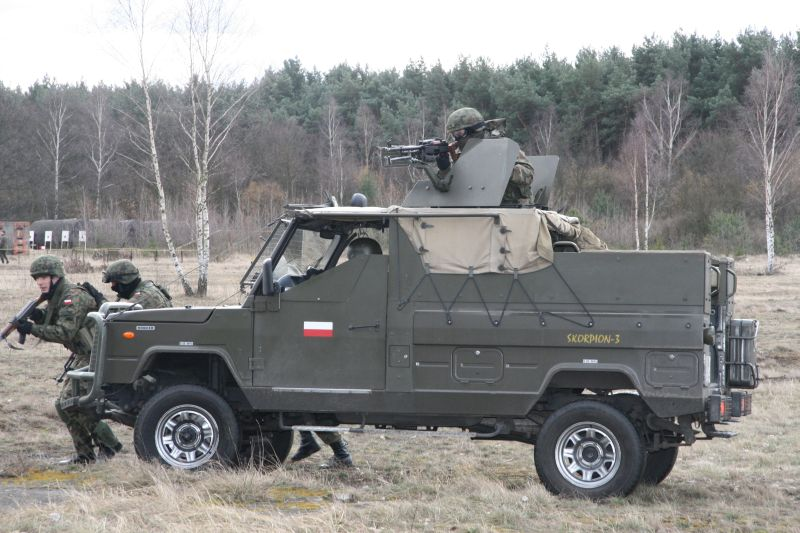
Honker Skorpion-3

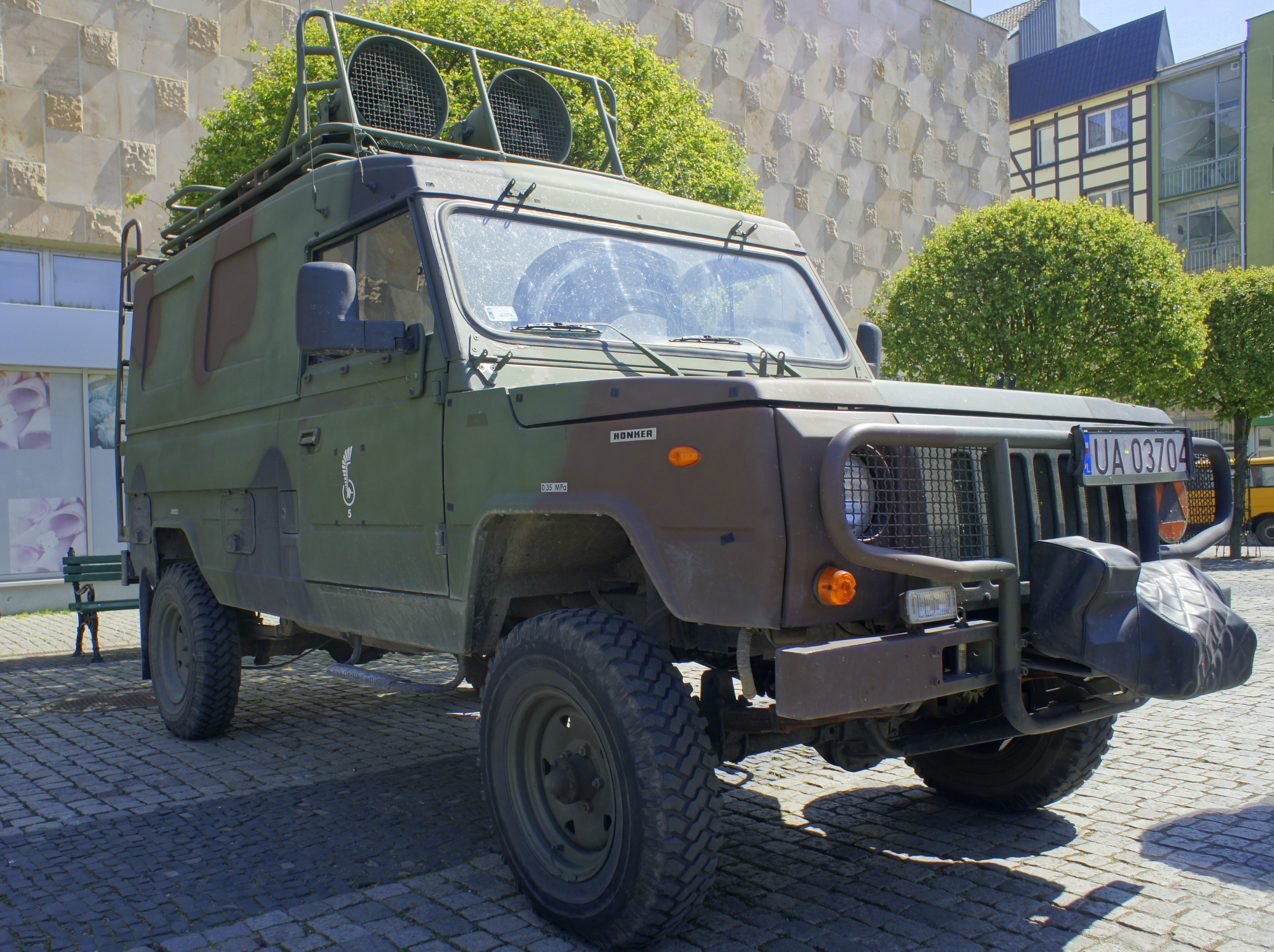
Honker Baryton

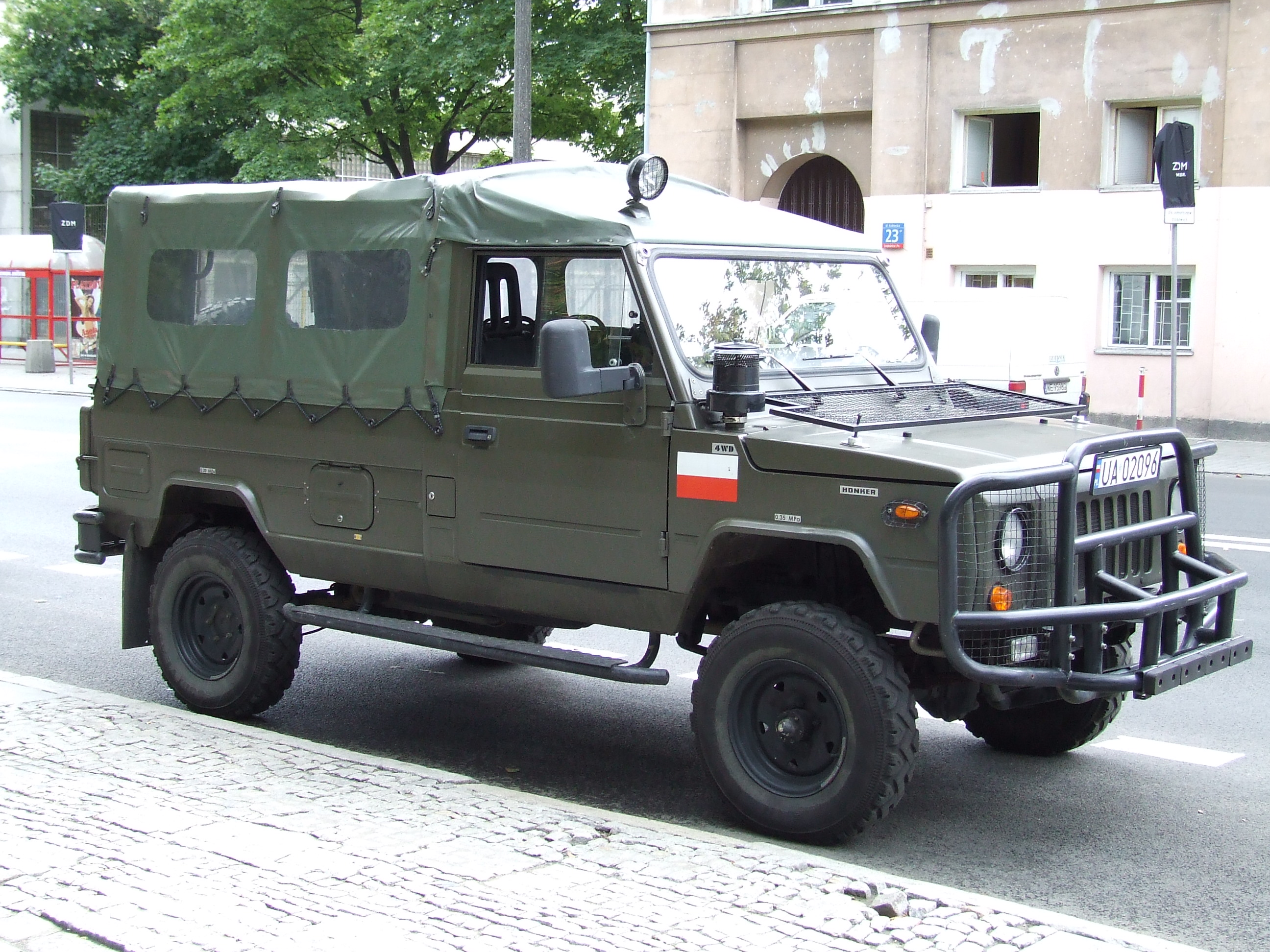
Tarpan Honker

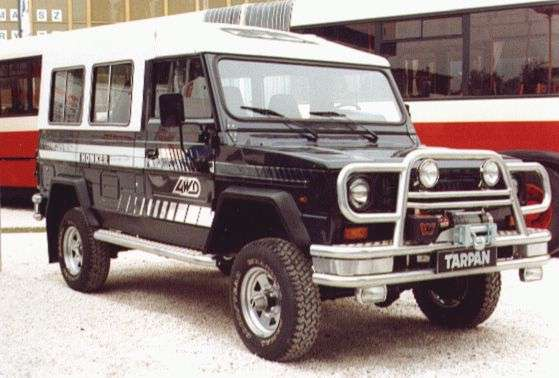
4x4 LWB Honker to offer for a civilian market

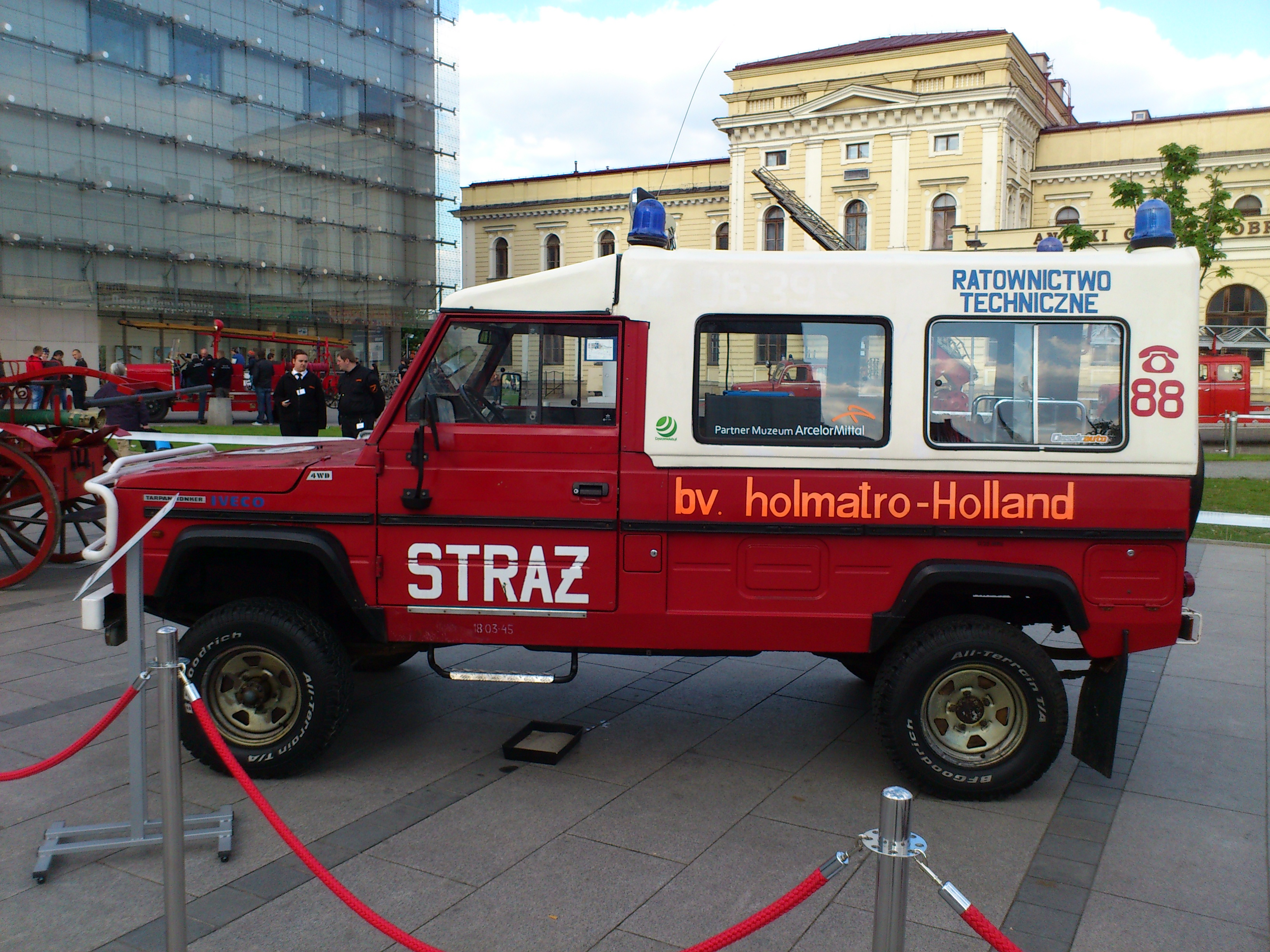
Honker in fire engine version. This fire engine served for many years in one of the SOPiRG ArcelorMittal Polska fire fighting units.

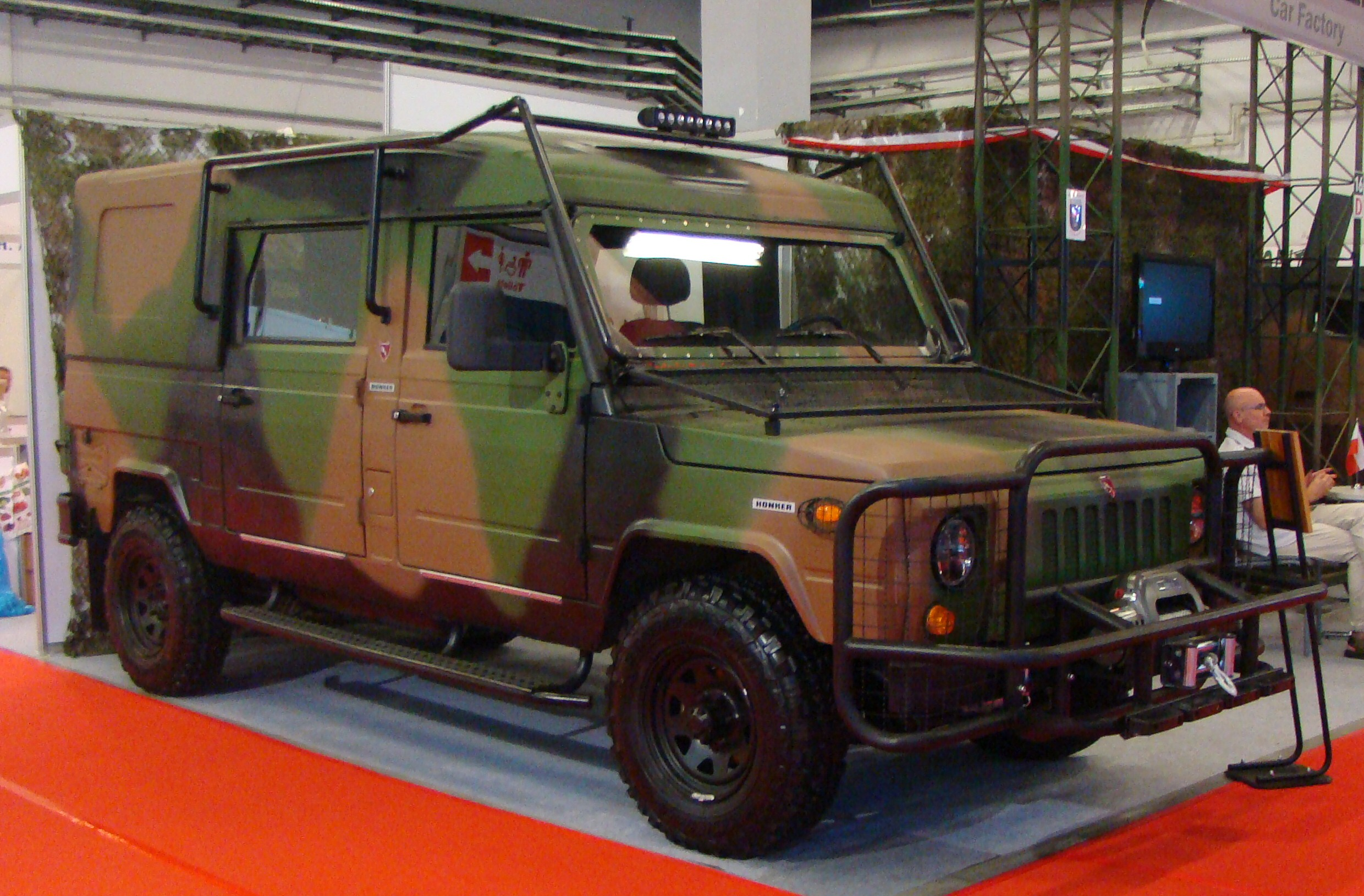
Honker in 5-door version with new Polish camouflage, demonstrated on Defence Industry Exposition (MSPO) in Kielce in 2015. Note the new HONKER brand logo on the car.

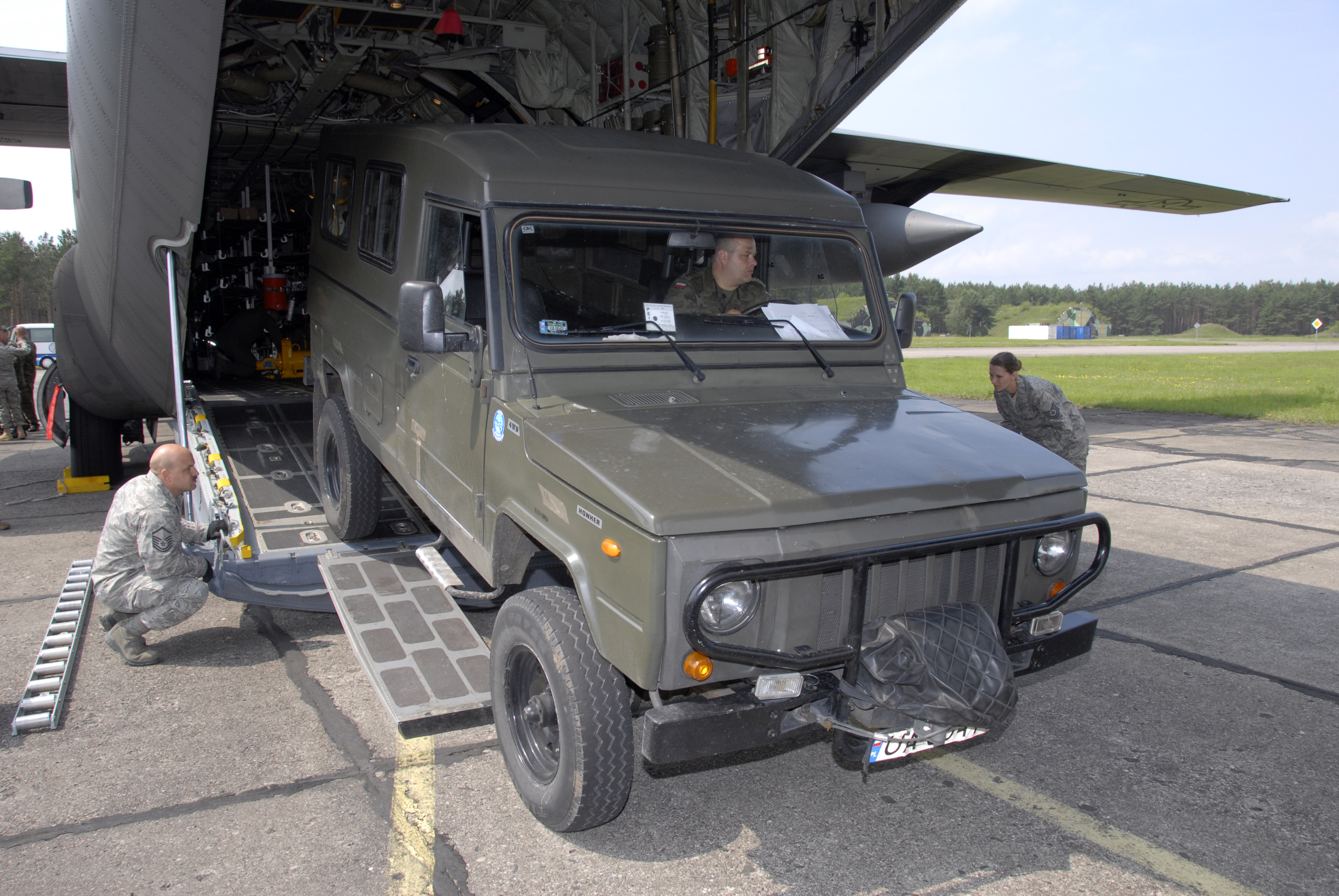
C-130 transporting a Honker
