= Fabryka Samochodów Rolniczych "Polmo" w Poznaniu =

Fabryka Samochodów Rolniczych "Polmo"
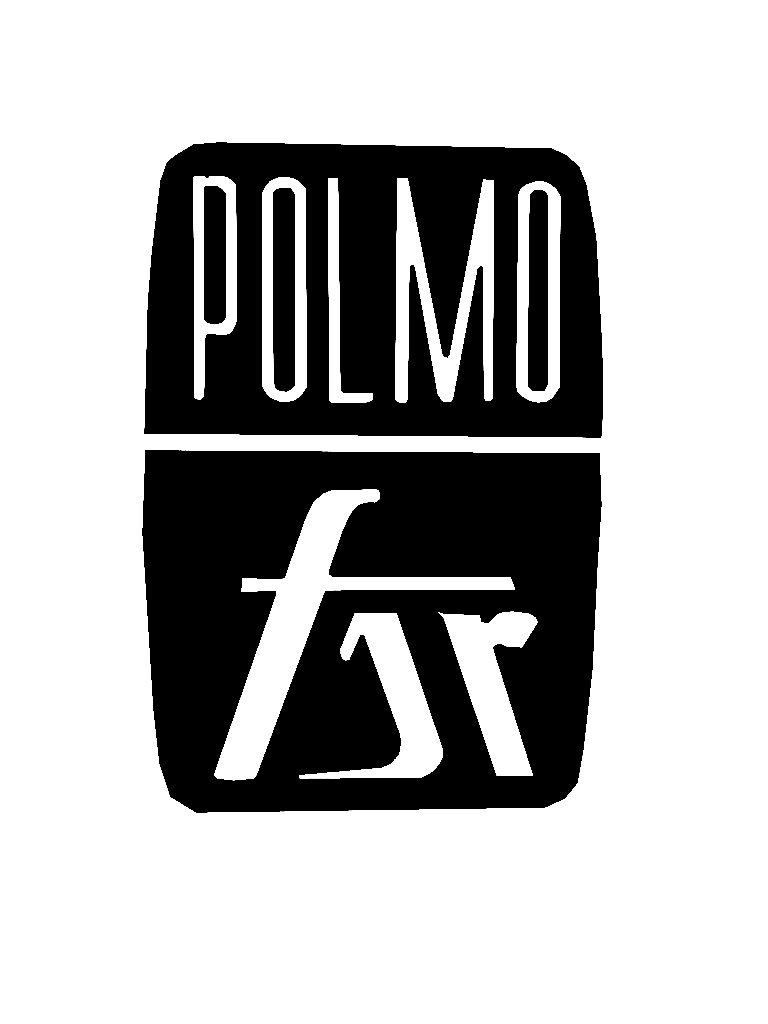
- Founded: May 1953 (WZNS); July 1, 1975 (FSR)
- Defunct: January 1996
- Headquarters: Poznań, Poland
- Number of employees: 3600 (1970)

Fabryka Samochodów Rolniczych "Polmo" w Poznaniu (transl. Agricultural Vehicle Factory "Polmo" in Poznań), more commonly known as FSR, was a Polish company located in Poznań that produced pickup trucks.

== History ==
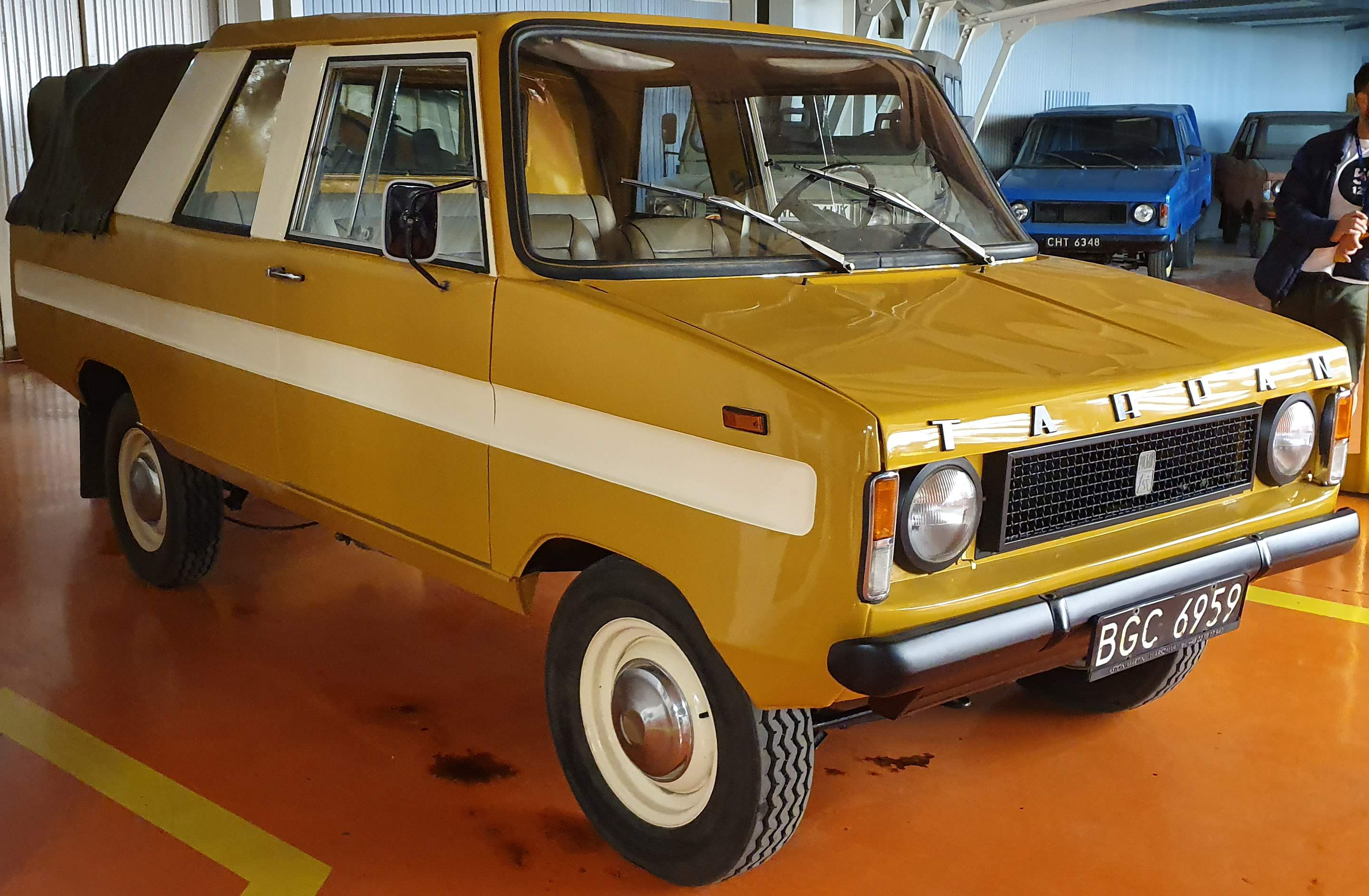
FSR Tarpan 233

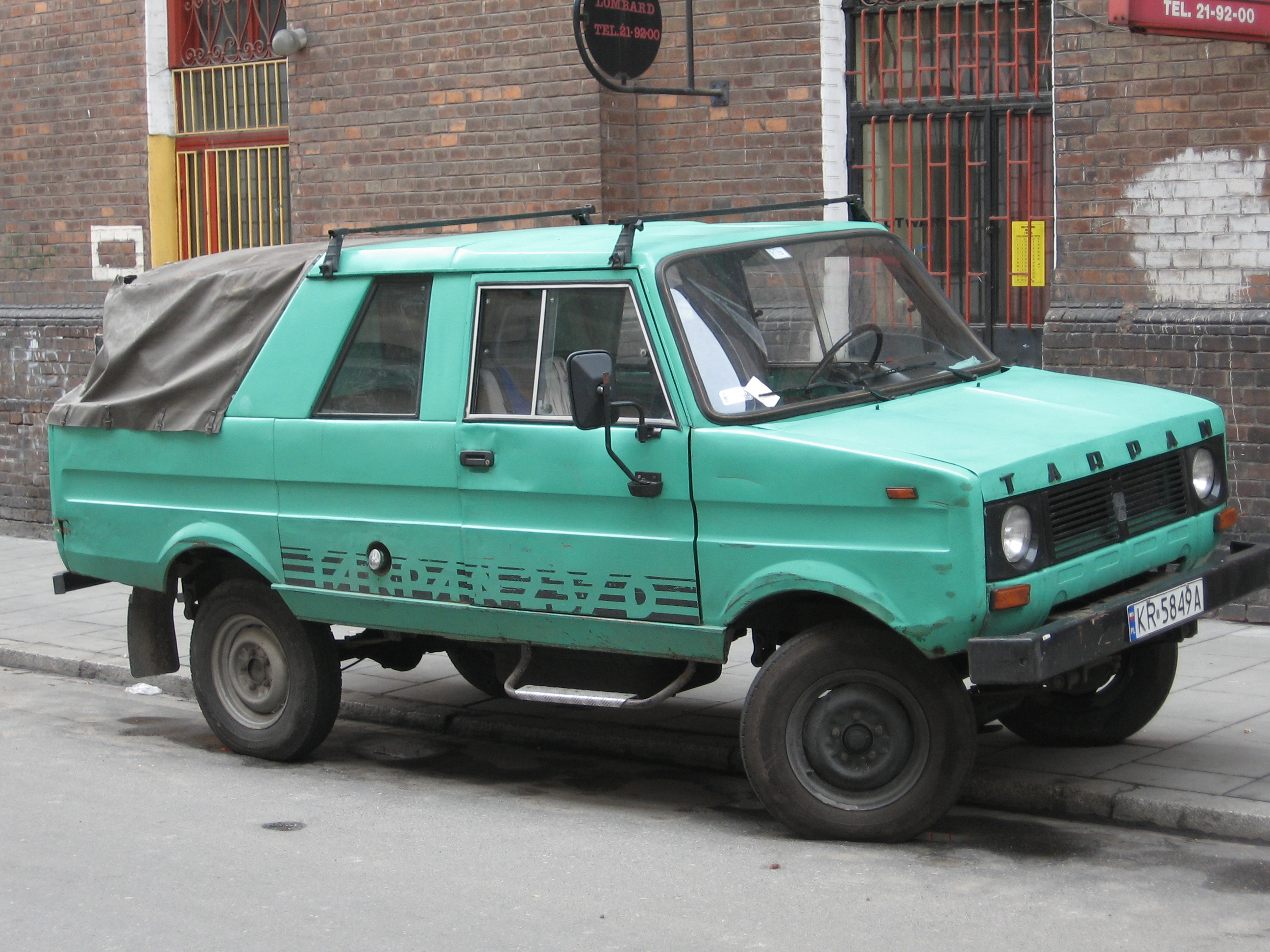
FSR Tarpan 237D

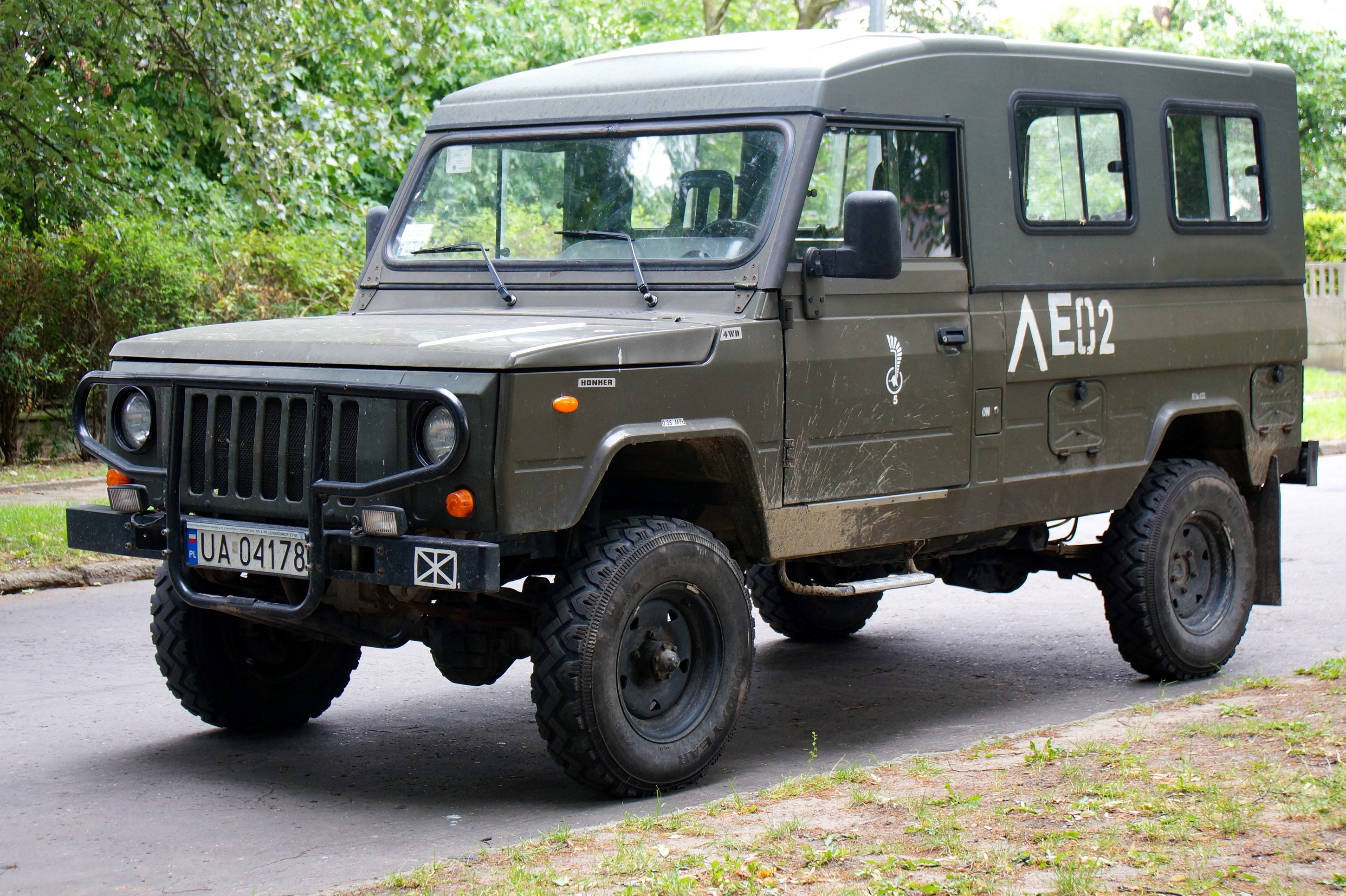
Tarpan Honker

At the beginning of the 1970s, work began on a delivery vehicle for farmers. In December 1972, the first series of 25 vehicles under the name FSR Tarpan left the gates of Wielkopolskie Zakłady Naprawy Samochodów, which was established in May 1953, and the origins of the plant date back to 1929. In April 1973, WZNS was incorporated into the Fabryka Samochodów Ciężarowych in Lublin as the Agricultural Car Plant. Repairs of heavy-duty vehicles were transferred to other specialized plants. Adaptation work necessary for the new production began, including enlarging the paint shop and preparing a body welding line.

Operational tests of prototypes, the first production cars and technological requirements caused the need to introduce a number of changes in the design of the FSR Tarpan. As a result of the first modernization, the exterior and interior of the car changed slightly.

In 1973, 250 cars were made, and a year later 1,582. Alternatively, M20 and S-21 engines (with a power of 51.5 kW) were used. In 1975, 2,760 cars were produced, and a year later 3,941. The car was modernized by the plant's design office.

On July 1, 1975, the Zakład Samochodów Rolniczych became independent and transformed into the Fabryka Samochodów Rolniczych "Polmo". A decision was also made to expand the factory and include several plants that had been FSR's main collaborators, including those in Gniezno, Swarzędz, and Złotów. FSR produced FSR Tarpan cars until 1991, and from 1988 to 1996 Tarpan Honker. From November 1993, the company operated under the name Tarpan Sp. z o.o.

In 1993, a joint venture called Volkswagen Poznań was established on the FSR grounds between Volkswagen AG and the Polish manufacturer Tarpan, which assembled Volkswagen Transporter vans from December 1993, and Škoda Favorit and Škoda Felicia cars from 1994. In 1996, the enterprise was liquidated and the company was transferred in 100% to the Volkswagen AG concern.

Production of the FSR Tarpan models gradually decreased, from around 600 units in the early 1990s (1990 – 589 units, 1991 – 610 units), to around 300 units in the mid-1990s (1994 – 314 units, 1995 – 288 units). After production ceased in early 1996, the rights to produce the Tarpan Honker models were taken over by Daewoo Motor Polska Sp. z o.o., which began their trial assembly in Lublin in the autumn of 1997.

== Vehicles ==
- FSR Tarpan (1973–1991)
- Tarpan Honker (1988–1996, then from 1996 in DMP)
