= FSR Tarpan =

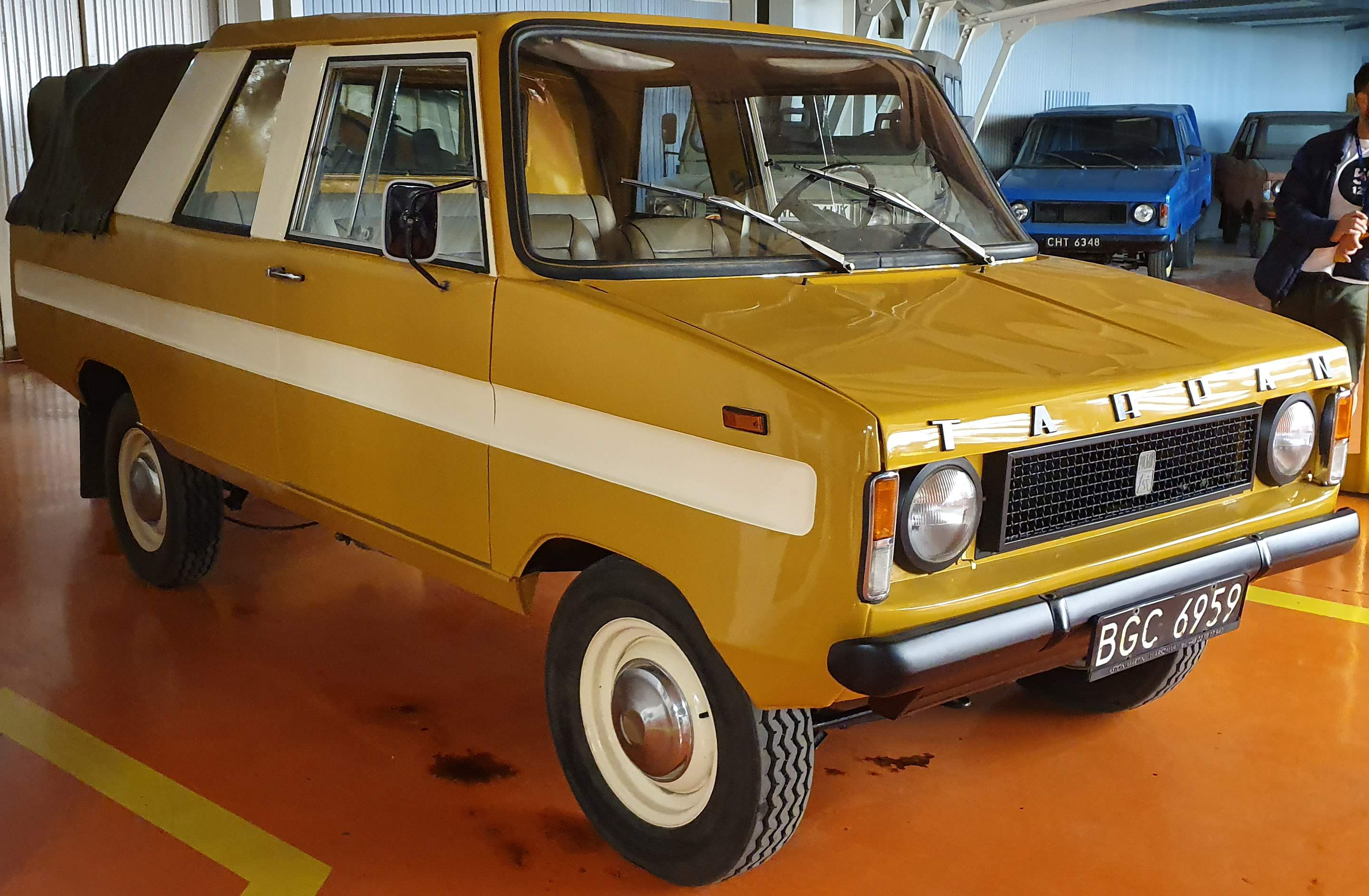
- FSR Tarpan 233

Overview
- Manufacturer: FSR
- Production: 1973–1995
- Assembly: Poland: Poznań

Body and chassis
- Class: Pickup truck
- Related: FSC Żuk; ZSD Nysa; FSO Warszawa

Chronology
- Successor: Tarpan Honker

The FSR Tarpan is a pickup truck produced by Fabryka Samochodów Rolniczych "Polmo" in Poznań, Poland between 1973 and 1995. It was exported to Greece and Iran.

== Overview ==
At the turn of the 1960s and 1970s the decision was made to build a car for agricultural purposes. It was decided that the cars would be manufactured in Greater Poland, the argument for which was the fact that Greater Poland was a leading region in agricultural production. Shortly after receiving approval from the party authorities, prototypes of the vehicles were built in two centers in Poznań. At Techniczna Obsługa Samochodów, a prototype was created under the name Warta, and in the Instytut Obróbki Plastycznej, which cooperated with the Poznań University of Technology, the Tarpan prototype. Both cars were delivered to Warsaw, where the 6th Congress of the Party was to be held in December 1971 at the Palace of Culture and Science in Warsaw. Beforehand, however, both cars were inspected by Edward Gierek and representatives of several automotive-related companies and offices. The vehicles were viewed by, among others, Minister of Machine Industry Tadeusz Wrzaszczyk, Stanisław Płatek (technical director of ZPMot), and Zdzisław Podbielski (technical advisor at the Central Design and Research Center). After inspecting the Warta and Tarpan prototypes and testing the vehicles, another meeting was held several months later. It was decided to assemble a team consisting of designers from both Poznań and Warsaw. Roman Skwarek was appointed team leader. The team abandoned the original Warta and Tarpan concepts and started over. Front-wheel drive and the S31 engine from the FSO Syrena were abandoned. Instead, the M20 engine from the FSC Żuk and FSO Warszawa was used. Two vehicles, designated the Warta-2, were built. The first had canvas doors and a canvas cover on the cargo bed, and the second had a wall separating the driver's cab from the cargo bed. This wall could be moved and carried two people and 600 kg of cargo, or six people and 300 kg of cargo. Both vehicles were presented in September 1972 at the Bydgoszcz Agricultural Achievements Exhibition in Myślęcinek near Bydgoszcz, organized on the occasion of the national harvest festival. A model with a sliding wall was taken into production.

The start of series production was planned for early 1973, with an initial production run of one thousand units. The vehicle was manufactured at Wielkopolskie Zakłady Naprawach Samochodowych in Poznań-Antoninek (later renamed Fabryka Samochodów Rolniczych "Polmo"; today it houses the Volkswagen factory). In December 1972, the so-called first "information series" left the factory gates 25 cars manufactured here, now under the name Tarpan. The name change was justified by the fact that Tarpan was a symbol of the durable Polish horse. This name was chosen in a competition announced by Express Poznański in September 1972. 1,146 people submitted 416 suggestions. Bronisław Hasiński came up with the name Tarpan. Other suggestions at the time included: Autorol, Bomber, Plonołaz, Poznaniak, Samrol, Kary, Dzik, and Mrówka. By the end of April of the following year, 250 Tarpan 233 vehicles had been produced. At that time, the plant was incorporated into the Fabryka Samochodów Ciężarowych in Lublin as Zakład Samochodów Rolniczych. Heavy-duty truck repairs were transferred to other specialized plants in Boguchwała and Środa Wielkopolska. Adaptation work necessary for the new production has begun. The paint shop has been expanded and a body welding line has been prepared.

The Field tests of the first cars and technological requirements necessitated a number of changes to the vehicle's design. The initial modernization slightly altered the car's appearance. A front bumper, new front indicator lamps (from the Polski Fiat 125p were introduced, along with a new, narrower grille that no longer covered the headlights. The headlights now feature two-stage beam height adjustment, depending on the vehicle's load.

The bodywork had its outer welded edges removed. The push-button door handles used previously were replaced with door handles from the Polski Fiat 126p. The interior featured improved front seat shapes, a revised instrument cluster, and a modified steering column length and angle. The rear suspension now features a telescopic shock absorber. The vehicle's curb weight increased to 1,320 kg. In 1973, 250 Tarpans were produced, and the following year, this figure rose to 1,582. Alternatively, engines of the M20 and S-21] type were used (with a power of 51.5 kW). The following years were also characterized by a large increase in production; in 1975, 2,760 Tarpans were produced, and a year later, 3,941 units.

On July 1, 1975, the Tarpan manufacturer gained independence and began operating under the name Fabryka Samochodów Rolniczych "Polmo" in Poznań. A decision was also made to expand the factory and incorporate several plants that had previously been mainly collaborators with FSR, including those in Gniezno, Swarzędz and Złotów.

The factory's design office developed another modernization of the Tarpan and new body versions. The individual front passenger seats were replaced with a two-person reclining bench. The cars received a new instrument panel design. Many electrical equipment units unified with the Polish Fiat family were introduced. Some cars were equipped with new, 4-speed gearboxes (made at Fabryka Samochodów Osobowych). At the request of customers, some Tarpans were equipped with a mechanical differential lock, making driving easier in difficult terrain. From 1976, the Tarpan body sheets were made on presses (previously they were hammered. The body was manufactured entirely in the Poznań plant, and the frame in their branch, while the suspension and drive components were unified with other vehicles and supplied by other plants. Due to unsophisticated and labor-intensive production methods, which relied heavily on manual work, production was low. In the press at the time, this was presented as an advantage, allowing to avoid high costs of modern tooling, given the assumed production volume and variety of body versions, as well as to avoid factory downtime due to a faster production pace. The bottleneck in the production process, which determined the production volume, was the low efficiency of the paint shop, where the bodies were painted using spray guns.

In 1978, a pre-prototype version of the Tarpan (FSR Tarpan 234) with two-axle drive was created, but it did not enter production. The following year, special Tarpans were made for journalists to celebrate the Pope John Paul II's visit to his homeland. In the early 1980s, a national austerity program was implemented, banning the production of the most material- and energy-intensive products. This list included Tarpan cars and the S21 engine, and the end of Tarpan production was set for January 1987. Given the current situation, the factory management decided to install the Perkins engine, which was also used in the Ursus C-360-3P. The model was called Tarpan 239D, and the prototype was unveiled in June 1982 at the Poznań International Fair. The first vehicles began to be assembled in August 1986. The poorly selected gearbox and the high noise generated by the vehicle contributed to end of Tarpan production.

== Models ==
=== 233 model ===
The Tarpan 233 had a standard cab with 575 kg carrying capacity or an extended cab with 350 kg capacity.

=== 235 model ===
The Tarpan 235 had a reinforced chassis and a carrying capacity of 1000 kg. It had also turn signals from Polski Fiat 126p. The production began in 1980.

=== F-233/F-235 model ===
The Tarpan F-233/F-235 had the steering wheel and a 1481 cm³ engine from Polski Fiat 125p.

=== 239D model ===
The Tarpan 239D had a diesel engine.

== Gallery ==
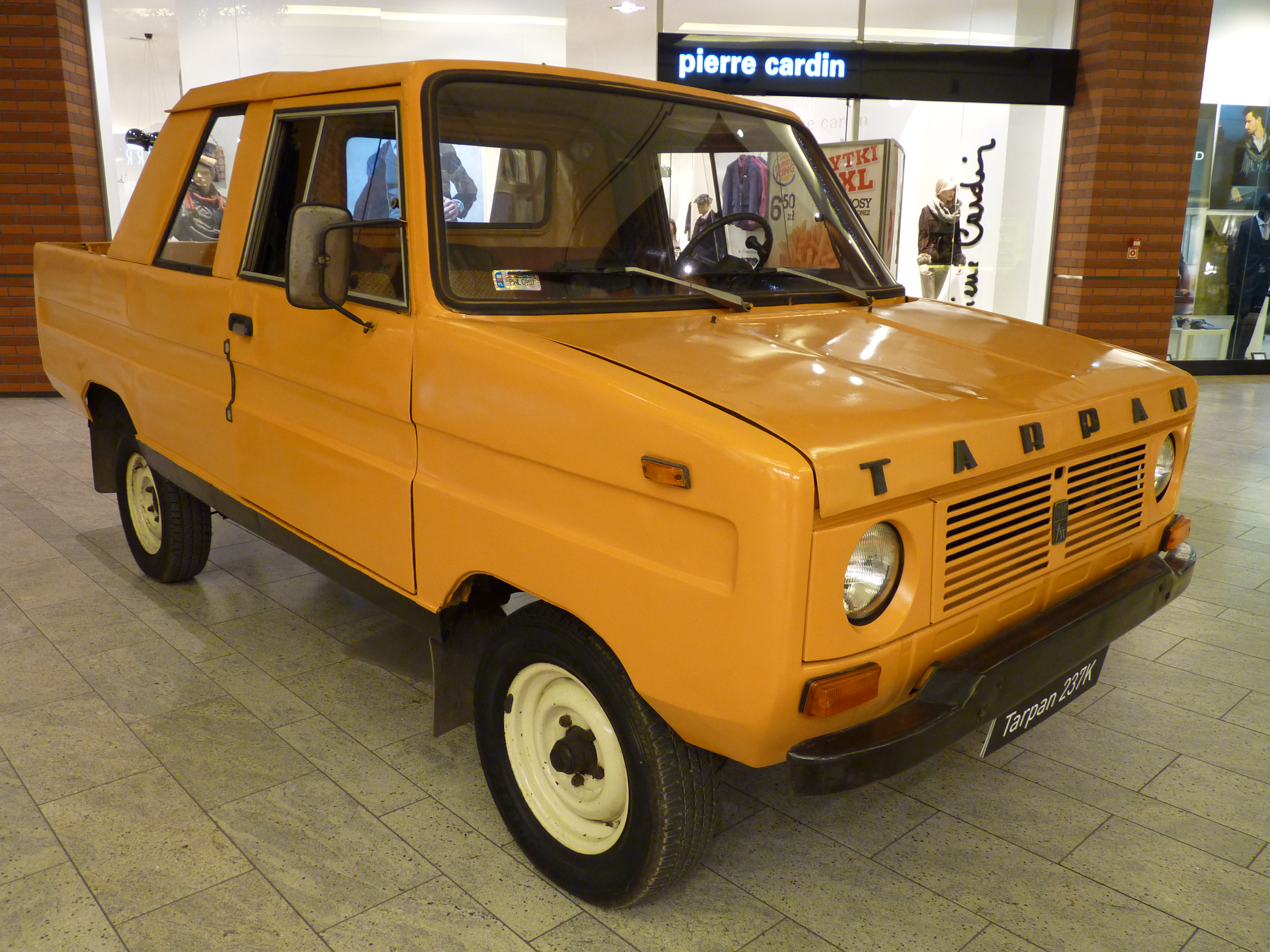
FSR Tarpan 237S

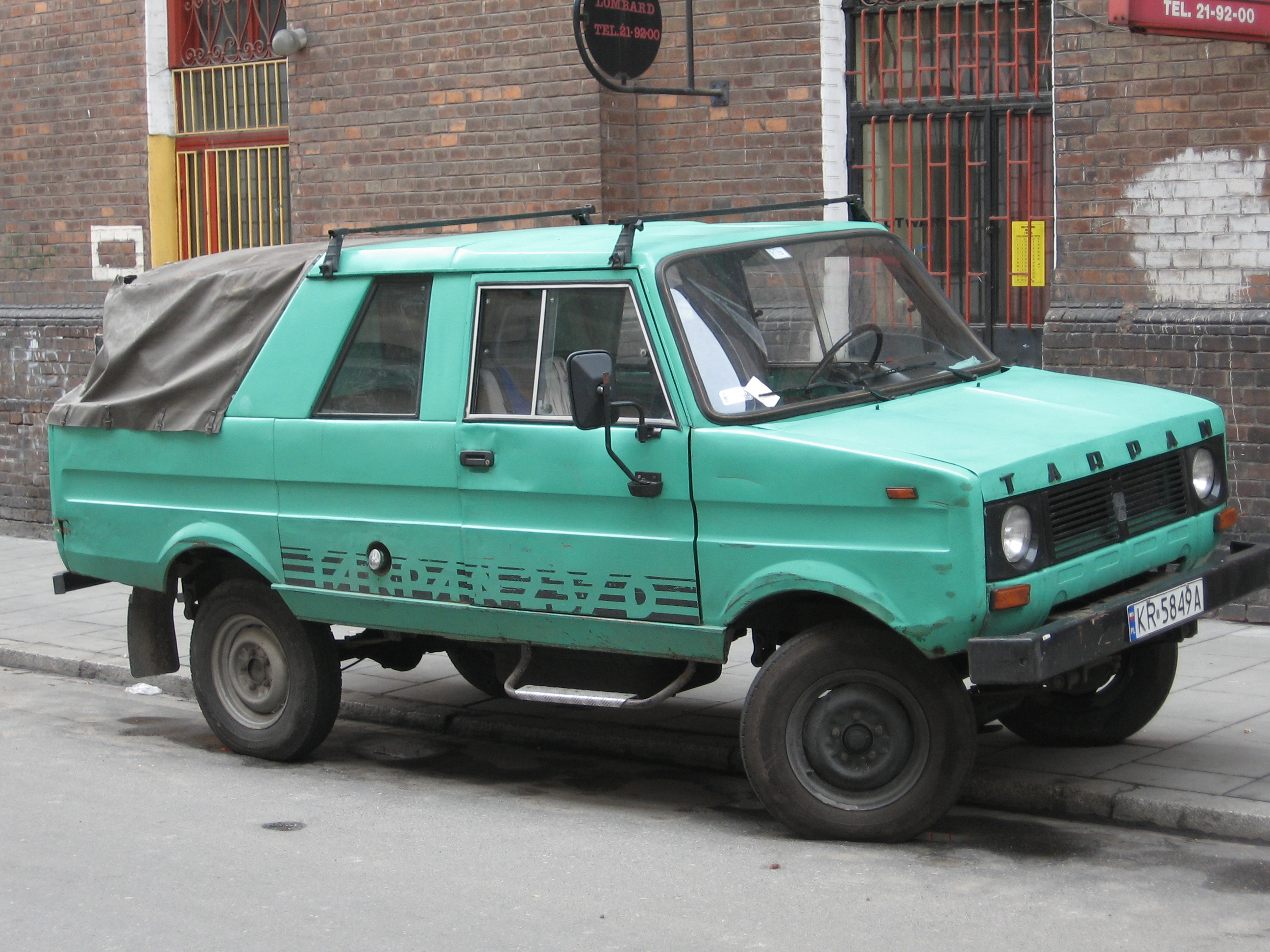
FSR Tarpan 237D

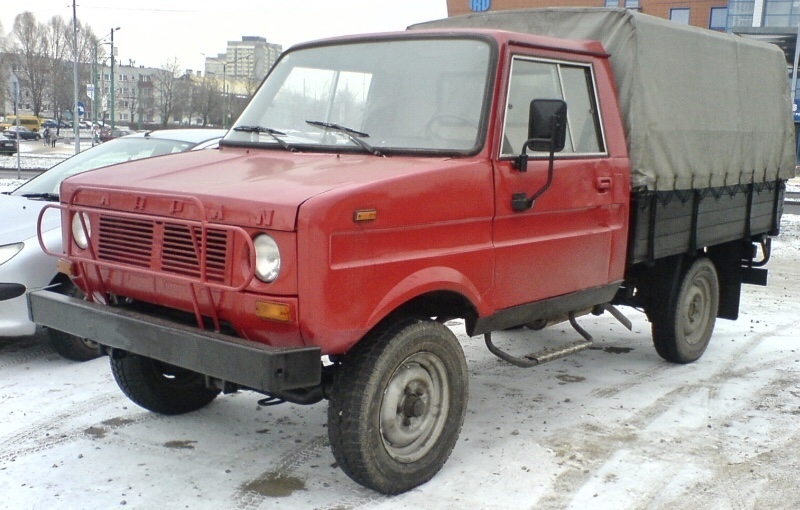
FSR Tarpan 239D
