= FSC Żuk =

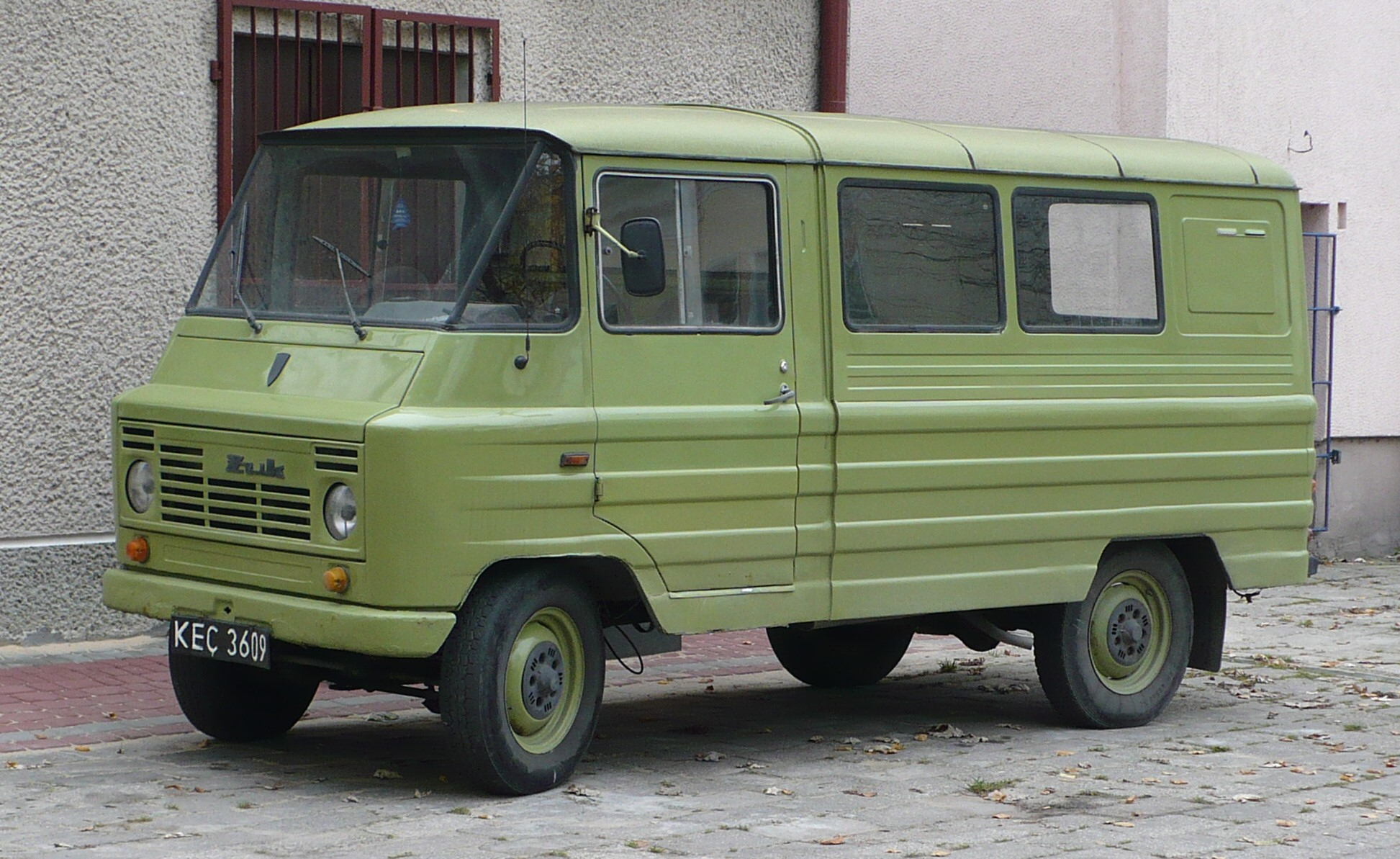
- FSC Żuk A-07

Overview
- Manufacturer: FSC
- Also called: ELTRAMCO Ramzes (Egypt)
- Production: July 1959 – February 1998
- Assembly: Poland: Lublin; Poland: Węgrów; Egypt: Cairo (ELTRAMCO)

Body and chassis
- Class: Light commercial vehicle
- Body style: Van; Minibus; Pickup truck
- Layout: Longitudinally, front mounted engine, rear-wheel drive
- Related: ZSD Nysa; FSR Tarpan; FSO Warszawa

Powertrain
- Engine: Petrol: 2,120 cc (2.1 L) M-20 flathead I4; 2,120 cc (2.1 L) S-21 OHV I4; Diesel: 2,417 cc (2.4 L) 4C90 SOHC I4
- Power output: M-20: 50.7 PS (37 kW; 50 hp); S-21: 71 PS (52 kW; 70 hp); 4C90: 71 PS (52 kW; 70 hp)

Chronology
- Predecessor: FSC Lublin-51
- Successor: FSC Lublin

The FSC Żuk (pl. Beetle) is a van produced by Fabryka Samochodów Ciężarowych in Lublin, Poland between 1959 and 1998. It was based on FSO Warszawa, which in turn was licensed from the Soviet passenger car GAZ-M20 Pobeda, and so was similar to a Soviet developed van, the RAF-977. The chassis, suspension and engine from FSO Warszawa formed the basis of the Żuk and the Nysa light vans designed in the late 1950s. About 587818 were manufactured.

== Overview ==
The Żuk was mainly sold to state organizations, but also to individuals. After 1989, with the liberalization of the Polish economy, the Żuk was able to maintain sales to the traditional markets and expand the number sold to individual consumers. The final few years of production was in parallel to its successor, the Lublin van, as a cheaper alternative.

The Żuk came in a range of body styles. The most common were van and light 1.1-ton pickup truck. Rarer variants were minibus and a long-cab truck. Rare for a van, it had independent front suspension. It was very angular, with a number of wide channels running along the side of the body and a completely flat windscreen/windshield. After about ten years in production the front of the cab was restyled, from then on the distinctive side channels no longer continued around onto the front to meet the grille. No further changes were made, except a minor change to the number of vents located above the headlights.

The Żuk is a favourite of farmers, and a common place to find groups of them was at any local market when they were used to transport crops from the fields to the farmers’ own stalls. The Polish postal service (Poczta Polska) used large numbers of Żuks painted in a dull orange colour, and local fire services used them as personnel carriers or even as mini fire engines in country districts.

The Żuk was shipped to the Soviet Union in the panel van form. From the 1970s to about 1990, it was also manufactured in Egypt under licence as the ELTRAMCO Ramzes.

== Engines ==
For the early production versions the M-20 engine was used. This engine was derived from the 1937 Dodge D-5 3.6 L (217.8 cubic inches) inline-six engine shortened by two cylinders and dimensions adapted to the metric system. The resulting M-20 engine was used in several post-war Russian and Polish designs: it was installed in the GAZ-69, Pobeda, Warszawa, Nysa, Tarpan, and Żuk cars. It was produced by FSO until the 1970s. In the meantime, it was modernized, increasing the compression ratio from 6.2 to 6.8, resulting in a slight increase in power and a reduction in fuel consumption. The engine was very flexible, simple, and had low fuel quality requirements. These advantages came at the cost of high fuel consumption and a significant weight.

Later, the block and head were slightly modified (changing the shape of the compression chamber, increasing the compression ratio, introducing an OHV valve system, resulting in the S-21 engine, with a maximum power of 51.5 kW (70 HP), later installed in Warszawa, Nysa, Tarpan and Żuk cars. The S-21 engine was produced from 1962 until 1993.

The development of the third engine for the Zuk models, the 4C90 was motivated in the early 1970s due to the high fuel consumption of the S-21 gasoline engine, commonly installed in Polish delivery vans produced at the time and by the significant increase in fuel prices globally and in Poland. The engine was designed at W.S.W. "Andoria" by a design team led by engineer Andrzej Fryś. Technical documentation for the engine was ready in 1974. Two prototypes for dynamometer and road tests were launched in September 1975. By 1981, only approximately 50 pre-production engines had been built and tested in cars. The base 4C90 engine was primarily intended for the Żuk and Nysa models (where it systematically replaced the S-21 engine), and earlier versions of the Lublin trucks. Between 1975 and 1989, approximately 1,400 4C90 engines were produced, with 500 units produced in 1989 alone. In November 1989, the engine was modernized, including changes to the design of the oil pump and its drive.

== Variants ==
There were two main types of Żuk trucks, the ones with the original slightly "rounded" front and the more angular improved version. The change was made at the end of 1960s. Other modifications were indicated with suffixes M, B and C (for example A-11M, A-15B or A-151C).

A-03: older version pickup with optional tarpaulin cover.

A-05: older version van, rear compartment has only rear window, no side windows.

A-06: newer version van, similar to A05 except the nose.

A-07: van for cargo or passengers ("tow-os"), similar to A06, the rear compartment has side windows.

A-09: older version flatbed truck with optional tarpaulin covered box.

A-11: newer version of the A09 flatbed truck.

A-13: newer version pickup, similar to A03.

A-15: firefighter truck, first based on the A05 then later on the A06 van, with reinforced roof structure, added ladder and firefighting equipment storage on the roof, with a portable fire pump and additional equipment (hoses, pickaxe, etc.) in the rear compartment. Also added rotating emergency lights above the cab and a siren (electronic or electromechanical).

A-151: firefighter truck similar to A15, with a front-mounted fire pump. The pump was powered by the crankshaft of the truck's engine via an electromagnetically actuated clutch.

A-16: crew cab version of the A11, with shorter bed.

== Gallery ==
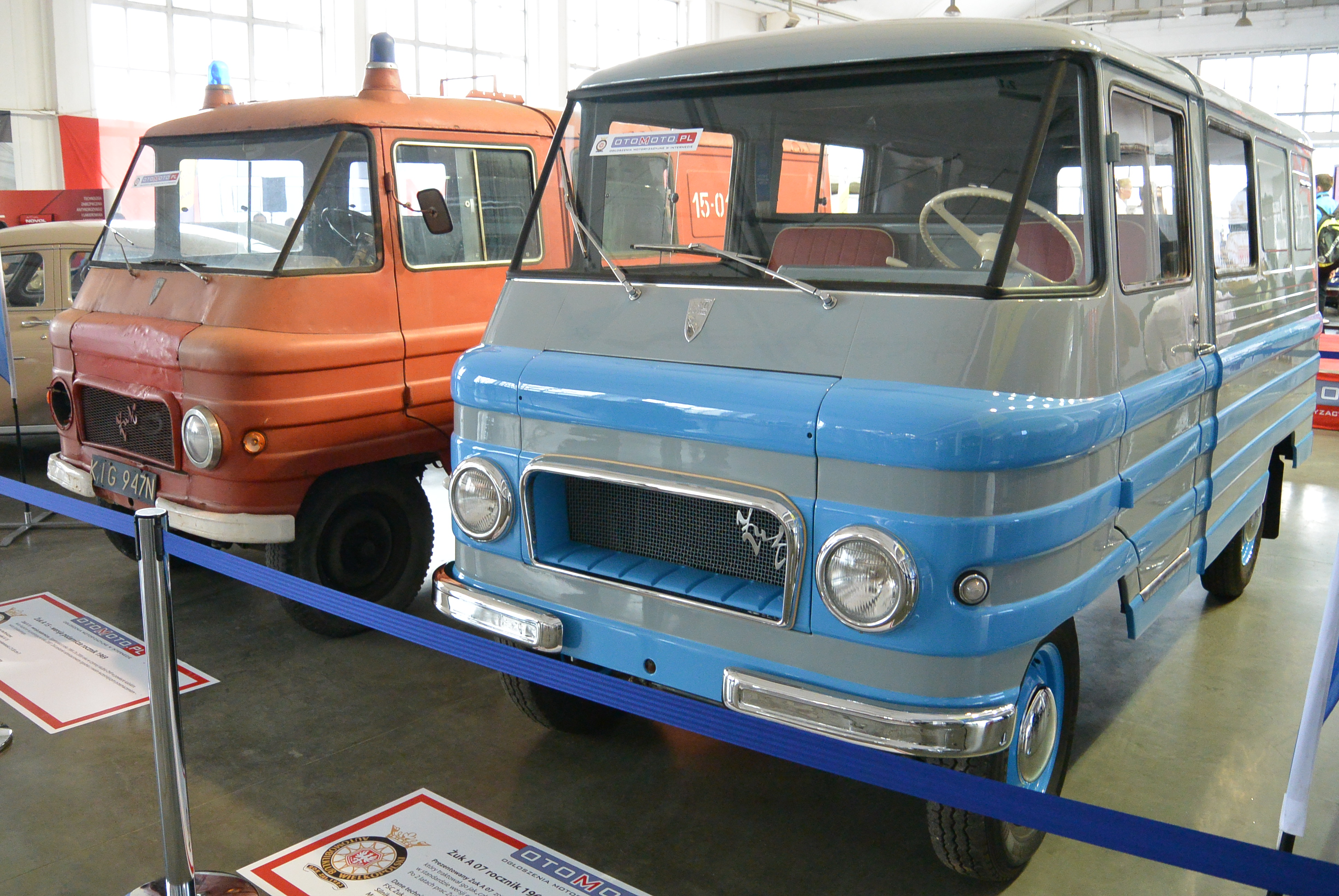
FSC Żuk A-07 from 1968

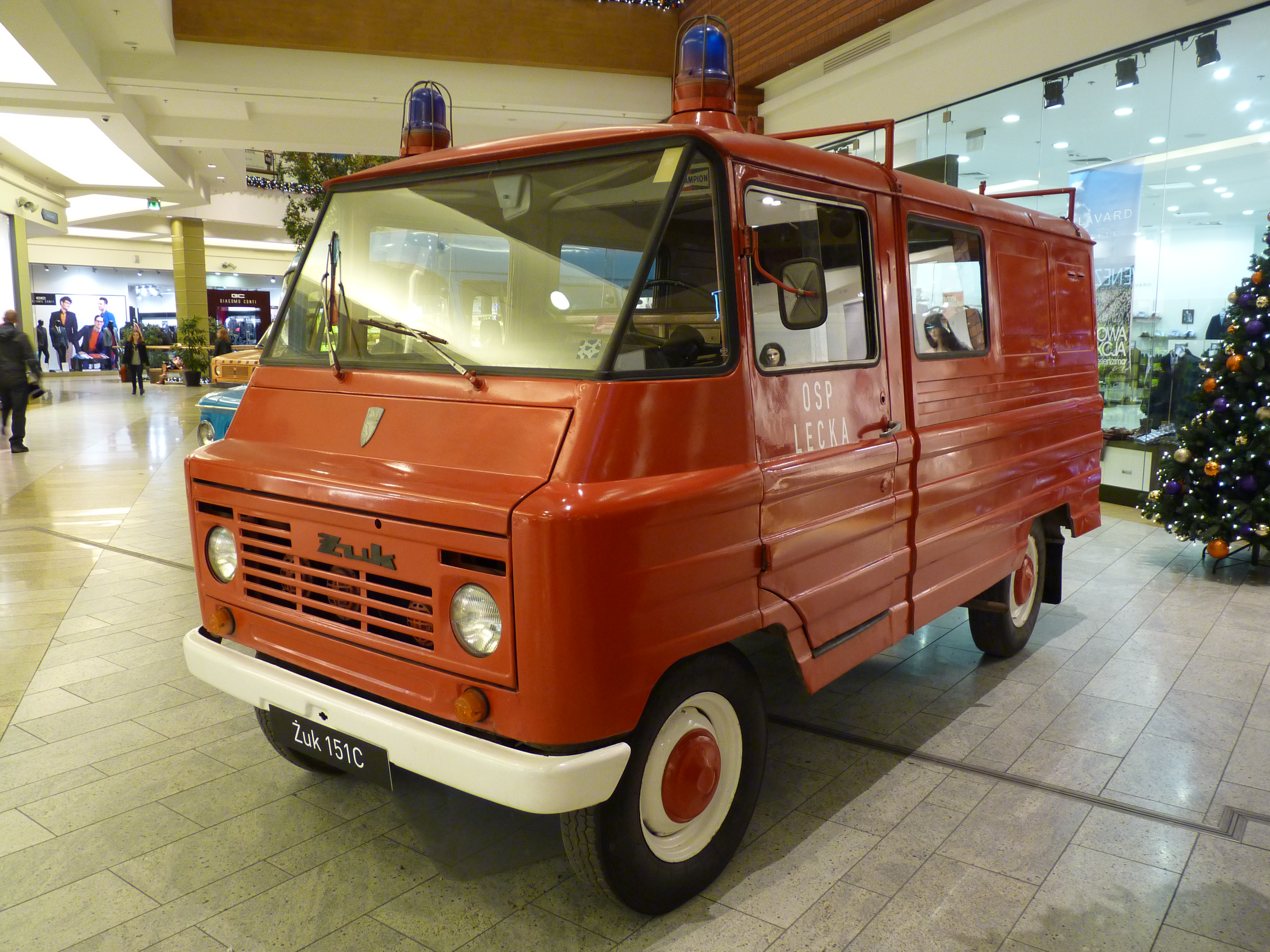
FSC Żuk A-151

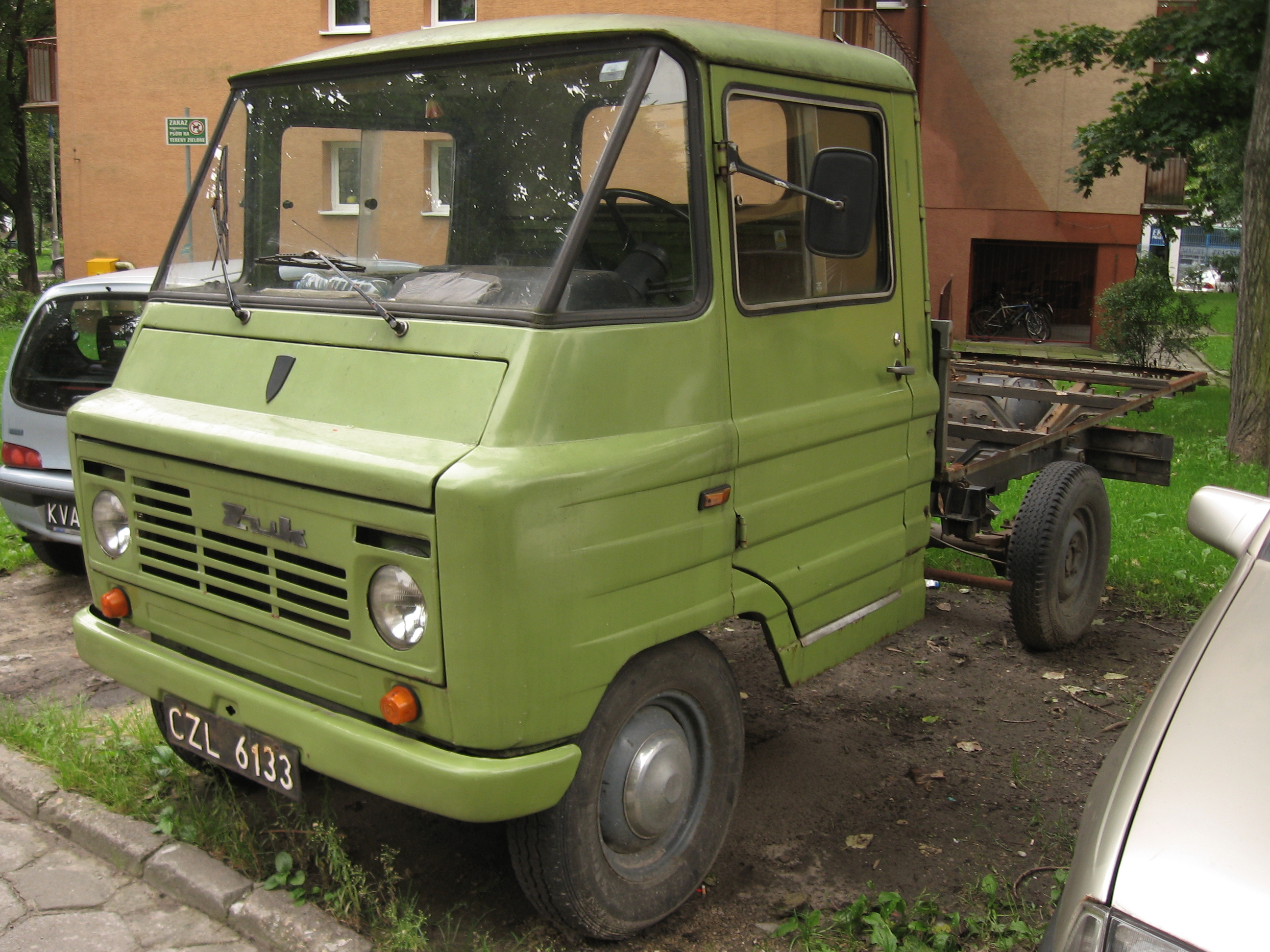
FSC Żuk A-11

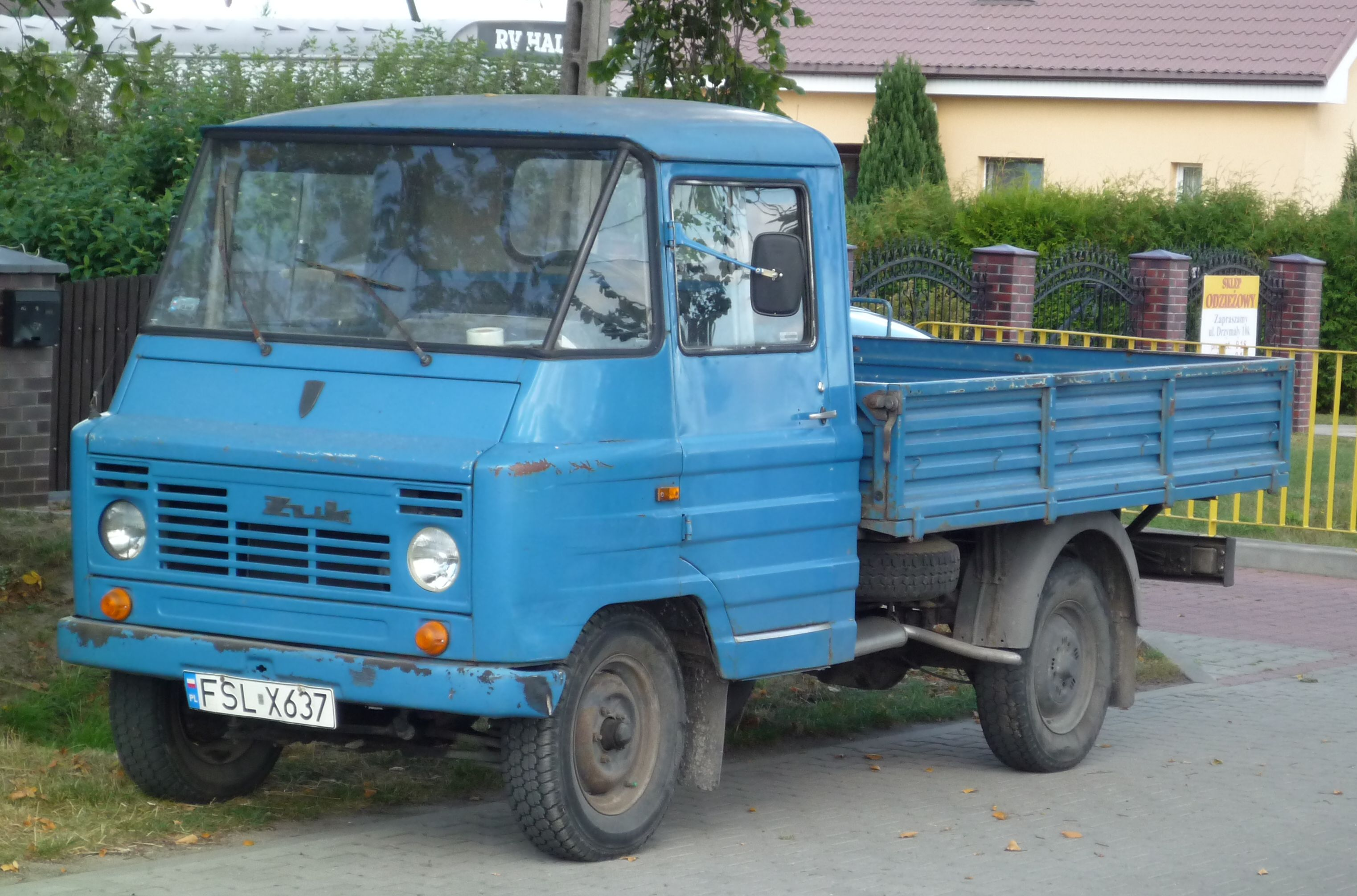
FSC Żuk A-11B
