= ZSD Nysa =

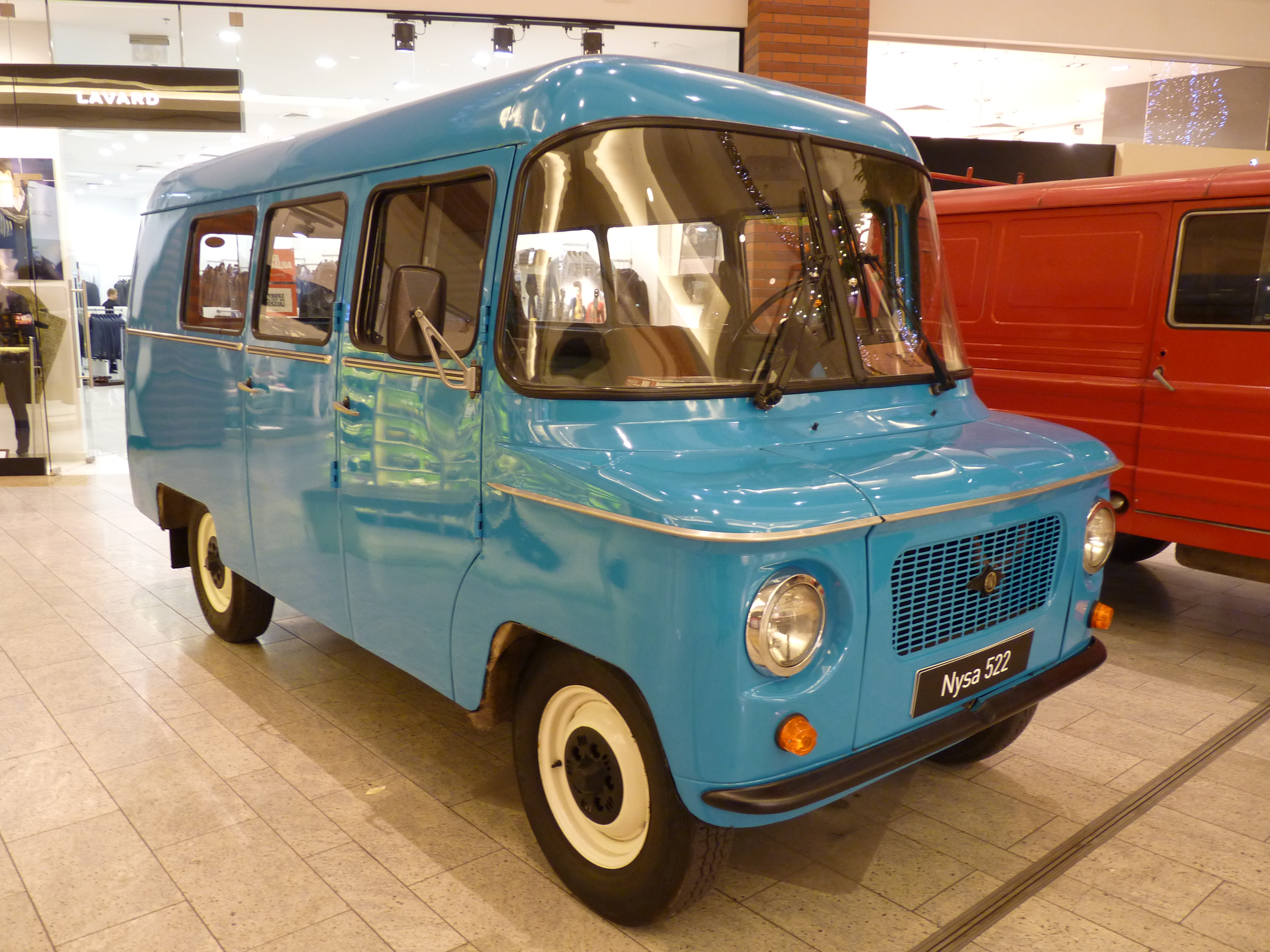
- ZSD Nysa 522 T

Overview
- Manufacturer: ZSD
- Production: 1959–1994
- Assembly: Poland: Nysa

Body and chassis
- Class: Light commercial vehicle
- Body style: Van; Minibus; Pickup truck
- Related: FSC Żuk; FSO Warszawa; FSR Tarpan

Chronology
- Successor: FSC Lublin

The ZSD Nysa is a van produced by Zakład Samochodów Dostawczych in Nysa, Poland between 1959 and 1994. The Nysa was based on the same chassis as the angular shaped Żuk van, but had rounded body lines, especially the two-part rounded windshield, and was considered more comfortable and a better fit for carrying people. The basic body variant was a universal van, for cargo or persons, with sliding doors on the right or conventional doors (marked with a letter T - towos). At the rear, most variants had a single door opening to the left side.

== Overview ==
A few variants existed: a cargo van (letter F - furgon), a minibus (letter M) and an ambulance (letter S), and some others. A rare variant was made in the form of a light truck. At the time, the Nysa was practically the only van-size ambulance used in Poland. Many vans were sold to the Militia, which was the only form of police during the Communist era in Poland; blue Nysa vans became a kind of "trademark" of the Militia (Militia variants had slide doors on both sides, most had also a two-part door at the rear).

The peak of its popularity was in the 1970s, with 18,200 made in 1978. In the 1980s the production decreased. When Poland became a democracy again in 1989 the future was bleak for the Nysa. Development work had been minimal for the past 20 years. Most customers, including the Police, chose more modern, faster and safer vans of Western manufacturers, that became widely imported instead. The production was closed in 1994, after manufacturing 380,575 vehicles.

Both Nysa and its sibling Żuk van were heavily based on the Warszawa, itself a licensed version of the Soviet GAZ-M20 Pobeda. Among others, it had the same wheelbase and engine. Its transmission and suspension were modified. Early variants of the Nysa were powered by the M20 petrol engine (R4 flathead, 2.12 L, 36.8 kW), most common was the newer S21 petrol engine (R4 OHV, 2.12l, 51.5 kW), used from 1964 onward. A big part of production was exported (in some years, 70%), mostly to Eastern Bloc countries, especially Bulgaria, Russia and Hungary, but also to West Germany and some Asian and African countries.

In Hungary the Nysa vans were almost exclusively used as ambulance cars; 777 of them were in use in 1987.

In 1968 the front end styling was changed, and the most numerous model 521/522 entered production, which remained in a largely unchanged form until the end. Nysa models included: N57 (1958), N58 (1958), N59, N60, N61, N63 (not produced), 501 (1964), 503 (not produced) and 521/522 (1968).

== Gallery ==
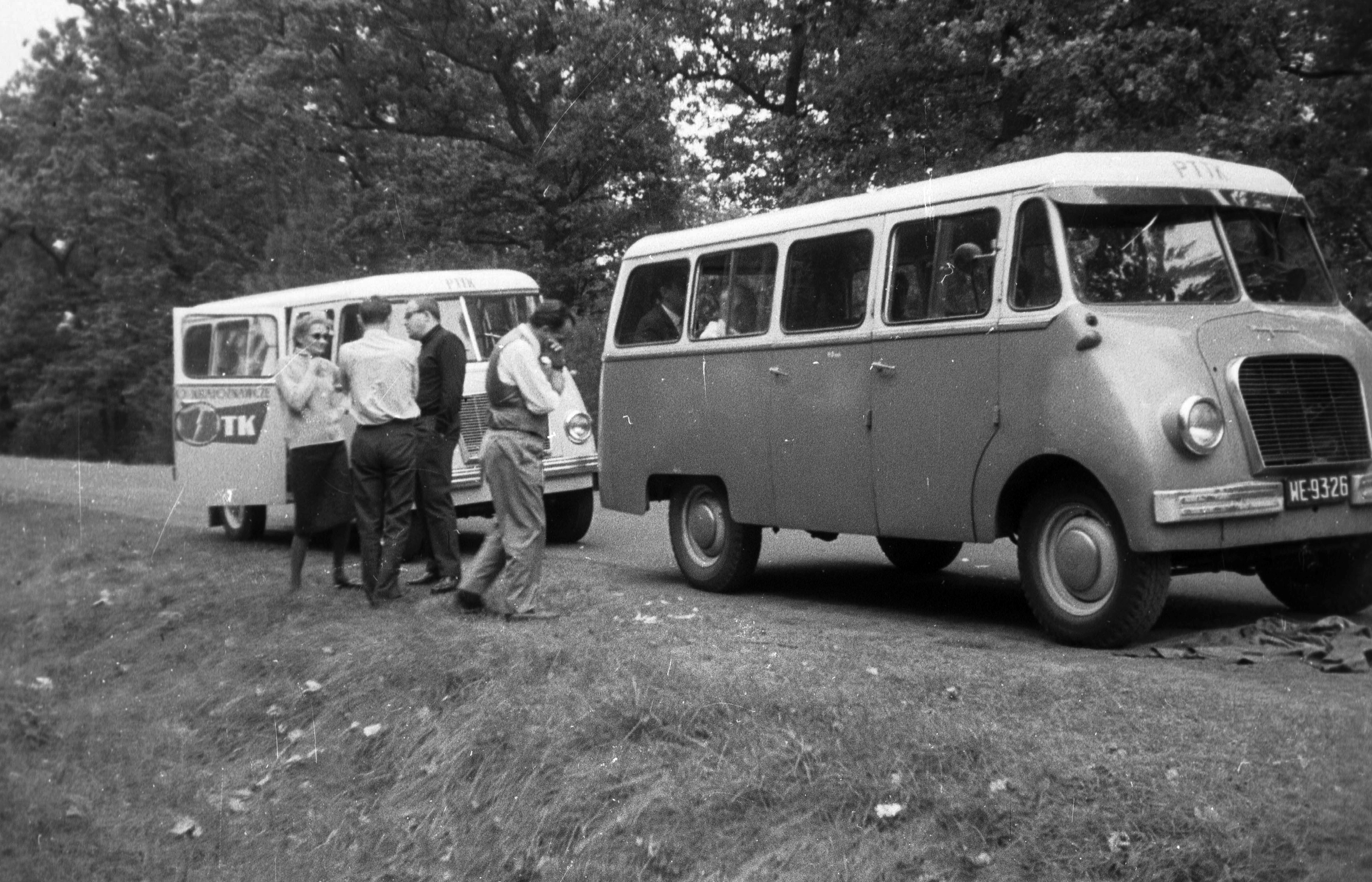
ZSD Nysa N57

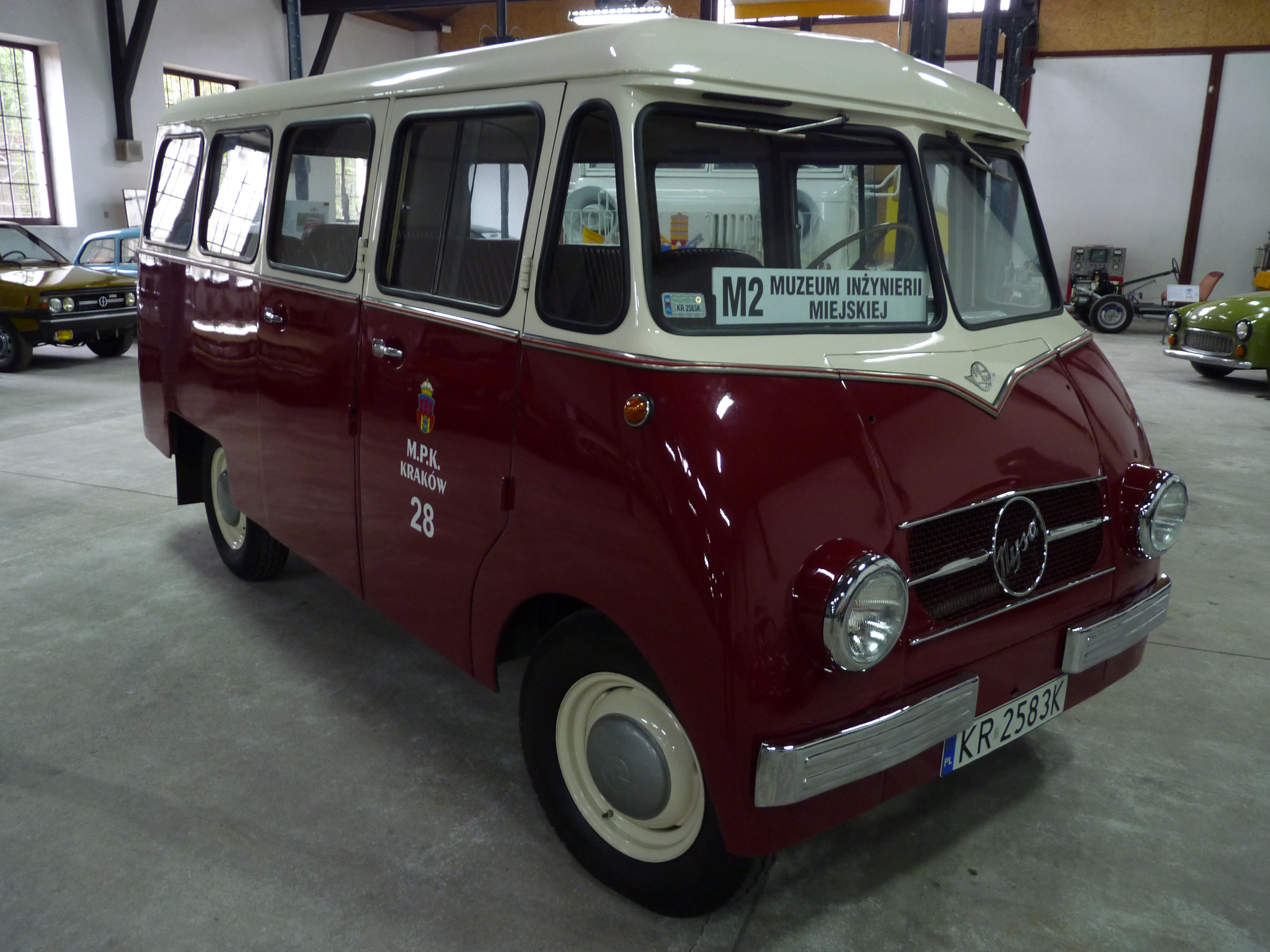
ZSD Nysa N59-M

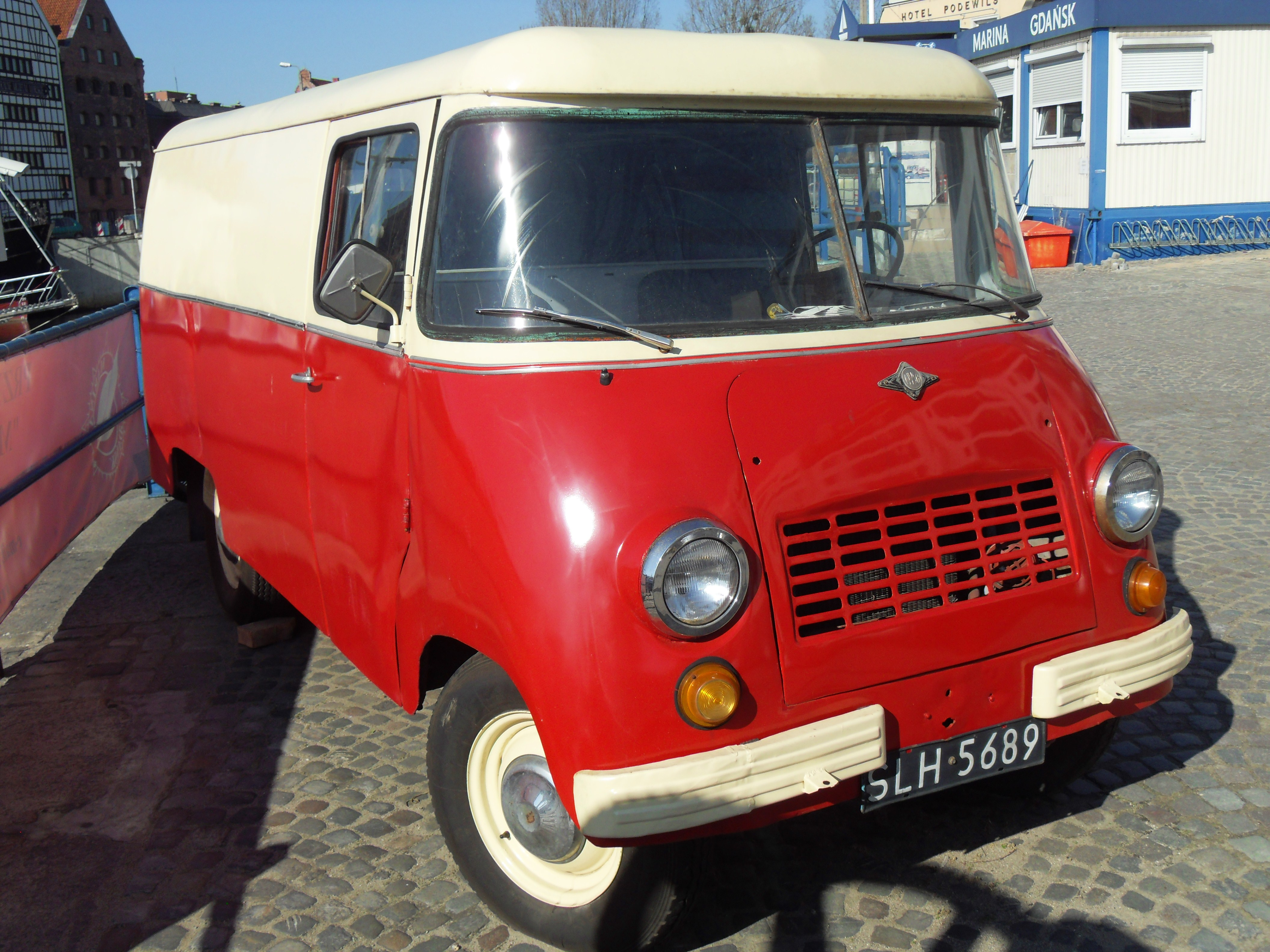
ZSD Nysa 501-F

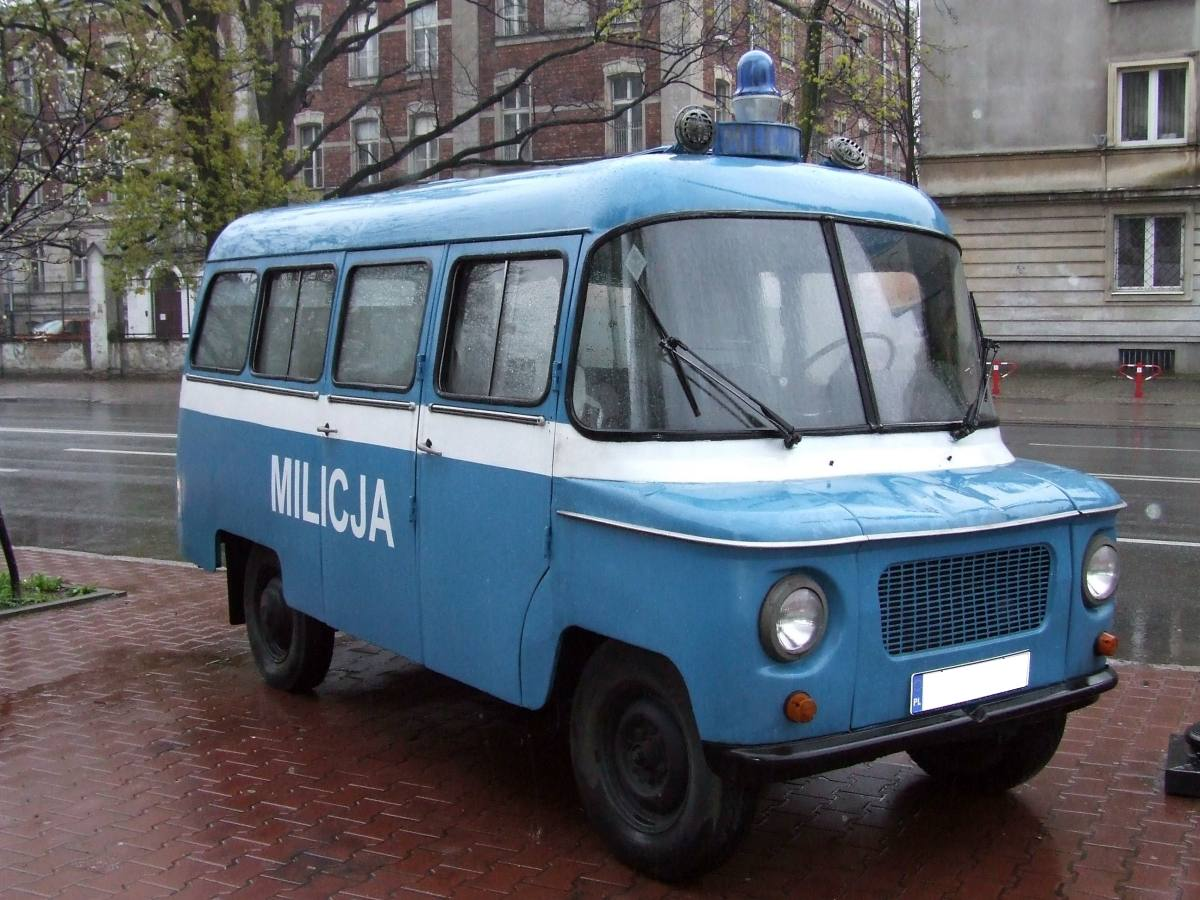
ZSD Nysa 522 police van

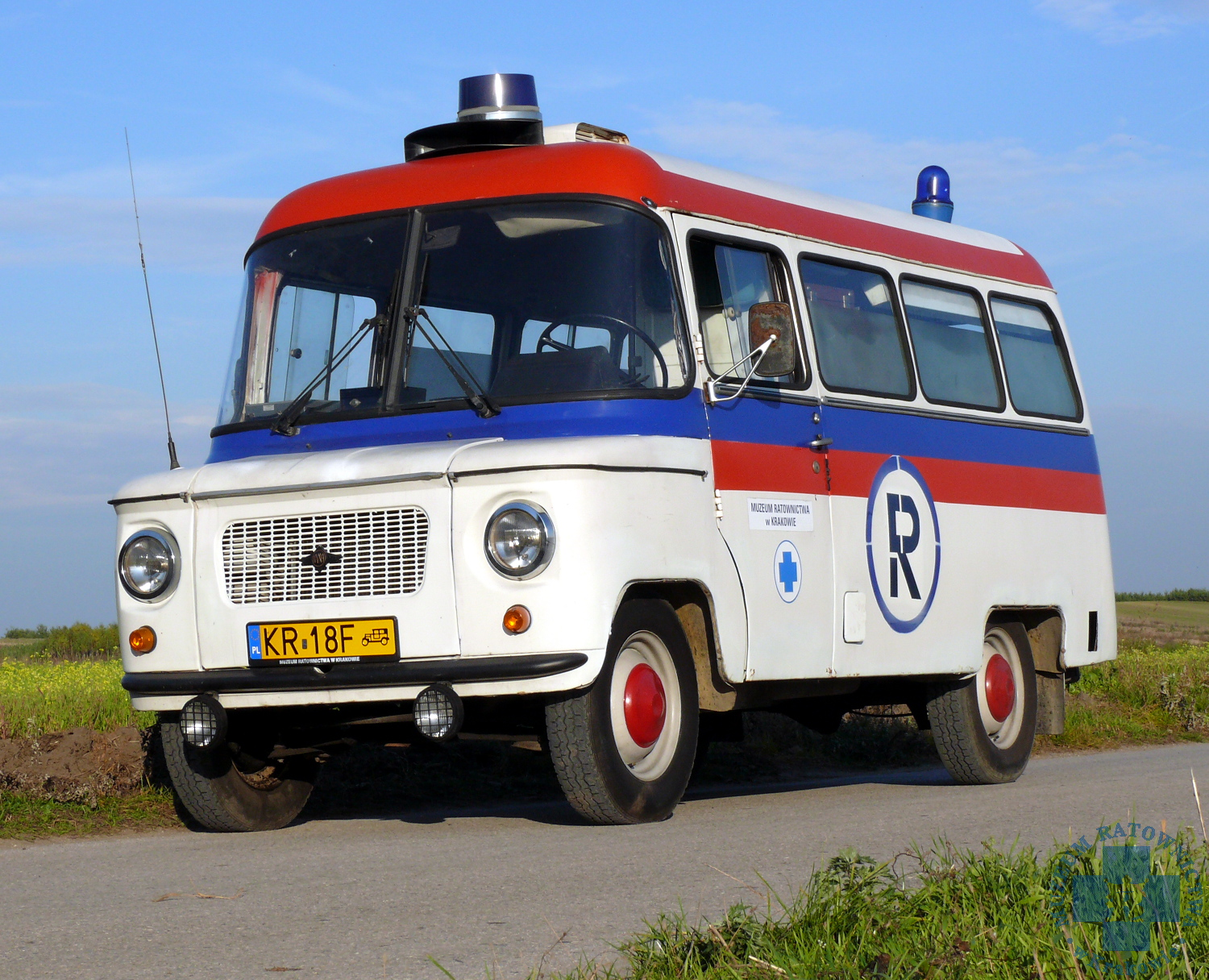
ZSD Nysa 522 ambulance
