= Yanase (car dealership) =

Japanese car dealership

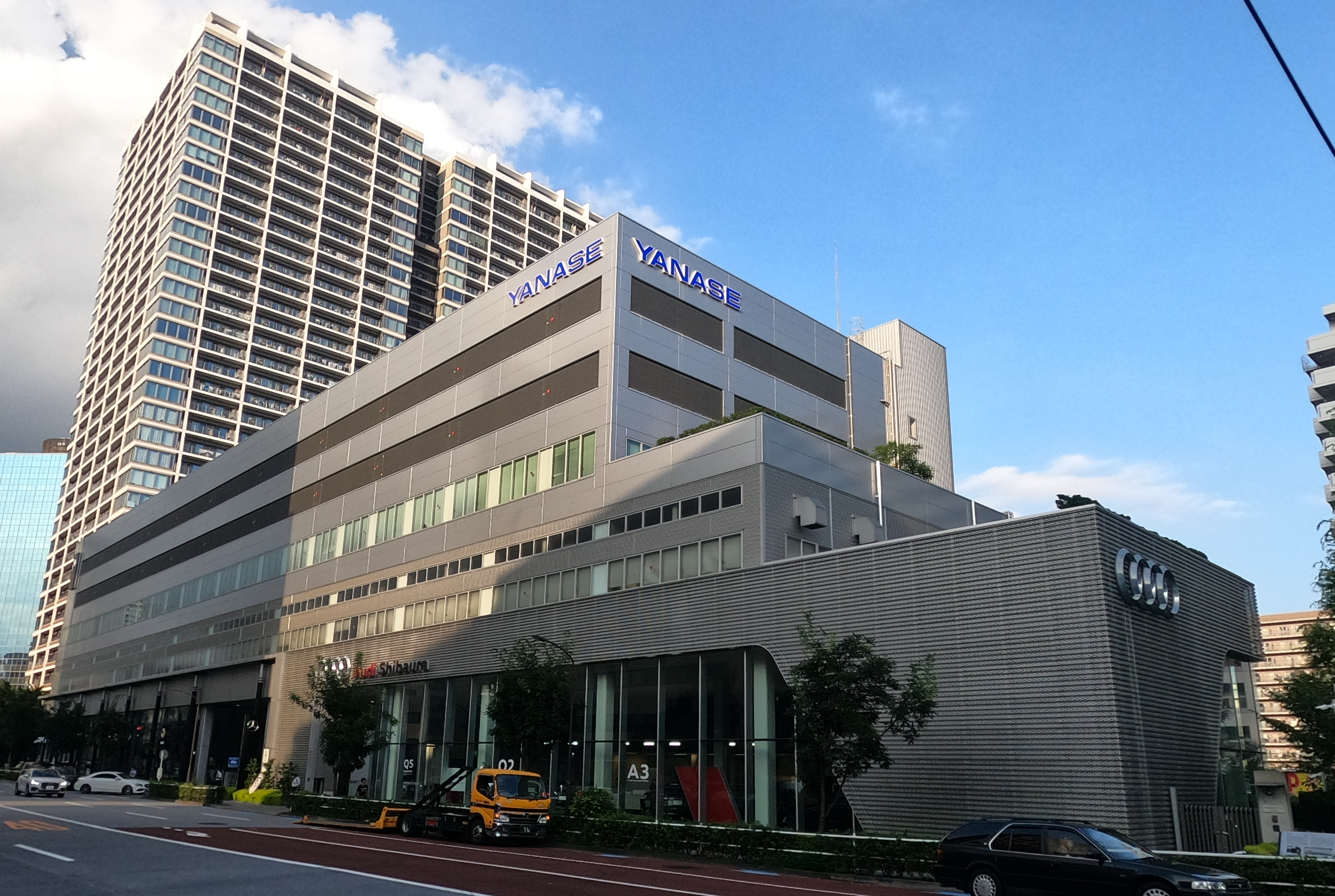
Yanase HQ (front building) at Shibaura, Tokyo

Yanase & Co., Ltd. (株式会社ヤナセ, Kabushiki gaisha Yanase) is a Japanese automotive dealership. It is a retailer of new European and North American vehicles and used cars in Japan. As of the year 2002, Yanase had the rights of exclusive retailer of Mercedes-Benz, Volkswagen, Audi, BMW, Volvo, Saab, Cadillac, Chevrolet, Chrysler, Jeep, Dodge and Smart vehicles to Japanese consumers. It is part of the Itochu group.

Yanase currently has 174 stores selling new cars in Japan and 31 stores that sell used cars under direct management. There is a related company or subsidiary organization dealing with a particular brand of imported cars, some in rural areas.

On May 25, 2015, the Yanase car dealership network celebrated its 100th anniversary.

== History ==
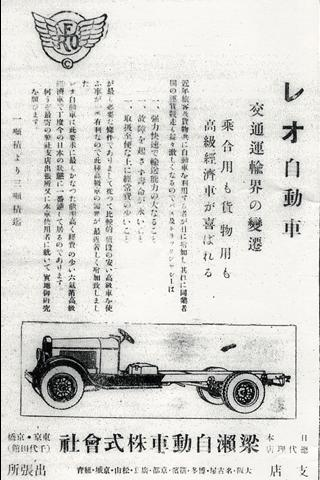
1929 REO advertisement sold at Yanase

Yanase was established in Hibiya, Tokyo in 1915 initially as a truck and bus builder by Chotarō Yanase, as a part of the Mitsui Group. By 1920 the company became an importer of General Motors products, primarily Buicks and Cadillacs. Yanase was born in Toyooka village (now Takasaki), Usui, Gunma, Japan December 5, 1879, and died July 11, 1956. He was a graduate of the Tokyo Commercial High School, having earlier attended Tokyo Metropolitan High School at Hibiya. After graduation from the Tokyo Commercial High School in 1904, he worked for the Mitsui OSK Shipping Lines when the company was previously known as Osaka Shipping. When Yanase began the importing company with Mitsui, he also imported petroleum mineral oil products. The mineral oil business became Yanase Shoji Co. Ltd. while the importing of automobiles became Yanase Automobile Co. Ltd, where Mr. Yanase served as president. The automobile business was in danger of going bankrupt, until the Great Kantō earthquake of 1923, where his company was instrumental in importing General Motors GMC trucks to help with the disaster recovery efforts, and continued to provide vehicles as the transportation infrastructure was rebuilt. Mr. Yanase was abroad on a business trip, and when he learned there was an earthquake back home, he immediately exported to Japan 2,000 Chevrolet Superior trucks to assist in the recovery efforts. Yanase also imported REO Motor Car Company vehicles and chassis.

After World War II, Yanase resumed importing operations, selling Cadillac, Mercedes-Benz, and Volkswagen under the direction of Yanase's son, ill|Jiro Yanase. Jiro Yanase was born June 28, 1916, and died on March 13, 2008. He was inducted into the Japan Automotive Hall of Fame in 2001, and the North American Automotive Hall of Fame in 2004 for his contributions in pioneering the Japanese automobile industry. He attended Keio High School and graduated from Keio University in 1939, with a degree in economics, and soon began to work for his father's company, with a position on the board of directors in 1941, CEO in 1945, and chairman in 1985.

Due to the vehicles being imported, Yanase had a reputation of selling large luxury cars, because European and North American vehicles did not comply with Japanese government regulations concerning exterior dimensions and engine displacement. Therefore, vehicles imported by Yanase were taxed for their larger dimensions. A meeting with the then Japanese Prime Minister Shigeru Yoshida (1946 to 1947 and from 1948 to 1954) convinced Jiro Yanase that imported cars should be sold as a luxury good, making imported vehicles more expensive than Japanese domestically produced vehicles, thereby allowing Japanese companies to sell their products that were priced lower than imported vehicles. During the economic expansion period starting in the early 1970s, Yanase dealerships progressed across Japan as a retailer of imported vehicles that had a luxury reputation. In 1965, import standards were relaxed to allow the importation of left-hand drive vehicles into Japan, as Japanese vehicles made for Japan are right-hand drive.

=== 1990s and forward ===
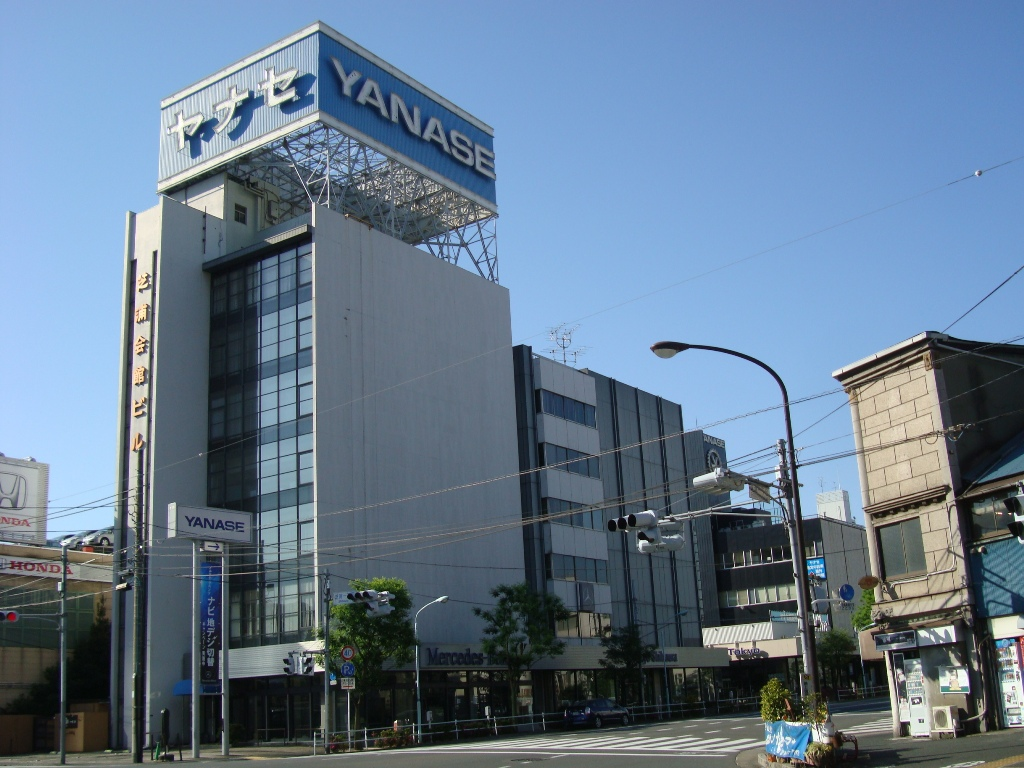
Former headquarters (2011)

In 1992, the Volkswagen Group, whose products were Yanase's main business, cut their ties with the company in order to directly distribute vehicles in Japan. Yanase shifted to selling Opels beginning in 1993 (and other GM products), but the brand was not successful enough to sustain the company. As of 2000, Yanase worked out a deal where Audi directly imported their vehicles but allowed their products to be sold at Yanase dealerships as well. Volkswagen and Opel followed suit shortly thereafter; as of 2005, Mercedes-Benz, Volvo, and BMW reached similar agreements with Yanase. Yanase therefore focuses on its European and American car dealership network as it faces new rivals, such as Seibu Department Stores. As of 2005, when Yanase relinquished the license to import Unimogs, they stopped being an importer, completing the change to being a distributor network.

Yanase also sells used North American and European vehicles through their "Brand Square" locations throughout Japan.

== Vehicles currently sold in Japan ==
- Mercedes-Benz
- Smart
- BMW (vehicles and motorcycles)
- Volkswagen (1953 to 1992, 2005 ~ )
- Audi (1967 to 1992, 2002 ~ )
- Cadillac
- Chevrolet
- Porsche (2018 ~ )
- Hongqi (2021 ~ )
- BYD (2022 ~ )
- Ferrari (2024 ~ )
- Zeekr (2025 ~ )

== Vehicles previously sold in Japan ==
- Prince Motor Company (until merger of Nissan in 1966)
- Isuzu (special arrangement to sell Geo Storm and Isuzu Piazza Nero Irmscher)
- Buick
- Pontiac
- Saturn
- Oldsmobile
- Vauxhall
- Opel (1993–2006)
- Hummer
- Saab (1997–2011)
- Renault (1994-2000: Renaults were imported and sold through Yanase's wholly owned subsidiary France Motors. After Renault's 1999 acquisition of Nissan, the licensing contract with Renault was cancelled in the spring of the following year, and Nissan took over as the sole licensee. Renault sales were transferred to Nissan Red Stage dealerships. Renault Japon Co., Ltd. is currently a wholly owned subsidiary of Nissan.)
- Dodge
- Volvo Cars
- Chrysler
- Jeep
