= Isuzu Gemini =

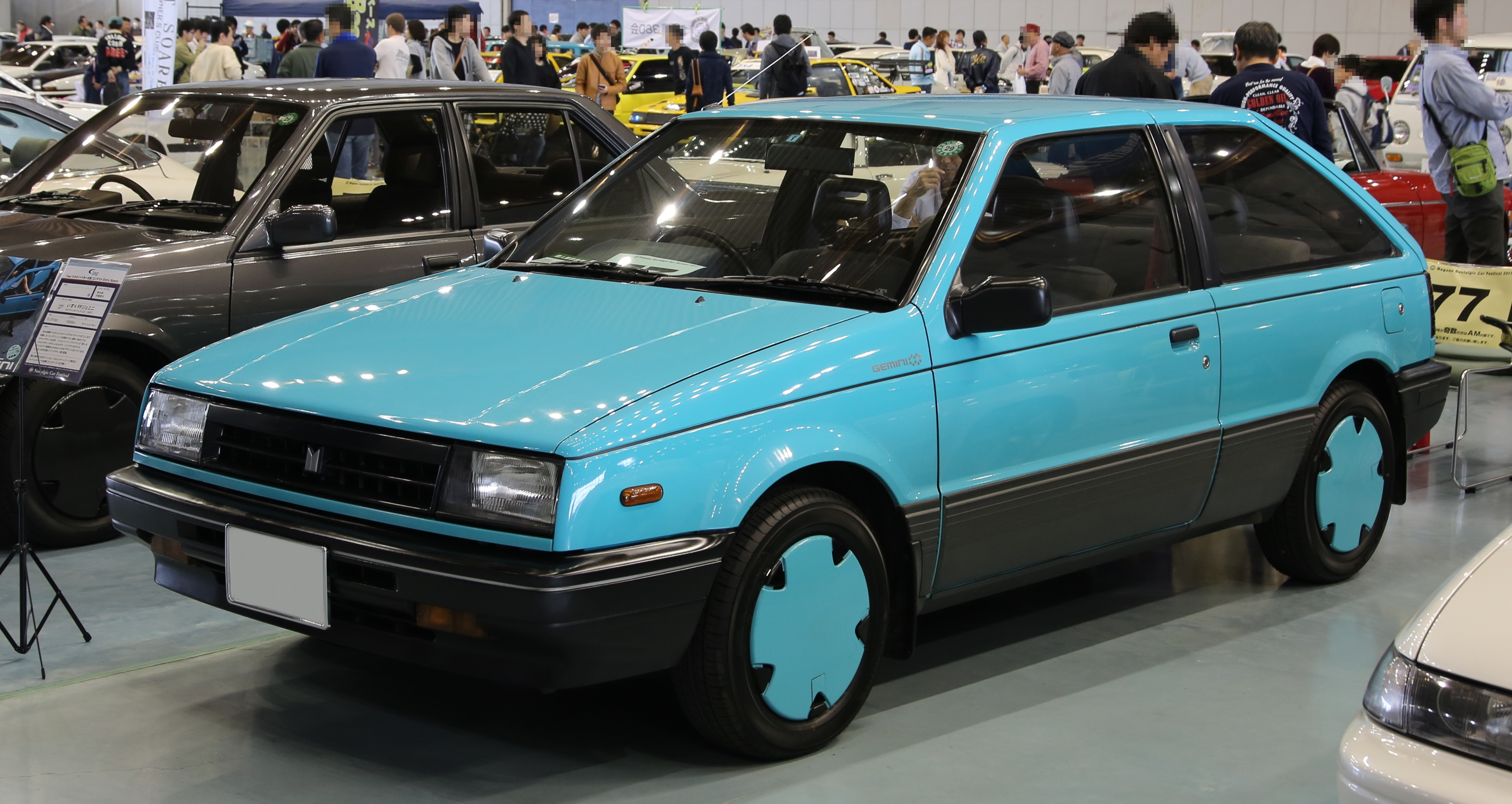
- Isuzu Gemini FF hatchback

Overview
- Manufacturer: Isuzu (1974–1993); Honda (1993–2000)
- Production: 1974–2000 (Japan)
- Assembly: Japan: Kawasaki, Kanagawa (Kawasaki Plant: 1974–2000); Philippines: Dasmariñas, Cavite (GM Pilipinas; first and second generation models)

Body and chassis
- Class: Subcompact car
- Layout: FR layout (1974–1987); FF layout (1985–2000); Front engine, four-wheel drive (1990–1993)

Chronology
- Predecessor: Isuzu Bellett

The Isuzu Gemini (Japanese: いすゞ・ジェミニ) is a subcompact car produced by the Japanese automaker Isuzu from 1974 until 2000. The same basic product was built and/or sold under several other names, sometimes by General Motors brands, in various markets around the world. While the first generation was of a rear-wheel drive design, later versions were all front-wheel-drive, and the last two generations were no more than badge-engineered Honda Domani until the name was retired in 2000.

== First generation (1974) ==
First generation (PF)
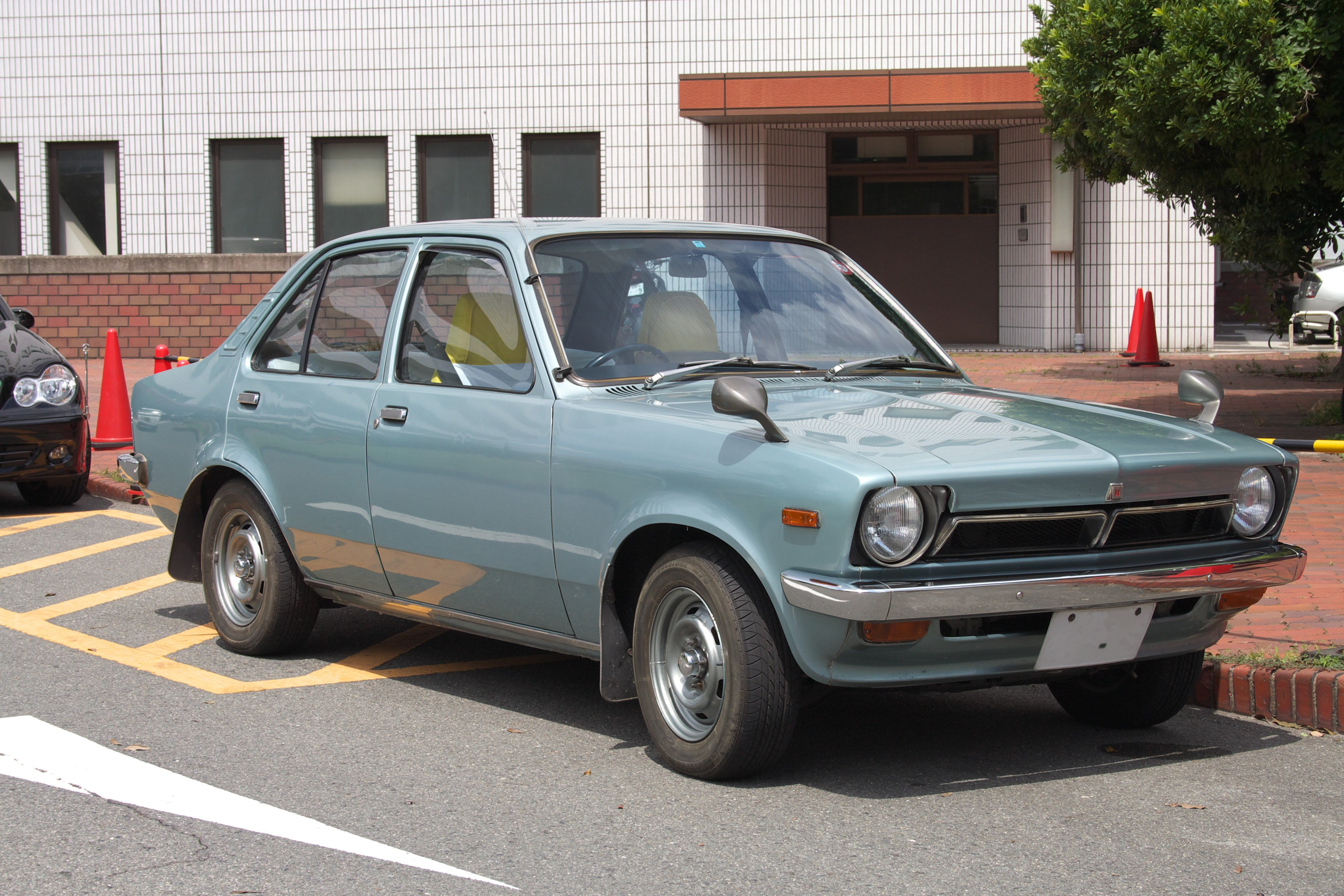
- 1974 Isuzu Bellet Gemini

Overview
- Also called: Isuzu Bellett Gemini (Japan; 1974–1975); Isuzu I-Mark (North America); Buick Opel (US); Holden Gemini; Opel by Isuzu (US); Opel Gemini (Malaysia and Thailand); Opel Kadett C (Germany); Saehan Gemini/Bird (South Korea)
- Production: November 1974 – February 1987

Body and chassis
- Body style: 2-door coupé; 4-door sedan
- Layout: FR layout
- Platform: T-body
- Related: Isuzu Piazza; Chevrolet Chevette; Daewoo Maepsy; Opel Kadett; Vauxhall Chevette

Powertrain
- Engine: petrol: 1584 cc G161Z I4; 1817 cc G180Z I4; 1817 cc G180W DOHC I4; diesel: 1817 cc 4FB1 I4; 1817 cc 4FB1T turbo I4

Dimensions
- Wheelbase: 2,405 mm (94.7 in)
- Length: 4,135 mm (162.8 in)
- Width: 1,570 mm (61.8 in)
- Height: 1,365 mm (53.7 in)
- Curb weight: 930 kg (2,050 lb)

Chronology
- Predecessor: Opel Kadett & Opel 1900 (Buick Opel)

The first Gemini was initially sold as the Bellett Gemini to connect it to its predecessor when it was introduced in November 1974. The "Bellett" portion of the name was dropped in April 1975. It was based on the third-generation Opel Kadett C on the General Motors T-car platform and came in four-door sedan and two-door coupe body styles. The chassis code was PF50, although the later 1.8-liter versions were called PF60 and the diesels PFD60.

In June 1977, the Gemini received its first, light, facelift, including a simplified grille with a honeycomb mesh. The bigger 1817 cc G180 series engine from the Florian and 117 Coupé also became available, fitted with rectangular headlights rather than the round units used on the 1600 as well as larger, black rubber bumpers. This model offered 110 PS (81 kW), although this output dropped to 105 PS (77 kW) if an automatic transmission was fitted. The 1800 came in LT and LS models (coupé and sedan, 4/5-speed manual or automatic) and also as the coupé-only LS/G, which received the five-speed manual transmission as standard fitment, along with large graphics on the side and a first for a home market Japanese car: high pressure headlight washers.

In November of the same year the 1600 was also updated, now fitted with square headlights and an engine with the I·CAS oxidation catalyst ("Isuzu Clean Air System") which could manage the 1978 emissions standards. Power is 100 PS (74 kW), 94 PS (69 kW) for automatics. One year later the Gemini 1800's engine was also upgraded to meet the 1978 emissions standards. Power remained unchanged, and the automatic now offered the same power as cars with manual transmission. The ignition system was changed to a transistorless type, and the trunk lid was now opened remotely (not added to the Gemini 1600 until the end of December). The Gemini Black and 1800 Minx were also added, the Minx with a two-tone paintjob and the Black with black paintwork and more sporty yet comfortable equipment including alloy wheels.

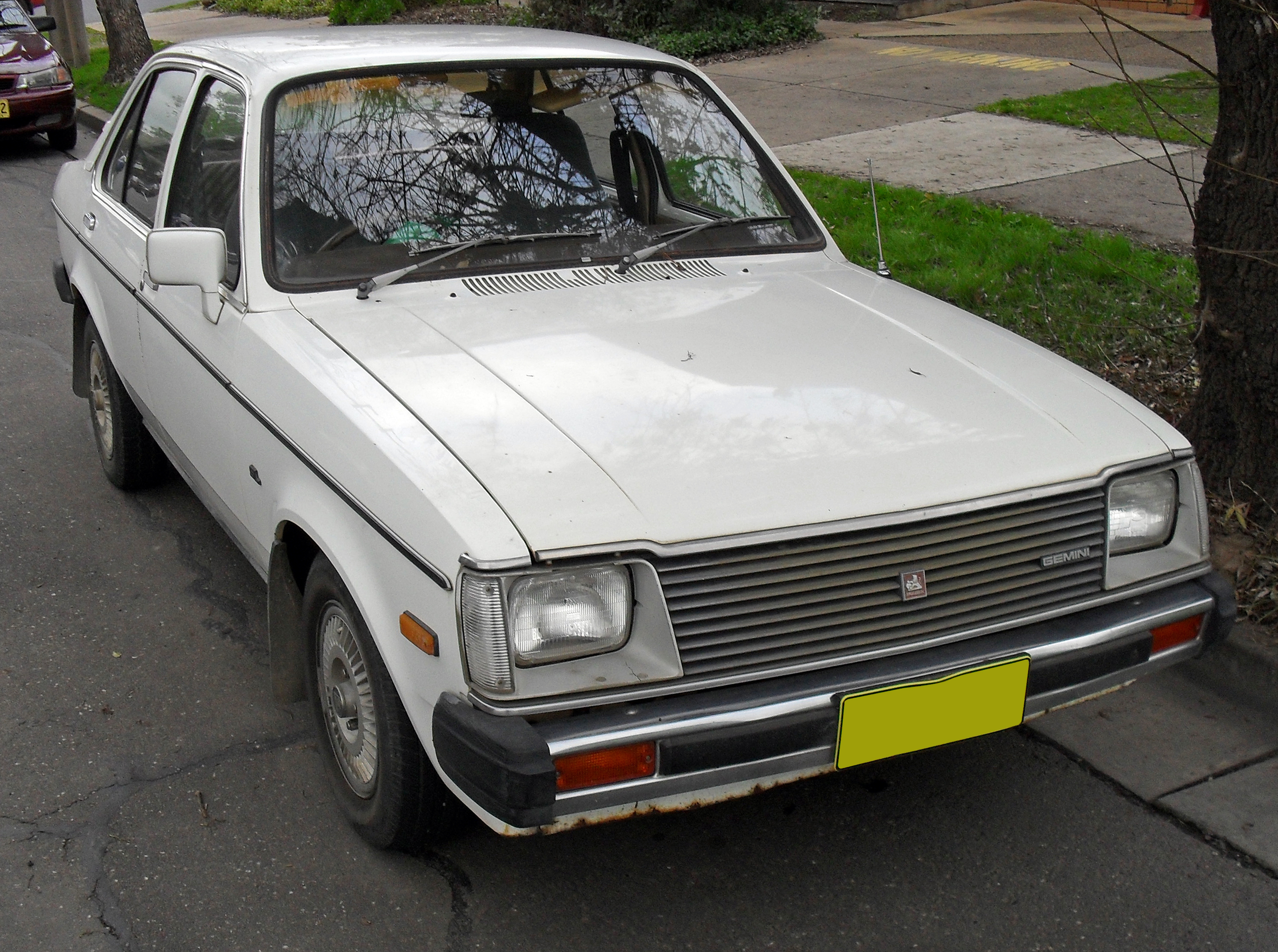
1979 facelift Holden Gemini (Holden built and badged version for the Australian market)

In June 1979, the Gemini received a new slant nose with rectangular headlights and a redesigned rear end. The changes were actually more comprehensive than that, also including a redesigned (longer) engine bay and a wider radiator opening for two new engines added in November (the twin cam G180W and the new 4FB1 diesel) which both required wider radiators for more air for cooling.

In Japan, sports models were available originally with the "ZZ" name. Later, ZZ/L (1980), ZZ/R (1981), ZZ/T, and ZZ/E models were added. These were equipped with an Isuzu G180W, eight-valve DOHC 1.8-liter engine, most commonly fuel-injected, producing 130 PS (96 kW) at 6400 rpm. These models also came with a shortened remote throw manual shift lever and optional factory LSD differential. There was also a mildly sporting model of the OHC 1800, called the LS/G.

In October 1982, a version of the diesel with Bosch VE electronic fuel injection was also added; this provided 8% more power than the regular version (66 versus 61 PS) and was fitted to the LT-E and LJ-E models. For those who wanted more, a 73 PS (54 kW) turbo diesel appeared a month later. Also featuring electronic fuel injection, this model also received a standard rear anti-roll bar. Counterintuitively, the two more powerful diesels were never available with the coupé bodywork.

The Gemini was complemented in 1981 by the Giugiaro-designed coupé Isuzu Piazza, based on the Gemini's platform, which was introduced in the United States in 1983 as the Isuzu Impulse and in Australia in 1986 as the Holden Piazza. After the front-wheel-drive second generation Gemini appeared in early 1985, the old rear-wheel drive version nonetheless continued to be built. The coupé model was discontinued, and a slimmed down sedan range (including the ZZ and diesel models) continued to be available. This diminished range was produced until February 1987, when the rear-wheel drive Gemini was laid to rest after 768,537 had been built.

=== In other markets ===
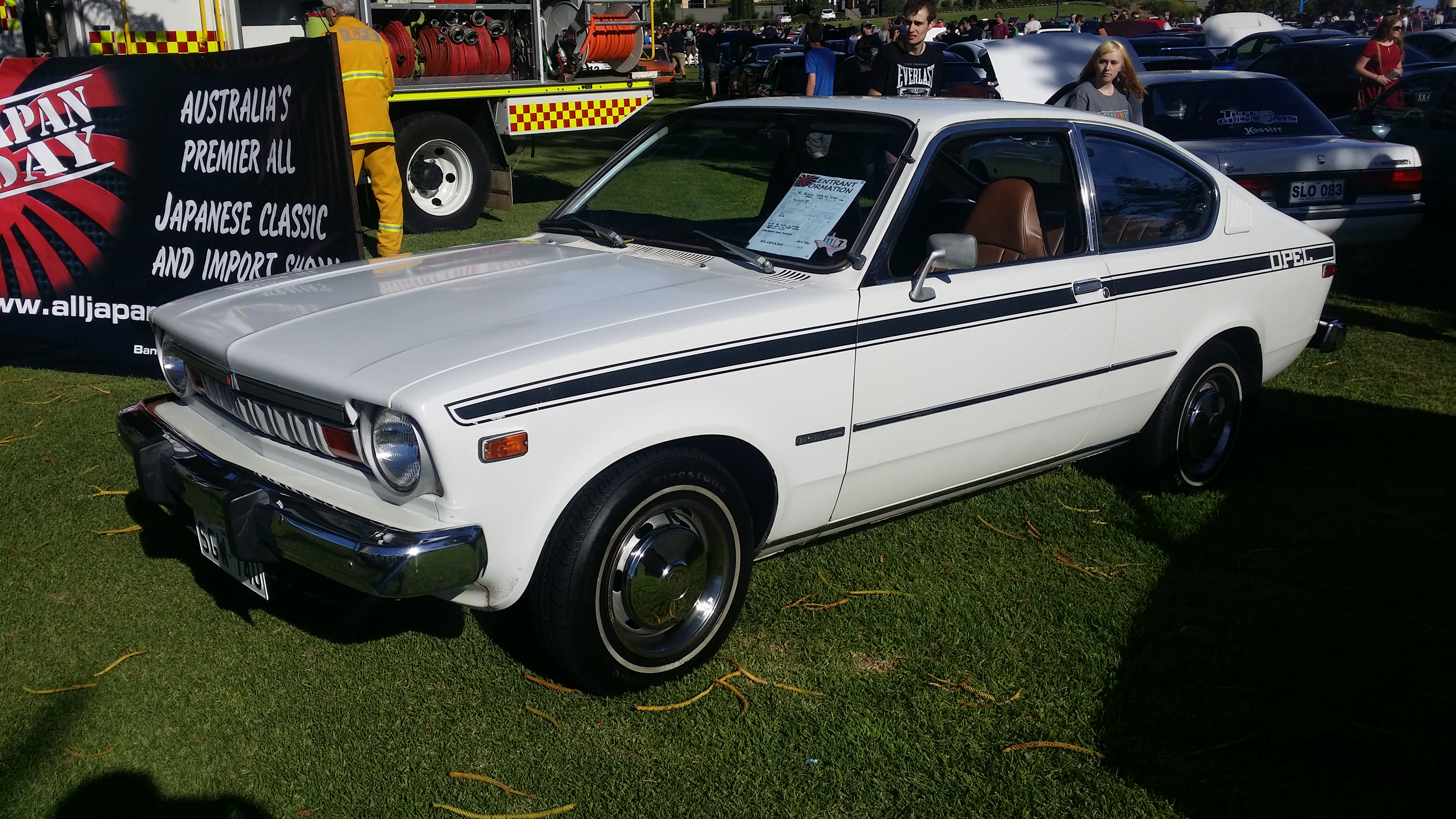
1976 Opel by Isuzu, a rebadging for the US

==== North America ====
The North American market version was originally sold as the "Opel by Isuzu" and then the Buick Opel (sometimes referred to as the "Buick Isuzu Opel"). It first appeared in late 1975, for the 1976 model year, and replaced the German-built Kadett which had become too expensive as a result of the weakening dollar and rising costs in Germany. Road & Track decried the switch, stating that the Isuzu felt "built to a price" and that unlike the real Opel, it was "one of our least favorite cars." In 1978 a "Sports Coupé" was added to the lineup, its changes being limited to the paint, different steel wheels, sporty mirrors, and a spoiler. For 1979 the car received a light cosmetic update with ribbed velour trim, a few new paint options, and rectangular headlights.

18,801 model year 1978 Buick Opels were sold, followed by 17,564 in 1979. In the middle of the calendar year the model was dropped, but supplies lasted long enough for another 950 cars to be sold during 1980.

For the 1981 model year, the "Buick Opel" metamorphosed into the "Isuzu I-Mark". Unlike the Buick-badged versions the I-Mark was also available with a diesel engine, but the standard engine was a 78 hp (58 kW) (SAE net) version of the 1.8 litre G180Z engine. The diesel had a claimed 51 hp (38 kW) (SAE net) at an unusually high 5,000 rpm. The I-Mark was offered with four-door sedan or two-door coupé bodywork with either engine, in Deluxe or fully equipped LS (added for the 1982 model year) trim. A 5-speed manual or a 3-speed automatic were on offer. There was also a base diesel-engined coupé on offer, with a 4-speed manual transmission only. The diesel gradually lost sales after USA's brief love affair with the diesel car came to an end in the early eighties, and eventually it was only available in a single coupé version. For 1985, the rear-wheel-drive I-Mark's last year, only the Deluxe sedan version with the gasoline engine remained available. Power remained at 78 hp (58 kW) at 4,800 rpm.

==== Australasia ====
Early Australian cars, from the 1975 launch, were badged Holden-Isuzu. In addition to sedan and coupé models, Holden in Australia produced the Gemini as a three-door station wagon and three-door panel van, which were derived from the Opel Kadett C Caravan and Vauxhall Chevette wagon, with Isuzu Gemini front panels. The panel van's side panels came from the Bedford Chevanne. The Australian Holden Gemini was fitted with an Isuzu G161Z petrol engine, although 1979 and later models were available with a 1.8-litre 8-valve SOHC diesel engine (4FB1). The more common G161Z was a 1.6-liter 8-valve SOHC fed by a Nikki carburettor. The Holden Gemini was Wheels Car of the Year for 1975.

It was also assembled and sold in New Zealand from 1977 to 1984. The car received Isuzu badging for the first few years in this market, as the brand had already been established by the earlier Bellett, which had also been assembled locally.

==== Other markets ====
In the few European markets where it was available, the Gemini was equipped with the 1.6-liter engine which produced 68 PS DIN (50 kW) there; compression ratio and other specifications were largely unchanged and the discrepancy in stated power (down 32 percent) may have been entirely due to the differences to the SAE (gross) measuring system used on Japanese market cars.

Isuzu Gemini was also sold in South Korea as the Saehan Gemini, whose manufacturer became Daewoo Motors in 1982. It then became Daewoo Maepsy after 1982 and remained on sale (later as the Maepsy-Na after a facelift) until it was replaced by the Daewoo LeMans in 1986. It continued to be assembled as a taxi model called Maepsy Sigma until 1989.

Sold as:

- 1975–1984 – Holden Gemini – Australia, New Zealand, Indonesia, Kuwait
- 1975–1983 – Opel Gemini – Malaysia, Thailand
- Opel Kadett C - Germany
- 1976-1987 – Chevrolet Chevette – Brazil
- 1976–1979 – Opel Isuzu/Buick Opel – United States
- 1977–1982 – Saehan Gemini – South Korea ("Saehan Bird" in the export)
- 1982–1986 – Saehan/Daewoo Maepsy/Maepsy-Na/Maepsy Sigma – South Korea
- 1982–1988 – Saehan/Daewoo Max – pickup version, South Korea
- 1981–1984 – Isuzu I-Mark – North America
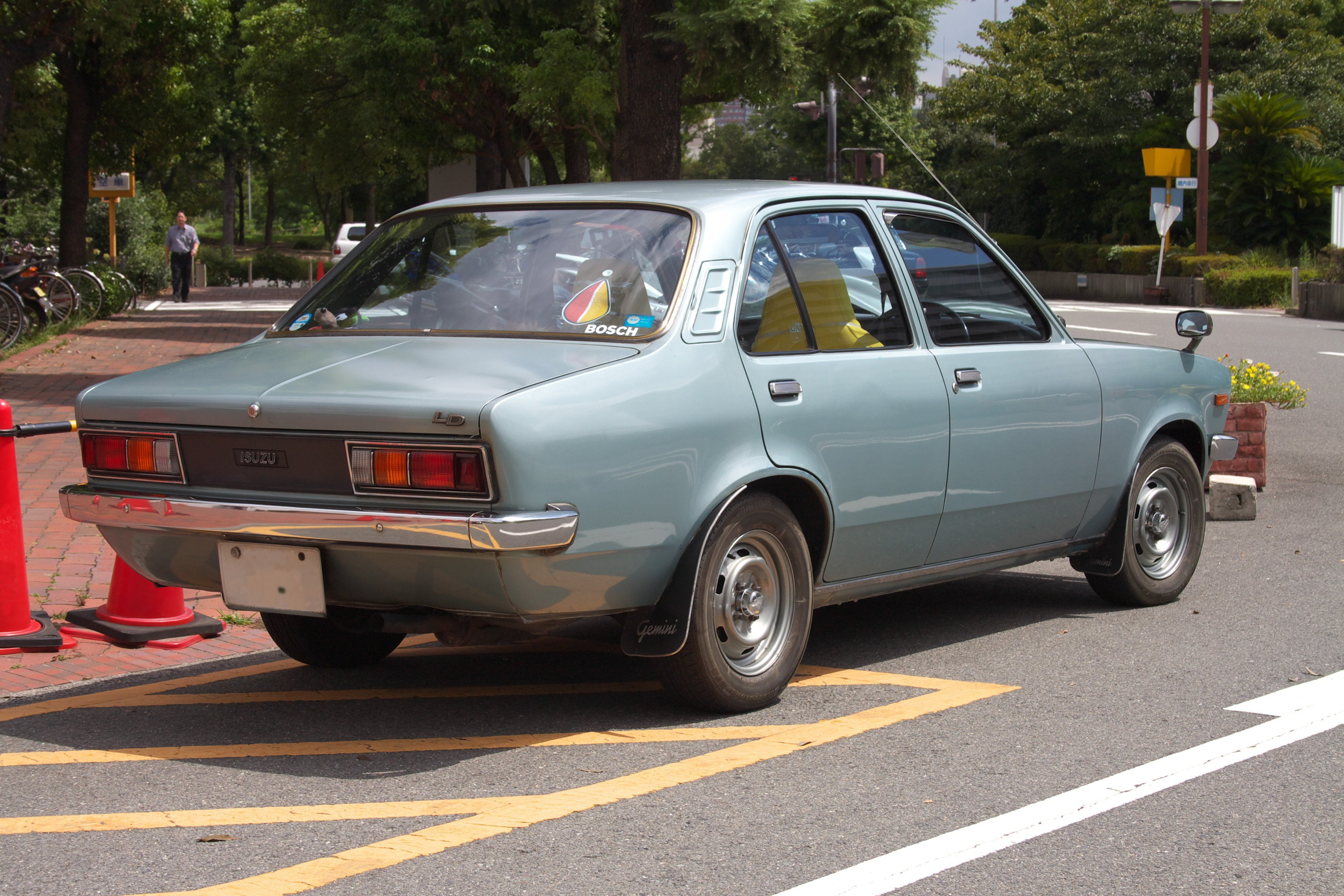
Rear view of early Gemini four-door (Japan)

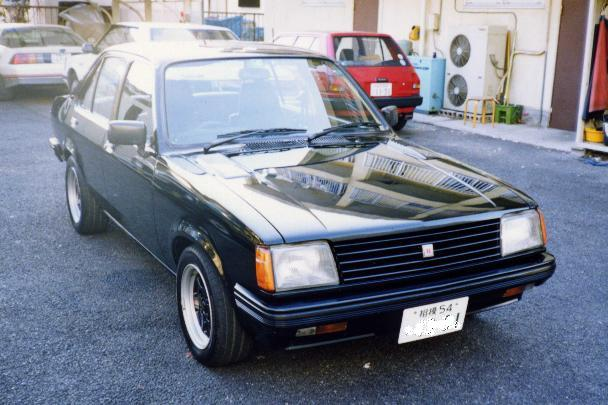
Post-1983 Gemini ZZ-R (PF60)

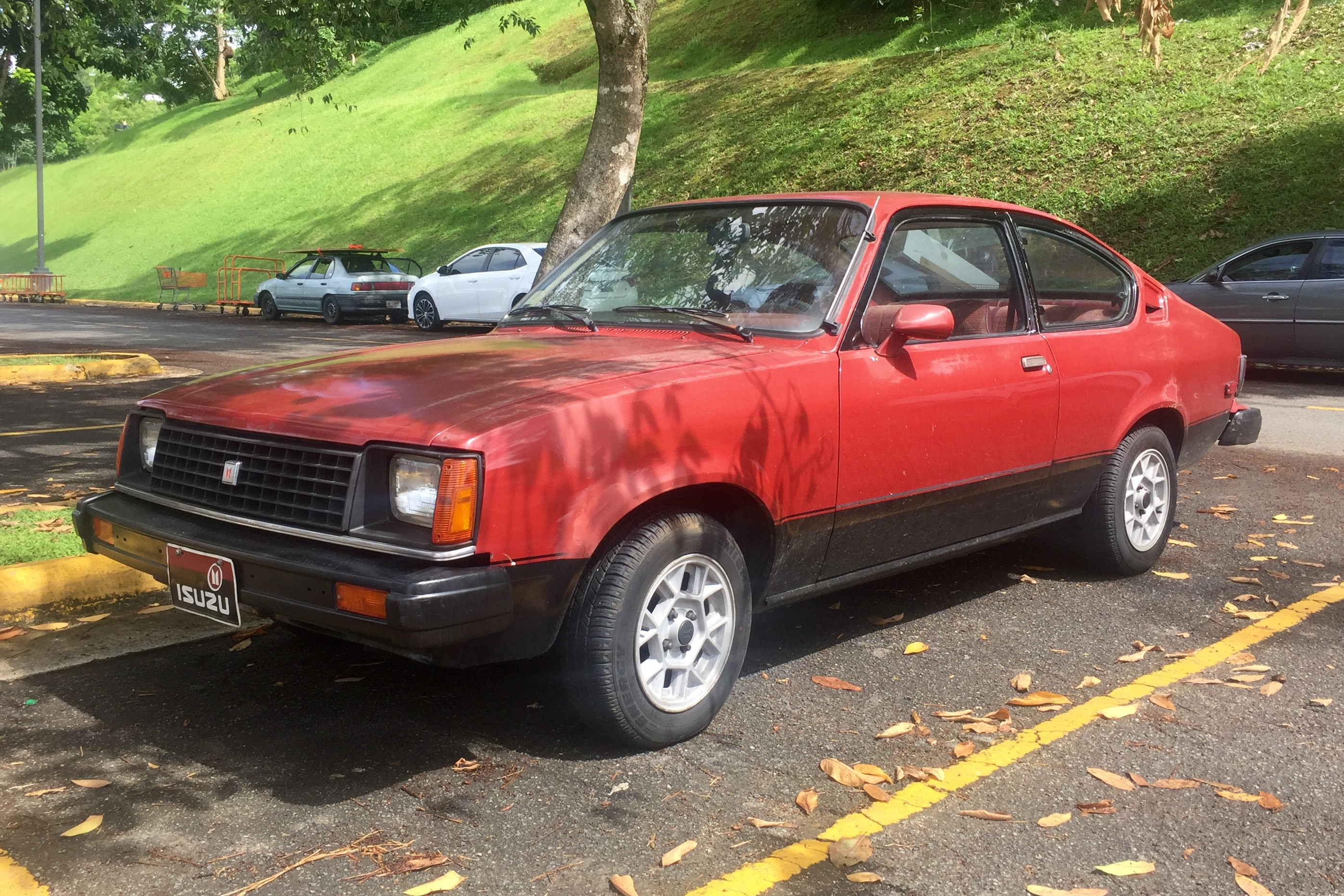
Isuzu I-Mark Coupé (North America)

== Second generation (1985) ==
Second generation
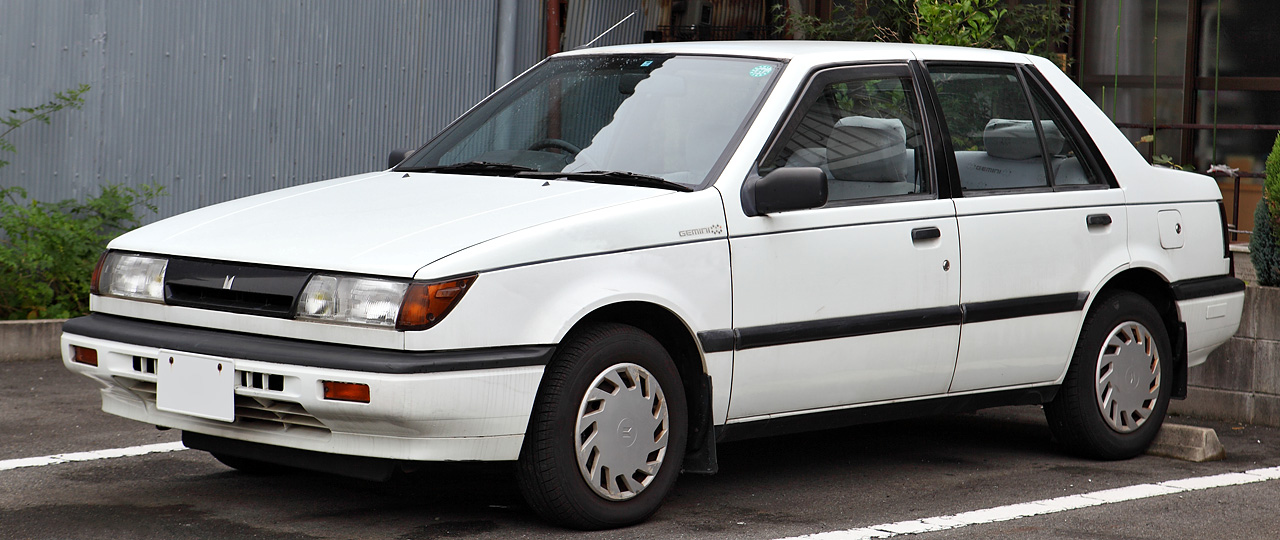

Overview
- Also called: Isuzu I-Mark; Chevrolet Spectrum; Geo Spectrum; Pontiac Sunburst; Chevrolet Gemini; Holden Gemini
- Production: 1985–1990
- Designer: Giorgetto Giugiaro

Body and chassis
- Body style: 3-door hatchback; 4-door sedan
- Layout: FF layout
- Platform: R-body

Powertrain
- Engine: 1297 cc 4XB1 I4 (JT140, export only); 1471 cc 4XC1 (LC5) I4 (JT150); 1471 cc 4XC1-T (LC0) turbo I4 (JT150); 1588 cc 4XE1 DOHC I4 (JT190); 1487 cc 4EC1 diesel/TD I4 (JT600)
- Transmission: 3-speed automatic; 5-speed manual; 5-speed semi-automatic (NAVi5)

Dimensions
- Wheelbase: 2,400 mm (94.5 in)
- Length: Hatchback: 3,995 mm (157.3 in); Sedan: 4,070 mm (160.2 in)
- Width: 1,615 mm (63.6 in)
- Height: 1,370–1,405 mm (53.9–55.3 in)

Chronology
- Predecessor: Chevrolet Chevette (Spectrum); Opel Isuzu (I-Mark); Pontiac Acadian (Sunburst)
- Successor: Isuzu Stylus (I-Mark); Passport Optima (Sunburst); Geo Storm (Spectrum, hatchback); Geo Prizm (Spectrum, sedan)

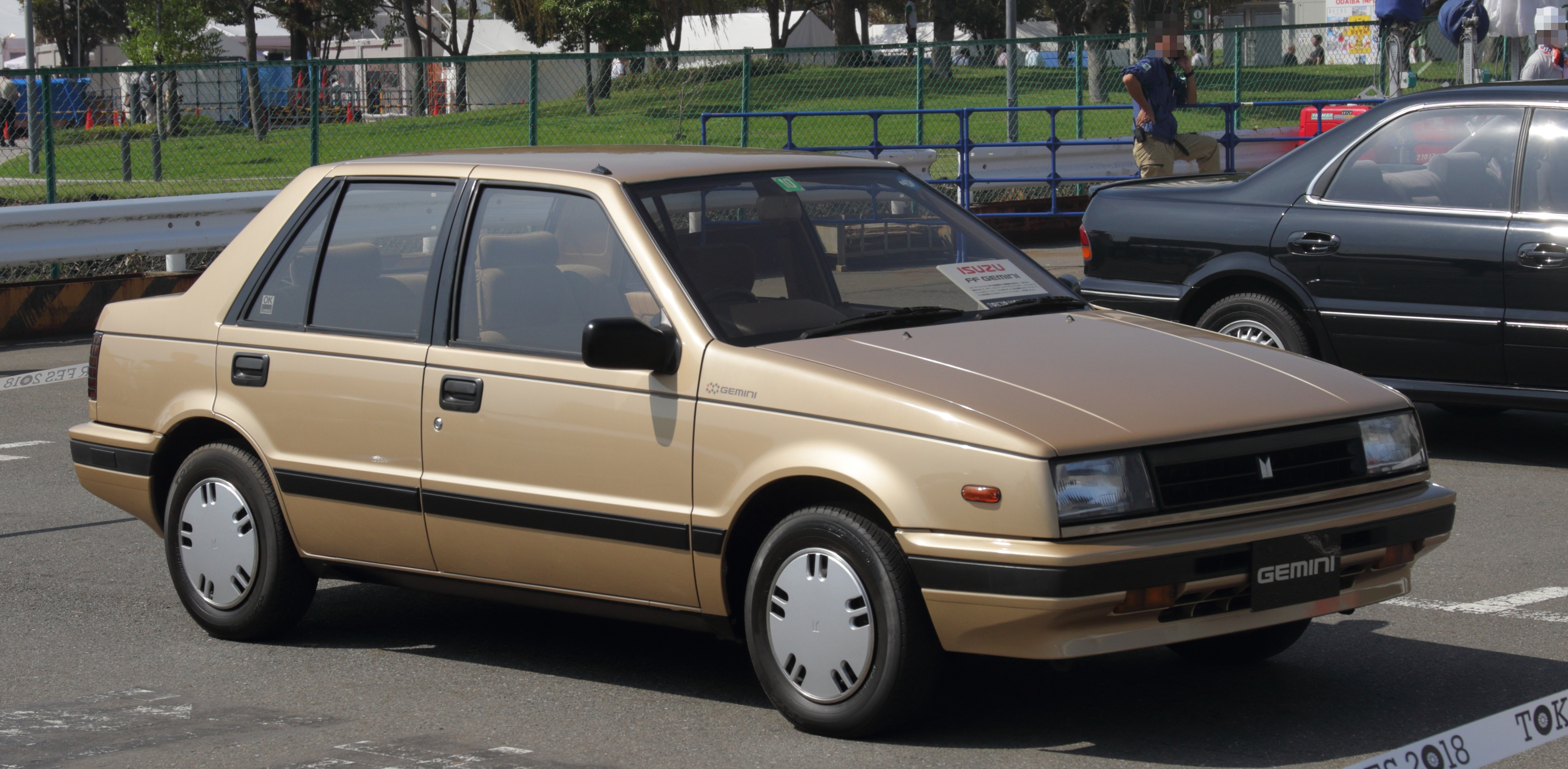
Pre-facelift Gemini FF (JT150)

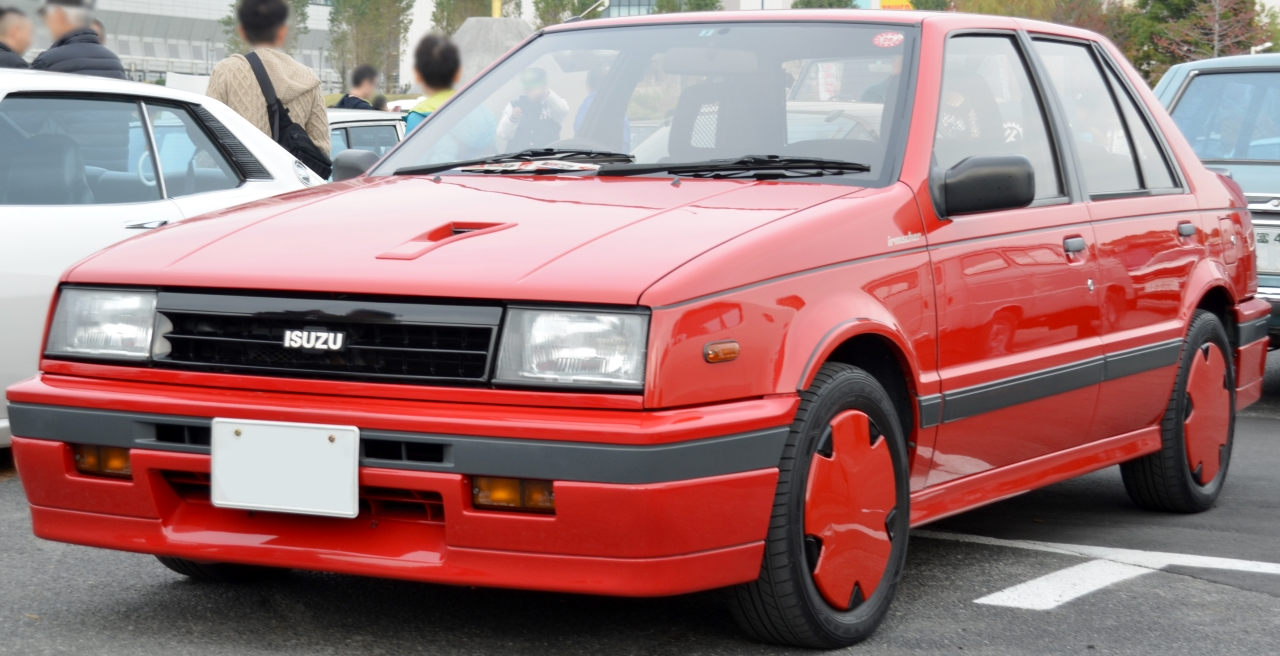
Pre-facelift Gemini Irmscher (JT150)

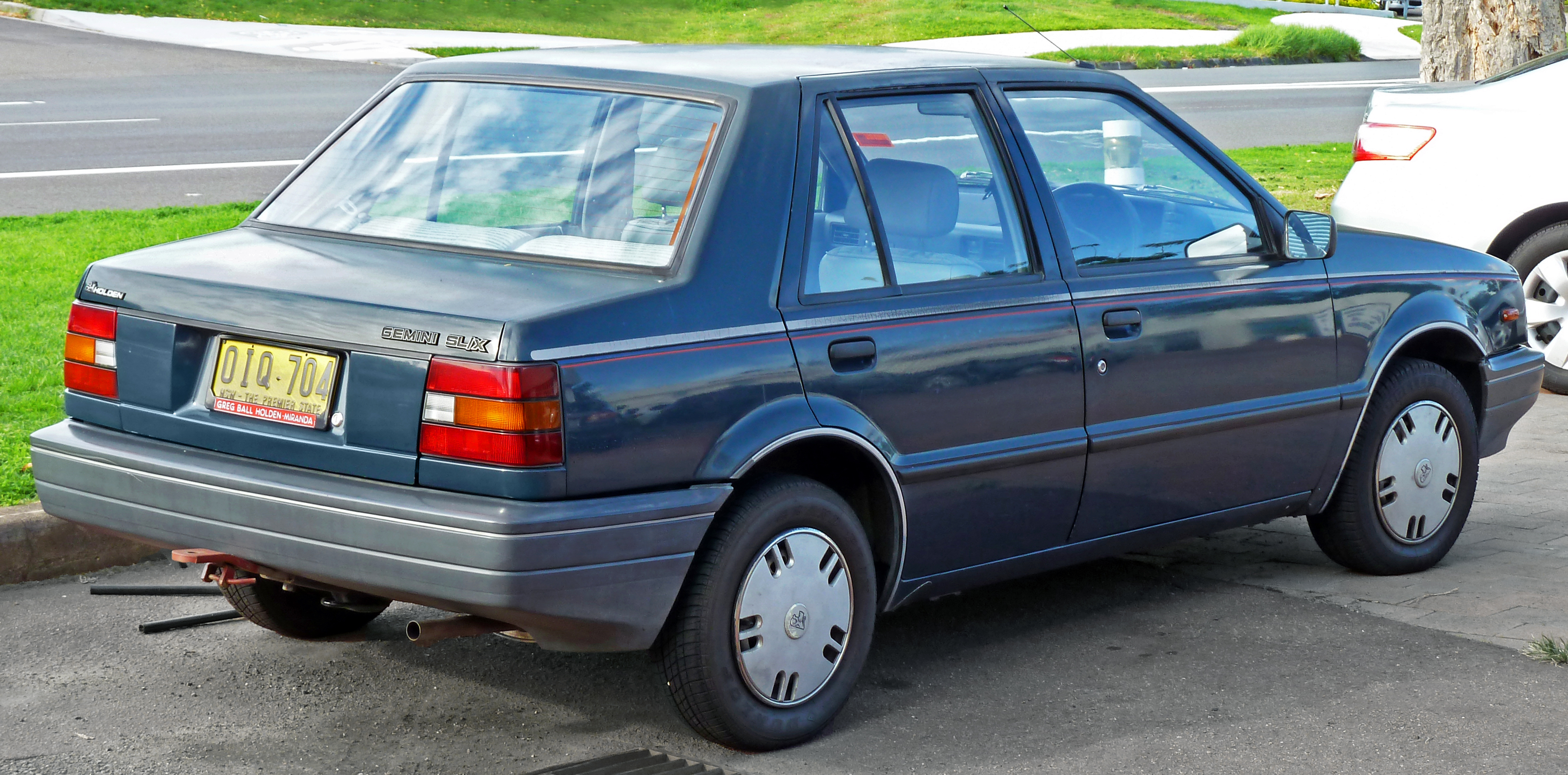
1985–1987 Holden Gemini (RB) SL/X

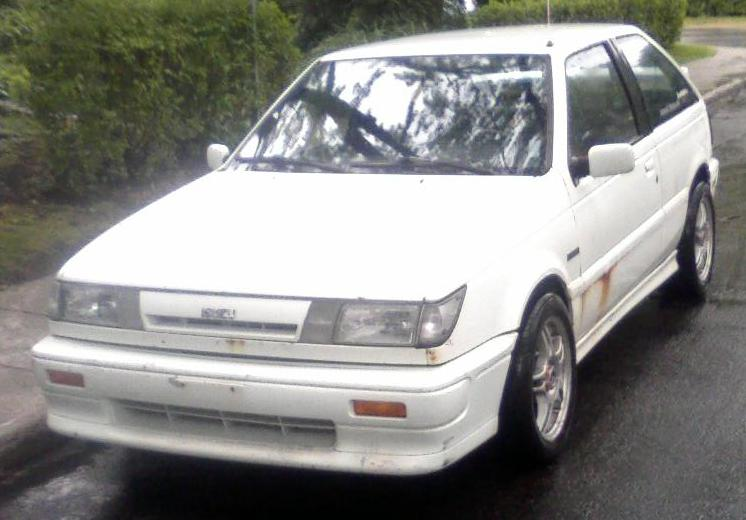
1988–89 Isuzu I-Mark hatchback coupe (North America)

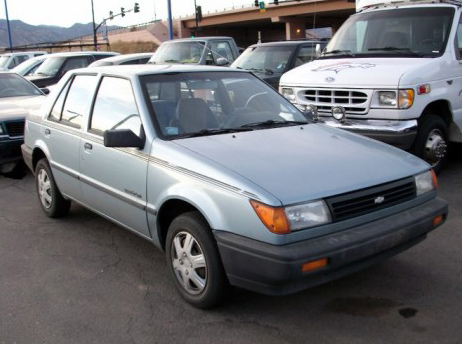
1989 Chevrolet/Geo Spectrum

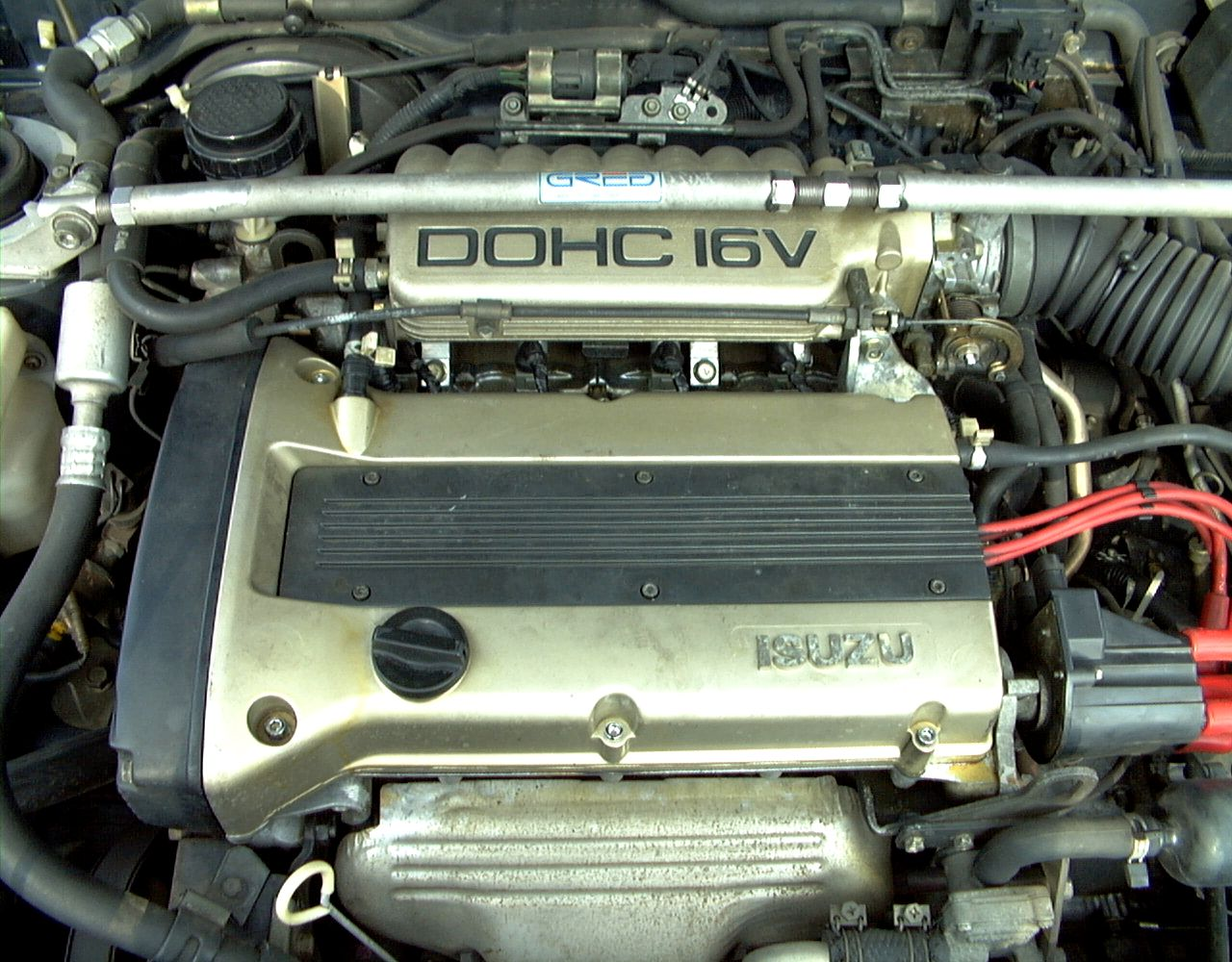
Isuzu 4XE1 1.6L Engine (JT190)

General Motors sought a replacement for their world car T-body Kadett / Gemini, and this time, instead of building one design on several continents, they decided to build a world car in one location and export it to several continents. As a considerable portion of the T-body manufacturing had been turned over to Isuzu in Japan for economic reasons, so would the manufacturing of the replacement. In 1984, Isuzu again commissioned Giorgetto Giugiaro who was responsible for the 117 Coupé and the Piazza. This time, he was to design an economy car on the new front-wheel drive R-body platform. The R-body featured a MacPherson strut front suspension and beam axle rear suspension, which foreshadowed most of GM's offerings through their current model lineup. Giugiaro's design followed the Piazza design very closely in shape and detail, though the proportions made the Gemini appear shorter and taller in its three-door version, and a four-door sedan (notch back) was also designed.

Unfortunately for everyone involved, Isuzu presented the designs to GM prior to freezing them, and GM ordered a number of detail changes to them without ever consulting the designer, Giugiaro, which was taken as an insult, and ended the long relationship between the noted Italian designer and Japan's second oldest car builder. The insult was serious enough to Giugiaro that he denied the design was his until a decade after the vehicle went out of production.

The R-body Gemini was introduced in May 1985 as the Gemini FF (after it had already gone on sale as a Chevrolet in the United States), with an all-new line of engines. In Japan, originally with chassis code JT150, it was available with a carburetted 1.5-liter SOHC engine. An also newly developed 1.5-liter inline four diesel engine (JT600) was added to the lineup in November. At the other end of the lineup, a 120 PS (88 kW) fuel-injected and turbocharged version of the 1.5-liter 4XC1 engine ("Irmscher") was added in May 1986. Originally, the transmission started out with a choice of a 5-speed manual or a 3-speed automatic, but NAVi5, an automated manual transmission, was added in 1986.

The FF Gemini underwent a facelift in February 1987, receiving a more aggressive front styling with wraparound headlight as well as other minor changes. At the same time, the "FF" moniker was dropped, as parallel production of the preceding RWD Gemini came to an end. In March 1987 the Gemini saw its European premiere, at the Geneva Motor Show. European sales of the already somewhat dated Gemini were disappointing, and Isuzu soon withdrew from the European passenger car market entirely.

A 1.6-liter DOHC engine with 135 PS (99 kW) was introduced in February 1988. Export versions were also available with a smaller 1.3-liter four to suit taxation systems based on displacement. This offered 72 PS (53 kW), while export specification 1.5s had 76 PS (56 kW) on tap and the naturally aspirated diesel offered 52 PS (38 kW) outside Japan. Trim levels were widely varied, from basic models ("C/C" in Japan, "LT" in general export markets, and "S" in the US) to Irmscher, ZZ, and Lotus Tuned versions, and plenty of optional equipment and dealer options were available.

A second minor change was released in February 1989 for Japan only. The position of the rear license plate garnish for the sedan model has been moved from the trunk lid to the center part of the bumper. Other differences include the amber turn indicators lens now having been dropped, and an addition of side marker lights. In total, 748,216 second generation Geminis (under all nameplates) were built. 150,873 of these were sold as Isuzu I-Marks in the United States, while 363,171 were sold under the Chevrolet and Geo badges.

=== North America ===
In the US, the vehicle was available from Chevrolet (and as a Geo beginning in mid-1988) as the Spectrum, or from Isuzu themselves, as the I-Mark. GM's Pontiac division sold the I-Mark as the Pontiac Sunburst in Canada from 1985 to 1988. Sales were limited to coastal markets initially, as import quotas restricted the number of cars General Motors could sell in the United States. The Spectrum was presented at the end of November 1984, with cars initially going on sale in 16 eastern states. Isuzu's own I-Mark went on sale during the 1985 model year. Due to the quotas, only 29,500 cars were available the first model year, about a quarter of what GM had hoped to be able to sell.

The introductory model years featured a unique eggcrate grille flanked by single square sealed-beam headlights, but for 1987 the Spectrum (and I-Mark) received the restyled front end with "cat's eyes" headlights and 5-mph bumpers. The interior was also revamped, and the 105 hp (78 kW) Spectrum Turbo was added to the lineup. Isuzu's turbocharged version, dubbed RS, was a later introduction, arriving early in calendar year 1987. The Spectrum Turbo was only available as a four-door sedan, while the I-Mark RS was only available as a hatchback.

US sales of the Isuzu I-Mark were down by half for the latter half of 1989, as a lengthy changeover to the new models slowed down production in Japan. Isuzu was contractually obliged to supply a certain number of Geo Spectrums, meaning that there were very few I-Marks available for Isuzu's own dealers. With a delayed introduction of the upcoming Stylus (third generation Gemini), Isuzu largely abandoned the passenger car segment for nearly a year, selling mostly leftover stock of the old Impulse.

GM Canada replaced the Sunburst with the Passport Optima for 1988. For GM, this was an entry-level vehicle to attract young buyers and to compete with Japanese midsize cars in the US market. Chevrolet's Spectrum lacked many of the options and equipment of the I-Mark, although with the exception of a brief run of decontented hatchbacks in 1988 dubbed "Spectrum Express" they were not as austere as the base trim levels of contemporary Dodge Colt, Toyota Tercel and Honda Civics. Both the Chevrolet and the Isuzu were available with the 70 hp (52 kW) 1.5-liter SOHC non-turbo and 110 hp (82 kW) turbo engines, but neither diesel engines nor NAVi5 were offered in the US. The turbocharged I-Mark was called the RS model in 1988 and then changed to the LS model in 1989. The I-Mark was available with the 125 hp (93 kW) 1.6-liter DOHC engine in 1989 only, as the RS model. In 1988 and 1989, the LS and RS models were offered with Lotus Tuned Suspension, the sportier suspension featuring more rigid dampers, alternate spring rates, and bigger sway bars.

For 1988, the Chevrolet Spectrum was available as the base model, with a better equipped LS package, or as the Turbo Sedan. There was also a Spectrum Sport Coupe package (hatchback only) on offer, using the standard engine combined with some of the Turbo's equipment, such as a sporty steering wheel, different rear view mirrors, a rear spoiler, fully body colored exterior (grille, bumpers, door handles, etcetera), and the uprated F41 suspension. The 1989 Geo Spectrum (introduced in June 1988 as an early 1989 model year) was only available with the naturally aspirated 1.5-liter engine in a single equipment level, with either the three-door hatchback or four-door sedan bodywork.

Sold as:

- 1985–1989 Isuzu I-Mark – United States, Canada
- 1985–1990 Isuzu Gemini – Japan, Europe, Central America and Middle East
- 1985–1988 Chevrolet Spectrum – United States & Canada
- 1989 Geo Spectrum – United States
- 1985–1988 Pontiac Sunburst – Canada and Middle East
- 1985–1990 Holden Gemini – Australia, New Zealand and Indonesia
- 1985–1990 Chevrolet Gemini – Ecuador, Chile and Argentina

== Third generation (1990) ==
Third generation
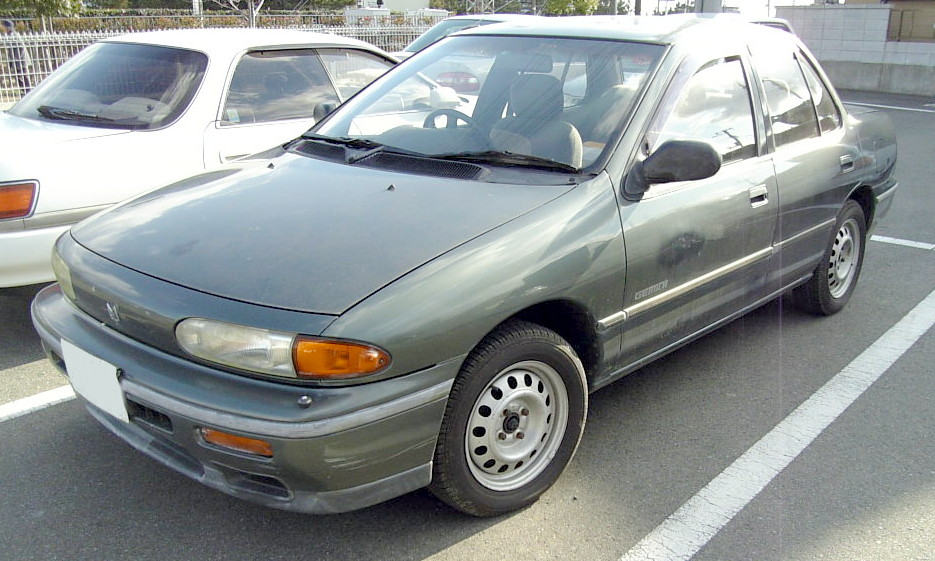

Overview
- Also called: Isuzu Stylus
- Production: 1990–1993
- Model years: 1991–1993 (United States)

Body and chassis
- Body style: 2-door coupe; 3-door hatchback; 4-door sedan
- Layout: Front engine, front-wheel drive / four-wheel drive
- Platform: R-body
- Related: Geo Storm; Isuzu Impulse; Asüna Sunfire

Powertrain
- Engine: petrol: 1.5 L 4XC1 SOHC I4 (JT151); 1.6 L 4XE1 SOHC/DOHC I4 (JT191); 1.6 L 4XE1-T turbo DOHC I4 (JT191); 1.8 L 4XF1 DOHC I4; diesel: 1.7 L 4EE1-T SOHC turbo I4 (JT641)
- Transmission: 3-speed automatic; 5-speed manual

Dimensions
- Wheelbase: 2,450 mm (96.5 in)
- Length: 4,185–4,195 mm (164.8–165.2 in)
- Width: 1,680 mm (66.1 in) (Sedan); 1,695 mm (66.7 in) (Coupé/Hatch)
- Height: 1,325–1,390 mm (52.2–54.7 in)

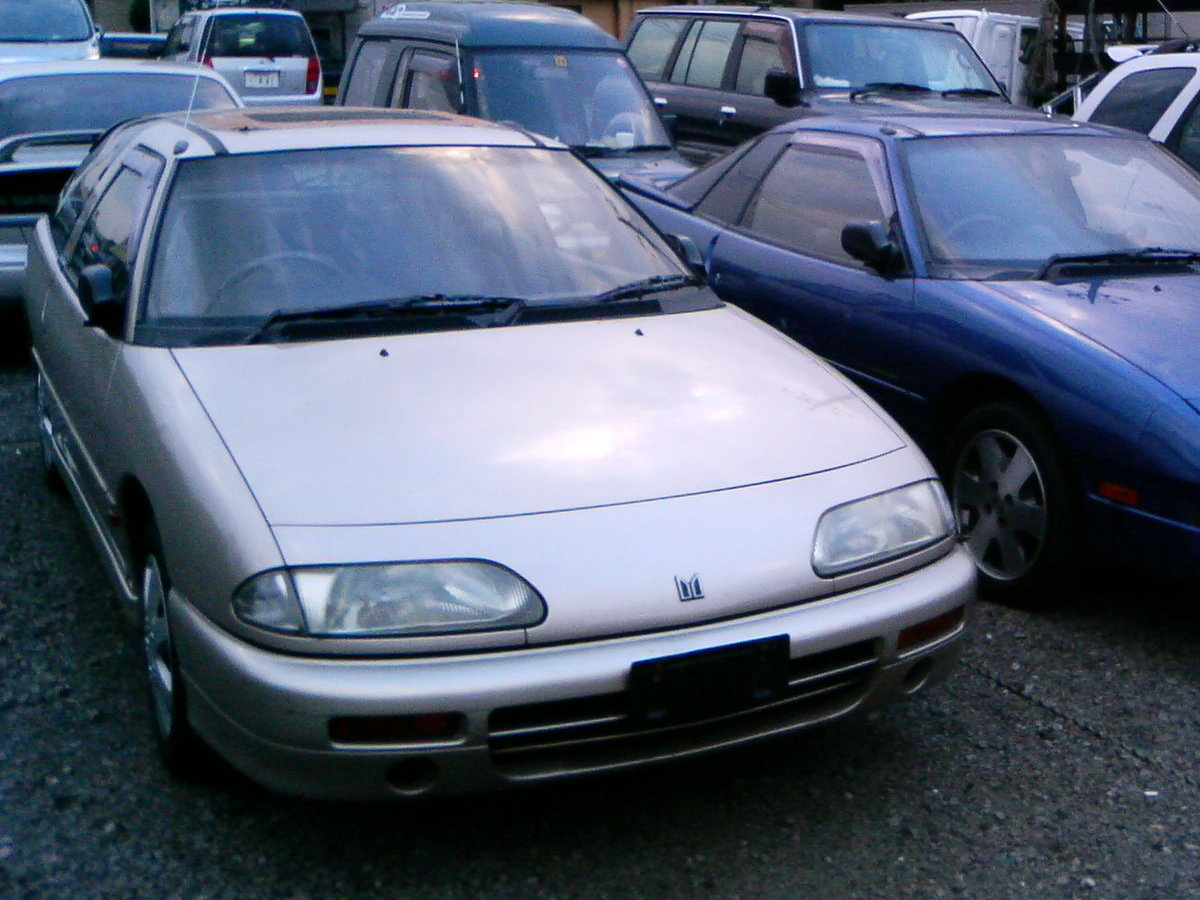
1991–1993 Isuzu Gemini Hatchback

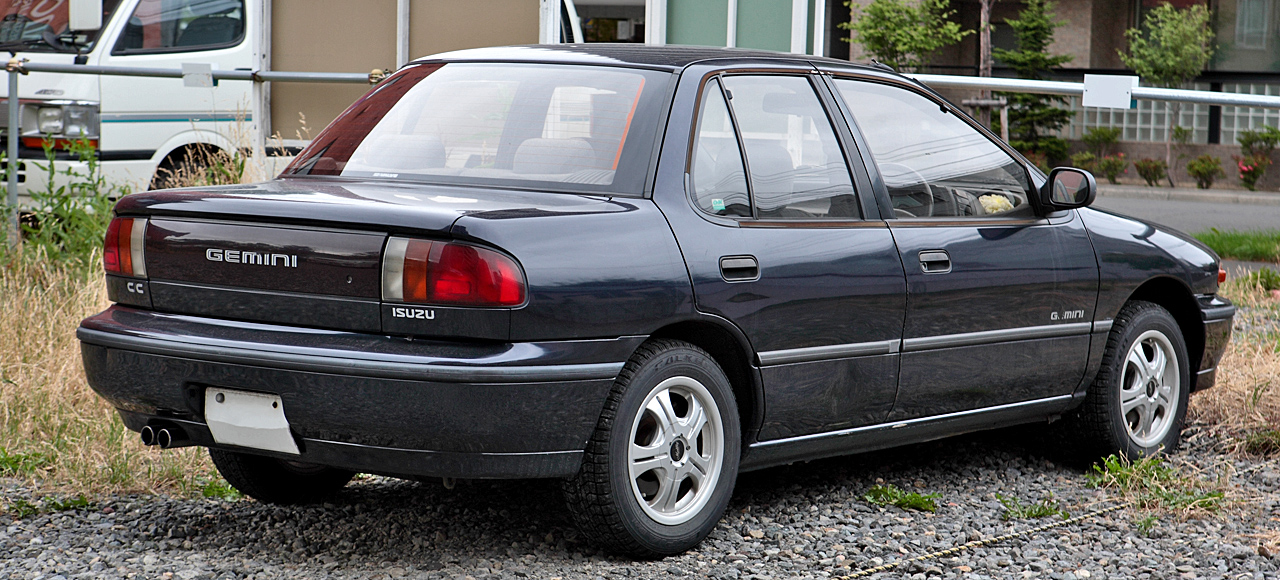
1991–1993 Isuzu Gemini sedan

The Gemini was redesigned for 1990, and the coupé version was now renamed the Gemini Coupé. Isuzu's financial woes had forced them to delay introducing the new model by a year, although the company would still realistically not be able to recoup their investment. The third generation sedan appeared in March 1990. Body size was wider than the previous generation. A liftback coupé was introduced in September 1990, with the three-door hatchback version added in March 1991. The last of the Isuzu-developed Geminis and its derivatives were sold as the Isuzu Impulse, Isuzu Piazza, Isuzu Gemini, Isuzu Stylus, Geo Storm, and Asüna Sunfire. The last models were produced in June 1993.

The Isuzu Gemini Coupé was the basis for the Isuzu Impulse and Geo Storm in the United States and Canada, and for the Asüna Sunfire which was sold in the Canadian market for the 1993 model year only. The Geo versions lacked some of the more expensive and advanced features of the Isuzu (and Asüna) versions. The four-door sedan was sold as the Isuzu Stylus in the United States and Canada.

Model codes were JT151F for the front-wheel drive 1.5/1.6-litre gasoline versions, JT191F for the front-wheel drive 1600 DOHC model, and JT191S for the four-wheel drive, turbocharged "Irmscher R" version. Turbodiesels are JT641F/JT641S for front-wheel drive and four-wheel drive models respectively.

The higher trim level packages offered "ZZ handling by Lotus" and "specification Irmscher" as the performance models in the lineup, equipment levels carried over from previous generations. The top model was the "Irmscher-R" JT191S type, equipped with a high-power turbocharged engine and full-time 4WD. The suspension packages that were installed on the second generation Isuzu Piazza were also available on the Gemini sold in Japan, including the four-wheel steering setup.

Initial orders were above target in Japan, but production lagged behind. Strong early sales began to slump within a year, however, and as the post-bubble recession began to take hold in Japan, Isuzu was particularly affected. After a corporate restructuring, Isuzu decided to abandon passenger car production and focus on commercial truck and SUV production, as the Trooper and the Rodeo found many buyers internationally, with badge engineered versions sold under a variety of brands and names across different markets.

=== North America ===
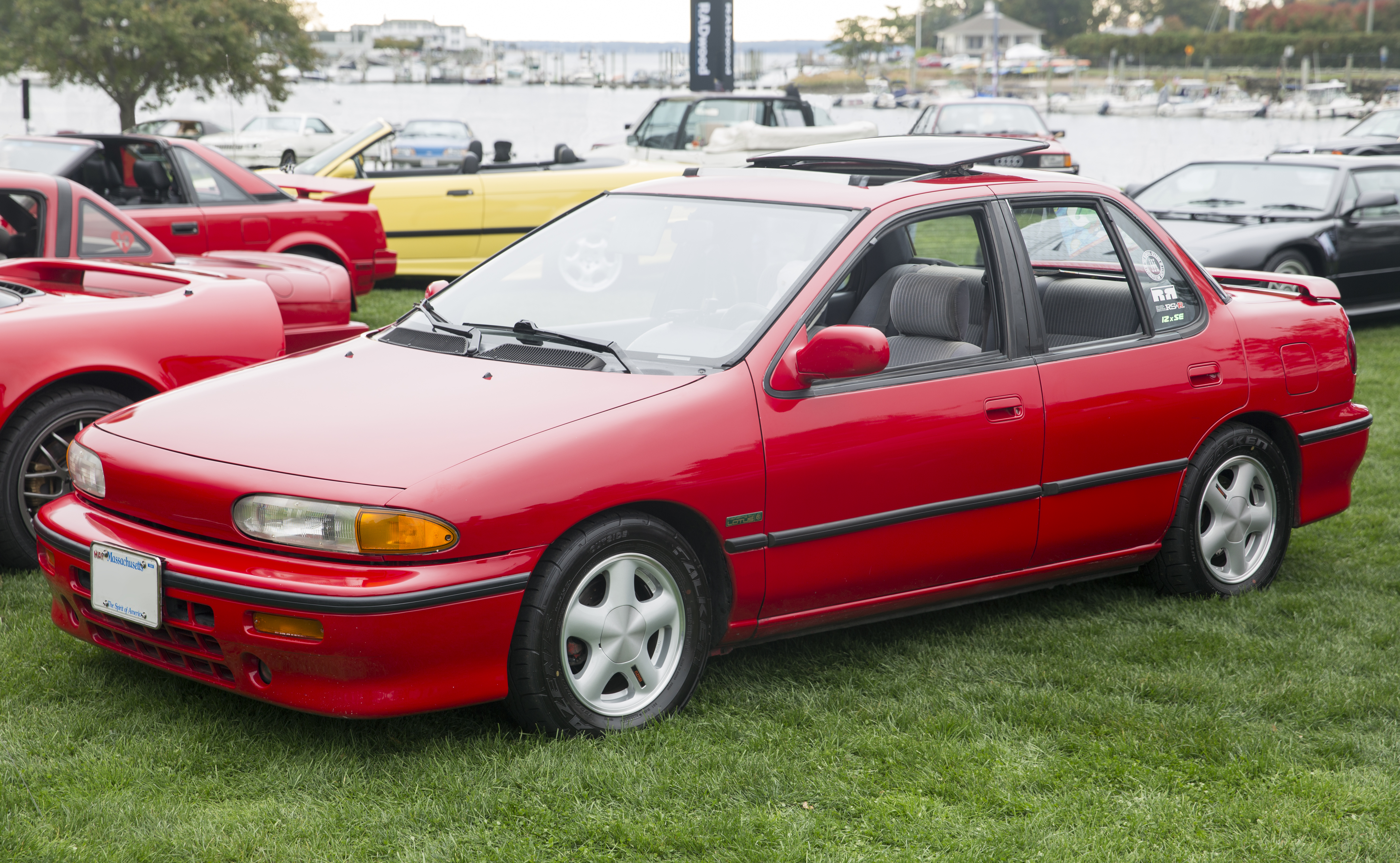
1991 Isuzu Stylus XS Power Package (US)

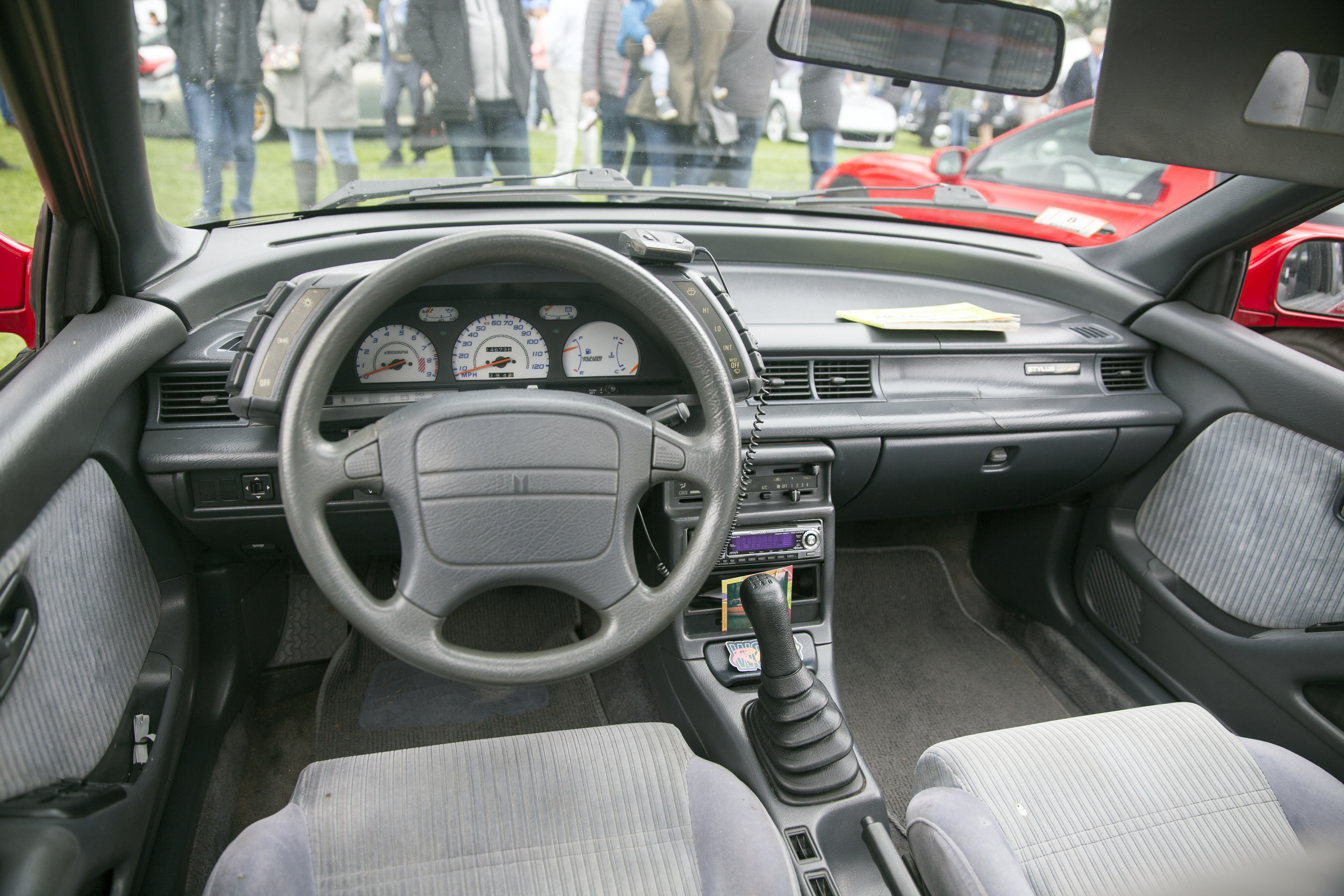
Interior

North American sales of the sedan started in December 1990 for the 1991 model year, under the name Isuzu Stylus. For 1991, there were two trim levels, the base Stylus "S" which received a 95 hp (71 kW) 1.6 L SOHC version of the 4XE1, available in 5-speed manual or 3-speed automatic transmissions, and the top-line Stylus "XS" model which had a 125 hp (93 kW) 4XE1-UW 1.6 L naturally aspirated DOHC engine, Lotus-tuned suspension, and was only available with a 5-speed manual transmission. The XS also offered an optional power equipment package, which included power windows, power door locks, power mirrors, and a sunroof. 1991 was the only year the Stylus was available in Canada, where it was sold through the Passport dealership network. All US-market Stylus models featured a driver's airbag, which was not available on Canadian models.

For 1992, the "S" trim was carried over mostly unchanged. The 1992 XS trim received the 4XF1 140 hp (104 kW) 1.8 L naturally aspirated DOHC engine with the 5-speed manual. The XS "Power Package" would evolve into the 1.8 L "RS" trim level for 1992, slotting above the "XS" trim.

The DOHC Stylus (both "XS" and "RS") would be dropped after 1992, leaving the lone SOHC "S" trim for the final 1993 model year to stand alongside the Geo Storm platform triplet. The third platform triplet, the Impulse, would also be withdrawn after 1992 and was sold in Canada for 1993 only as the Asüna Sunfire, as Isuzu was preparing its passenger car exit from the US market in July 1993.

The total production volume of vehicles was 406,625 units at the end of the third generation (from HQ Isuzu), with 17,754 units sold in the United States (from Ward's Automotive Yearbook).

== Fourth generation (1993) ==
Fourth generation
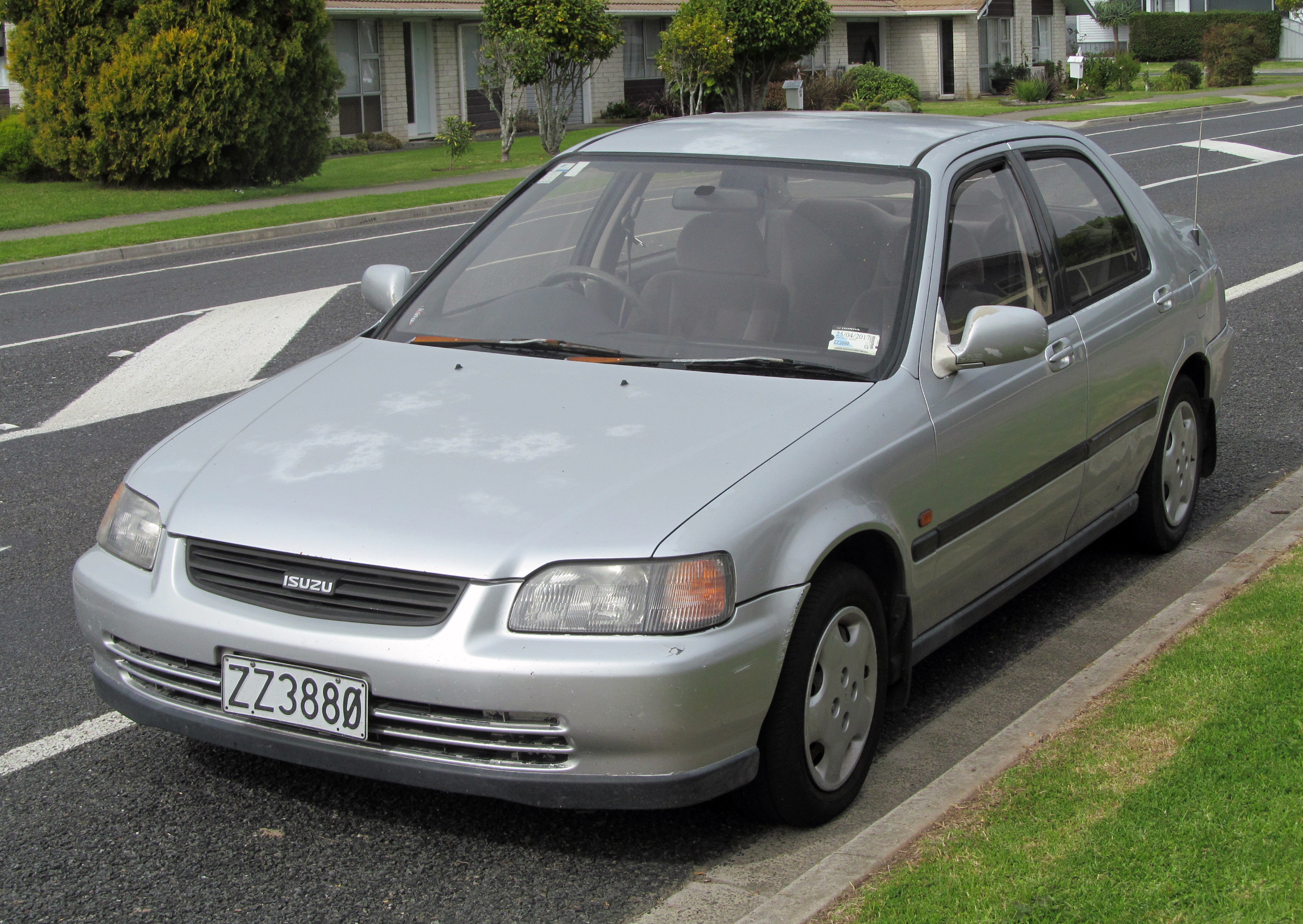

Overview
- Production: 1993–1997

Body and chassis
- Body style: 4-door sedan
- Layout: FF layout
- Related: Honda Civic; Honda Domani; Honda Integra SJ; Rover 400

Powertrain
- Engine: 1.5 L D15B VTEC-E I4 (MJ3); 1.6 L ZC I4 (MJ1/2)

Dimensions
- Wheelbase: 2,620 mm (103.1 in)

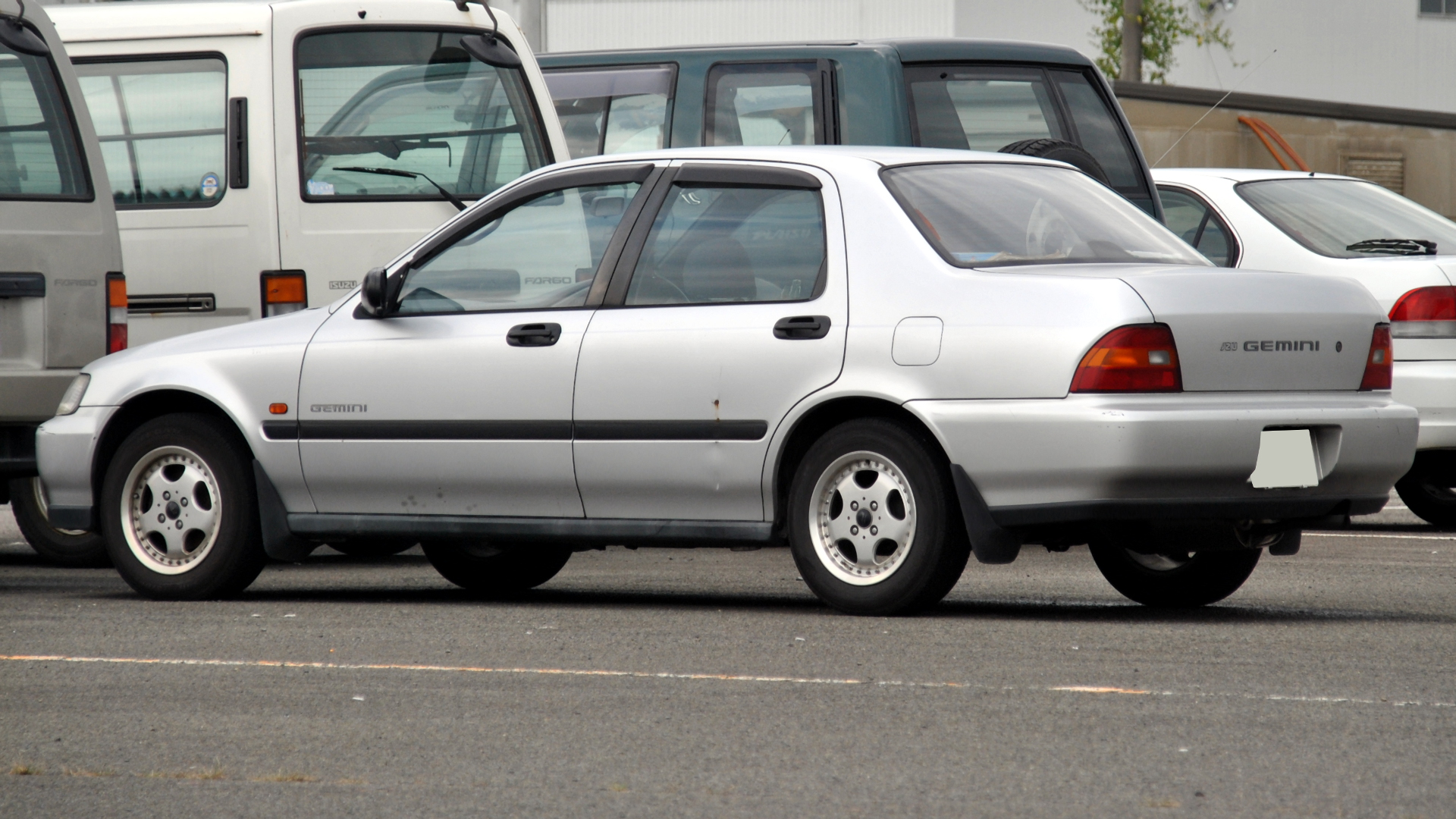
Isuzu Gemini rear

In 1993, Isuzu halted production of the Gemini and replaced it with a rebadged version of the Honda Domani. Announced at the end of August it went on sale in early September 1993. Isuzu did not really advertise the new Gemini; it was mainly produced to be sold to existing customers of Isuzu's commercial vehicles. It was only available with the four-door sedan bodystyle and a limited number of engines; the Domani also came as a five-door hatchback.

The models at the time of introduction were the 1600 C/C, C/C 4WD, and the slightly more powerful and better equipped G/G model. Maximum power output is 120 PS (88 kW) at 6,300 rpm for the C/C and 120 PS (88 kW) at 6,400 rpm for the G/G. In May 1995 the E-VTEC equipped 1500 C/C model was added to the lineup; this fuel efficient, lean-burn model was aimed at capturing some of the old buyers of diesel-engined Geminis. Diesels had accounted for about half of Gemini sales for the previous generations. The 1500 C/C has a maximum power of 94 PS (69 kW) at 5,500 rpm. In October 1995, the Gemini underwent some very minor changes in equipment and the 1600 C/C engine was lightly modified. Most notably, the "Gemini" sticker on the front doors was changed to a plastic emblem. Production of the fourth-generation Gemini ended in January 1997 and it was replaced the following month.

== Fifth generation (1997) ==
Fifth generation
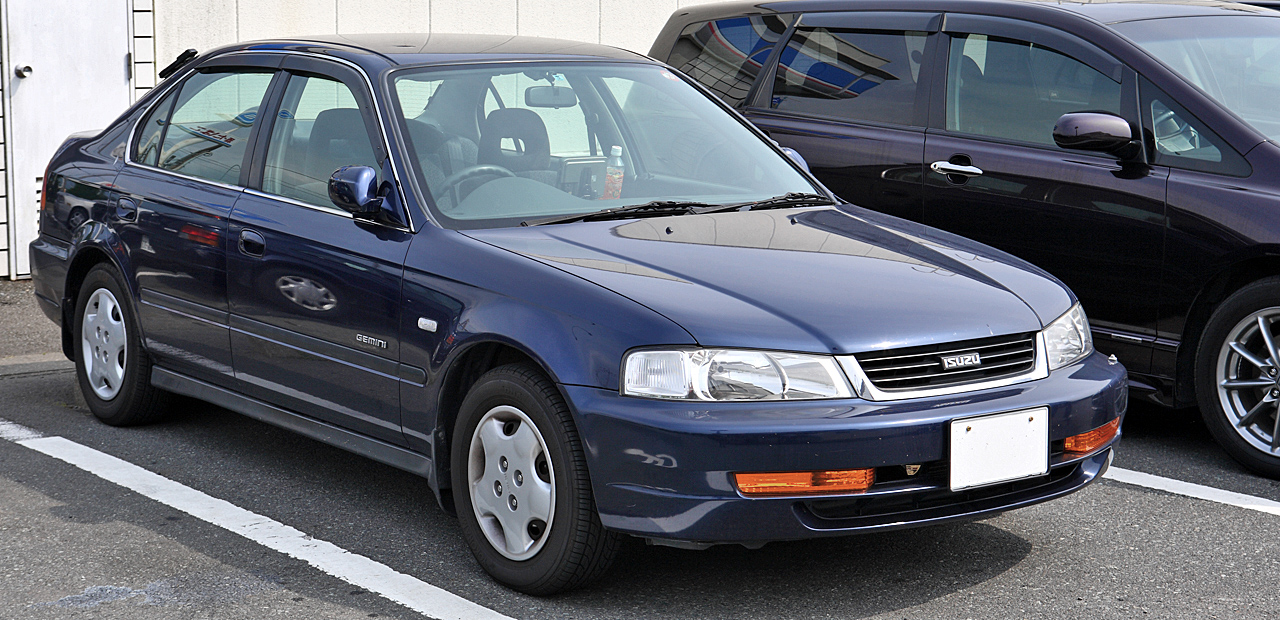

Overview
- Also called: Honda Domani; Acura EL
- Production: 1997–2000

Body and chassis
- Body style: 4-door sedan
- Layout: FF layout
- Related: Honda Civic; Rover 400

Dimensions
- Wheelbase: 2,620 mm (103.1 in)

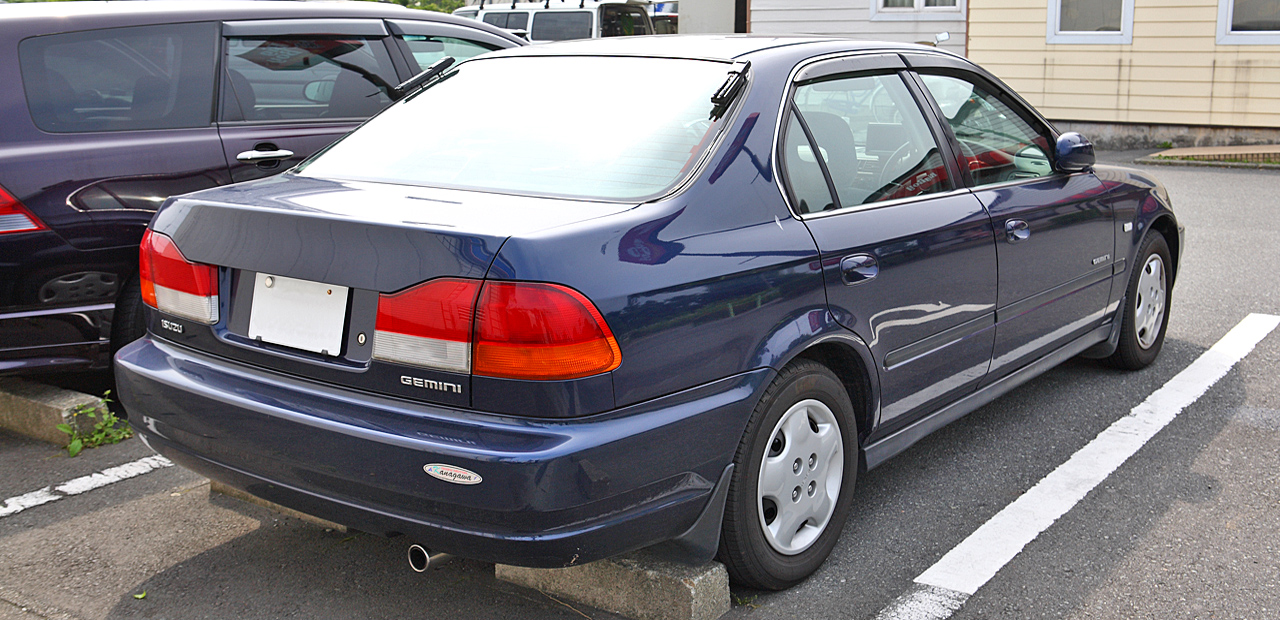
Isuzu Gemini rear

The fifth generation Gemini was a rebadged second generation Honda Domani sedan, a car which was also marketed as a Civic in Europe. Production of this model ceased in 2000. As usual, the Gemini was available in a much more limited lineup than that of the related Honda version, with only one bodystyle (four-door sedan) and either a 1.5- or a 1.6-litre engine.

== Safety ==
In Australia, the 1982–1984 Holden Gemini was assessed in the Used Car Safety Ratings 2006 as providing "significantly worse than average" protection for its occupants in the event of a crash. The second generation Gemini (RB) rated better, at "worse than average".

== Related information ==
The first and second generation Isuzu Geminis, specifically the diesel ones, were the most popular taxicab models in the Philippines in the 1980s and early 1990s. Models were phased out and gradually replaced with newer models from Toyota and Nissan.

The Singapore Police Force used the Isuzu Gemini Fast Response Cars (FRCs) from 1991 until 1995 until they were phased out and replaced by the Subaru Impreza police cars.

The front-wheel drive Geminis (second and third generation) were marketed in Japan with the catch phrase "Shortstop of the streets" (街の遊撃手, Machi no yūgekishu), and television commercials featuring exciting driving stunts throughout the streets of Paris. With French professional stunt driver Rèmy Julienne mostly coordinating with all of the stunts, the Geminis enjoyed wide popularity.
