= Geo Storm =

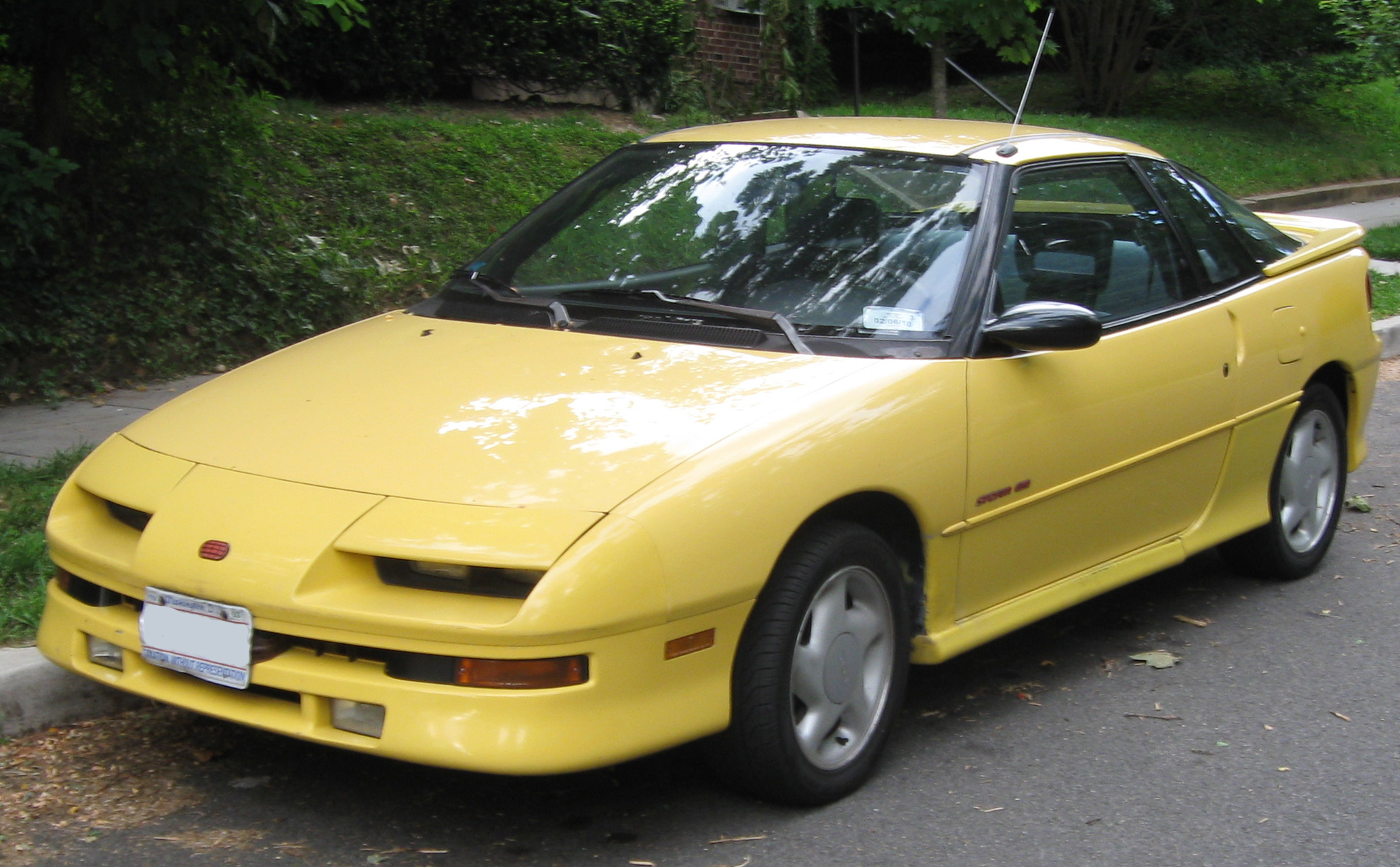

Overview
- Manufacturer: Isuzu
- Also called: Isuzu Gemini Coupé; Isuzu PA Nero (Japan; Yanase)
- Production: 1990–1993
- Model years: 1990–1993
- Assembly: Japan: Fujisawa Plant, Fujisawa, Kanagawa

Body and chassis
- Class: Sport compact
- Body style: 3-door hatchback 3-door liftback
- Layout: FF layout
- Platform: GM R platform
- Related: Isuzu Gemini; Isuzu Piazza; Isuzu Impulse; Asüna Sunfire

Powertrain
- Engine: 1.6 L SOHC 4XE1 I4; 1.6 L DOHC 4XE1 I4; 1.8 L DOHC 4XF1 I4
- Transmission: 5-speed manual; 3-speed Mazda F3A automatic; 4-speed Jatco F403E automatic

Dimensions
- Wheelbase: 96.5 in (2,451 mm)
- Length: 1990–91 base: 163.4 in (4,150 mm); 1990–91 GSi: 163.9 in (4,163 mm); 1992–93: 164 in 164 in (4,166 mm)
- Width: 66.7 in (1,694 mm)
- Height: 51.1 in (1,298 mm)
- Curb weight: 2,282 lb (1,035 kg)

Chronology
- Predecessor: Geo Spectrum
- Successor: none

The Geo Storm is a sport compact car manufactured by Isuzu that was sold in the United States by Geo from 1990 until 1993. The same vehicles, with minor variations, were sold by Geo in Canada in the 1992 and 1993 model years only. The Storm was intended to be a budget car with the look and feel of a sports car. It was sold in two-door liftback and hatchback forms.

The Geo Storm was a rebadged version of the sporty, second generation Isuzu Impulse minus some of that car's more expensive features. The base models were also equipped with a less-powerful SOHC engine. The Storm was sold in Japan as the Gemini Coupé and also as the PA Nero through the Yanase dealerships. The Storm lacked the Impulse's Lotus-tuned suspension as well as the Impulse's optional turbocharger and all-wheel drive drivetrain. Although they were essentially the same car, sales of the Storm were much stronger than those of the Impulse—indeed, the Storm sold better than most small GM cars of that era. Slow sales of the Isuzu version doomed the Storm. When Isuzu ceased building passenger cars in 1993 due to the effects of the crash of the Japanese Bubble Economy, the Isuzu-made Geo Storm was also discontinued with them. Geo offered no sport coupe replacement for the Storm before the brand was folded into Chevrolet after 1997. As of 2010, there were only 40,300 Storms registered for road use.

The Storm was manufactured at Isuzu's main plant in Fujisawa, Kanagawa, Japan.

== Versions ==
The most common body style for the Storm was a three-door liftback. The 1990 and 1991 liftbacks were produced in two trim packages, but all Storms shared front disc and rear drum brakes and had an anti-sway bar to tighten the front suspension. The base model was priced at $10,390, and the GSi was $11,650 .USD

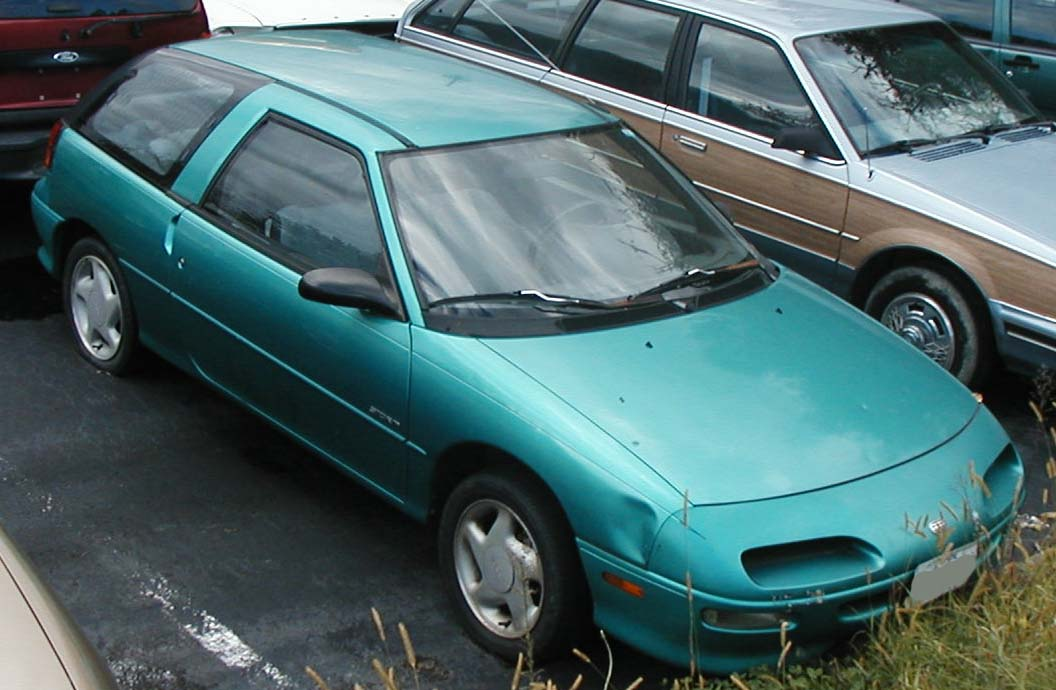
1992 Geo Storm hatchback

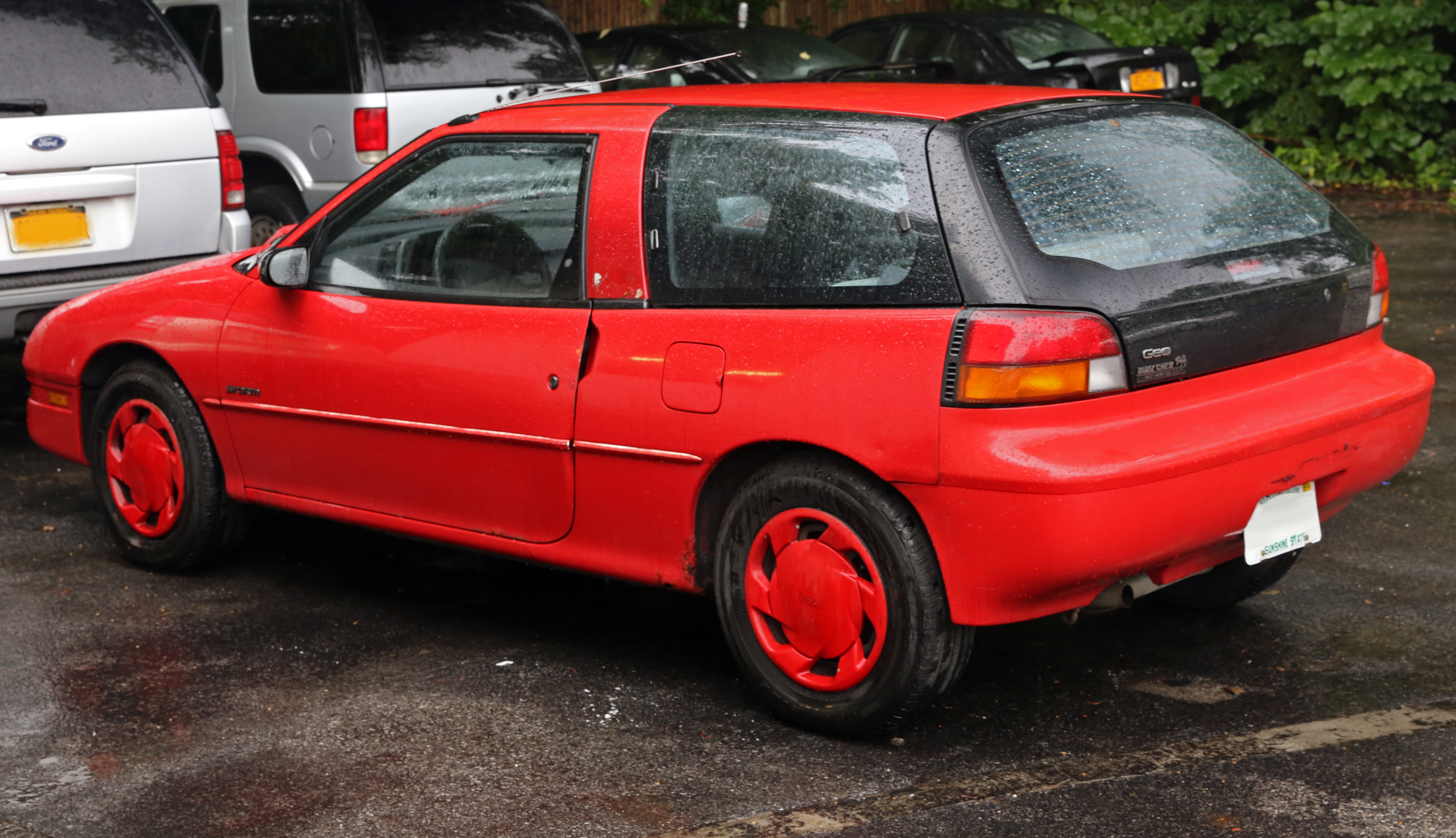
Rear view of a 1991 hatchback

The base model's SOHC inline-four engine produced 95 hp (71 kW) and had a 9.1:1 compression ratio. The more powerful 1990–1991 GSi used a 1.6L DOHC engine that produced 130 hp (97 kW) and had a 9.8:1 compression ratio. The GSi package also included driving lights, a spoiler, a rear anti-sway bar, and a transmission with a gear ratio that was slightly better for acceleration than the base model's manual transmission.

For 1991 and 1992, customers had the option of purchasing a two-door hatchback body style, also called a wagonback. The base price of the hatchback was $11,450, and it was never offered with the stronger GSi engine. The much more popular Storm liftback was marketed as a "coupé".

In 1992, the Storm was restyled to have a smoother front fascia without the pop-up headlight covers on earlier models. The 1992–93 base models retained the same engine, features, and price that were on the earlier car, with slight interior changes such as different stereos, revised rear speaker locations, and interior trim and upholstery. The GSi version from these years cost considerably more ($13,645–14,560) but this price included a larger 1.8 L 140 hp (104 kW) engine.

Canada received the Storm in 1992; it was offered there in base trim and in up-level GSi "Sport Coupe" models (both available as liftbacks). The more upright "Hatchback" model only came in base trim.

The Japanese were also offered the Geo Storm version of the Piazza, called the Yanase-Isuzu PA Nero, which was exclusive to Japanese dealerships called Yanase Co., Ltd. under special arrangement, a dealership that sold GM products in Japan. The Piazza/Impulse was also sold by General Motors Canada as the Asüna Sunfire.

== Performance ==
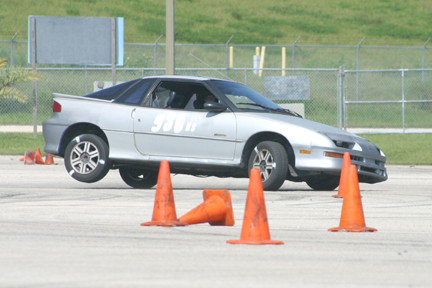
1990 Geo Storm GSi liftback in autocross

Modern sport compacts have faster acceleration and better handling, but the performance figures for the Storm were quite respectable for an economical compact car from that era. Autoweek's 1990 review of the Storm was titled "Slick, Quick And Inexpensive", and described the car as "a good performer" that "handles better than the average new car". When Road & Track compared ten sport compact cars they said the Storm had "the highest skidpad rating (0.85 g), sticks like pine tar to the autocross course, is second-quickest through the slalom and stops shorter from 80 mph (130 km/h) than many highly respected sports cars".

Skid pad test figures ranged from 0.81 g to 0.85 g, meeting or exceeding those of the Mazda RX-7 convertible. Sport Compact Car listed the Storm as number three in their "Top Ten of 1992". Hot Rod Magazine's Jeff Smith drove a Geo Storm that was set up for SCCA Super Production racing and declared it to be "every bit as demanding and fun" as racing a Trans-Am series car.

Two different Geo Storm Celebrity Races were held in 1991, the first on July 13 in Des Moines, Iowa, and the second on August 24 in Denver, Colorado. Although they are not the most common type of race cars, modified Storms are still occasionally used to compete in road racing, drag racing and autocross. One of the 2003 entries in the Grassroots Motorsports Challenge was a Storm GSi.

Model	0-60 mph (0-97 km/h)	Top speed
1990 GSi	8.0 seconds	130 mph (210 km/h)
1991 Wagonback	10.0 seconds	108 mph (174 km/h)
1992 GSi	7.1 seconds	125 mph (201 km/h)

== Reviews ==
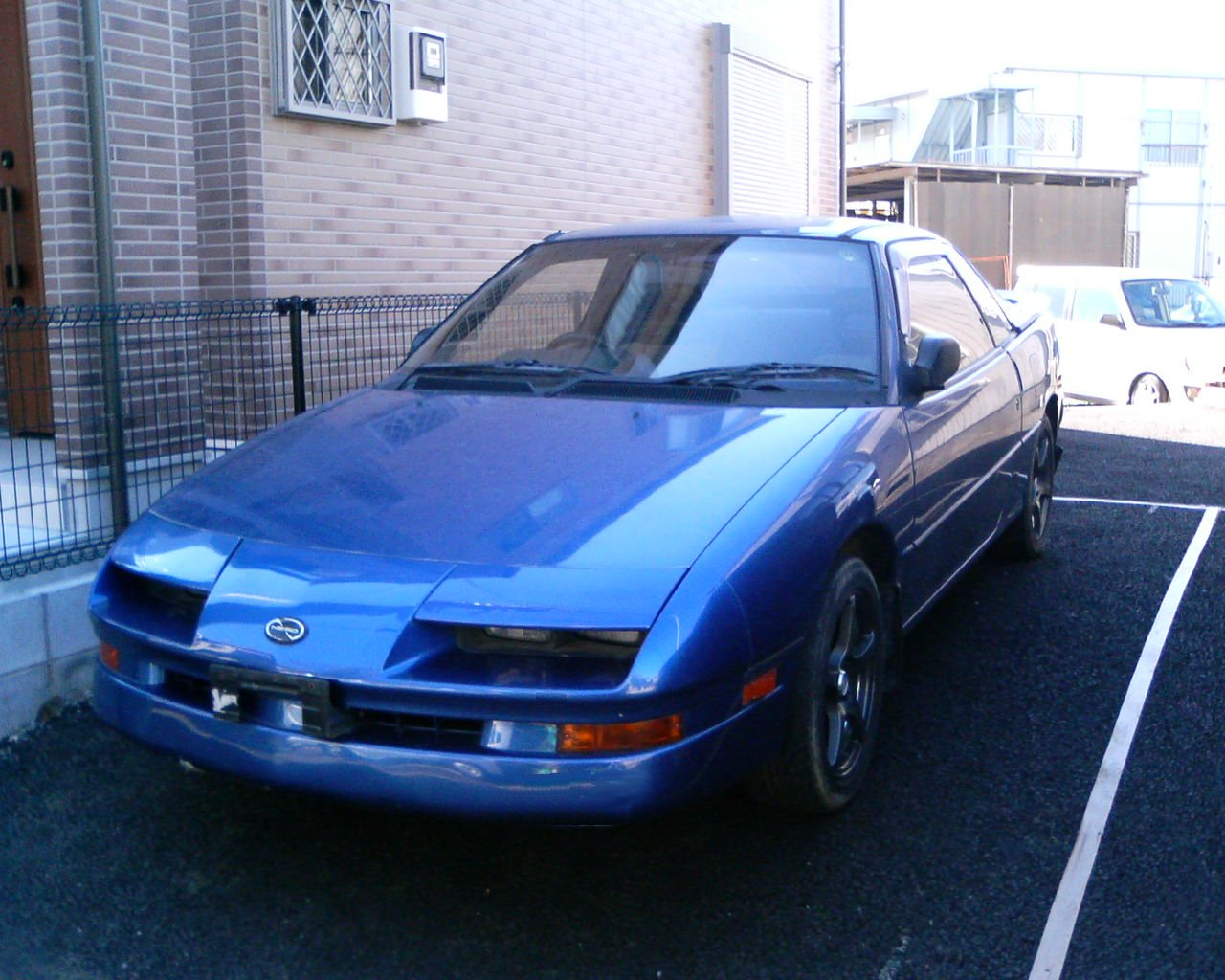
Isuzu PA Nero (Japan)

The Storm sold well and was popular with owners, despite getting mixed reviews from automotive magazines. The body styling was "mildly controversial". Kevin Smith of Car and Driver used phrases like "Planet Zarkon" and "space-capsulish" to describe the body, which he listed as one of the best and worst features of the Storm. AutoWeek said that college-aged people tended to "shower the Storm with attention", but that baby boomers tended to "think that at best, the Storm is unusual looking, at worst, odd".

The shape of the body was not the only thing automotive journalists criticized. The engine was described as a "buzzbomb" or "just plain noisy". A few reviewers disliked the suspension, saying the Storm has "above average body lean and needs more rebound control". Some complained about the small cargo area, visibility and the absence of headroom for backseat passengers.

Other aspects of the Storm were more popular with magazine test drivers. Many praised the wide power band of the engine. AutoWeek said, "It revs quickly and easily. Running up to the 7600 rpm redline can be a delight." Automobile Magazine liked the handling, saying, "It's a delight to negotiate twisty...roads with its firm yet compliant suspension."

== Year to year changes ==
- 1991: A hatchback ("wagonback") model was added, other than that, the Storm carried on unchanged.
- 1992: All three models of the Storm received a new headlight cluster (with narrow sealed-beam halogen headlamps also seen in that year's Pontiac Grand Prix GTP), tail lights, and front clip. The Storm went on sale in Canada. Base models received a new rear bumper treatment. Instrument panel and gauge graphics were also slightly revised. The GSi version received a new spoiler and a larger DOHC engine which offered 10 extra hp.
- 1993: The hatchback was dropped, and the center console was fitted with a double-DIN radio. The hp rating of the base model dropped from 95 to 90 because of a camshaft redesign to allow more torque, creating a peppier engine.

Overall, there were six versions of the Storm; the early 1990-91 base and GSi liftbacks, 1991 base hatchback, facelifted 1992-93 base and GSi liftbacks, and base 1992 hatchback.
