= General Motors R platform =

Former Japanese-American car platform

GM R platform
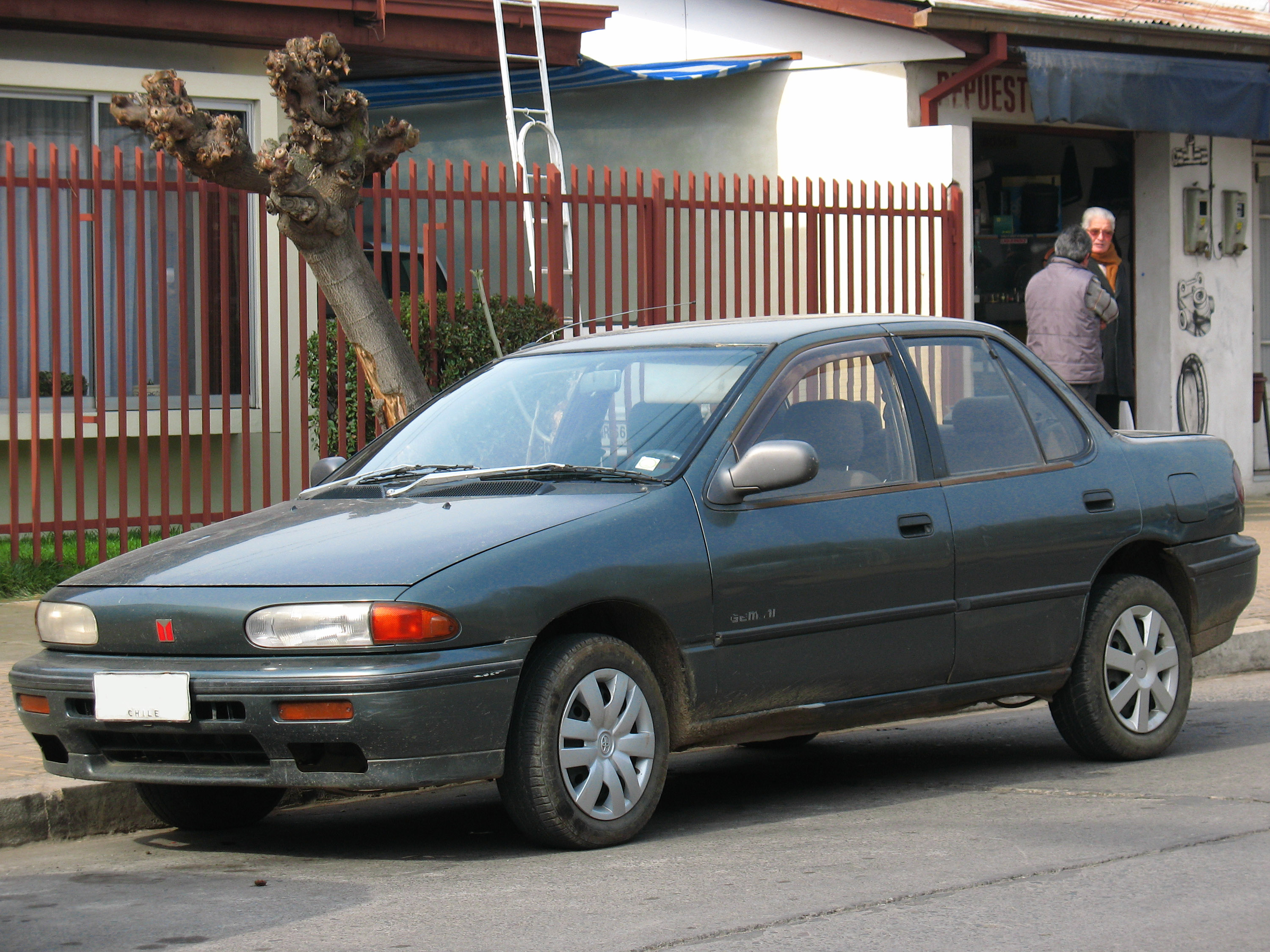
- Isuzu Gemini, an example of an R platform vehicle

Overview
- Production: 1985–1993

Body and chassis
- Layout: FF layout
- Body styles: 3-door hatchback coupe 4-door sedan

Dimensions
- Wheelbase: 2,400 mm (94.5 in)

The GM R platform is a platform manufactured by General Motors from 1985 through 1993.

== Vehicles ==
- 1985–1988 Chevrolet Spectrum
- 1985–1986 Holden Gemini
- 1985–1993 Isuzu Gemini
- 1985–1989 Isuzu I-Mark
- 1985–1990 Chevrolet Gemini
- 1985–1989 Pontiac Sunburst
- 1988–1989 Geo Spectrum
- 1990–1993 Isuzu Piazza
- 1990–1993 Isuzu Impulse
- 1990–1993 Asüna Sunfire
- 1990–1993 Isuzu Stylus
- 1990–1993 Geo Storm
- 1990–1993 Isuzu PA Nero
