= Geo (automobile) =

Defunct American motor vehicle brand

- Product type: Subcompact cars
- Current owner: General Motors
- Produced by: General Motors
- Country: United States
- Introduced: August 16, 1989
- Discontinued: June 16, 1997; 29 years ago
- Related brands: Asüna

Geo was a brand of small cars marketed by General Motors (GM) as a subdivision of its Chevrolet division from 1989 to 1997.

Geo was a joint venture between GM and Japanese automakers to compete with the growing small import market in the United States during the mid-1980s. Subcompact cars and SUVs, either badge engineered or based on Japanese models, were produced by GM at its facilities in North America or imported from Japan. Geo was discontinued after the 1997 model year and merged into Chevrolet. The Geo Metro, Prizm, and Tracker were sold as Chevrolets from the 1998 model year until their discontinuances in 2001, 2002, and 2004, respectively. In this sense, Geo existed until 2004, even with the Geo nameplate being dropped in mid-1997.

Asüna, a counterpart marque to Geo in Canada, was introduced by GM in 1992 to provide Pontiac-Buick-GMC dealers access to a similar range of import vehicles.

== Manufacturing ==
Geo models were manufactured by GM in joint ventures with three Japanese automakers: Toyota, Isuzu, and Suzuki. The Prizm was produced at the GM/Toyota joint-venture NUMMI assembly plant in Fremont, California in the United States, and the Metro and Tracker models were produced at the GM/Suzuki joint-venture CAMI assembly plant in Ingersoll, Ontario in Canada. The exceptions, the Spectrum and Storm, were entirely manufactured by Isuzu in Japan. Geo Metro convertibles and early Geo Trackers were built by Suzuki in Japan.

== Marketing ==
Geo's logo was based on the Chevrolet logo which was a globe outline with the Chevrolet bow tie in the middle, primarily seen on steering wheels of most Geo models. Its original slogan was "Get to know Geo" and commercials often featured the song "Getting to Know You" from the musical The King and I. The main selling point of all Geo models was being cheap and efficient, especially the Metro.

== Models ==
=== Metro ===
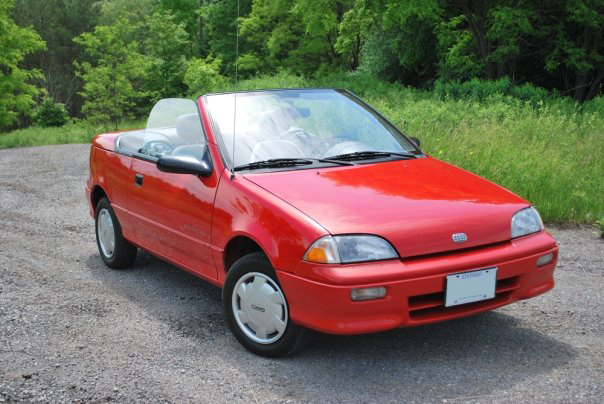
1992 Geo Metro convertible

The Geo Metro is a small economy car that was based on the Suzuki Swift (Cultus) produced from 1989 to 2001 model years. The first generation was offered in three and five-door hatchback models as well as a 4-door notchback sedan that was only sold in Canada. In 1990, a convertible was available but was phased out after 1993. The Metro came in three trim levels: XFi, base, or LSi. The XFi's engine has less horsepower than the base and LSi and achieved a gas mileage of 53 mpg (city) and 58 mpg (highway). All of the Metros at this time had three cylinder engines with a 5-speed manual or 3-speed automatic transmission. The convertible is also the only first-generation Metro to offer an airbag. In 1995, the Metro was redesigned with a more modern appearance and offered a 70 hp (52 kW; 71 PS) four-cylinder engine, standard dual airbags and optional anti-lock brakes. A four-door sedan replaced the five-door hatchback. The XFi did not return for 1995 and only the Base and LSi models were offered. The three-cylinder engine remained in the base hatchback. In 1998 the Metro, now branded as a Chevrolet, was revamped one last time. It was given minor restyling, improved headlamps, and improved four cylinder engine, now producing 79 hp (59 kW; 80 PS). The 2000 model year was the last for the Metro hatchback and the three cylinder engine. All 2001 models were four-door sedans that were sold to fleets only.

=== Prizm ===
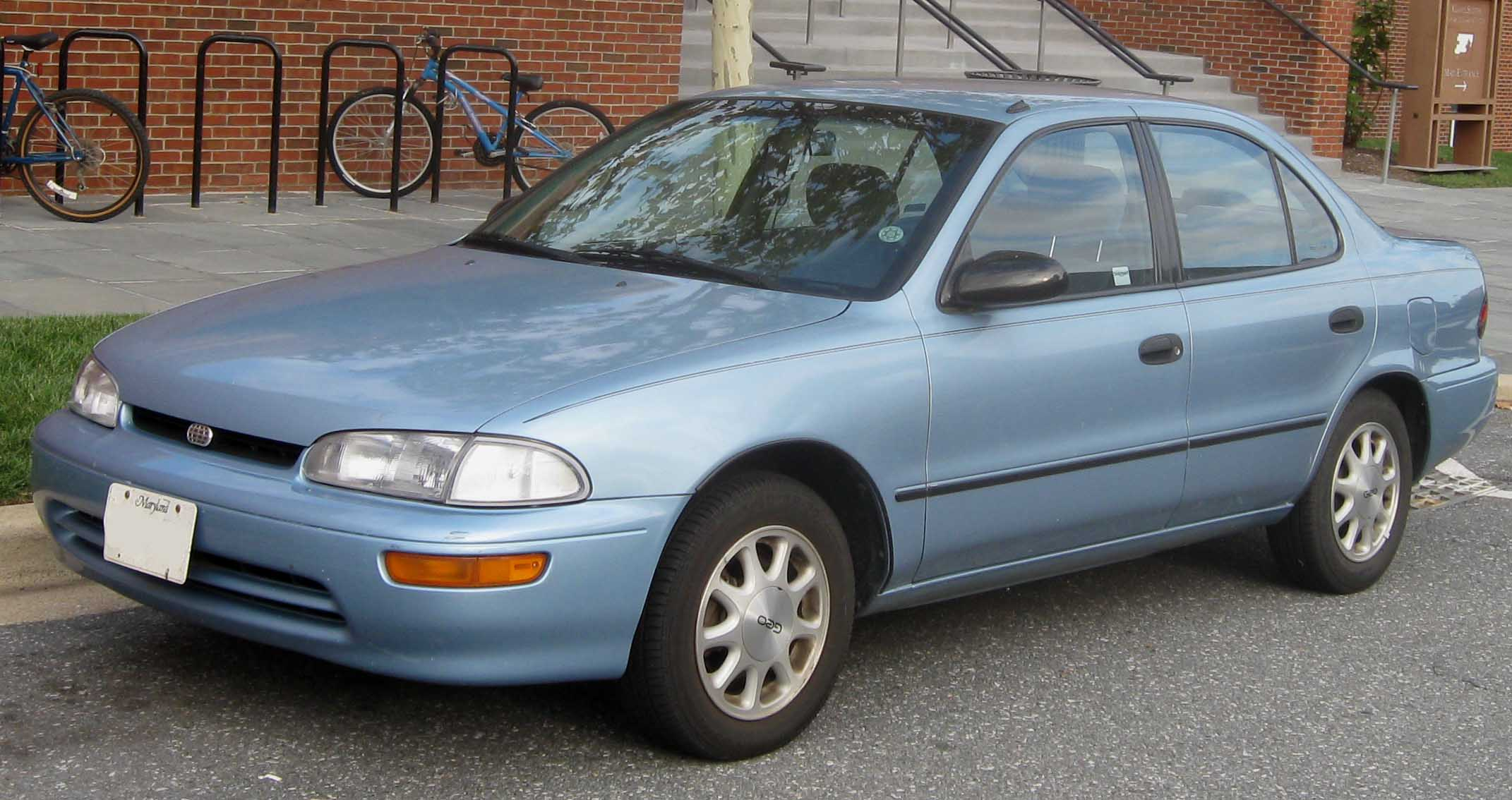
1993-1997 Geo Prizm

The Prizm is a compact four-door sedan that was based on the Toyota E90 and E100 platform Toyota Sprinter. It was the successor to the Chevrolet Nova. A five-door hatchback model was also offered through 1991. While the Prizm consistently won awards from the auto industry (including a Consumer's Digest Best Buy selection), it was always outsold by the platform twin Toyota Corolla. Additionally, the Prizm was positioned within Chevrolet's own model lineup and competed with the Cavalier for market share and dealer floor space. The Prizm was sold from 1989 through 2002 and produced at NUMMI in Fremont, California. The Prizm came in either a base model or a more upscale LSi version that had an optional 1.8 L engine and a 4-speed automatic transmission. Leather interior was also optional on the LSi model. From 1990 to 1992, the Prizm had a sporty GSi model with red and black badging. It was equivalent in power and equipment to the Corolla GT-S although the latter was a coupe. The GSi was the most powerful Prizm with 130 hp (97 kW; 132 PS). The Prizm model line was not offered in Canada.

=== Spectrum ===
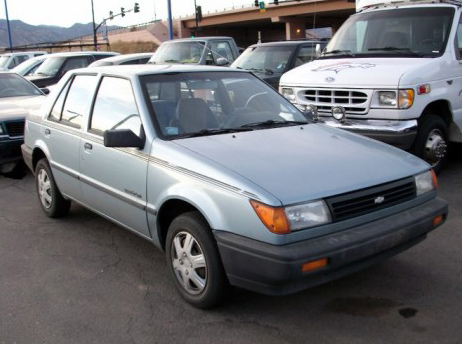
1989 Geo Spectrum

The Spectrum was a short-lived subcompact model based on the Isuzu Gemini and one size up from the Metro. The Spectrum was sold as a regular Chevrolet model from 1985 to 1988. The 85-86 models shared several subtle differences to their 87-89 counterparts and were still fully branded as Chevrolets for the first year of production in 1989. However, with the launch of the Geo marque in 1989, the Spectrum was rebranded as a Geo. Although the grille stayed the same (including the Chevrolet "bowtie" emblem without Geo "globe") the rear "Chevrolet" emblem was replaced with a "Geo" emblem. The Geo Spectrum was only sold in 1989 and was replaced by the Isuzu-produced Geo Storm hatchback.

=== Storm ===
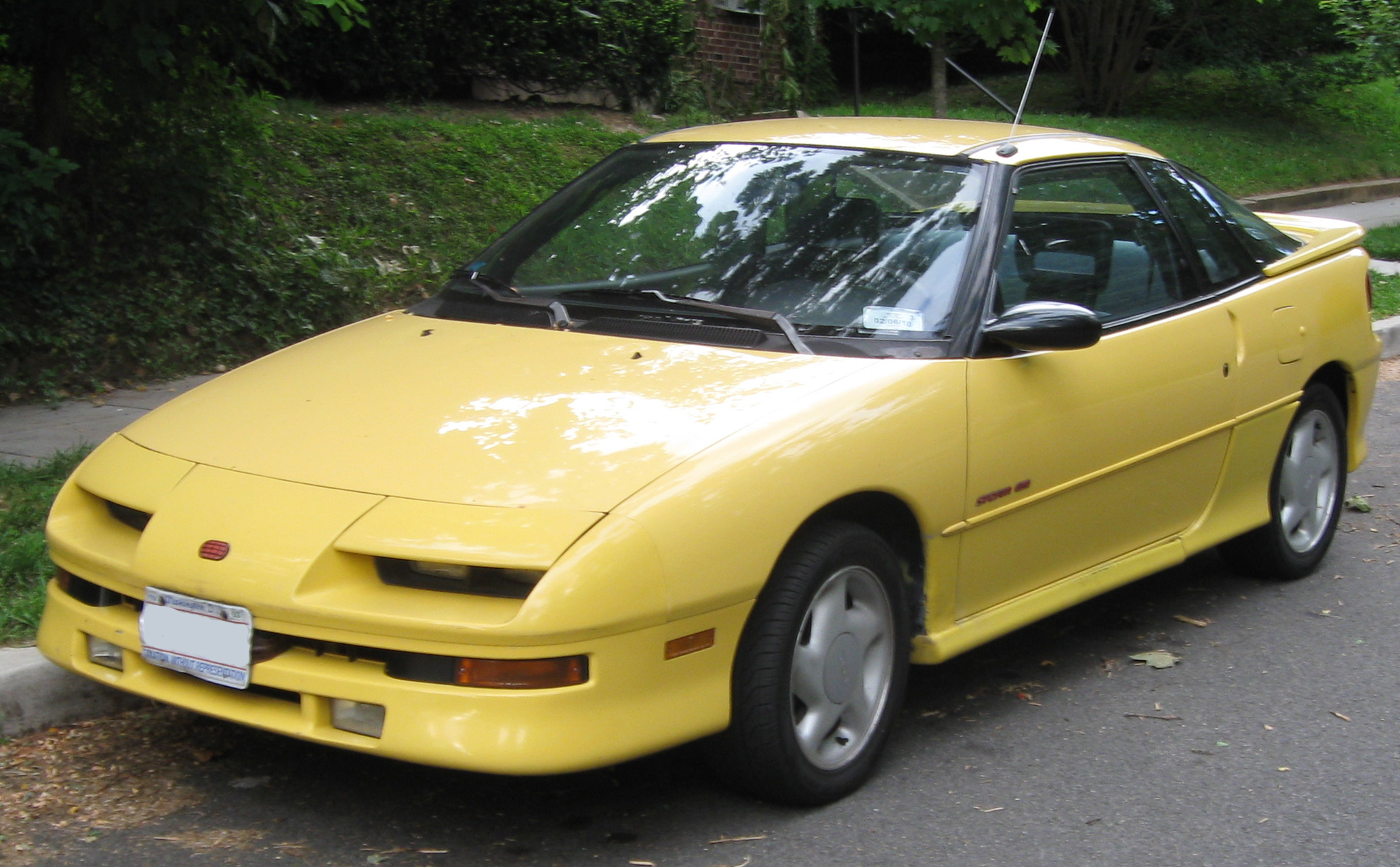
1991 Geo Storm GSi

The Storm was a sport compact based on the Isuzu Impulse, available as a three-door fastback "Sport Compact" and a two-door "Hatchback", the latter styled as a mini station wagon in profile, often referred to as the "Wagonback" in some markets. The Storm entered Geo's lineup in 1990 as a base model or in GSi trim, replacing the related Geo Spectrum. The base model came with a choice of either a 3-speed automatic or a 5-speed manual. The Storm line entered Canada in 1992, and the Hatchback (wagon) was offered only in base model trim. The GSi models came with either a 5-speed manual or a 4-speed automatic, better handling, a rear spoiler, bucket seats, and a more powerful DOHC engine. In 1992, the front and rear of all models were restyled, the GSi sported a bigger 1.8 liter DOHC engine, replacing the former 1.6 DOHC, and a redesigned rear spoiler. Despite strong sales the Storm was discontinued in 1993, this was due in part to Isuzu discontinuing their car lines, and refocusing on trucks and SUVs. The Geo Storm was the performance oriented vehicle of the Geo marque. The Storm and the Geo Spectrum were produced in Japan by Isuzu.

=== Tracker ===
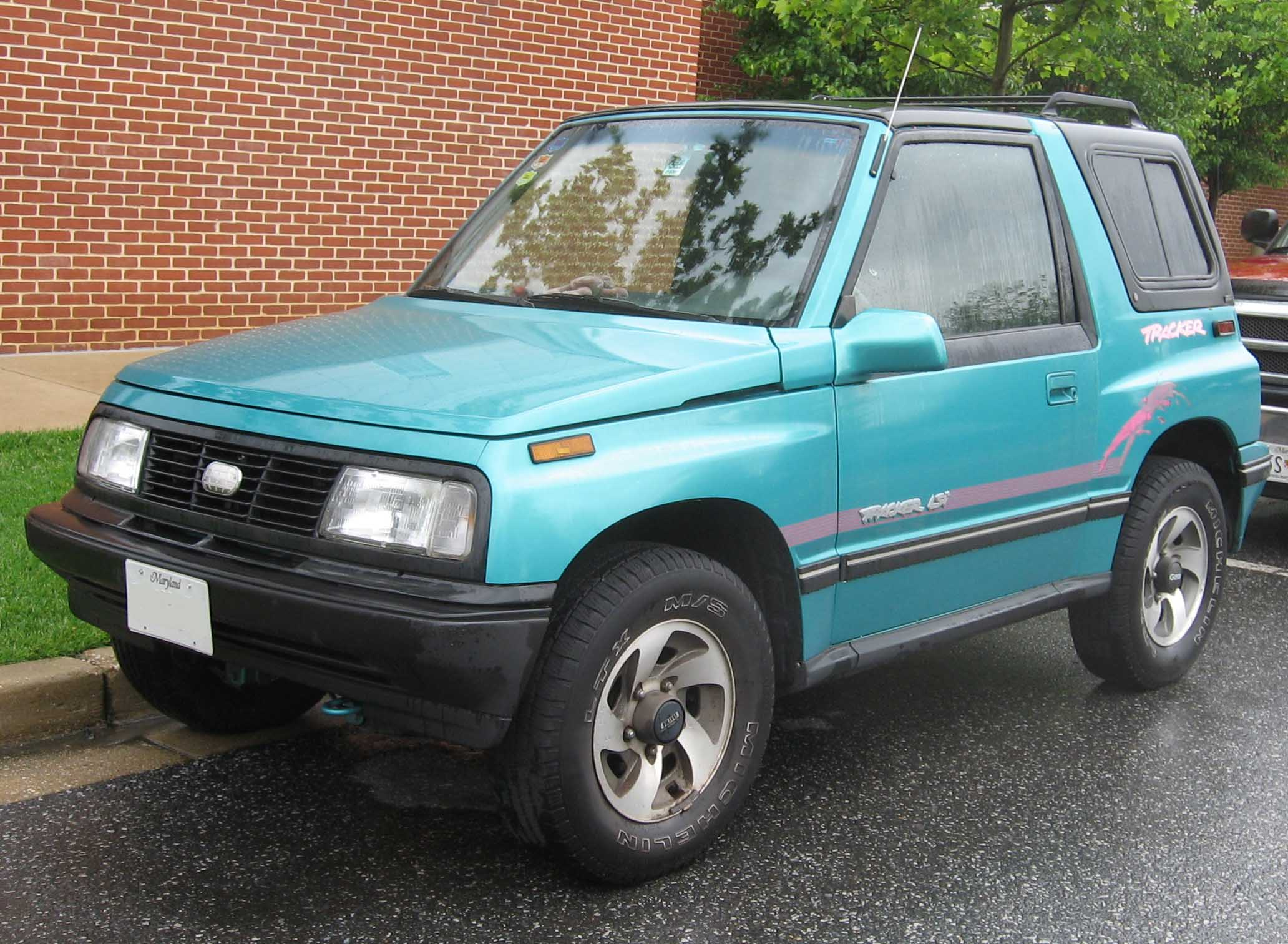
Geo Tracker

The Geo Tracker was an SUV introduced in 1989 and based on the Suzuki Sidekick. It was a low cost 4x4 vehicle, introduced as a two-door with either a convertible or fixed hard top in base or upscale LSi versions. All models between 1989 and 1990 were offered in 5-speed manual with four-wheel drive. In 1996, the two-door hard top was dropped in favor of the four-door model. The four-door offered a 95 hp (71 kW; 96 PS) engine and an optional four-speed automatic transmission. The Tracker was produced from 1989 to 1998 under the Geo marque, and 1999 to 2004 under Chevrolet itself, making it the longest running Geo model. The Tracker was completely redesigned for the 1999 model year.

== In popular culture ==
In the Simpsons episode "Homer Loves Flanders", while Homer Simpson chases a driving Ned Flanders on foot, Flanders' wife Maude tells him "Come on Ned, move this thing!" to which he replies "I can't, it's a Geo!".
