= Opel Kadett C =

Kadett C
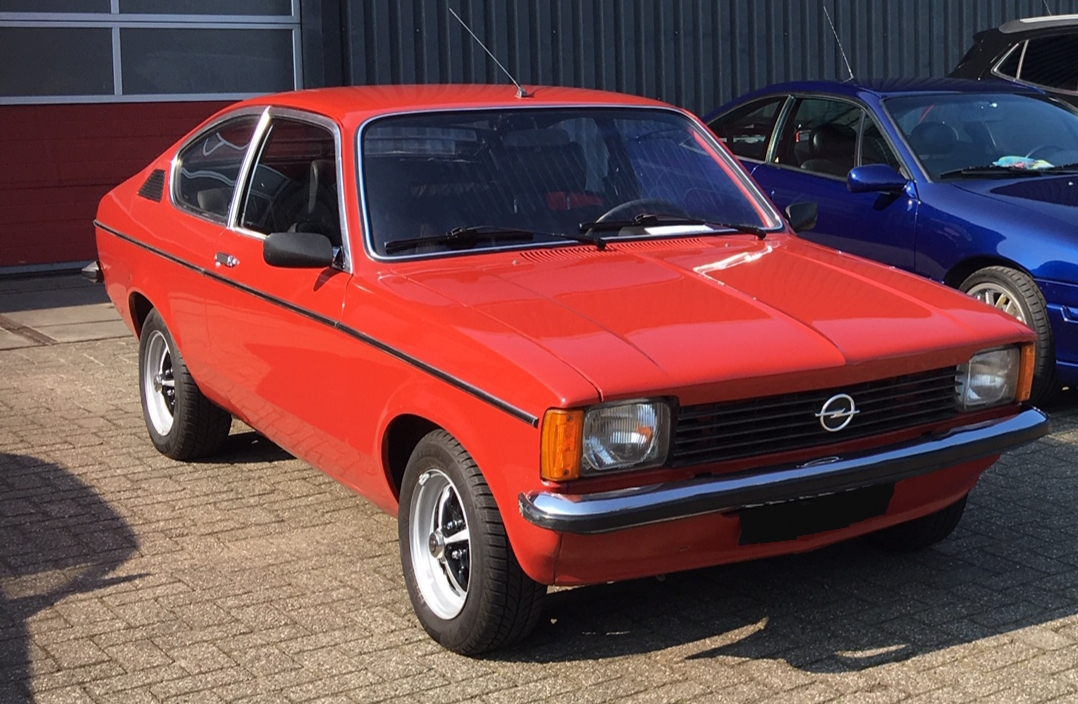
- Opel Kadett C Coupé from 1978

Overview
- Manufacturer: Opel (General Motors)
- Also called: Buick Opel (USA); Chevrolet Chevette (BRA); Daewoo Maepsy (ROK); Holden Gemini (AUS); Isuzu Gemini (J); Saehan Gemini/Bird/Maepsy (ROK); Opel K 180 (ARG); GMC Chevette (ARG); Vauxhall Chevette (UK)
- Production: 1973–1979
- Assembly: West Germany: Bochum; Belgium: Antwerp

Body and chassis
- Class: Small family car (C)
- Body style: "Limousine" (2/4-door saloon); "City" 3-door hatchback; "Caravan" (3-door estate); Coupé; "Aero" (targa-top cabriolet)

Powertrain
- Engine: Opel petrol engines: 1973–79: 1196 cc 12N/S; 1974–79: 993 cc 10N/S OHV I4 OHV I4; 1977–79: 1584 cc 16S CIH I4; 1975–77: 1897 cc 19E CIH I4; 1977–79: 1979 cc 20E/EH CIH I4
- Transmission: 4-speed manual 5-speed "dog leg" manual (GT/E); 3-speed automatic

Dimensions
- Wheelbase: 2,395 mm (94.3 in)
- Length: 4,127 mm (162.5 in); 3,922 mm (154.4 in) (City); 4,140 mm (163 in) (Caravan)
- Width: 1,580 mm (62 in)
- Height: 1,375 mm (54.1 in); 1,340 mm (53 in) (Coupé); 1,385 mm (54.5 in) (Caravan)
- Curb weight: 790 kg (1,742 lb) (Coupé)

Chronology
- Predecessor: Opel Kadett B
- Successor: Opel Kadett D

The Opel Kadett C is a small family car which was produced by the German automobile manufacturer Opel from 1973 to 1979. The Kadett C, which was the fourth generation of the Opel Kadett, was released in August 1973, and was Opel's version of the General Motors "T-Car". It was the last small Opel to feature rear-wheel drive, and remained in production at Opel's Bochum plant until July 1979, by which time Opel had produced 1,701,076. Of these, 52% had been exported outside West Germany, most of them to markets in other parts of western Europe. In other world markets, however, various badge engineered versions of the Kadett C remained in production as late as the mid-1990s under other GM brand names.

Despite being out of production since 1979, in Europe the Kadett C retains something of a cult following (along with its Vauxhall Chevette sister) largely due to its popularity in the sport of drifting, where its conventional rear-wheel-drive layout is valued, along with its ability to be easily upgraded with engines from larger Opel cars.

== Bodies ==
The body of the Kadett C was seen as being less lumpy and better proportioned than that of the Kadett B. In terms of overall dimensions, however, the two were actually very similar.

Most customers opted for the "Limousine" bodied saloon car which came with two doors. A four-door "Limousine" was produced mostly for export to markets where cars of this size with only two doors encountered customer resistance. In West Germany itself, however, the small family car market continued to be dominated and defined by Volkswagen for whom two doors in a small family car was still quite sufficient: the four door Kadett C is remembered in Germany as an "export special". The Limousine body accounted for just under 63% of the Opel Kadett Cs produced. A further 11% were three door estate-bodied cars badged, following Opel tradition, as the Kadett Caravan, with the two-door coupés accounting for slightly under 10%. Publicity of the time, possibly originating with Mercedes-Benz, indicated that in order to minimize the risk of fire in the event of collision, the safest position for a car's fuel tank was above the rear axle between the passenger cabin and the boot/trunk, and this is where the Kadett C "Limousine" and "Coupé" had their fuel tanks fitted, accessible for refilling via the (unexpectedly, hinged,) extractor vent on the car's right-side C-pillar. On the "Caravan" bodied estate car the fuel tank was a flatter shape, and was positioned under the rear cargo area.

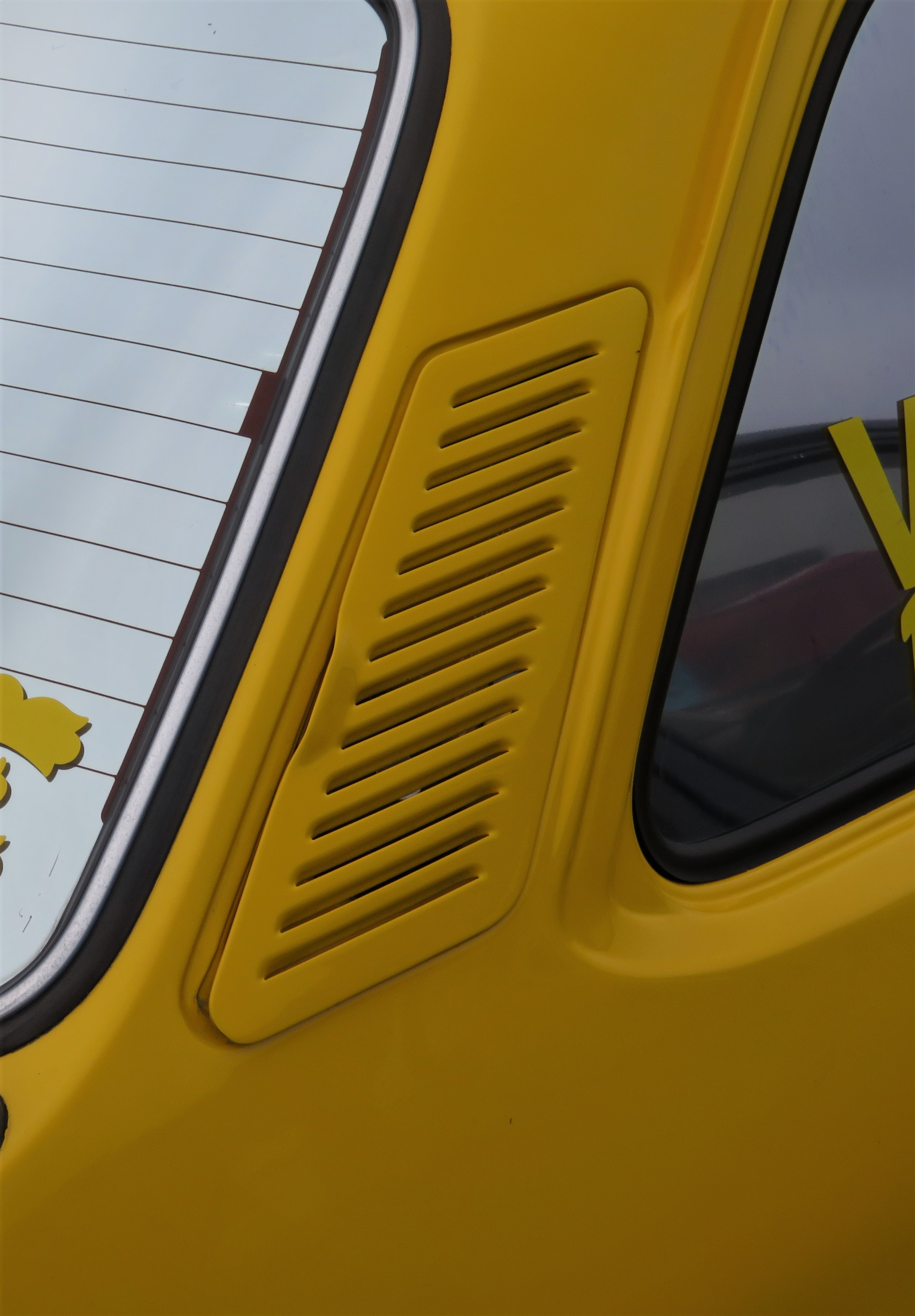
On saloon-bodied cars the fuel filler opening was concealed behind a flap on the c-pillar designed to resemble an extractor vent

=== Kadett City ===
At the end of May 1975, the "Kadett City" was added to the range. This was a three-door hatchback intended to compete on price (though not on space efficiency) with the Ford Fiesta which launched in Germany a year later. The concept had first originated from Vauxhall's "S-car" study, but for budgetary reasons GM folded it into the T-car project. The City first appeared as its Vauxhall Chevette-badged equivalent in 1975, with the Opel Kadett version following soon afterwards. The unique panels for the Kadett City were produced at Vauxhall's Ellesmere Port plant and exported to Bochum for assembly into finished bodyshells. The Kadett City sat on the same wheelbase as the other Kadett Cs, but the rear overhang was shortened. The rear valance panel was carried over from the Chevette, and this resulted in the unused license plate plinth being clearly visible, as the Kadett City retained its licence plate mounting between the rear lamp clusters.

The fuel tank was positioned under the floor of the luggage compartment at the back, as on the Caravan bodied cars, but the fuel tank on the "Kadett City" had a capacity of only 37-litres as against 43-litres for the slightly longer "Kadett Caravan". Both models featured rear seats that could be folded forward to give a long and relatively unimpeded load area. 263,090 "Kadett City" bodied cars were produced, representing more than 15% of the Kadett Cs produced by Opel, Germany.

Exhibited at the Geneva Motor Show in March 1976, and included in the range from that year was the Aero-Kadett, an open-top Kadett with targa roll bar, detachable roof insert and a separate convertible top aft of the roll bar (like the contemporary Lancia Beta Spider). This car was built in limited numbers by Karosserie Baur in Stuttgart. Removing the removable parts of the Kadett Aero's roof was a cumbersome process and the manufacturer's recommended retail price was considerably higher than that asked by Volkswagen for their 1303 Cabriolet. The Kadett Aero struggled to find buyers, and was withdrawn early in 1978 by which time 1,242 had been produced. Several decades later, however, the rarity of the Kadett Aero is one of the features that helps it to draw continued interest from old-timer enthusiasts.

== Engines ==
=== Smaller Opel OHV 4-cylinder engines ===
==== 1.2-litre (1973–1979) ====
The Kadett C was launched in Germany with the 1.2-litre engine that had become an option for the Kadett B in 1971. As before in high compression (9.2:1 later, in 1975, reduced to 9.0:1)) "1.2S" form the unit returned a maximum output of 60 PS (44 kW; 59 hp) at 5,400 rpm. However, the 1,196 cc engine was now also available as a "1.2N" with a lower 7.8: 1 compression ratio and in this form it produced a maximum 52 PS (38 kW; 51 hp) of power at 5,600 rpm. In August 1976, the power output of the low compression ratio unit was improved to 55 PS (40 kW; 54 hp) at 5,400rpm, at the cost of a small reduction in maximum torque.

The 1.2-litre unit powered 1,389,940 of the European Kadett Cs, equivalent to almost 82% of the Kadett Cs produced by Opel in West Germany and at their daughter plant in Belgium.

==== 1.0-litre (1974–1979) ====
From March 1974, Opel added a low-compression, 1.0-litre version of the engine to the range. This featured the same 993 cc capacity as when first seen in the Kadett A, although now the compression ratio was slightly higher (7.9:1) than it had been in 1962. Claimed maximum power at 40 PS (29 kW; 39 hp) was also the same as in 1962, although now at a slightly higher engine speed of 5400 rpm. Performance, with a top speed at 127 km/h (79 mph) for the "Limousine" and 122 km/h (76 mph) for the "Caravan" was, by the standards of 1974, distinctly underwhelming with this power unit. Quoted fuel consumption was slightly better than with the 1.2-litre cars, but in terms of overall running costs for the cars there was no corresponding reduction in running costs when choosing the 1.0 engine in preference to the 1.2N. A more powerful "1.0 S" engine was also available in export markets where it suited the tax structure, with 48 PS (35 kW) at 5600 rpm.

Nevertheless, following the 1973 Oil price shock car buyers in western Europe had become far more economy minded. In the Kadett B, the 1.0 engines had been reserved for Mediterranean countries with punitive, displacement-based tax levels, but with the Kadett C the manufacturer begun to make the smaller unit available to West German domestic buyers as well. 254,723 Kadett Cs using the 1.0 engine were produced whereas only 10,691 of the Kadett Bs produced had incorporated this anemic motor., although it would appear again as the entry level engine in the Opel Corsa A in 1982.

=== Larger Opel OHV "CIH" 4-cylinder engines ===
==== 1.6-litre (1977–1979) ====
May 1977 saw the addition of a smaller version of Opel's Camshaft in Head (CIH) engine to the Kadett range, this time in high compression form as the "1.6S" unit. The 1584 cc engine shared the 69.8 mm (2.75 in) stroke of the larger CIH units, but the bore was reduced to 85 mm (3.3 in). Maximum power of 75 PS (55 kW; 74 hp) was quoted, providing for a listed top speed of 160 km/h (99 mph) in saloon bodied cars.

==== 1.9-litre (1975–1977) ====
For its first two years the Kadett C was offered with a choice between only the 1.0-litre and 1.2-litre motors, but September 1975 saw a return of the larger CIH power units to the Kadett range in the form of the Kadett GT/E, inheritor of the Kadett Rallye's mantle. The GT/E's 1897 cc engine had till 1973 featured in the earlier Kadett B range of power units, but now it incorporated "Bosch L-Jetronic" fuel-injection. Maximum output of 105 PS (77 kW; 104 hp) at 5400 rpm was virtually identical to that achieved by the Kadett B with its limited edition "Hochleistung" (high power) version of the same engine, but the earlier car had achieved its power level using old fashioned twin carburetors, a fuel feed approach now losing out to fuel injection in the face of increasingly stringent emission regulations.

==== 2.0-litre (1977–1979) ====
In September 1977, the 1.9-litre engine was replaced, in the "Rallye" Kadett, with a new enlarged 1979 cc unit. Fitted in the "Kadett Rallye 2.0E" this engine produced 110 PS (81 kW; 108 hp) of power at 5400 rpm, which propelled the car to a top speed of 189 km/h (117 mph), comfortably faster than any previous "Rallye" branded performance Kadett. The car's fuel consumption, listed at 9.5 l/100 km (30 mpg_{‑imp}; 25 mpg_{‑US}), was also a clear improvement.

== Running gear ==
=== Transmission ===
The car came with a four speed all-synchromesh manual transmission as standard, gear selection being performed using a centrally positioned floor-mounted lever. A five-speed manual transmission was offered as an option on top of the range GT/E Kadetts that appeared in 1975, and became a standard feature of the (now) 2-litre Kadett GT/E in 1977. On the 1.2 S and 1.6-litre engined cars it was also possible to specify the option of a "GM Strasbourg" Turbo-Hydramatic 180 three-speed automatic transmission.

=== Brakes ===
At launch, Kadett Cs powered by the 1.0-litre and the lower compression version of the 1.2-litre engine were delivered fitted with 200 mm (7.9 in) diameter drum brakes on all four wheels. It was possible to specify front disc brakes, which, following an upgrade in January 1975, became standard fittings on all Kadetts. Servo-assistance for the brakes was also initially an option which became a standard fitting – in this case from May 1975 – on these less powerful Kadetts. On cars fitted with the higher compression version of the 1.2-litre engine and on cars with larger engines, the combination of front wheel disc brakes and rear wheel drum brakes, supported by servo-assistance had come as standard equipment from 1973. The brakes on the Kadett C were operated via a twin circuit hydraulic mechanism.

== More equipment and a small facelift (1977–1978) ==
In terms of comfort and equipment, the Kadett C was launched with two available levels of trim and equipment, either as a standard or a "Kadett L" model. In May 1977 these were joined by the "Kadett Berlina", featuring the larger 1.6-litre "S" engine under the bonnet/hood and an enhanced package of trim and equipment on the inside. On the outside the Berlina was distinguished by a discrete chrome side strip along the length of the car redesigned headlights, now rectangular in shape and a little larger than hitherto. The larger headlights appeared to be part of a single unit also incorporating turn indicators now positioned directly adjacent to the lights at the car's front corners. The Opel "Blitz" logo was also larger, and moved from the leading edge of the bonnet into the grille. The new headlights and front indicator flashers were also included from May 1977 on the "L" models, while the standard cars retained the smaller headlamps with which the Kadett C had been launched, along, as before, with turn indicators below the front bumper.

In the Autumn/Fall of 1978 the larger headlights and turn indicators were also applied to the remaining Kadett Cs.

== Broadening the range for the sportingly inclined ==
=== Kadett GT/E (1975–1979) ===
The Kadett C sporting "Coupé GT/E" models appeared in August 1975, a year before the rival Volkswagen Golf GTI. The GT/E was priced, in 1975, at 12,950 Marks, approximately 30% higher than the manufacturer's listed retail price (9,970 Marks) for a "1.2S" powered Kadett coupé. The fuel-injected performance coupé now provided a basis for competition cars. Advertising of the time featured an aggressive two-tone yellow and white paint scheme, although it was also possible to specify a conventional "everyday" body colour. The Kadett GT/E was powered by the 1979 cc "20EH" (CIH) unit which had Bosch's new generation K-Jetronic fuel feed system and a raised compression ratio and a resulting increase in maximum power to 115 PS (85 kW; 113 hp). The rear wheel suspension was enhanced through the integration of vertically mounted telescopic gas-filled Bilstein dampers which enhanced road holding and provided a firm "sporting" quality to the ride. The lighter Golf GTI was launched with 110 PS (81 kW; 108 hp) of power, using the same Bosch fuel injection system.

Beginning in 1975, the Kadett GT/E became available with a five-speed manual transmission at extra cost. In 1977, the five-speed transmission became a standard feature on the Kadett GT/E.

- Opel Kadett GT/E — Black/yellow — 8660 produced between 1975 and 1977.
- Opel Kadett GT/E 2 — Yellow/white — 2254 produced between 1977 and 1979.
- Opel Kadett Rallye 1.6S and 2.0E — Yellow/white — 8549 produced between 1978 and 1979.

=== Kadett Rallye (1977–1979) ===
September 1977 saw the return of the "Kadett Rallye" label for a Kadett Coupé that provided seriously superior performance to the "shopping trolley" Kadetts of the time, but was half a notch down from the GT/E in terms of price and of uncompromising performance. The Rallye was offered with a choice between the carburetted "1.6S" and the fuel injected "2.0E" engine, the larger of which at the same time became available in a high performance version of Opel's larger Rekord E. Outputs are 75 and 110 PS (55 and 81 kW), respectively. The rear-wheel suspension was enhanced through the inclusion of vertically mounted telescopic dampers produced by the manufacturer's Spanish component factory.

== The "world car" ==
In Brazil the Kadett C was released in 1973, six months before its European release, as the Chevrolet Chevette. It was available with a choice of three OHC petrol engines, in 1.4 L, 1.6 L, and 1.0 L displacements (the latter available only for the 1992/1993 model year); 1.4 L and 1.6 L versions were also available running on ethanol.

This Chevette went through several redesigns — first front and rear panels similar to the Opel version, then a look similar to the British Vauxhall Chevette, and finally a design reminiscent of the updated US Chevrolet Chevette version. It was available in several different bodies: hatchback (1979–1987), three-door estate (called Chevrolet Marajó, 1980–1989), pickup (Chevy 500, 1984–1995) and saloon (1973–1993). The Chevette sold over 1.6 million units in Brazil until replaced by the Chevrolet Corsa.

The T-Car was also built in Japan by Isuzu and sold as the Isuzu Gemini and in Australia where it was marketed as the Holden Gemini. In South Korea, Saehan Motor then Daewoo Motor built a version of the Gemini originally known as the Saehan Gemini, later becoming the Daewoo Maepsy and Maepsy-Na after a final facelift.

The Kadett C reached the United States as the Buick–Opel. This was an Isuzu Gemini; an updated version of this car was marketed in the US as the Isuzu I-Mark in the early 1980s.

In Argentina GM manufactured a modified version with a locally developed 1.8 L 4-cylinder OHV motor — based on the six-cylinder 194 engine — as the Opel K-180 in three versions "Base", "Rally" and "LX" from 1974 until 1979. Production ended when GM Argentina closed its doors.

The T-Car also formed the basis of the British Vauxhall Chevette, which had a restyled front end and launched with a hatchback body, in addition to using a 1,256 cc OHV (overhead valve) Vauxhall engine rather than the 1,196 cc OHV Opel engine. The Chevette made the Kadett C notable by allowing it to become Opel's first hatchback — a new version named Kadett City appeared in August 1975, based on the Chevette's hatchback body. The Kadett's coupé body style was never manufactured as a Chevette however.

== End of production ==
Production of the Kadett C ended in July 1979 in preparation for the introduction of its successor — the Kadett D. The new car (based on the new GM T80 platform) was a radical departure from its predecessors, being front-wheel drive, and sold primarily as a hatchback to compete with C-segment rivals such as the Volkswagen Golf and the forthcoming third generation Ford Escort. Whilst mainstream Opel production had ceased, the Kadett C continued in its many badge engineered, and derivative versions around the world for several years afterward.

Most notably in Europe, the Kadett C's sister car – the Vauxhall Chevette – remained in production until 1984, and was imported to Germany simply as the "Chevette" (it was never officially badged as an Opel or a Vauxhall) — mainly to provide an alternative for those customers who resisted front-wheel drive and give the option of a traditional saloon body style.

The hatchback "City" version also continued with Chevette badging, but these models were effectively replaced by the Opel Corsa A (Vauxhall Nova) in 1983.

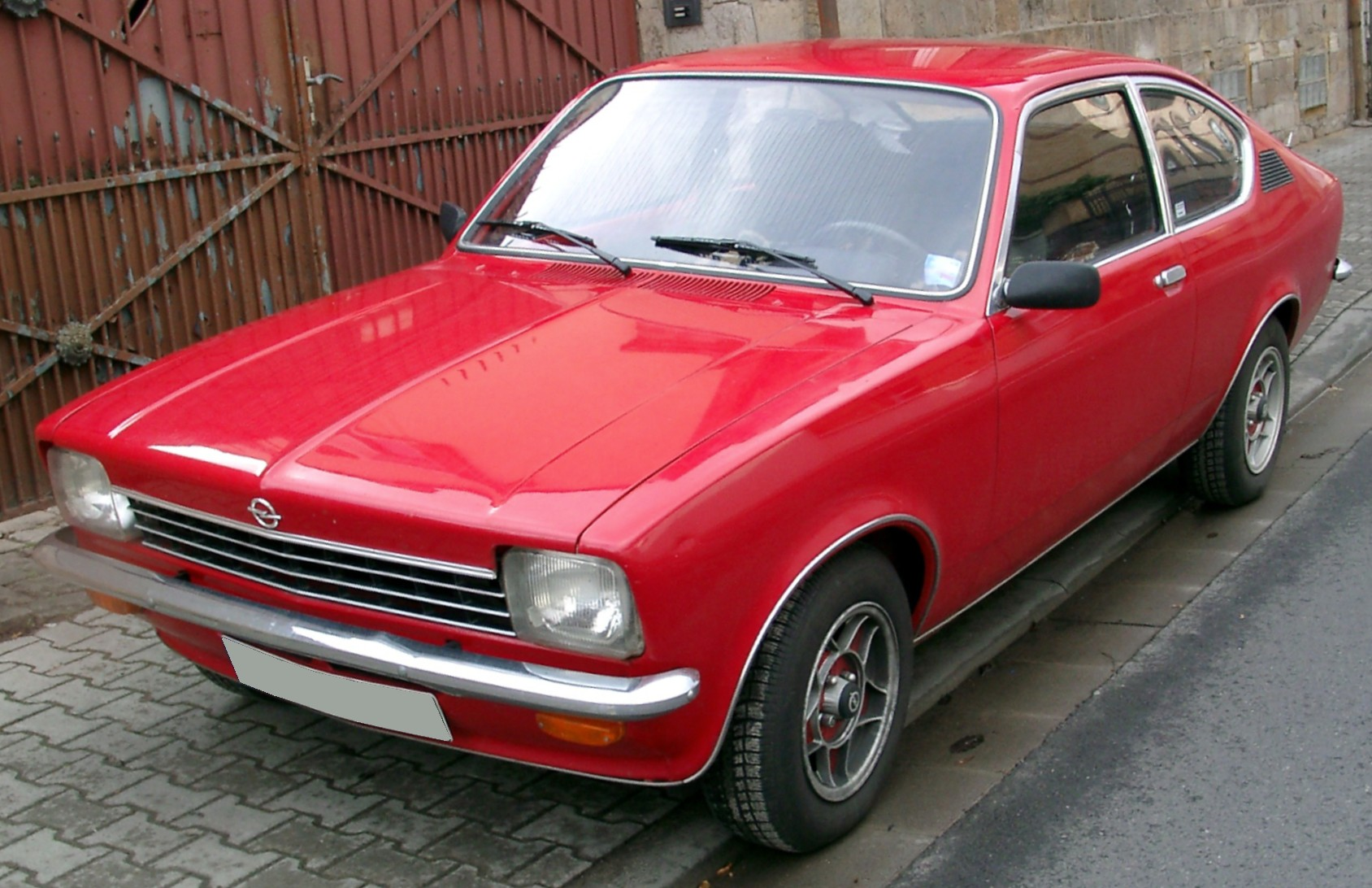
Opel Kadett Coupé (1973–1977)

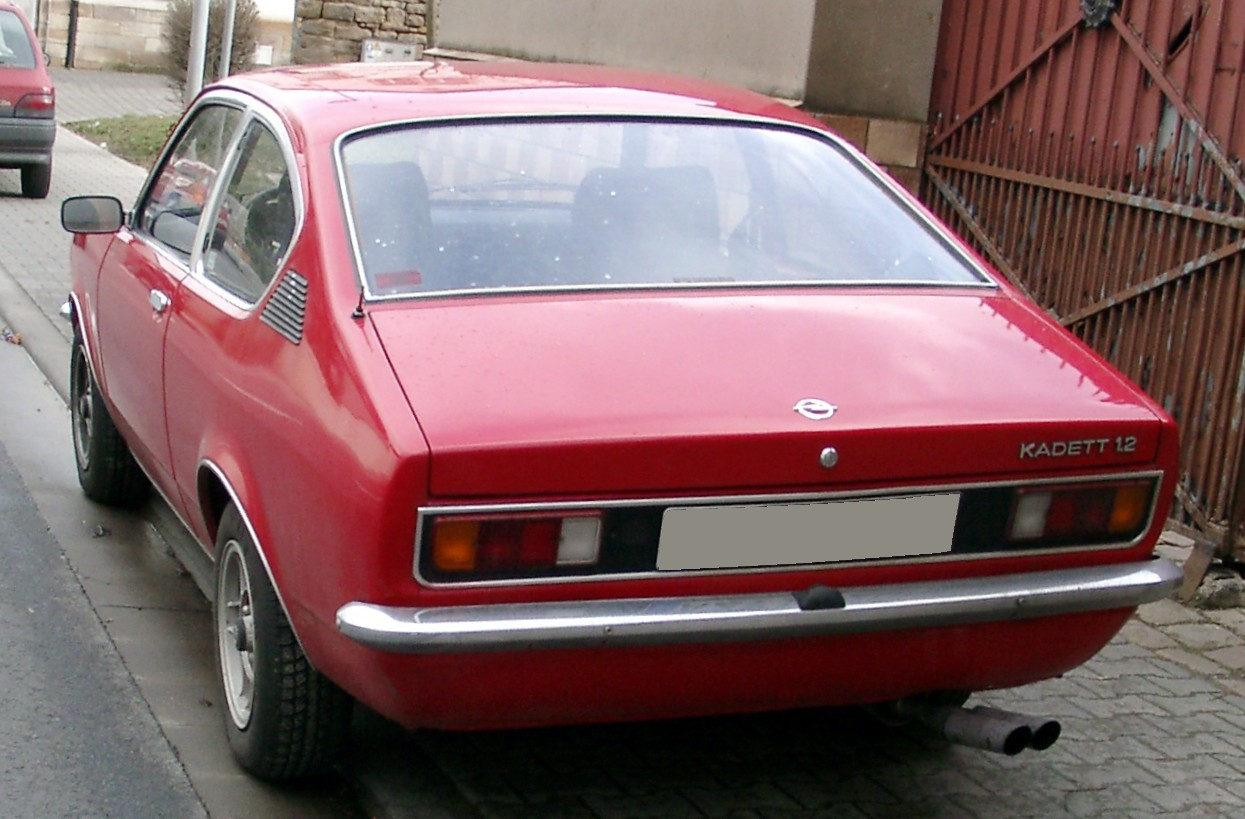
Rear

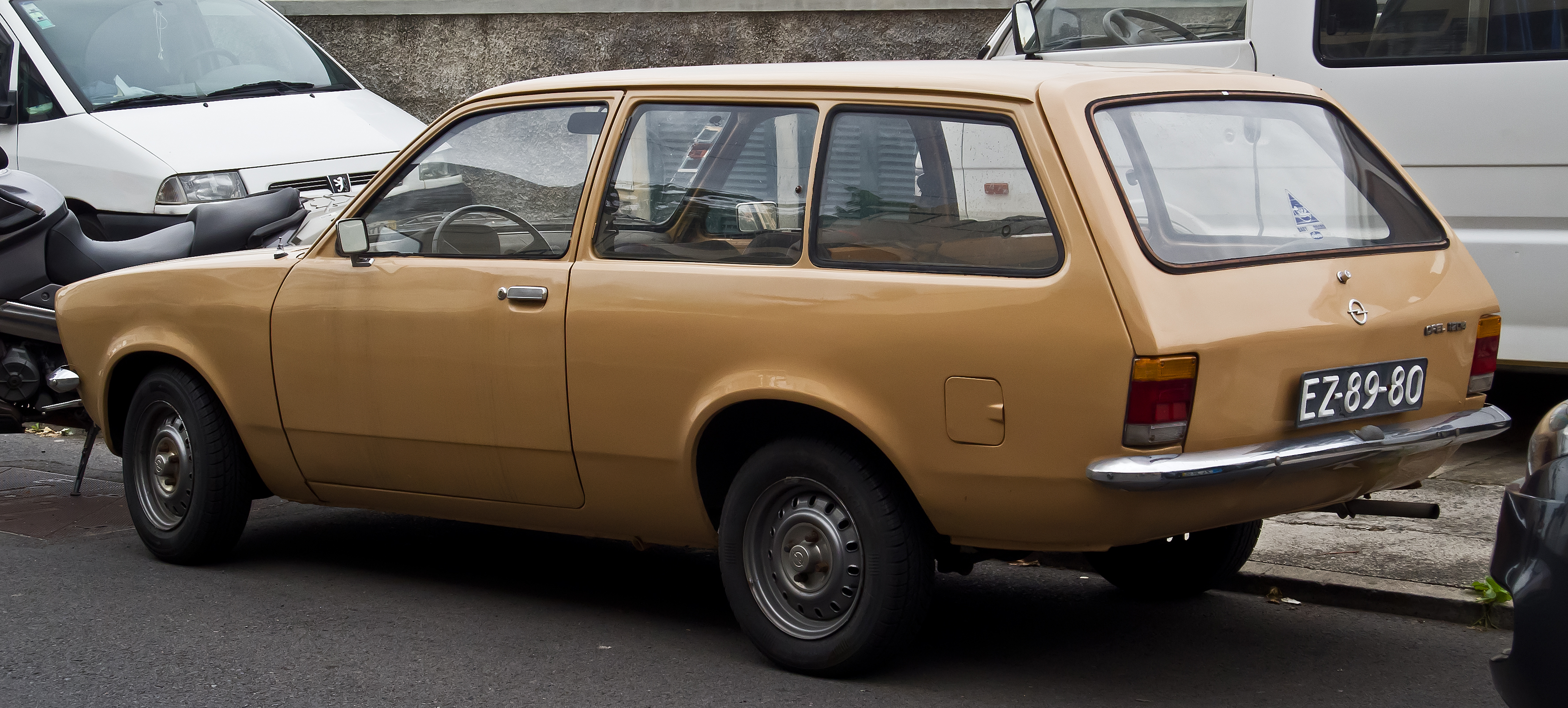
Opel Kadett Caravan (1973–1977)

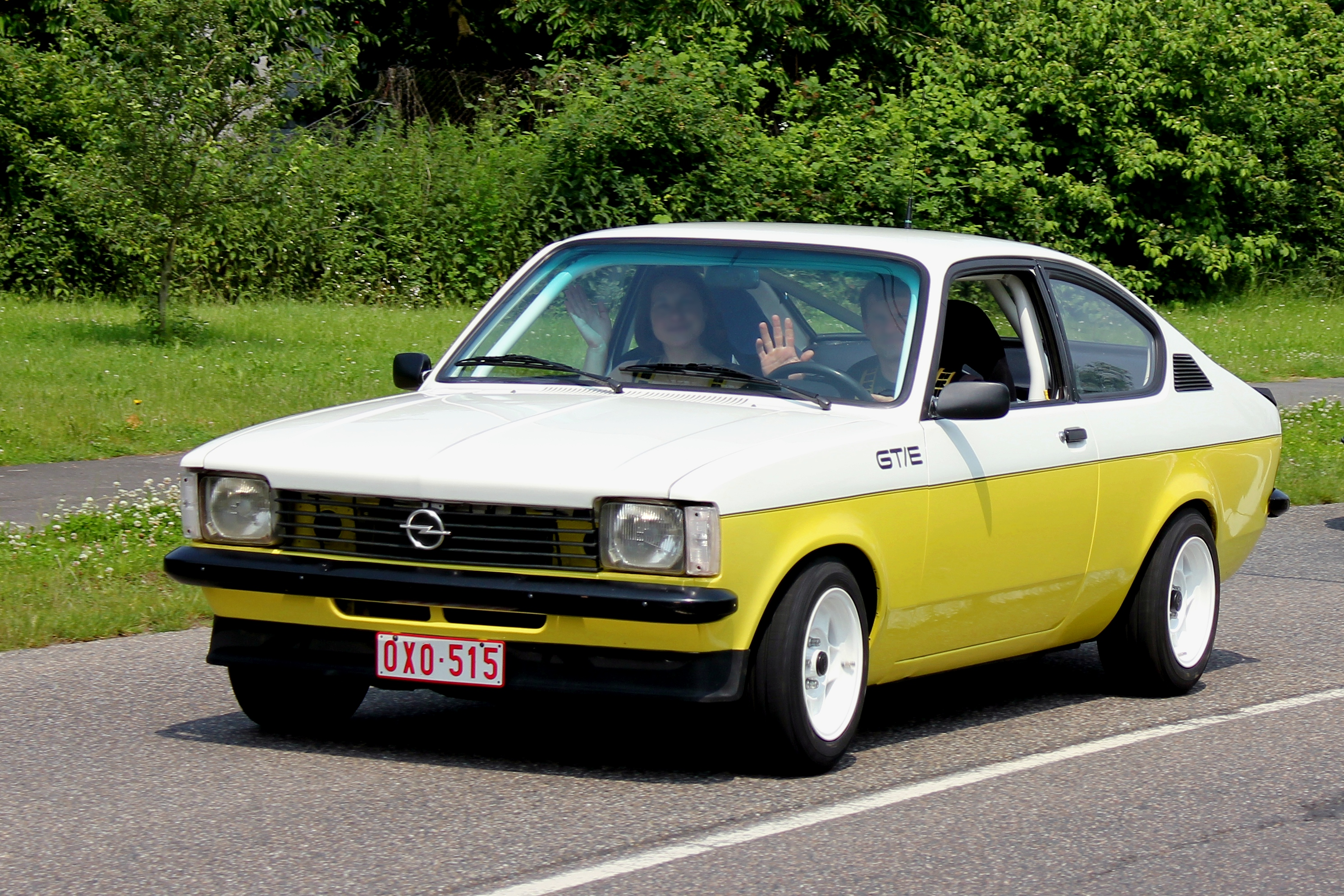
Opel Kadett Coupé GT/E

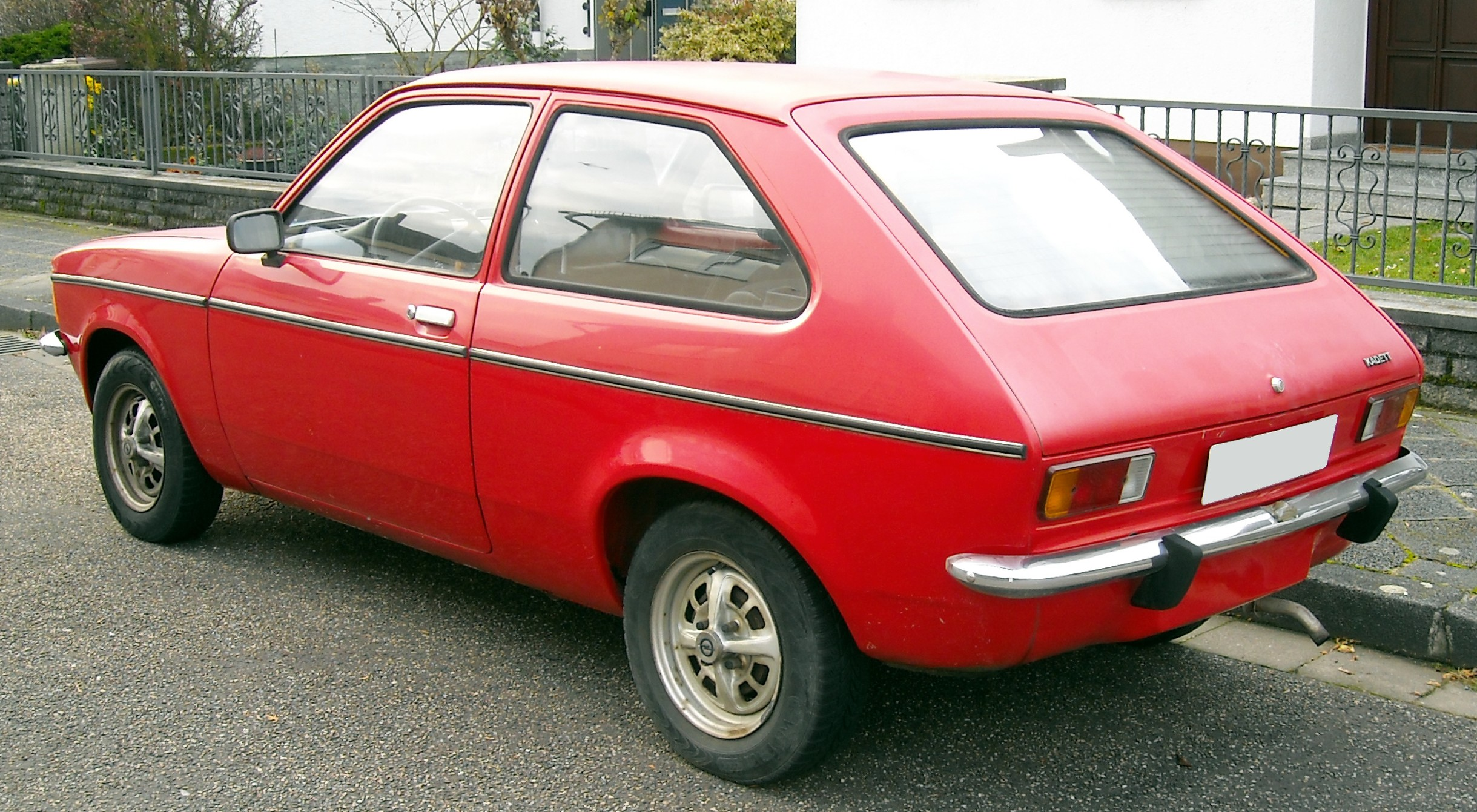
Rear-view of Opel Kadett "City"

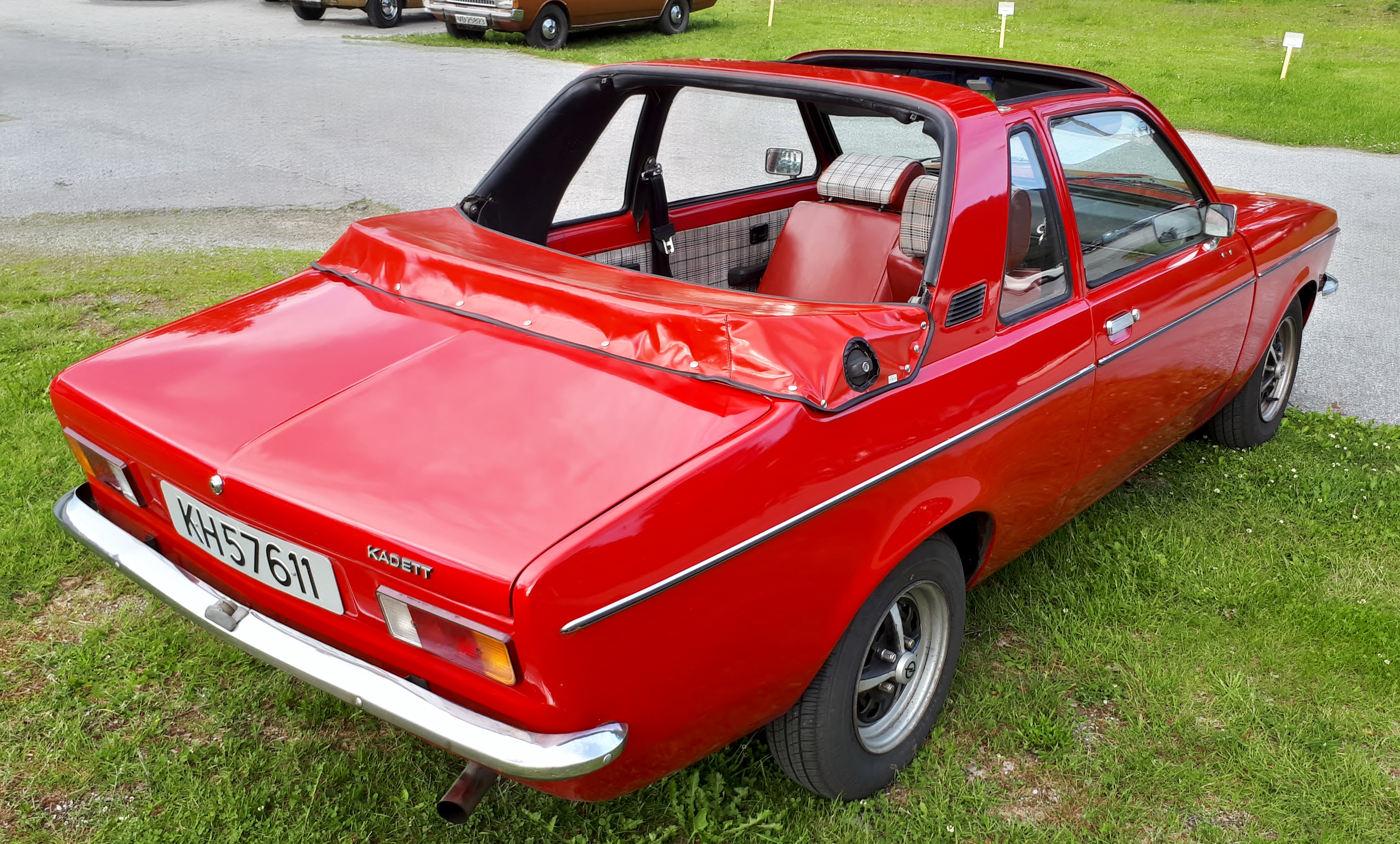
Opel Kadett C "Aero" (rear)

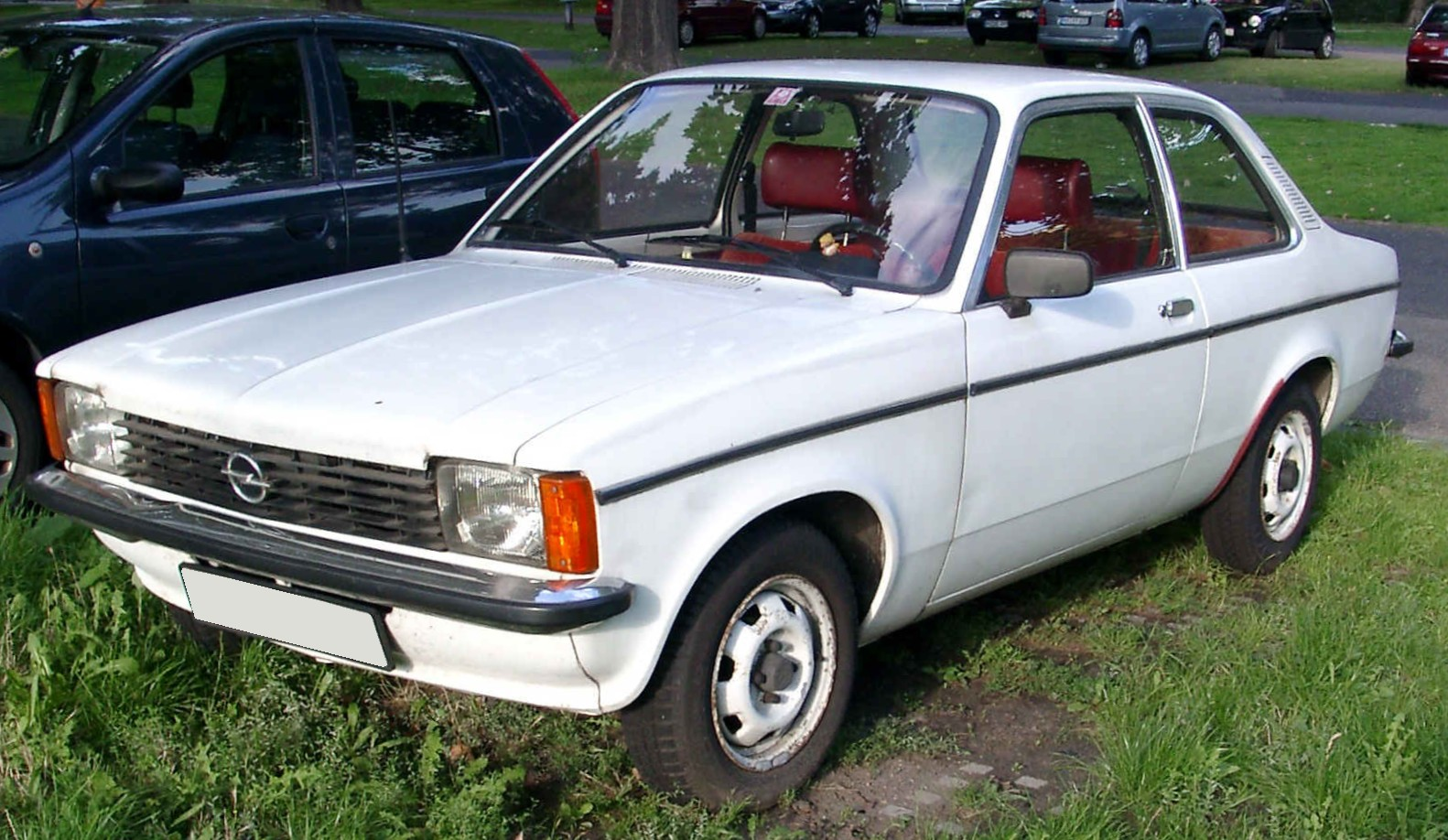
Opel Kadett C 2 door "Limousine" (post 1977 facelift)

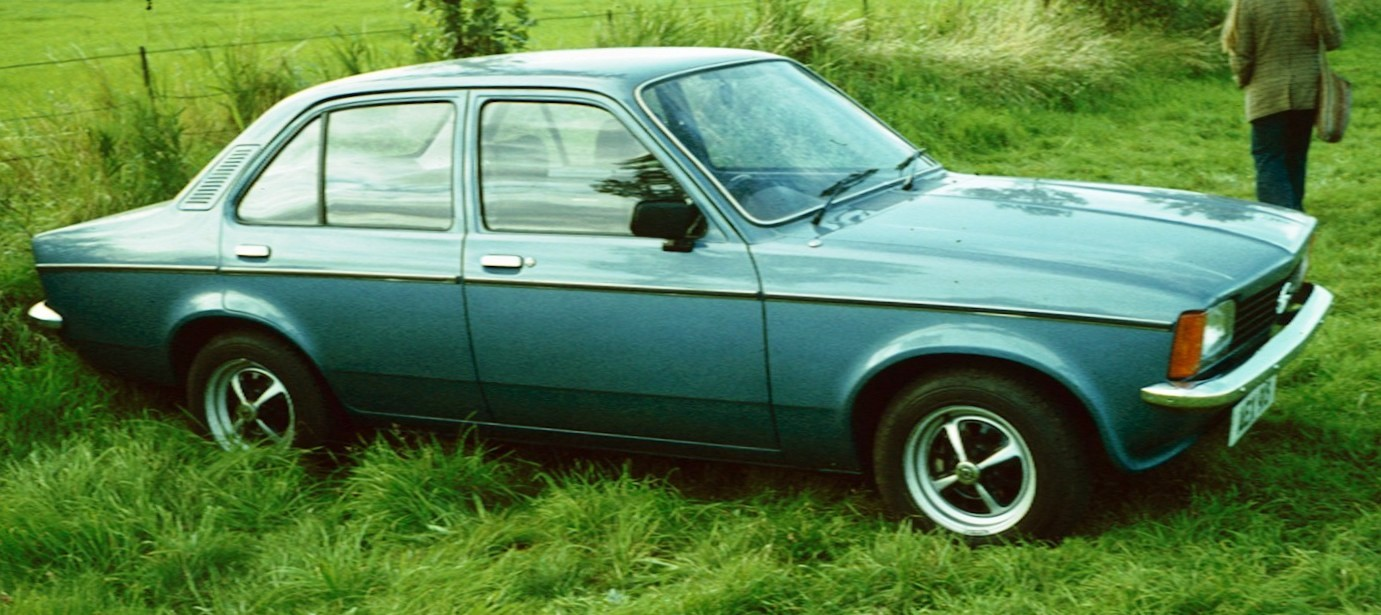
Opel Kadett C 4-door "Limousine"
