= K180 =

K180 or K-180 may refer to:

- K-180 (Kansas highway), a former state highway in Kansas
- Opel K 180, an automobile
