= Chevelle =

Chevelle may refer to:

- Chevrolet Chevelle, mid-sized automobile produced by General Motors from 1963 to 1977
- Chevelle (band), American hard rock/alternative metal band
- The Chevelles, Australian pop band

== People ==
- Chevelle Brooks, Miss Continental Plus 2002
- Chevelle Franklyn (born 1974), Jamaican reggae and gospel singer
- Chevelle Hallback (born 1971), American boxer

== See also ==
- Chevette (disambiguation)
