= General Motors T platform (RWD) =

Automotive platform

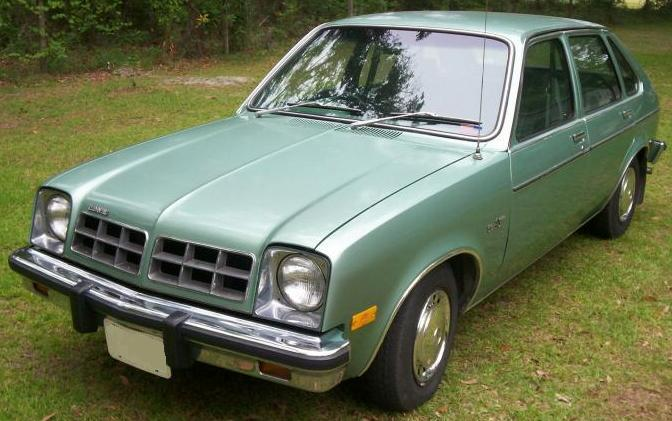
1978 Chevrolet Chevette

The General Motors T-car was a platform designation for a worldwide series of rear-wheel drive, unibody subcompact cars. It was General Motors' first attempt to develop a small car to be sold internationally with engineering assistance from Isuzu of Japan and GM's Opel Division of Germany. GM's European divisions Vauxhall and Opel, and Australian division Holden were already producing small vehicles for their respective local markets, but subcompact car production wasn't being done by GM in North America until the introduction of the Vega earlier. Subcompacts from international divisions were being offered in North America as captive imports.

A stretched version of the platform was developed by Opel to create the mid-size (extended sub-compact) 'U-Car', which formed the basis of the Opel Ascona B and Vauxhall Cavalier Mk1

The T-platform was superseded by the T80 platform, whilst the J-body platform replaced the U-Cars - with both the T80 and J-body platforms being front wheel drive.

== List of GM T-cars (rear-wheel drive) ==
Body styles; (1) Coupe; (2) 2-door sedan (B11); (3) 3-door hatchback (B08); (4) 4-door sedan (B69); (5) 5-door hatchback (B68) (wheelbase 2in. longer than the others); (w) 3-door wagon (B15); (t) Pickup truck (v) Sedan delivery (B70) (Panel Van).

- Argentina
  - GMC Chevette 4
  - Opel K-180 4
- Australia
  - Holden Gemini 1, 4, w
  - Holden Piazza Coupé
- Brazil
  - Chevrolet Chevette 2,3,4
  - Chevrolet Marajó w
  - Chevrolet Chevy 500 t
- Canada
  - Chevrolet Chevette 3,5
  - Pontiac Acadian 3, 5
- Colombia
  - Chevrolet Chevette 3, 4
- Ecuador
  - Aymesa Cóndor 2,3,t
  - Chevrolet San Remo 4
- Germany
  - Opel Kadett C 1,2,3,4,w, targa
- Indonesia
  - Holden Gemini 4
- Japan
  - Isuzu Bellett Gemini 1,4
  - Isuzu Gemini 1, 4
  - Isuzu Piazza Coupe, totally different body styling.
- Malaysia
  - Opel Gemini
- New Zealand
  - Vauxhall Chevette 2,3,4,w
  - Vauxhall Chevanne v
  - Isuzu Gemini 1, 4
  - Holden Gemini 4, w
- South Korea
  - Saehan Bird 4
  - Saehan Max t
  - Daewoo Maepsy 4
  - Daewoo Max t
- UK
  - Vauxhall Chevette 2,3,4,w
  - Bedford Chevanne v
- United States
  - Chevrolet Chevette 3,5
  - Opel Kadett 1,4;
  - Pontiac T1000 3,5
  - Opel-Isuzu 1,4
  - Isuzu Impulse See "Piazza/Impulse" above
  - Isuzu I-Mark 1,4
- Uruguay All models produced locally in fiberglass reinforced plastic
  - Grumett 250m
  - Grumett Chevette
  - Grumett Sport
- Venezuela
  - Chevrolet Chevette
  - Chevrolet San Remo w

== See also ==
- List of General Motors platforms
- General Motors T platform
