= Chevette =

Chevette may refer to:

- Various cars manufactured by General Motors
  - Chevrolet Chevette, a subcompact car
  - Vauxhall Chevette, a supermini car
  - GMC Chevette, a sedan
- "Chevette", the first song on Audio Adrenaline's fourth studio album, Some Kind of Zombie

== See also ==
- Chevrolet Chevelle
