= Opel K 180 =

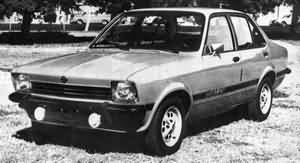
- Opel K 180 Rally

Overview
- Manufacturer: General Motors de Argentina
- Production: 1974–1978
- Assembly: Argentina: San Martín, Buenos Aires

Body and chassis
- Body style: 4-door sedan

Powertrain
- Engine: 1797 cc Chevrolet 110 I4
- Transmission: 4-speed manual

Chronology
- Predecessor: None
- Successor: GMC Chevette

The Opel K 180 is an automobile which was manufactured by GM Argentina S.A. from 1974 to 1978. It was a variation of General Motors' T-car platform, also used in the Opel Kadett, Chevrolet Chevette and Isuzu Gemini. The K 180 differed from the Kadett in that it had an Argentinian-designed 1.8-litre engine, derived from the locally built Chevrolet 194 engine. Fitted with a downdraught Bendix carburetor and with a 8.2:1 compression ratio, it develops a claimed 83 hp (62 kW) SAE at 5200 rpm.

In 1976 the sporting Rally version was added to the lineup, featuring a rev counter, black bumpers, black striping, and other such accoutrements. The next year the more luxurious K 180 LX version was added. The K 180 was awarded Car of the Year in 1977 by APICA, an association of automotive journalists.

It was replaced by the GMC Chevette in 1992, fourteen years after K 180 production had ended.

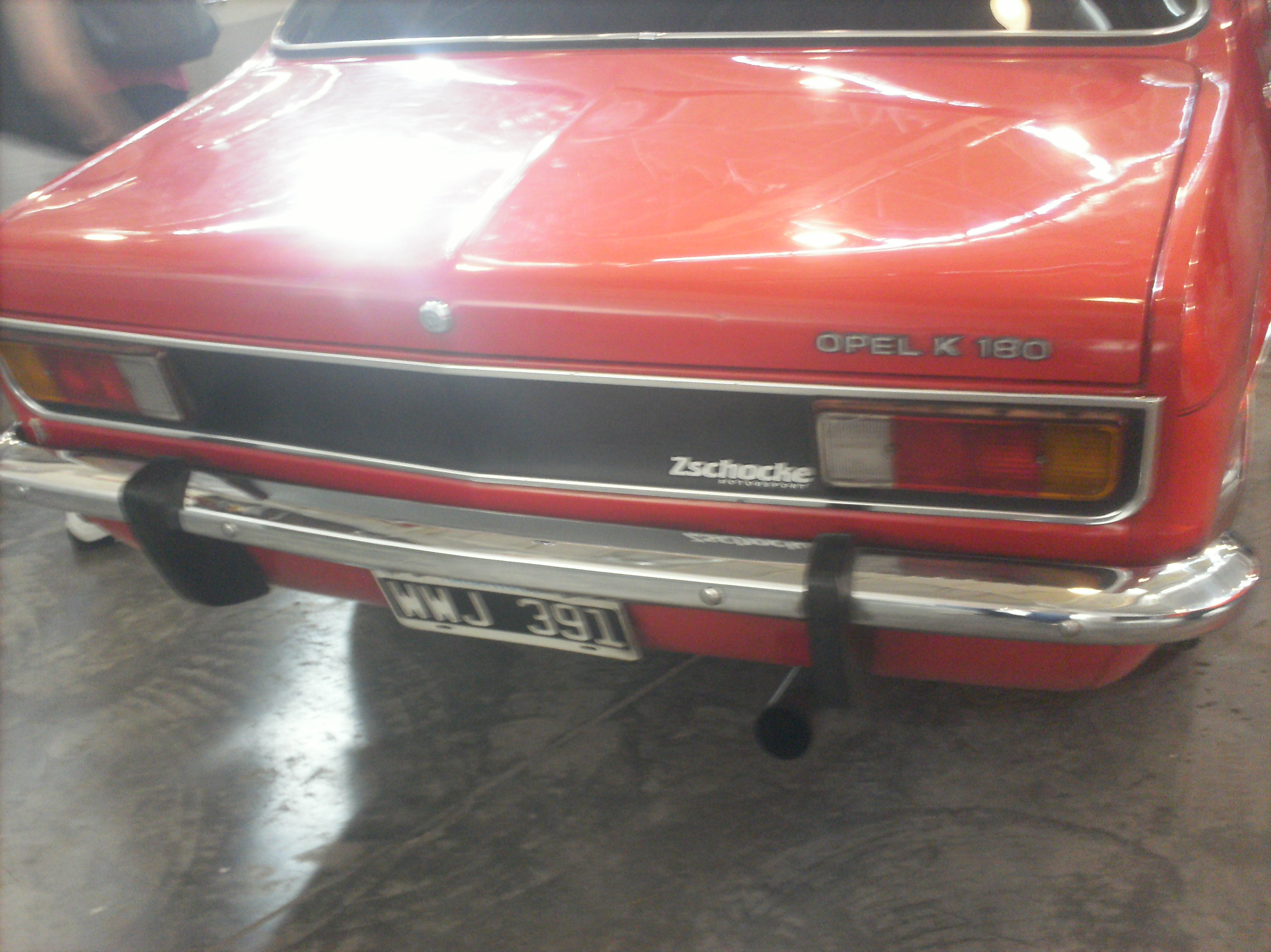
Opel K 180 (rear view)

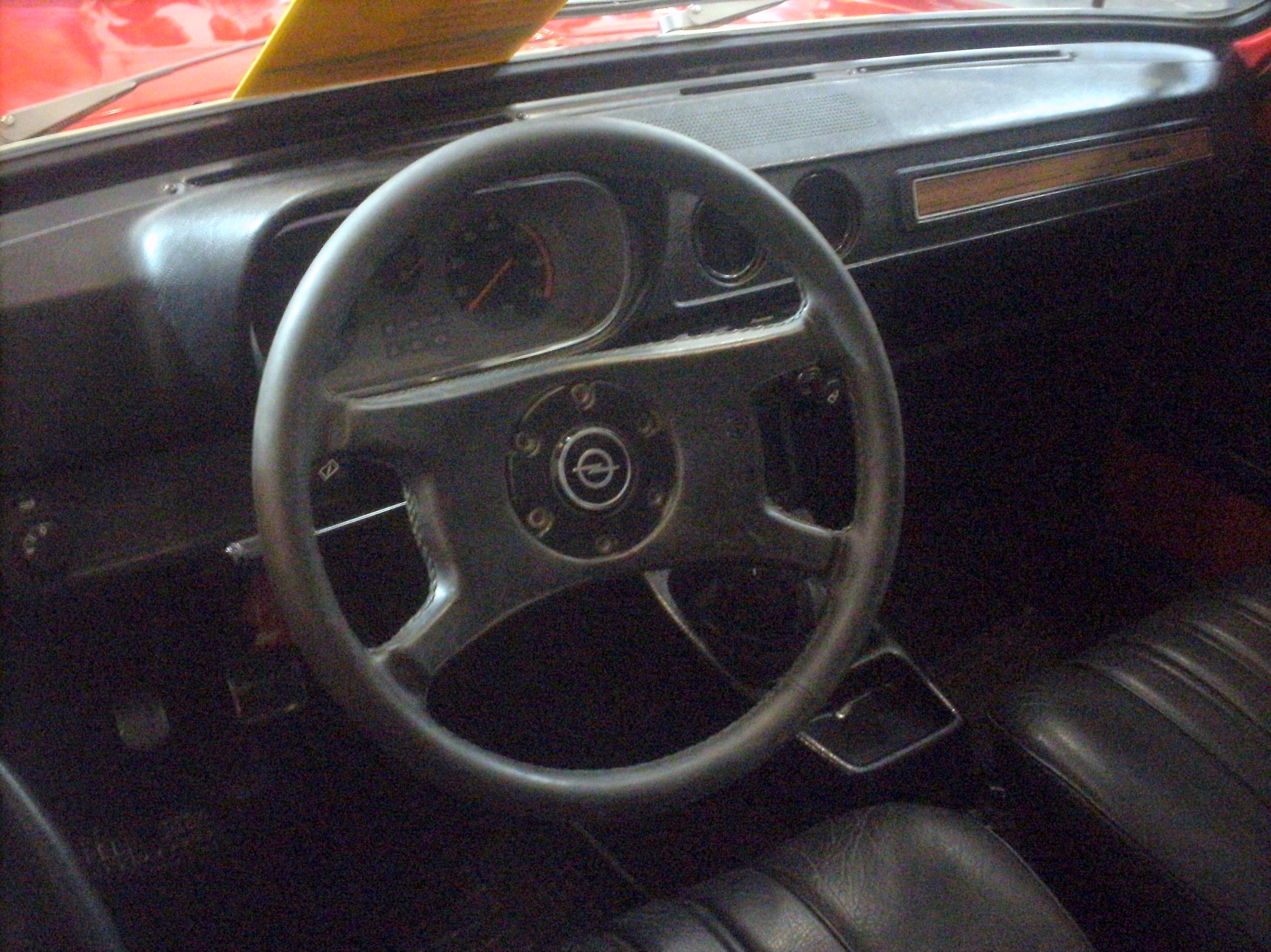
Interior

== Related ==
- Opel Kadett – (Germany)
- Vauxhall Chevette / Bedford Chevanne – (United Kingdom)
- Holden Gemini – (Australia)
- Chevrolet Chevette – (Brazil)
- Chevrolet Chevette / Pontiac T1000 / Pontiac Acadian – (United States)
- Daewoo Maepsy – (South Korea)
- Isuzu Gemini / Buick Opel – (Japan)
