= Chevrolet Chevette =

Front-engine, rear-drive subcompact built 1976–1987

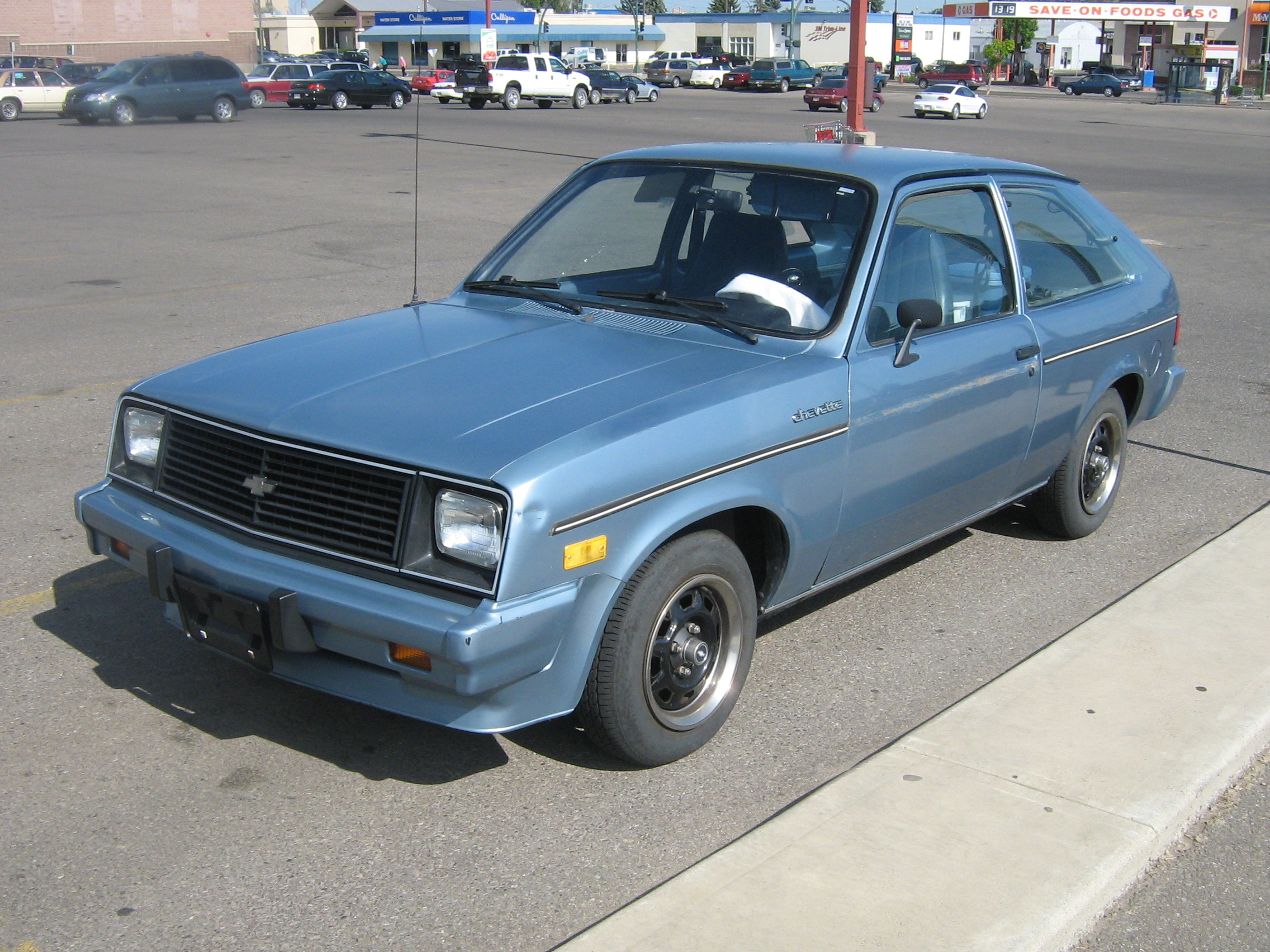
- 1983–1987 Chevrolet Chevette 3-door hatchback

Overview
- Manufacturer: Chevrolet (General Motors)
- Also called: Pontiac Acadian (Canada); Pontiac T1000/1000
- Production: August 15, 1975 – December 23, 1986
- Model years: 1976–1987
- Assembly: United States: Wilmington, Delaware (Wilmington Assembly); United States: Atlanta, Georgia (Lakewood Assembly)

Body and chassis
- Class: Subcompact
- Body style: 3/5-door hatchback
- Layout: FR layout
- Platform: T-body
- Related: Opel Kadett; Isuzu Gemini; Daewoo Maepsy; Vauxhall Chevette; GMC Chevette; Opel K 180; Isuzu Piazza

Powertrain
- Engine: 1,471 cc (89.8 cu in) OHV I4; 1,599 cc (97.6 cu in) OHC I4; 1,817 cc (110.9 cu in) 4FB1 OHC diesel I4
- Transmission: For gasoline models: 4-speed Saginaw manual 5-speed Borg-Warner T-5 manual 3-speed GM Turbo-Hydramatic TH200 (1976–1981); 3-speed GM Turbo-Hydramatic TH180 (1977–1987); For diesel models: 5-speed manual 3-speed GM Turbo-Hydramatic TH200C

Dimensions
- Wheelbase: 2-door: 95.3 in (2,420 mm); 4-door: 97.3 in (2,470 mm) (from 1978)
- Length: 163.8 in (4,161 mm)
- Width: 61.8 in (1,570 mm)
- Height: 52.2 in (1,325 mm)
- Curb weight: 1,843–2,035 lb (836–923 kg)

Chronology
- Successor: Chevrolet Sprint; Chevrolet Metro

The Chevrolet Chevette is a front-engine, rear-drive subcompact manufactured and marketed by Chevrolet for model years 1976–1987 as a three-door or five-door hatchback. Introduced in North America in September 1975, the Chevette superseded the Vega as Chevrolet's entry-level subcompact.

Production reached 2.8 million over 12 years, and the Chevette was the best-selling small car in the U.S. for model years 1979–1980. It was the first American car built to metric measurements, and also the first American car to feature a diagnostic plug for pinpointing service issues.

== Overview ==
The Chevette used General Motors' global rear-drive T platform which was co-developed by Opel and Isuzu in 1973. The first to use the T platform was the Brazilian Chevrolet Chevette released in 1973. Six months later the Opel Kadett C was released in Europe. Worldwide, GM manufactured and marketed more than 7 million T-cars – either as rebadged models or locally-built versions in different countries. T-platform variants were marketed internationally as the Pontiac Acadian in Canada; Pontiac T1000/1000 in the United States (1981–1987); K-180 in Argentina; Vauxhall Chevette in the United Kingdom, Austria, France, Germany, New Zealand, Sweden, and Uruguay; Opel Kadett C in Germany; Isuzu Gemini in Japan, Holden Gemini in Australia; AYMESA Cóndor in Ecuador (from 1978); Saehan Gemini and Daewoo Maepsy in South Korea; and as a coupe utility (pickup), the Chevy (or GMC) 500 in Brazil and South America. A T-platform variant remained in production in South America through 1998.

Introduced with a full-color nationwide campaign in 140–150 of the country's largest daily papers, the New York Times said the "little American car holds its own with the foreigners."

Marketed as "Chevrolet’s New Kind of American Car," the Chevette was of a conventional design: featuring unibody construction, rear-drive and a live rear axle. Looking back on the Chevette in 2011, the New York Times called the Chevette "haphazardly made, sparsely trimmed and underpowered." Consumer Guide described the Chevette as “unimaginative to an extreme.”

== Development ==
Under the direction of chief engineer John Mowrey, Chevrolet began developing the Chevette on December 24, 1973. It was a response to the federal CAFE standards and the 1973 oil crisis. The Chevette was prompted by GM's Energy Task Force, which arose out of the crisis and the resultant shift in consumer demand to smaller, foreign vehicles boasting greater fuel efficiency.

The Chevette was based on GM's World Car, Project 909 – what would become the T-car program, so named because the vehicles shared GM's T platform. With the well-known problems of its predecessor, the Vega, including production, reliability and corrosion issues, the team reworked the international platform for the Chevette, ultimately sharing no actual body panels with other T-platform variants. The underbody was reworked extensively to enhance corrosion protection. The Chevette's 1.4-liter base iron-block engine weighed 59 lb less than the Vega's much-heralded aluminum-block engine. GM reportedly saved 8-12 months in development time by piggybacking the Chevette's development on the T Platform.

The first North American Chevette, a low level trim two-door hatchback marketed as the Chevette Scooter, was assembled on August 18, 1975 and officially introduced on September 16, in Washington, DC, with the first models going on sale on October 2, just after new legislation-mandated Corporate Average Fuel Economy (CAFE) standards. With initial projected sales of 275,000 units in its first year, numbers were cut in half as the price of oil stabilized. Production reached 2,793,353 over its 12 model years 1976–1987. Global T-car sales surpassed 7 million in the end. The last Chevette was manufactured on December 23, 1986, at Lakewood Assembly – following the end of production at Wilmington Assembly in September, 1985. The last Chevette manufactured was a light-blue two-door hatchback shipped to a Chevrolet dealer in Springdale, Ohio.

The T-car had been launched internationally in Brazil under the Chevette name in 1973, as a two-door sedan and ultimately a four-door sedan, a two-door hatchback, and a two-door station wagon (named Marajó), as well as a utility (named the Chevy 500), produced until 1994.

== Initial features and annual updates ==
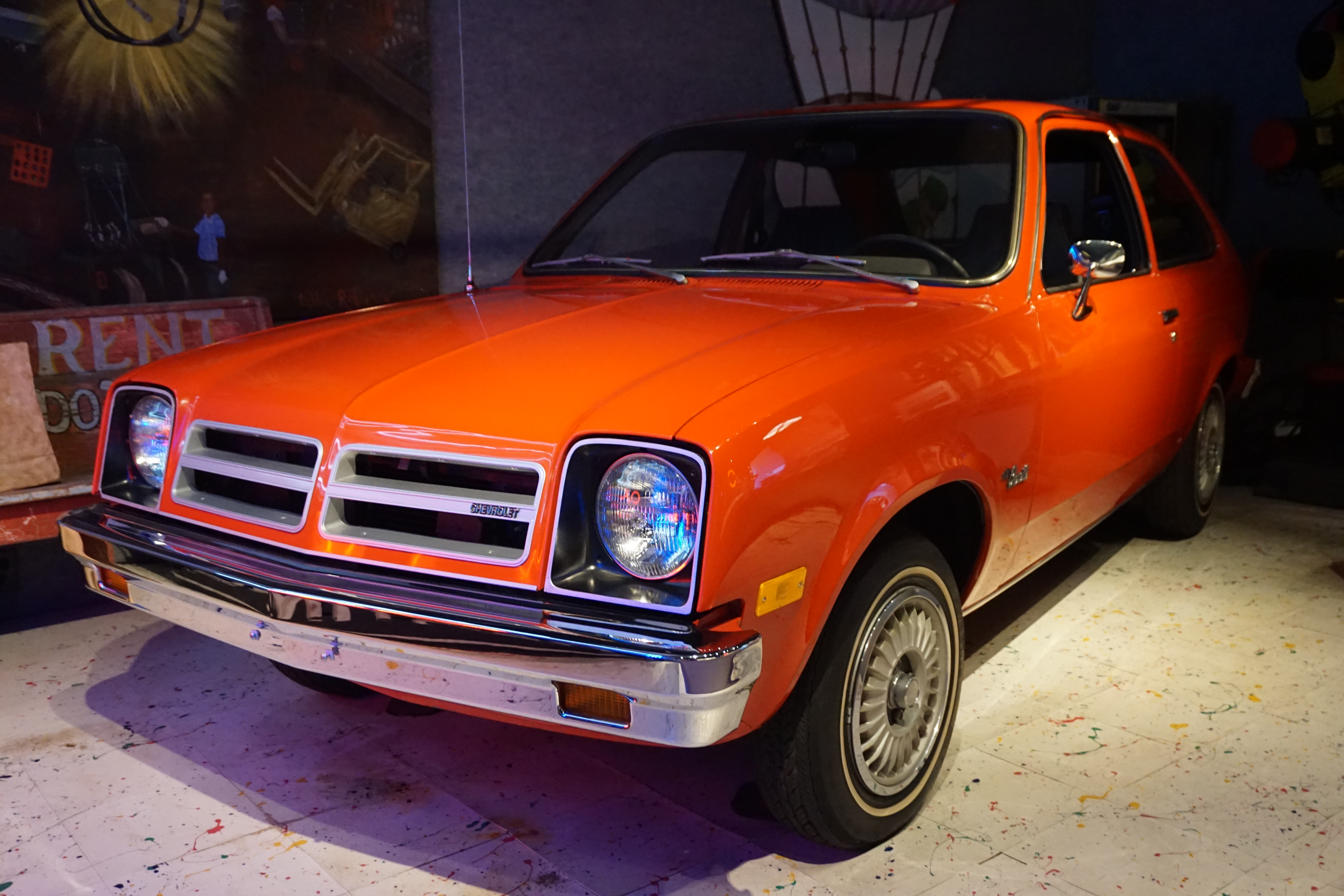
1976 Chevrolet Chevette on display in the Sloan Museum

The Chevette itself was initially available only as a two-door hatchback with a 1.4-liter or 1.6-liter OHV gasoline inline-four engine. Engines produced from 52 to 60 hp (39 to 45 kW), subsequently 53 to 70 hp (40 to 52 kW), driving the rear wheels through a standard four-speed manual transmission. A three-speed automatic transmission was an available option. Other features included rack-and-pinion steering, front disc brakes, front stabilizer bar, 13-inch tires, tricolor taillights, front bucket seats, an onboard diagnostic system, extensive acoustic insulation, a single steering column-mounted stalk (integrating controls for signal indicators, wipers, and windshield washers), and factory options including swing-out rear quarter windows, AM/FM radio, analog clock, delayed wipers, and a chrome "Bright Package". Front seats featured inertia locking mechanisms that enabled entry and exit adjustment of the front seatback without using a separate release.

Canadian model: Pontiac marketed a rebadged variant in Canada as the "Acadian". In addition to being the smallest, most fuel-efficient car marketed by Chevrolet, the Chevette was the lightest car marketed in the U.S. The EPA rated the base 1.4-liter engine at 28 miles per US gallon (8.4 L/100 km; 34 mpg_{‑imp}) city and 40 miles per US gallon (5.9 L/100 km; 48 mpg_{‑imp}) highway. Chevrolet claimed that the Chevette's turning circle (30.2 feet (9.2 m)) was one of the smallest in the world and that it was essentially a "metric" car, "international in design and heritage". The 1976–1978 Chevettes can be identified by round headlights. Chrome-rimmed, tricolor taillights were used from 1976 to 1979.

Rally and Woody trim: the Rally 1.6 included a 1.6-liter (98 cu in) engine in lieu of the 1.4-liter (85 cu in) overhead-cam four-cylinder, rated at 60 hp (45 kW) instead of 52 hp (39 kW), along with a rear stabilizer and special body graphics. The Chevette Woody (1976) featured simulated wood-grain siding and upgraded interior and exterior trim.

Scooter trim: the least expensive Scooter trim carried a $2,899 suggested retail price (equivalent to $16,400 in 2025) and was substantially decontented; equipment included only two front passenger seats and an optional rear seat, deletion of most exterior chrome, painted rather than chrome bumpers, an open glove box, black carpeting, black instrument panel, door-pull straps in lieu of arm rests, fiberboard door panels, fender without antenna accommodation, side and rear decals instead of cast metal emblems, untinted glass and deleted sun visor and passenger seat fore-aft adjustment. The Scooter model created a controversy at introduction, with critics contending the trim level was only marketed to allow a lower advertised price, but without a true intention to sell many. Lee Iacocca subsequently announced Ford would introduce its Pinto Pony MPG model, undercutting the Scooter price by $4 and including a back seat. GM contended the Scooter model was a genuine "urban utility" vehicle, and sold approximately 5% of all production in Scooter trim with 9,810 Scooter models manufactured, compared to 178,007 regular hatchbacks. Ultimately the Scooter competed with other similarly decontented models from competing manufacturers, e.g., the Volkswagen Beetle Type 110, and Dodge Colt Coupe M/M Mileage Maker.

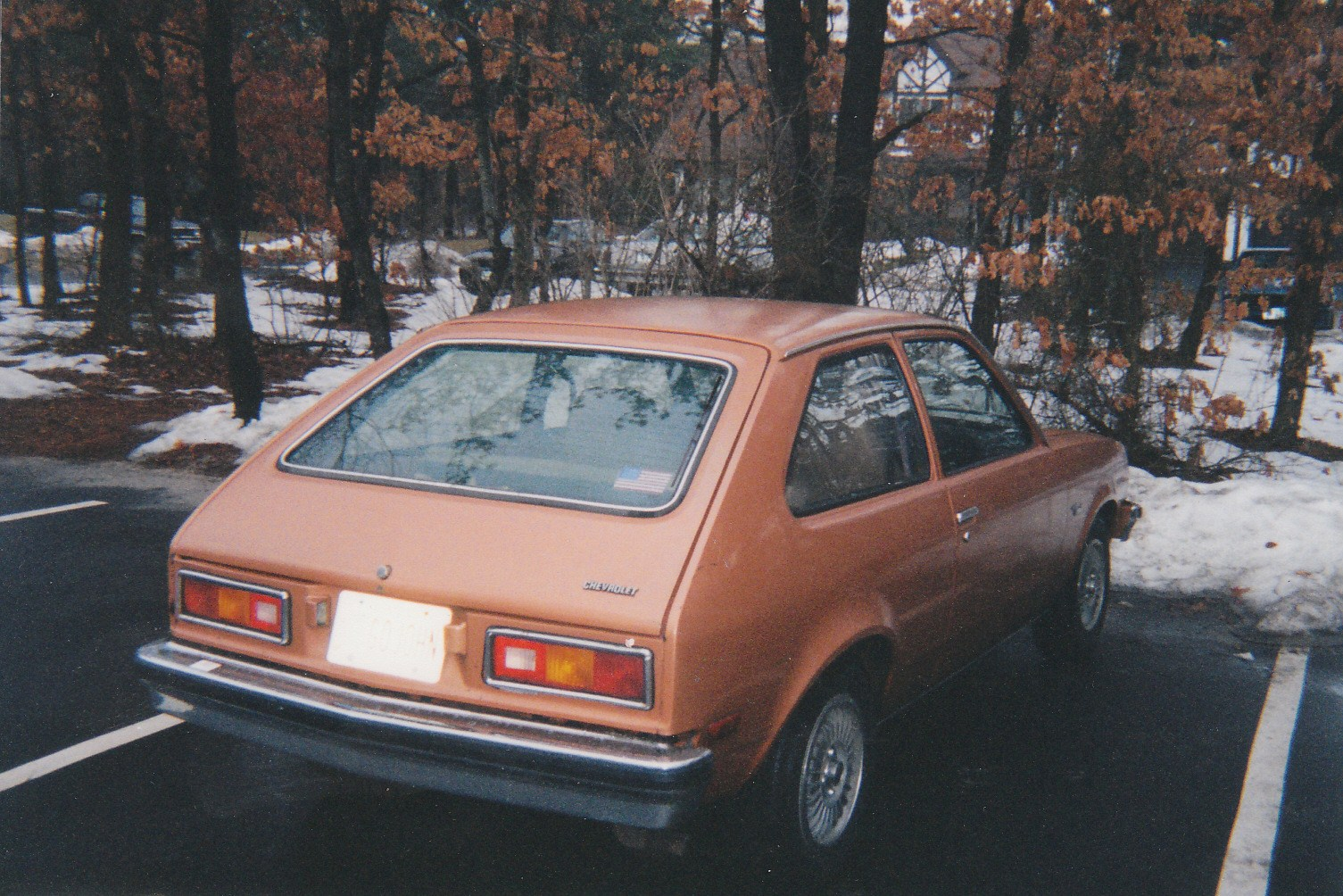
1977 Chevrolet Chevette two-door hatchback

1977: For 1977, the engines were 57 hp (43 kW) and 63 hp (47 kW). The Scooter hatchback included a rear seat, with a rear-seat delete option. The Sandpiper trim package included a “reef”-patterned interior, deluxe door trim, cream gold or antique white exterior colors, and an exterior Sandpiper logo just behind each door.

1978: For 1978, a new four-door hatchback used a 97.3-inch (2,470 mm) wheelbase, two inches longer than the two-door – ultimately accounting for more than half of the Chevette's nearly 300,000 sales. All models featured a revised grille with a grid design, while the chrome grille and headlight frames became standard. The 1.4-liter engine and Woody package were dropped with a fuel door added. A TH-180 automatic transmission was added to replace the THM-200 series automatic. An "HO" (high output) version was available in addition to the standard 1.6-liter, featuring a modified head and a larger valves-cam profile. The HO package also included a dual-outlet exhaust manifold. Prices were dropped and more standard equipment was added for 1978. Air conditioning, radial tires, an AM/FM radio, and power brakes were optional.

1979: For 1979, the Holley two-barrel carburetor became standard on all models. The front fascia was revised with a flat hood, no longer wrapping down to the bumper. New for 1979 was a large chrome grille with Chevrolet's "bow-tie" emblem and rectangular headlights. A new air-injection system was introduced to improve catalytic-converter function at idle. An active passenger-restraint system was introduced in small numbers as an option which featured a lower hanging dashboard, automatic seatbelts, and a center-dash console. Chevette sales totaled more than 451,000 units – a figure that would rank it second only to Chevrolet's new Citation, which had a much longer model run (sales had started in April 1979). Consumer Guide testers managed "an honest 29 mpg in the city and 39 mpg on the highway".

1980: For MY 1980 rear fascia was revised with a squared-off hatch, wraparound taillights with combined, single-colored turn signals, and a round gas-filler door. Unable to comply with U.S. emissions requirements, GM engineers GM requested and received an EPA waiver of the 1981 and 1982 carbon monoxide standards (waiver 45 FR 49877–49900), noting that catalytic converter and air pump for the 1.6-liter carbureted four-cylinder engine could not meet the impending standard, and that the company faced prohibitive hardship if the waiver wasn't granted to allow more time to comply.

1981 In August 1981, a diesel engine option was new with a late 1981 availability – this is a 1.8-liter Isuzu unit only available coupled to an Isuzu five-speed. The 51 hp (38 kW) powertrain is the same as was installed in the Isuzu I-Mark. It was not available with air conditioning. New styled-steel wheels with center caps were offered, and the previous wheel and hubcap design was discontinued. Domestic models received a new computer command control feedback system on gasoline engines. The HO option was discontinued. Electronic spark timing was used on 1981 models in place of mechanical timing advance. A new engine cylinder head design (swirl-port) was introduced to improve low-end torque and fuel economy. The Pontiac T1000 was introduced in the spring of 1981 for both the U.S. and Canadian markets, which shared all body stampings with the Chevette, featuring a chrome center with black-trimmed grille and headlight buckets, as well as standard chrome window trim with black area fill. The T1000 also had additional fresh-air vents at the outer ends of the dashboard. This gave Canadian Pontiac dealers 2 versions of the T-car: the Acadian and the T1000 (later, simply "1000") concurrently from 1981 to 1985. Power steering was a new option for the Chevette, as well as a 3.36 axle ratio (standard on T1000 models). The active passenger-restraint system was discontinued. New lighter-weight bucket seats were introduced that lacked much of the lower support of the heavier "panned" seats. A new adhesive-based, thinner windshield seal replaced the lock-ring type.

1982: For MY 1982, models featured a five-speed manual transmission option on gasoline-powered two-door cars (standard with diesel). The Scooter was newly available as a four-door hatchback. New GM THM-180C (THM200C for diesel model) automatic transmissions, which included a locking torque converter for greater fuel mileage, were available. Introduction of a pump-driven AIR system in the late model year replaced PAIR to help efficiency of the catalytic converter. A new catalytic converter was introduced with an air inlet for forced air injection from the air pump. A new one-piece cardboard-based headliner with an updated overhead dome light replaced the earlier vinyl liner. The Pontiac T1000 received a unique grille, body molding, and horizontal lined taillights, as well as an alloy sport wheel option. General Motors of Canada's Pontiac Acadian, a rebadged Chevette, received all the T1000's Pontiac-exclusive features from this point on. Chevrolet sold 433,000 Chevettes in 1981 and 233,000 in 1982.

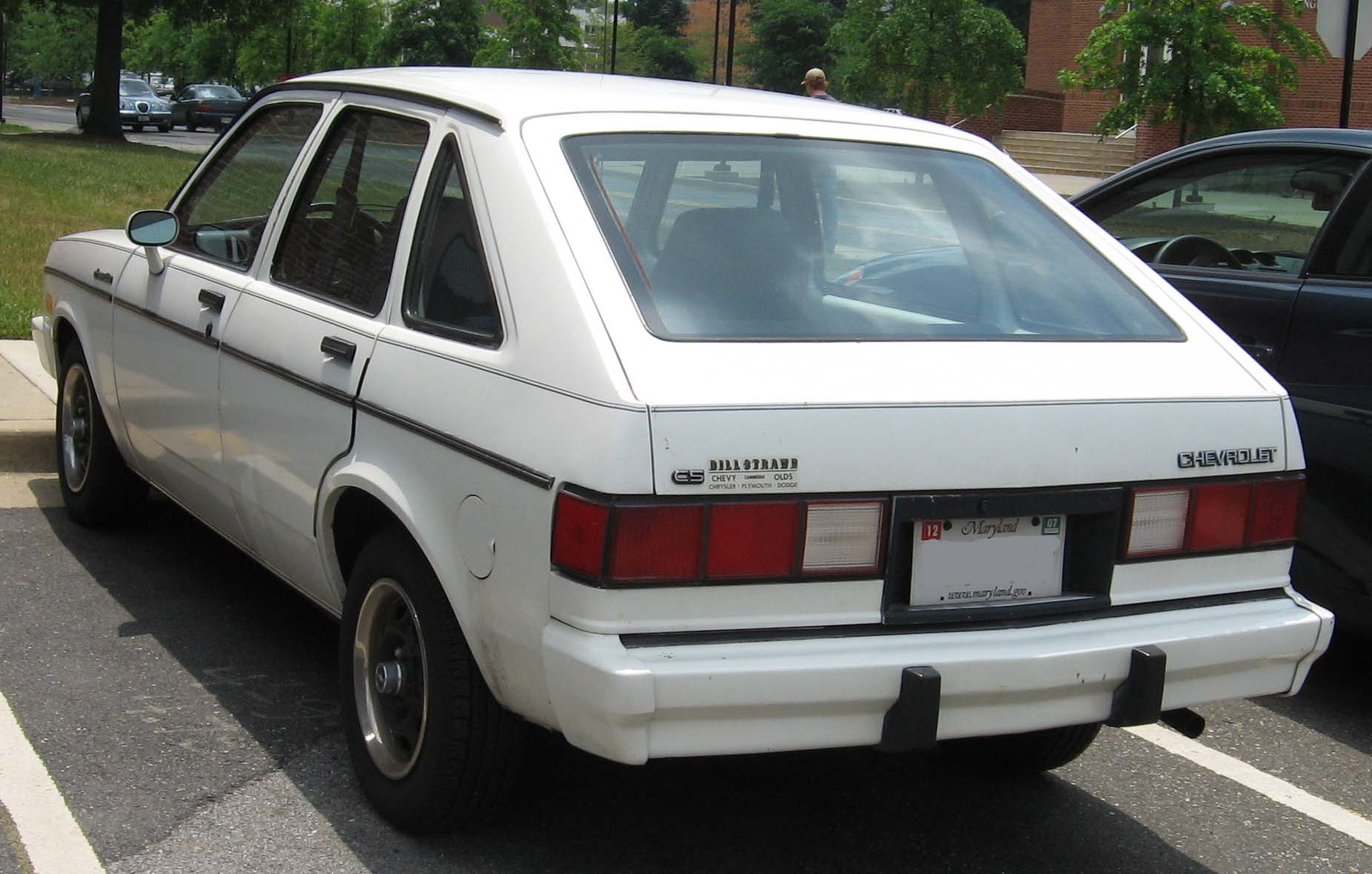
The revised rear of a 1983 Chevette CS, with larger, blockier taillight units

1983: For MY 1983, the Chevette featured revised front and rear fascia, and the Chevette CS was introduced. A black-finished grille and trim moldings replaced most chrome pieces. Scooter and base Chevettes featured black bumpers and end caps, while the higher-end Chevette CS models included color-keyed bumpers and caps with chrome bumper inserts as an option. Scooter and base models featured a black-only grille and headlight buckets, while CS models featured argent-colored trim. The Chevette S model introduced a cosmetic package that included black-painted styled-steel wheels and a red-accented grille and moldings, as well as oversized decal emblems in red. Front bucket seats featured new adjustable knobs on the sides, but lost the reclining levers of previous years. Interior trim was also blacked out with new black door handles and black plastic window regulators. An integrated cassette deck was optional with the stereo package. A chrome strip on the dashboard was available only on CS and S models until the end of production. Deluxe door panels were discontinued and all models featured plastic door panels, but base and Scooter models still featured laminated cardboard cargo area panels. The "diagnostic connector" was removed from the wiring harness.

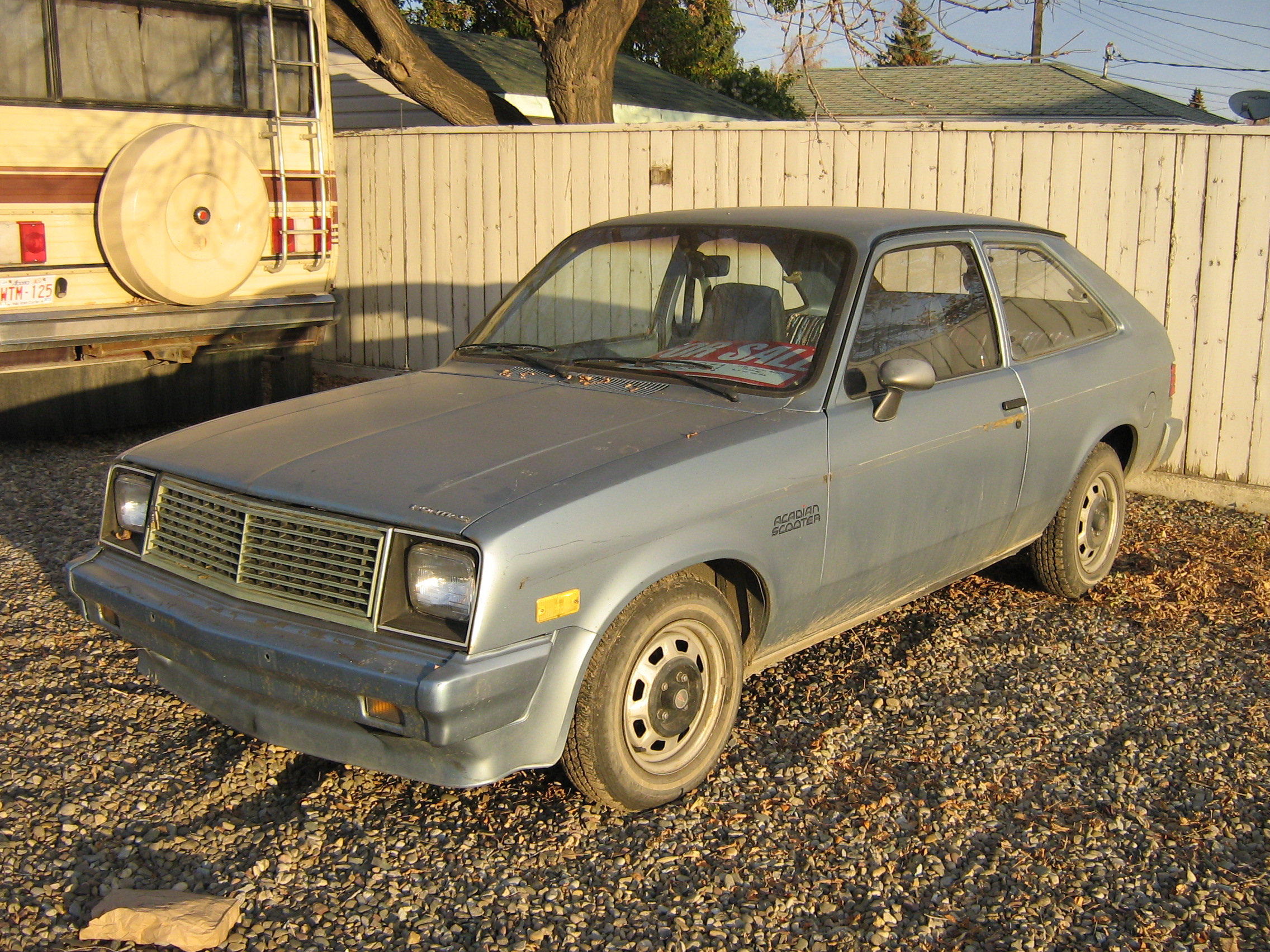
1986 Pontiac Acadian Scooter two-door hatchback

1984: For MY 1984, the low-cost Scooter model was discontinued for the US and retained for Canadian production. The T1000 was renamed Pontiac 1000 in 1983 both in the U.S. and Canada.

1985: MY 1985 models carried few updates from the 1984 models.

1986: For MY 1986, the Chevette base model was discontinued, leaving only the CS and the S, which featured a third brake light, an instrument cluster "service engine soon" light, replacing the "check engine" light, and a new bowtie emblem on the front grille.

1987: For MY 1987, Chevrolet dropped the Chevette S model and the diesel engine option (after 324 were sold in 1986, plus 264 diesel-engined Pontiac 1000). These were the last North American market General Motors diesel passenger cars built for many decades, following the discontinuation of the Oldsmobile Diesel engine. The Chevette's price was also dropped to $4,995. Sales fell to just over 46,000 units, and production ended on December 23, 1986.

Chevrolet Chevette production figures
| | 3-door hatch | 5-door hatch | Total |
|---|---|---|---|
| 1976 | 187,817 | - | 187,817 |
| 1977 | 133,469 | - | 133,469 |
| 1978 | 131,204 | 180,598 | 311,802 |
| 1979 | 160,244 | 208,865 | 369,109 |
| 1980 | 187,684 | 261,477 | 449,161 |
| 1981 | 169,832 | 250,616 | 420,448 |
| 1982 | 87,586 | 145,222 | 232,808 |
| 1983 | 71,464 | 98,101 | 169,565 |
| 1984 | 115,973 | 127,927 | 243,900 |
| 1985 | 57,909 | 65,590 | 123,499 |
| 1986 | 48,880 | 54,364 | 103,244 |
| 1987 | 26,135 | 20,073 | 46,208 |
| Total | 1,378,197 | 1,412,833 | 2,791,030 |

== Electrovette ==
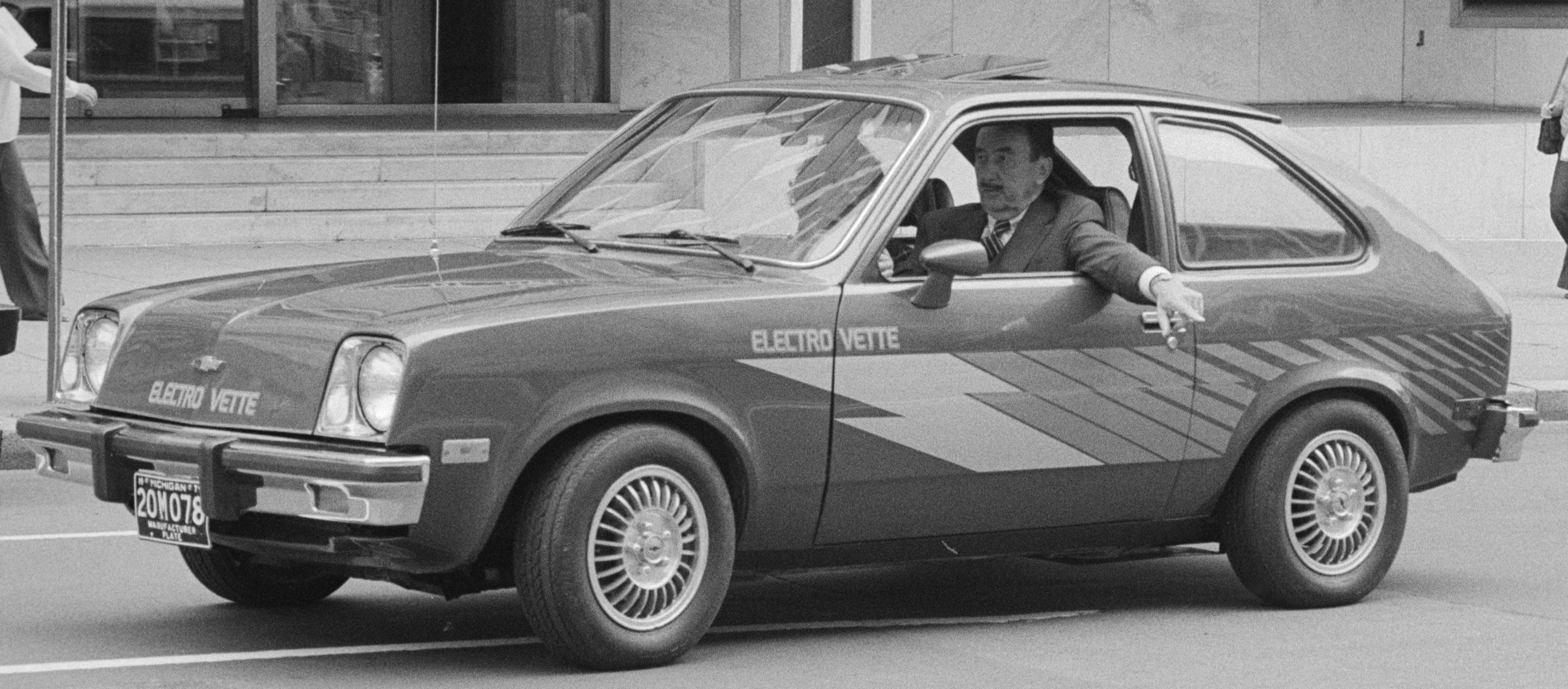
A man driving the Chevrolet Electrovette in 1979

In 1978, General Motors Advanced Engineering developed a concept car, the Electrovette, based on the Chevette, but using an electric motor powered by a Delco-Remy nickel-zinc battery pack. It was a strict two-seater and sat on a shortened wheelbase, with the batteries mounted in the rear. The car had a range of about 50 mi (80 km) at 30 mph (48 km/h), and a top speed of 53 mph (85 km/h).

== Leata Cabalero ==
A luxury variant of the Chevette, the Leata Cabalero, was manufactured and marketed for model years 1976 and 1977 by Stinebaugh Manufacturing Company, founded by Donald E. Stinebaugh (1916–1992) with his son Leonard D. "Sonny" Stinebaugh (1946–2001) in Post Falls, Idaho. Donald Stinebaugh named the car after his wife Hilda (Erickson) Stinebaugh, giving the car her nickname, Leata – a misspelling of lita, Norwegian for "little" in feminine form.

The Leata featured power windows, power seat and cruise control – as well as baroque styling with custom fiberglass body panels, round headlights in square bezels, a rectangular "classic" grille, and heavily styled fenders; 97 were made either in pickup or hatchback body styles.

== Latin America ==
Chevrolet Chevette
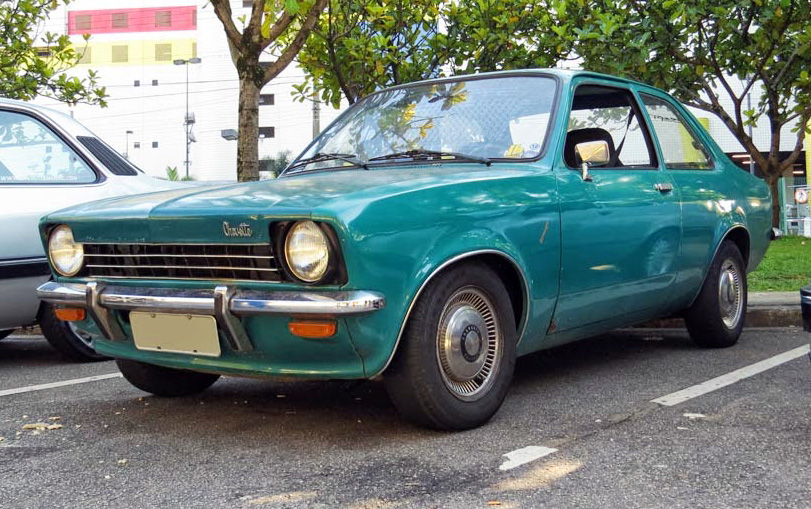
- Early Brazilian Chevette

Overview
- Also called: Chevrolet Marajó (station wagon); Chevy 500 (pickup); Chevrolet San Remo (Ecuador & Venezuela); GMC Chevette (Argentina)
- Production: April 24, 1973 – November 12, 1993 (Brazil); 1983–1995 (Brazil; Chevy 500); 1976–1983 (Chile); 1983–1996 (Ecuador); 1982–1998 (Colombia)
- Assembly: Brazil: São José dos Campos; Chile: Arica; Colombia: Bogotá (GM Colmotores); Ecuador: Quito (Aymesa); Uruguay: Montevideo; Venezuela: Valencia

Body and chassis
- Class: Compact car / Small family car (C)
- Body style: 3-door hatchback 2/4-door sedan 3-door station wagon 2-door coupé utility
- Layout: FR layout
- Platform: T-body

Powertrain
- Engine: 998 cc I4; 1398 cc I4; 1599 cc I4; 1817 cc 4FB1 diesel I4
- Transmission: 4/5-speed manual; 3-speed TH180 automatic (option, 1.6 L only)

Dimensions
- Wheelbase: 2,395 mm (94.3 in)
- Length: 4,161 mm (163.8 in) (1985 sedans); 3,961 mm (155.9 in) (1985 HB); 4,197 mm (165.2 in) (1985 Marajó)
- Width: 1,570 mm (61.8 in) (1985)
- Height: 1,325 mm (52.2 in) (1985); 1,385 mm (54.5 in) (1985 Marajó)
- Curb weight: 836–923 kg (1,843–2,035 lb) (1985)

Chronology
- Successor: Chevrolet Corsa; Chevrolet Kadett/Ipanema

The Chevrolet Chevette was first launched by General Motors (Brazil) in 1973 as a two-door sedan. A four-door sedan followed in April 1978, and then a three-door hatchback was added in November 1979. The hatchback had unique bodywork for Latin America, longer than the European Kadett City and with a notch at the base à la the period Ford Escort. A three-door station wagon version, called the Marajó in Brazil, was added in September 1980, as was a sporting version of the hatchback called the 1.6 SR (with a mere four more horsepower, achieved by a somewhat higher compression ratio). In 1983, the Chevette received a thorough facelift with rectangular headlights, with the turn signals located underneath the headlights, a flatter hood, and a single-piece grille. The dash was also new, as were ventilation windows in the front doors. Mechanically, the 1.6 was now also available to run on gasoól and a five-speed manual gearbox was available as an option.

The Latin American Chevettes underwent a series of facelifts, in 1978, 1983, and a major one in 1987, which meant new headlights and a black plastic grille. Where available, the station wagon used the Chevette name outside of Brazil.

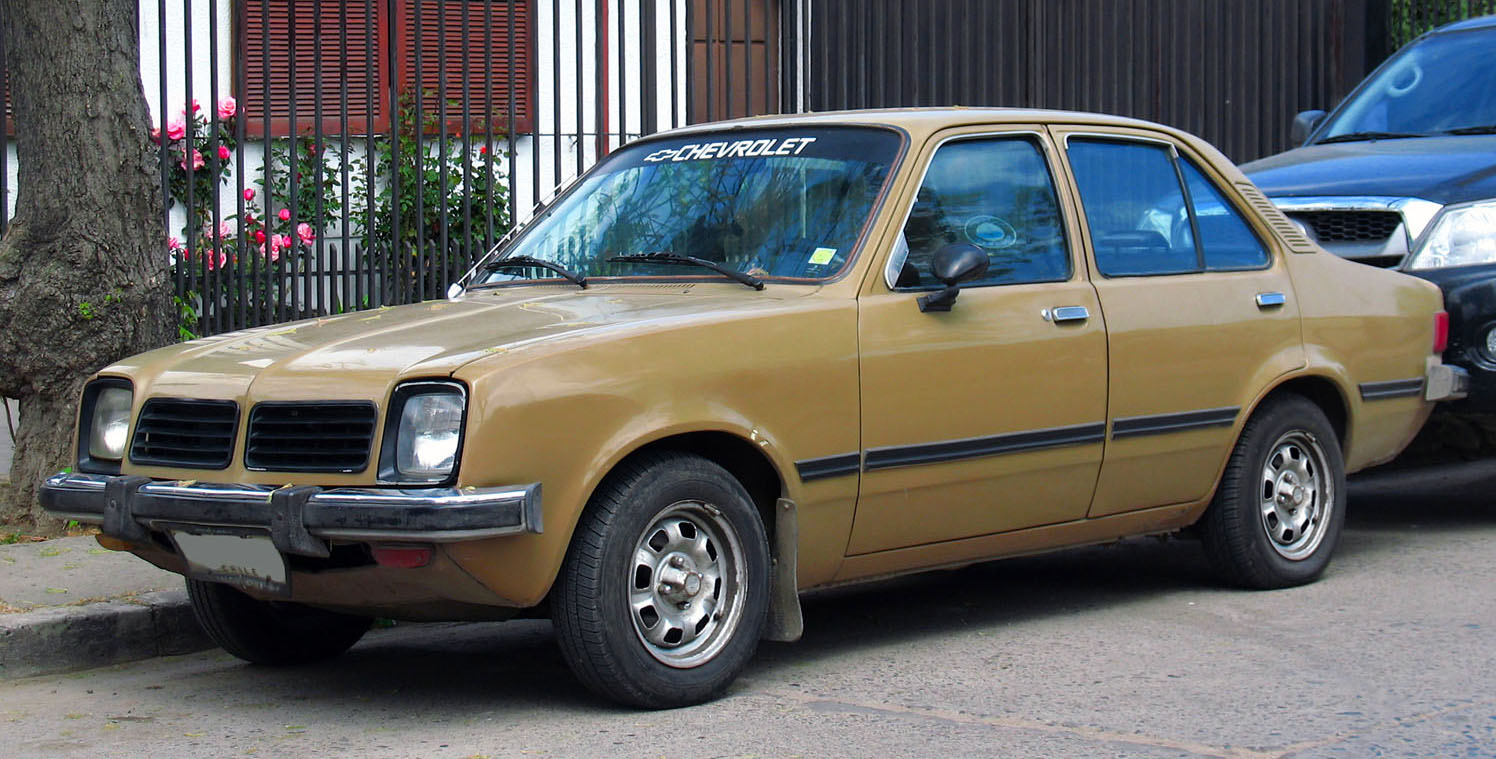
Brazilian-built Chevette SL sedan, 1981

The hatchback remained in production until 1988, while the Marajó continued to be available until 1989. Marajó is an island located at the mouth of the Amazon River in Brazil. The four-door sedan version was built until 1989, mainly for export to other Latin American countries. The two-door sedan remained in production until 1993, only outlived by the pickup version (Chevy 500), which continued until 1994 after having been first launched in 1983. The four-door sedan continued to be built for a few more years in Ecuador, Colombia and Venezuela.

The Chevette originally appeared with a 1.4-liter single overhead cam inline-four. In 1981 this was augmented by a locally developed 1.6-liter version, it too with a single carburetor. The Brazilian 1.4 and 1.6 were similar to but not the same as the EPA compliant North American 1.4 and 1.6. For 1988, the 1.6 gained a twin-carb setup and now produced 78 PS (57 kW) rather than the 72 PS (53 kW) in earlier version. This engine remained available until the end of Brazilian Chevette production. The lower-powered 1.4 was only available for gasohol as of 1981 and was discontinued entirely after 1982. A gasohol-powered version of the 1.6 appeared in its stead for 1983.

As a tax cut for sub-1-liter cars appeared in late 1990, General Motors do Brasil responded with the 1.0-litre "Chevette Junior" for early 1992. This used a narrow-bore, short-stroke 50 PS (37 kW) version of the OHC engine with a catalytic converter. The Junior did not do particularly well in the market, competing against the much more modern Fiat Uno Mille, Volkswagen Gol, and Ford Escort Hobby. Being rather underpowered and heavy at 865 kg (1,907 lb), with a top speed of 134 km/h (83 mph), the 1.0 had a brief sales life. It only remained available until 1993, after which the Corsa took over. A 1.8-liter Isuzu diesel-engined version was also built in Uruguay, exclusively for the Uruguayan market. In the Brazilian market, both the 1.4 and the 1.6 were available in gasoline and alcohol versions.

In Argentina, the Kadett C was originally marketed as the Opel K-180, but between 1992 and 1995, the equivalent of the Brazilian Chevette was sold there as the GMC Chevette. Production in Colombia, where a special version for taxi usage was also built, continued until 1998. The Chevette was the number-one seller in Chile for some time, last in 1991. The Chevette was made locally in Chile in 2-door and 4-door form from 1976 to 1983 while the Marajo station wagon was always imported from Brazil as was the Chevy 500 pickup. After 1983, all Chevettes in Chile were imported from Brazil. When catalytic converters were made a requirement in that country, GMB was unable to develop such an engine and the Chevette was withdrawn from the Chilean market after the 1992 model year.

Around 1.6 million units were built in Brazil, with the Corsa replacing the Junior and the Chevrolet Kadett/Ipanema replacing the bigger-engined versions. About one quarter of the production was exported.

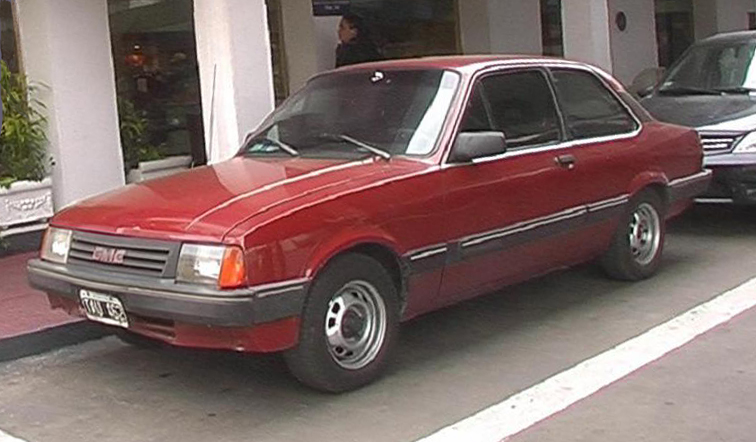
GMC Chevette two-door (Argentina)

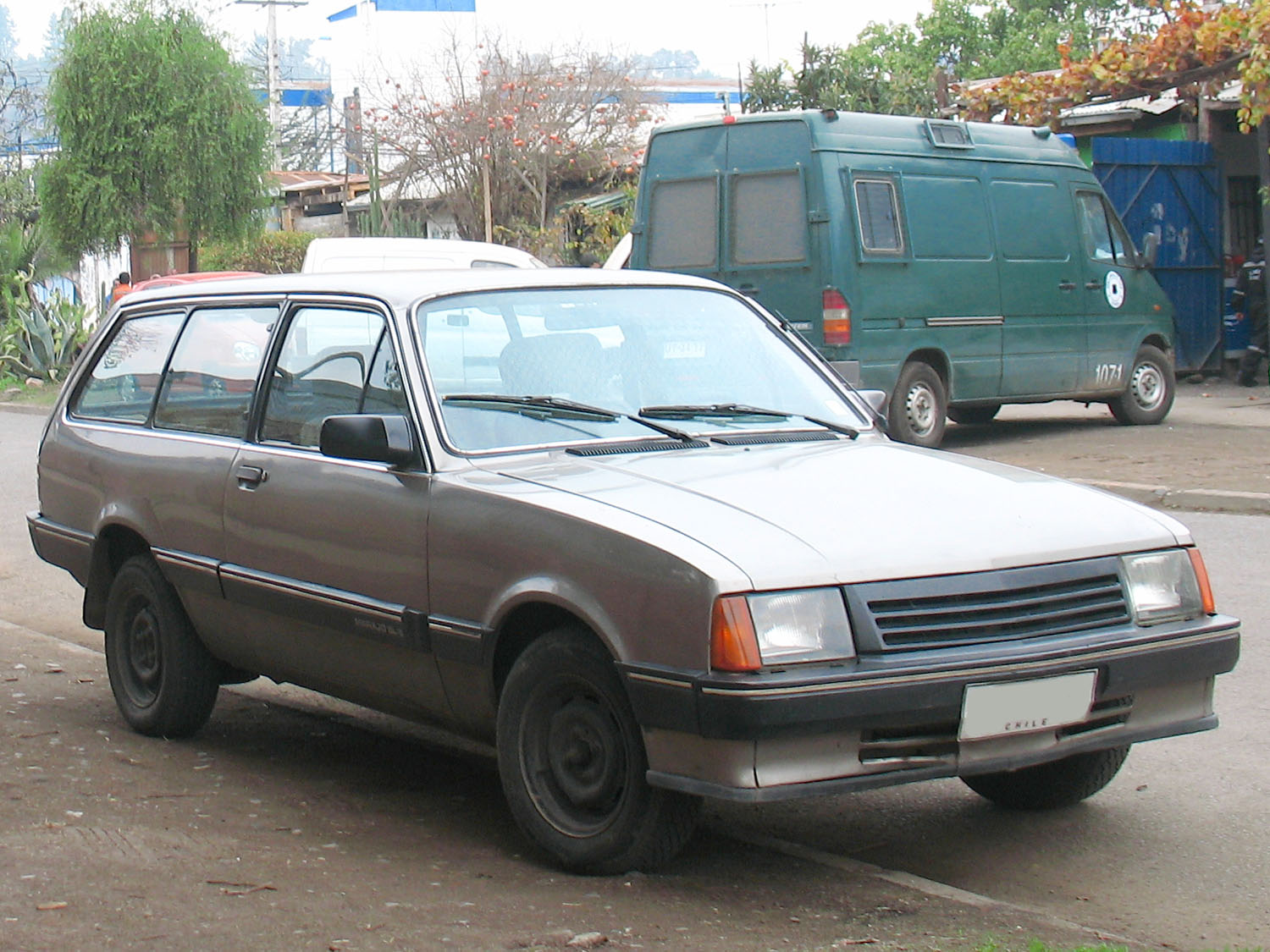
1989 Marajó 1.6 SL/E

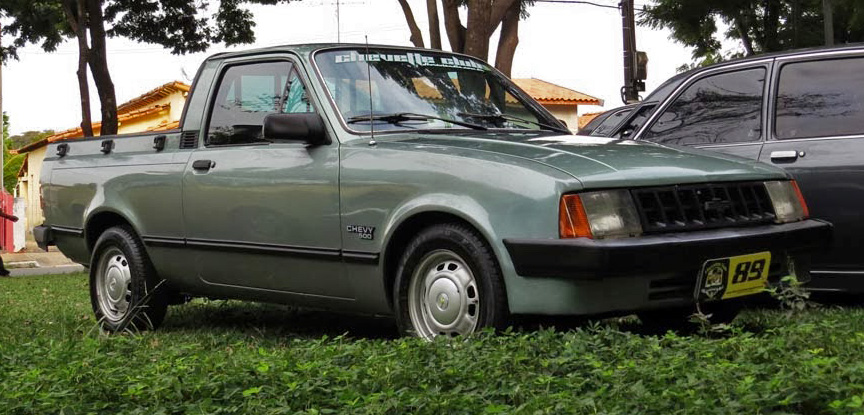
Chevrolet Chevy 500, late facelift version

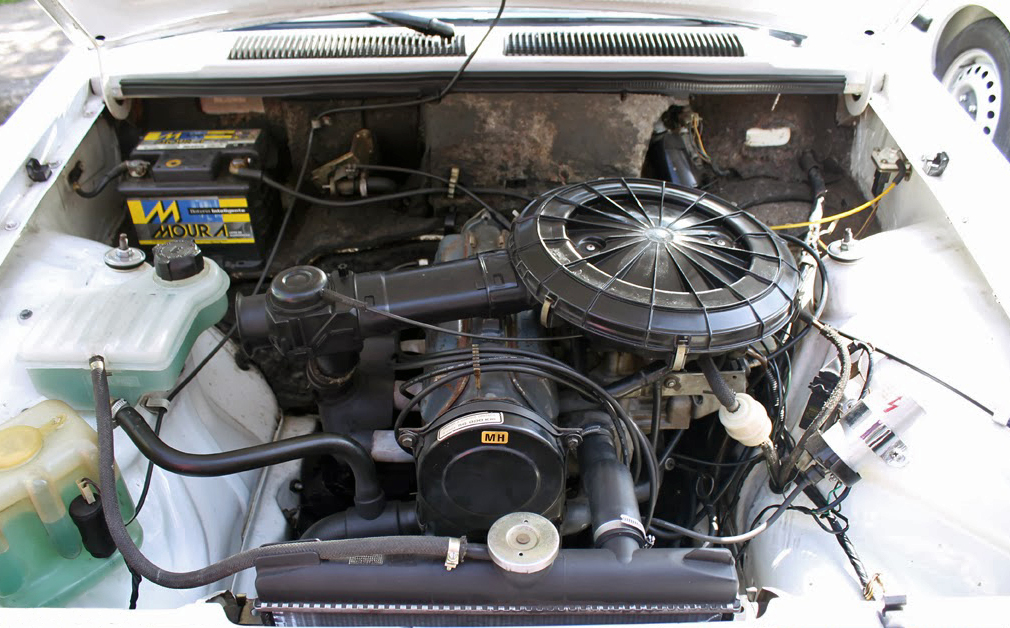
Brazilian 1.6-litre OHC engine

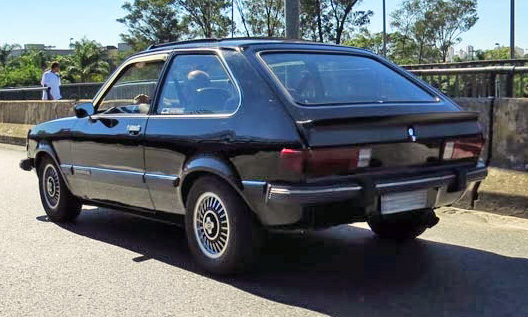
A unique hatchback version was also developed by GM do Brasil

=== Chevy 500 ===
The Chevrolet Chevy 500 was the coupé utility version of the Brazilian Chevette. Launched in 1983, it was the precursor to the Classic/Corsa/Montana lineup of today. It competed with offerings from several other manufacturers, including the Fiat Fiorino, Ford Pampa, and Volkswagen Saveiro. Its payload was 500 kg (1,100 lb). Using the 1.6-liter OHC inline four rated at 70 hp, this model continued in production until 1994, and was the last Chevette version built in Brazil, where it was replaced by the coupé utility version of Chevrolet Corsa.

=== Grumett ===
Created by Horacio Torrendell, a fibreglass-bodied version (actually based on the Vauxhall Chevette's bodywork) called the Grumett was built in Uruguay. It was available either as a station wagon, as a pickup, a coupe, or as a double-cab pickup. This replaced an earlier version (since 1976) which used bodywork based on that of the Vauxhall Viva, as well as Vauxhall mechanics. By 1980 the Vauxhall parts had become impossible to import and Grumett switched to Chevette parts from Brazil. The Grumett used the original 1.4-liter version of the Chevette engine. The regular Chevette was also assembled in Uruguay, by General Motors Uruguaya. It was sold there as a two- or four-door sedan, either with the 1.4 petrol or the 1.8 diesel.
