= GMC Chevette =

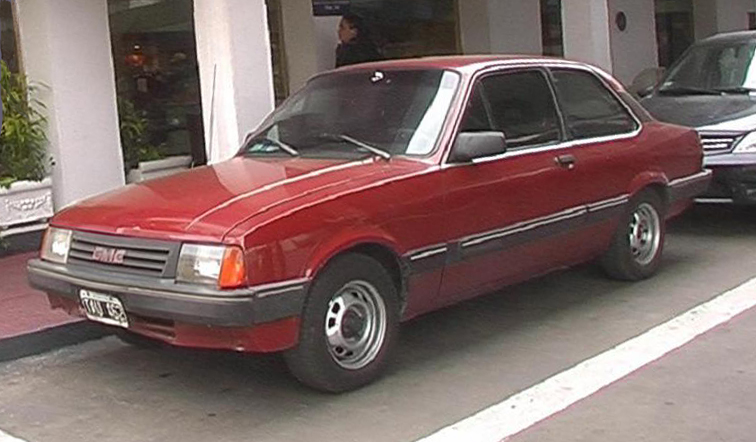
- GMC Chevette 2 door sedan

Overview
- Manufacturer: General Motors do Brasil
- Also called: GMC 500 (pickup)
- Production: 1992–1995
- Assembly: Brazil: São Caetano do Sul

Body and chassis
- Class: Small family car (C)
- Body style: 2/4-door sedan 2-door coupé utility (GMC 500)

Powertrain
- Engine: 1.6L I4 (petrol); 1.8L Isuzu I4 (diesel)
- Transmission: 5-speed manual

Chronology
- Predecessor: Opel K 180
- Successor: Chevrolet Corsa

The GMC Chevette is a small family car which was manufactured from 1992 to 1995 by General Motors do Brasil specifically for the Argentine market, where it was sold by both Chevrolet and Renault dealers. This was the result of a deal having been made whereby Argentine CIADEA-made Renault Trafics were sold as "Chevrolets" in Brazil in return for GM do Brasil being allowed to export Chevettes to Argentina.

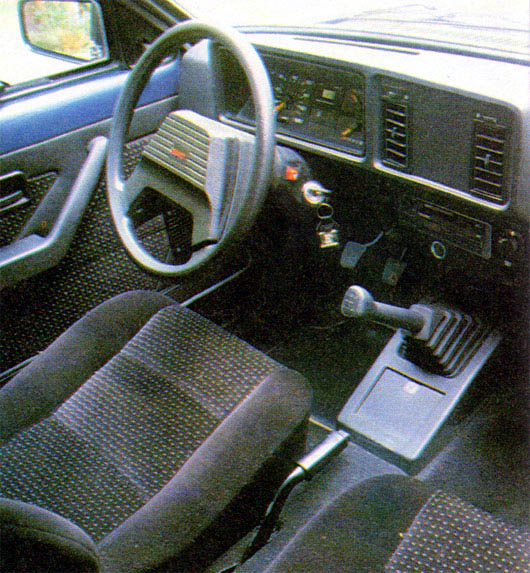
Interior of a 1992 Chevette

The Chevette was a variation of the General Motors T-car platform which includes Opel Kadett, Chevrolet Chevette and Isuzu Gemini. Offered as a 2-door sedan and as a 4-door sedan, it was powered by a 1.6-liter overhead camshaft engine with a 1.8-liter Isuzu diesel engine available as an option. A pickup version of the Chevette was sold in Argentina as the GMC 500.

The Chevette was the only sedan car to be badged as a GMC. (In North America, the GMC brand solely marketed light duty and heavy duty trucks until the late 2000s when the company added crossovers.) It was replaced in the Argentine market by the Chevrolet Corsa in 1995.

== Similar models ==
- Chevrolet Chevette
- Vauxhall Chevette
- Isuzu Gemini
- Holden Gemini
- Daewoo Maepsy
- Opel Kadett C
