= Daewoo Maepsy =

South Korean compact car

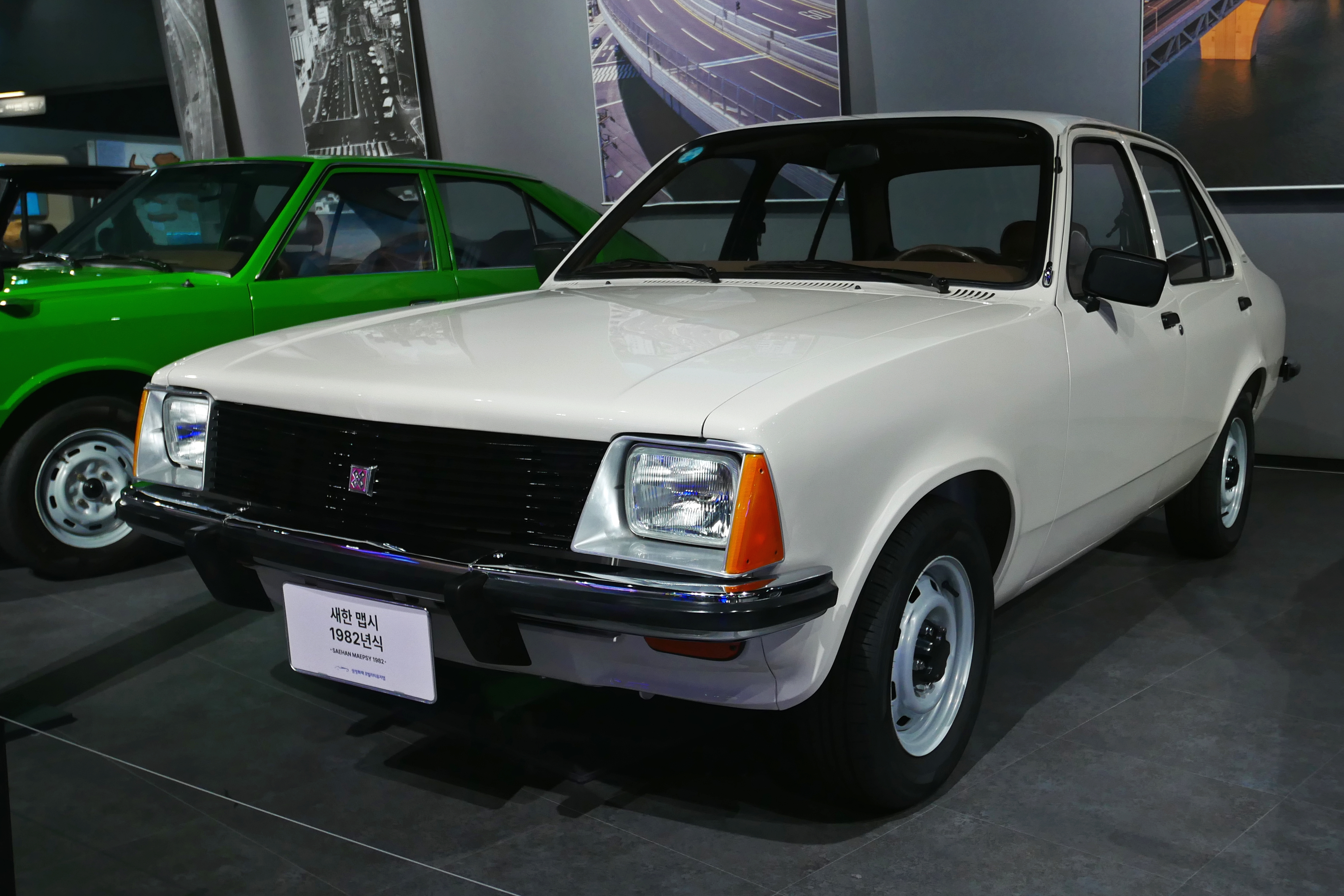

Overview
- Manufacturer: Daewoo
- Also called: Saehan Gemini (1977–1982); Saehan Bird (export); Saehan Maepsy (1982–1983); Daewoo Maepsy-Na (1983–1986); Daewoo Maepsy Sigma (LPG, 1986–1989); Saehan Max (pickup, 1978–1983); Daewoo Max (pickup, 1983–1988)
- Production: December 1977 – July 1986 (until February 1989 for taxi usage); August 1979 – May 1988 (pickup)
- Assembly: South Korea: Bupyeong

Body and chassis
- Body style: 2-door pickup truck; 4-door sedan
- Layout: FR layout
- Related: Isuzu Gemini; Chevrolet Chevette; Holden Gemini; Opel Kadett; Vauxhall Chevette

Powertrain
- Engine: 1.3 L Mazda TC I4 (1982–1984); 1.3 L Mazda TC LPG I4 (1982–1984); 1.5 L Opel 15N I4; 1.5 L XQ I4; 1.5 L XQ LPG I4 (1984–1989); 2.0 L Opel 20D diesel I4 (pickup)
- Transmission: 4-speed manual 3-speed automatic

Chronology
- Predecessor: Saehan Camina
- Successor: Daewoo LeMans

The Daewoo Maepsy (Korean: 대우 맵시) is a compact car manufactured by Daewoo (and its predecessor Saehan) in South Korea from December 1977 to February 1989. The Maepsy was a rebadged version of the PF50 Isuzu Gemini (itself a rebadged Opel Kadett C). It was originally sold as the Saehan Gemini (Saehan Bird in export markets); in February 1982 the car became the Saehan Maepsy. In 1983 it was called the Daewoo Maepsy after Saehan Motor was bought out by the Daewoo Group, and after a facelift later that year the car became the Daewoo Maepsy-Na (New Maepsy, 맵시나). The word "maepsy" means "beautiful" in Korean.

== Design ==
The original Gemini was equipped with a 1492 cc imported four-cylinder engine. Power was 73 PS (54 kW) at 5,400 rpm, for a claimed top speed of 160 km/h (99 mph). This imported engine made the car rather expensive, however, and when the Hyundai Pony was introduced Saehan's market share dropped precipitously. A measure of popularity was retained as the Gemini was the only compact car in South Korea with an available automatic transmission.

Saehan Maepsy badge

In 1981, in an attempt at consolidating the South Korean transportation industry which had been hard hit by the 1980 recession, the new military dictatorship of Chun Doo-hwan forced Kia to give up production of its Brisa and focus entirely on light trucks. In return, Saehan and Hyundai had to give up this segment of the market, while a planned merger of the two did not come to fruition. Not only did these changes allow Saehan a bigger share of the market, but they were also able to use the domestically built 1.3-liter (Mazda TC) engine that Kia no longer had any use for, which lowered the price of the new Maepsy considerably. The facelifted Saehan Maepsy was introduced in February 1982, with the 1.3-liter engine using LPG and producing 76 PS (56 kW) (SAE) for a top speed of 151 km/h (94 mph). The 1.5-liter model claimed 84 PS (62 kW) (SAE) but somehow had a slightly lower top speed of 150 km/h (93 mph) (140 km/h or 87 mph for the automatic). In 1983, the name was changed to Daewoo Maepsy.

In September 1983, for the 1984 model year, the car received another facelift, with bigger rectangular headlamps, becoming the Maepsy-Na in the process. The rear was also changed, echoing the design of the 1979 Isuzu Gemini. The XQ engine was built by Daewoo from April 1984 and installed in the Maepsy beginning in September, meaning that Kia's 1.3-liter version was retired. Claimed power for the earlier 1.5 was now only 60 PS (44 kW) as South Korea had switched to using DIN ratings, but when the XQ arrived Daewoo once again used SAE gross and claimed 85 PS (63 kW). Between 1982 and 1989, 400,000 Maepsys and Maepsy-Nas were built.

Production of the regular sedan ended in July 1986 when the Racer/LeMans was introduced although a version intended for taxi usage continued to be produced until 1989 as the "Daewoo Maepsy Sigma". The Sigma was fitted with an LPG-powered 1.5-litre of Opel origins, as also used in the LeMans. This engine produces 82 PS (60 kW) at 5,500 rpm.

== Saehan/Daewoo Max ==
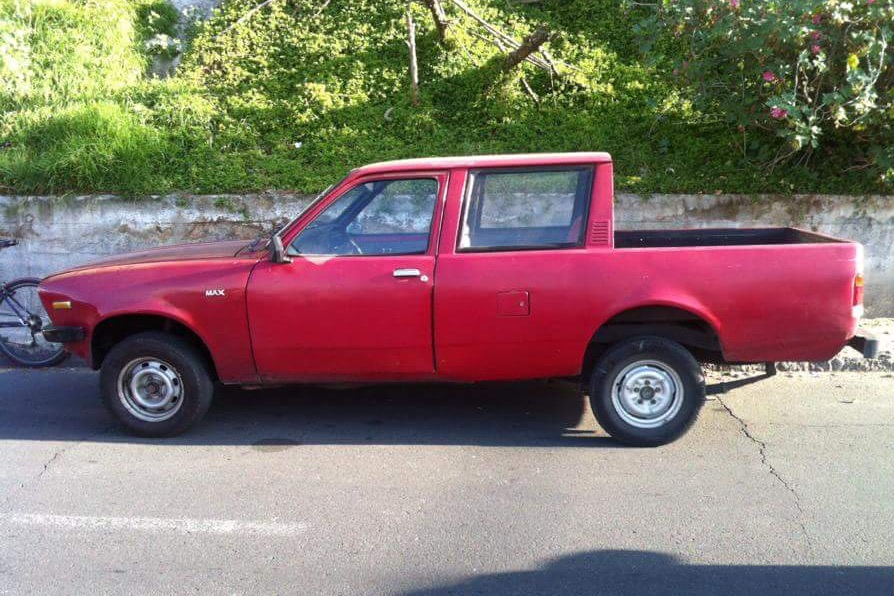
Saehan Max Pick up

A pickup truck version was also offered initially as the Saehan Max and later as the Daewoo Max from August 1979 to May 1988. These have the 1.5-liter four, although Opel's 2-liter diesel engine became available in May 1980. These were exported to Greece as the "Saehan Max 850" (reflecting the max load capacity), but in 1980 the importer went bankrupt in part due to new, more stringent European rules being introduced in Greece. 220 leftover trucks (cabins without beds) were left in a customs area in Athens. After a number of years they were bought by a Norwegian entrepreneur and sold in Norway at rock bottom prices, in spite of much resistance from other local importers.

In December 1981 a three-way bed was introduced, and in January 1983 the name was changed to Daewoo Max. The Max used the original Gemini front even as the Maepsy's new bodywork was introduced in 1982, but the 1984 facelift was applied to the Max as well. Beginning in November 1984 the 1.5-liter XQ engine was installed in the Max as well. The Max ended production in 1988 without a successor.
