= List of Isuzu engines =

Isuzu has used both its own engines and General Motors-built engines. It has also developed engines for General Motors, Renault, Saab, Honda, Nissan, Opel and Mazda.

== Overview ==
Isuzu engines carry a two-character prefix which designate the number of cylinders and engine family. Engines available currently include the following:

Cyl.	Family	Displacement	Power Rating	Notes
3	C	0.57–1.6 L (34.8–97.6 in^{3})	11.8–23.9 hp (8.8–17.8 kW)	
4	L	2.179 L (133.0 in^{3})	40–62 hp (30–46 kW)	
4	J	2.999 L (183.0 in^{3})	70–115 hp (52–86 kW)	
4	B	4.3 L (262.4 in^{3})	98–111 hp (73–83 kW)	
6	B	6.5 L (396.7 in^{3})	154–174 hp (115–130 kW)	
4	H	5.193 L (316.9 in^{3})	173–188 hp (129–140 kW)	Also available as LP/CNG engine (4HV1).
6	H	7.790 L (475.4 in^{3})	282 hp (210 kW)	Also available as LP/CNG engine (4HV1).
6	U	9.839 L (600.4 in^{3})	362 hp (270 kW)	
6	W	15.681 L (956.9 in^{3})	512 hp (382 kW)	

== Two-cylinder ==
=== Diesel ===
Designation	Description	Bore	Stroke	Displacement	Power Rating	Production Run	Dry Weight
2AA1	There is also a three-cylinder version called the 3AA1. The Bosch PES-K fuel pump is shared with the 2AB1, and is similar to the PES-A used on the 3AA1, 3AB1, C220, and C240 engines.	86 mm (3.4 in)	84 mm (3.3 in)	975 cc (59.5 cu in)	19.5 PS (14.3 kW) @2800rpm	1972–1989	160 kg (350 lb)
2AB1	There is also a three-cylinder version called the 3AB1.	86 mm (3.4 in)	106 mm (4.2 in)	1,184 cc (72.3 cu in)	25.5 PS (18.8 kW) @2800rpm	1970–1991	160 kg (350 lb)
UM-2AB1	A marinised version of the 2AB1	86 mm (3.4 in)	106 mm (4.2 in)	1,184 cc (72.3 cu in)		1971–1991	
2CA1	A marinised version is produced by Klassen Engines - the Suzie 14			653 cc (39.8 cu in)	12.5 PS (10.6 KW) @2200rpm	1983	
2KC1		74 mm (2.9 in)	76 mm (3.0 in)	653 cc (39.8 cu in)		1988–1994	
UM-2KC1	A marinised version of the 2KC1. Also marinised briefly by Beta Marine Limited.	74 mm (2.9 in)	76 mm (3.0 in)				

== Three-cylinder ==
=== Diesel ===
==== A Engines ====
Designation	Description	Bore	Stroke	Displacement	Power Rating	Production Run	Dry Weight
3AA1	This engine shares the bore and stroke of the C190 four-cylinder diesel and 2AA1 two-cylinder. The Bosch PES-A fuel pump is the same as the one used on the 3AA1, 3AB1, C220, and C240 engines.	86 mm (3.4 in)	84 mm (3.3 in)	1,463 cc (89.3 cu in)	29.5 PS (21.7 kW) @2800rpm	1972–90	197 kg (434 lb).
3AB1	This engine shares the bore of the 2AA1/3AA1/C240, but with a much longer stroke. There is also a two-cylinder version called the 2AB1.	86 mm (3.4 in)	102 mm (4.0 in)	1,777 cc (108.4 cu in)	38 PS (28 kW) @2800rpm	1971-	217 kg (478 lb).
3AD1						1977–90	
3AD1-T						1978–79	

==== L Engine ====
Designation	Description	Bore	Stroke	Displacement	Power Rating	Production Run	Dry Weight
3LA1							
3LB1							OHV
3LD1							OHV
3LD1							OHV

== Four-cylinder ==
=== Petrol ===
==== GH engine ====
Isuzu's first petrol engines were license built Hillman units for the locally assembled Minx, from 1953. Called the GH10 it has a bore of 65 mm (2.56 in) and a stroke of 95 mm (3.74 in) for a displacement of 1,260 cc (76.9 cu in). Power is 37.5 PS (28 kW). In 1955 this was updated to the GH12, a square design with a 76.2 mm bore and stroke for a displacement of 1,390 cc (84.8 cu in). This was upgraded in 1956 for more power, 46 PS (34 kW) rather than the original's 43 PS (32 kW), and was renamed GH100. In 1958, power increased yet again, to 50 PS (37 kW).

==== GL engine ====
For 1959 Isuzu developed their own square design (78 mm or 3.07 in) called the GL150, Isuzu's first own petrol engine. Still showing unmistakable Hillman origins it displaces 1,491 cc (91.0 cu in) and has 60 PS (44 kW). The GL150 was fitted to the 1959 Isuzu Elf and the 1961 Bellel.

==== General Motors ====
- The Isuzu Hombre used a General Motors-built Vortec 2200 Engine with 118 hp (86 kW) and 140 ft·lb (190 N·m) of torque.
- 2004–2006 Isuzu i-Series used a General Motors-built Vortec 2800 Engine with 175 hp (130 kW) and 185 ft·lb (251 N·m) of torque.
- 2007–2008 Isuzu i-Series use a General Motors-built Vortec 2900 Engine with 185 hp (138 kW) and 195 ft·lb (263 N·m) of torque.

==== Isuzu G engine ====
Designation	Description	Bore	Stroke	Displacement	Power Rating	Valvetrain
G130	This engine was used in the Isuzu Bellett, Bellett B, and Bellett Express.	75 mm (3.0 in)	75 mm (3.0 in)	1,325 cc (80.9 cu in)	58 PS (43 kW)	OHV
G140	The 1.4 L G140 engine was used in the Chevrolet Chevette in North America. The engine block and associated components for the USA market Isuzu G-series engines were locally produced under license by a GM engine casting and assembly plant in Flint, Michigan. In South America an overhead-cam version was adapted, and later developed into a 1599 cc version with a 75.7 mm stroke.	82 mm (3.2 in)	66.2 mm (2.61 in)	1,398 cc (85.3 cu in)	53 PS (39 kW)	OHV
G150	The 1.5 L G150 engine was used in the Isuzu Bellett and the Isuzu Elf.	79 mm (3.1 in)	75 mm (3.0 in)	1,471 cc (89.8 cu in)	68 PS (50 kW)	OHV
G160/G161	The eight-valve 1.6 L G160/G161 engine was used in the Isuzu Florian and the Isuzu Bellett GT, as well as a number of commercial vehicles including the Elf 150 (KA41/51). The G160 has a three main bearing crankshaft, whereas the G161 has five bearings. There is also an SOHC version of this called the G161S, which was used in the Florian and the Bellett. A new version of this engine, with the same dimensions, was called the G161Z and was installed in the Florian, Isuzu Gemini, Holden Gemini and Holden Rodeo, and Chevrolet Chevette. Part of the "Z" engine family, this was later renamed the 4ZA1. A further (albeit earlier) development was the twin-cam G161W engine (still with eight valves) first presented in the Isuzu Bellett GT-R in March 1968.	82 mm (3.2 in)	75.7 mm (2.98 in)	1,599 cc (97.6 cu in)	61 PS (45 kW)	OHV
G180	The 1.8 L G180SS engine was used in the Isuzu Bellett GT. The 1.8 L G180Z SOHC engine was used in the 1972–1976 Opel Kadett, Isuzu Gemini, Chevrolet LUV, and Isuzu 117 Coupé. There is also the G180W DOHC eight valve engine which was used in the Gemini ZZ (Japan only) and the Isuzu 117 Coupé.	84 mm (3.3 in)	82 mm (3.2 in)	1,818 cc (110.9 cu in)	78–80 hp (79–81 PS; 58–60 kW) @4800rpm 95 lb⋅ft (129 N⋅m) @3000rpm	SOHC
G200	The 2.0 L G200Z engine was used in the 1981–1985 Chevrolet LUV and also Isuzu Trooper (Holden Jackaroo in Australia). With carburettor it has 86 hp, with EFI in the Isuzu Piazza 90 hp in the US and 110 hp in Japan. The G200W DOHC eight valve engine was found in the 19??-1985 JDM, Isuzu 117 Coupé and early Isuzu Piazza with 135 hp (101 kW) and 123 lb·ft (167 N·m) of torque. It was also installed in 1982–1985 GMC S-15 pickup trucks, where it received the LR1 engine code. Unlike the 1.4 which was locally produced, the G200 was imported. It was also used with the second generation LUV and Isuzu P'UP until GM discontinued it as the entry level powerplant when the Iron Duke was made the base motor after 1985; some early S10/S15s came with the optional GM 122 engine shared with its J-platform compacts since it was locally produced.	87 mm (3.4 in)	82 mm (3.2 in)	1,949 cc (118.9 cu in)	82 hp (83 PS; 61 kW) @4600rpm 101 lb⋅ft (137 N⋅m) @3000rpm	SOHC
G201	This 2-liter inline-four is a gasoline-powered version of the diesel C190. It has an 8.0 : 1 compression ratio. It was fitted to certain models of the Isuzu Elf 250 (TLG42).	86 mm (3.4 in)	84 mm (3.3 in)	1,951 cc (119.1 cu in)	93 PS (68 kW) at 4800 rpm 16.0 kg⋅m (157 N⋅m; 116 lb⋅ft) at 3000 rpm	SOHC

==== Isuzu X engine ====
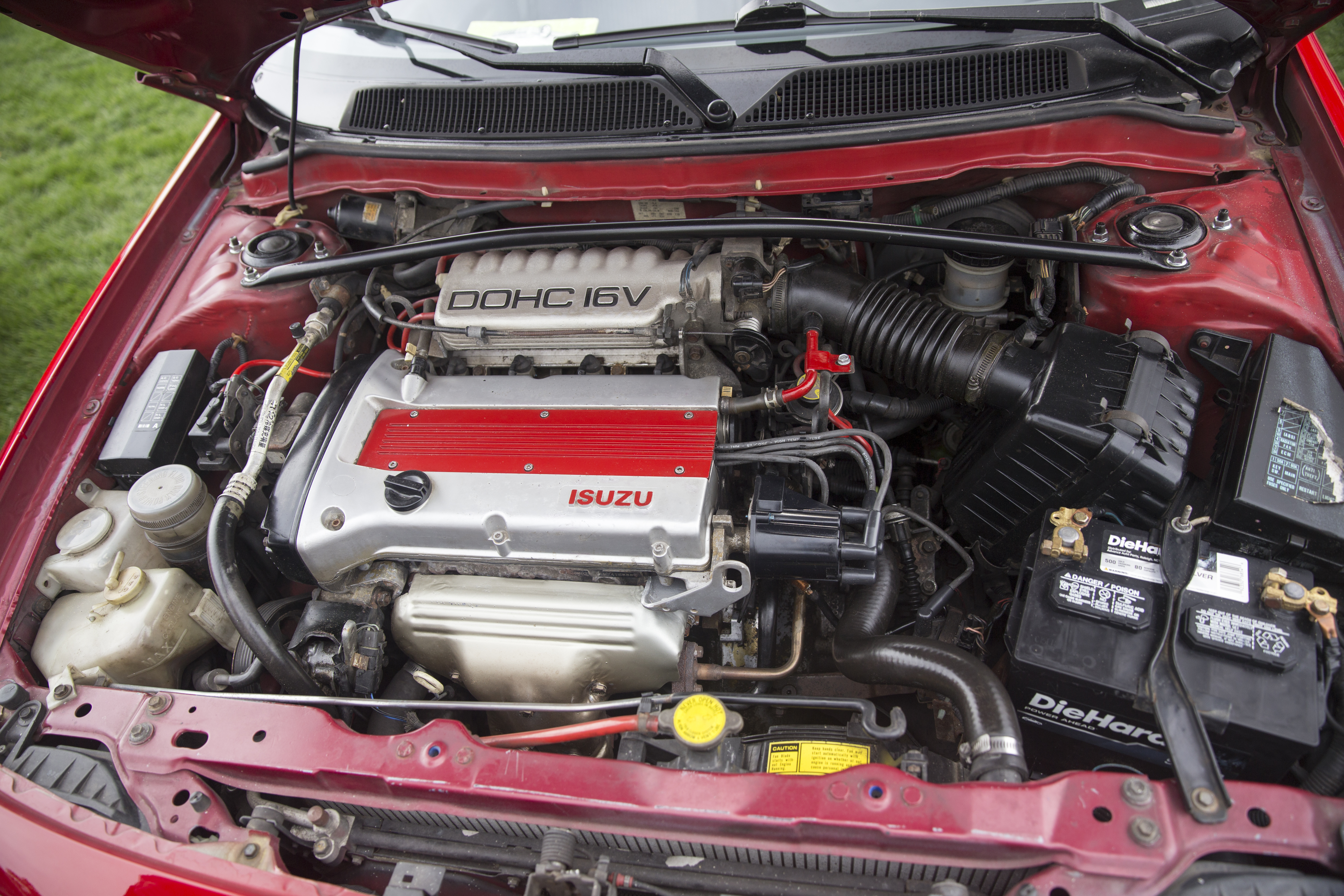
4XE1 DOHC engine in a 1991 Isuzu Stylus (US-market Gemini)

Designation	Description	Bore	Stroke	Displacement	Power Rating	Valvetrain
4XB1	The 1.3 L 4XB1 engine was available in export market Isuzu Gemini JT140s.	72.3 mm (2.85 in)	79 mm (3.11 in)	1,297 cc (79.1 cu in)	72 PS (53 kW) DIN at 5400 rpm	SOHC
4XC1	The 1.5 L 4XC1 SOHC engine was the base engine for the Isuzu Gemini FF, the JT22 series Isuzu Piazza, and its Chevrolet Spectrum derivatives. Power ranged from 70 hp (52 kW) in US-spec versions via 76 PS (56 kW) in the non-catalyzed European models, to a turbocharged version with 120 PS (88 kW) (down to 110 hp SAE in the US). Later versions received a twelve-valve head, as installed in the JT150 Gemini it offered 100 PS (74 kW) at 6,000 rpm.	77 mm (3.0 in)	79 mm (3.11 in)	1,471 cc (89.8 cu in)		SOHC
4XE1-V	The 1.6L 4XE1-V engine was used in the base model Geo Storm and the base model Isuzu Stylus S.	80 mm (3.15 in)	79 mm (3.11 in)	1,588 cc (96.9 cu in)	96 hp (72 kW; 97 PS)	SOHC
4XE1-UW	The 1.6L 4XE1-UW engine was used in the 1990-1991 Isuzu Impulse XS, in the 1990-1991 Isuzu Stylus XS, in the 1990-1991 Geo Storm GSi, and the M100 Lotus Elan.	80 mm (3.15 in)	79 mm (3.11 in)	1,588 cc (96.9 cu in)	130 hp (97 kW; 132 PS); 140 PS (103 kW) in Japanese spec.	16 Valve DOHC
4XE1-WT	The 1.6L 4XE1-WT turbocharged engine was used in the M100 Lotus Elan, the Isuzu Impulse RS, and the 1991 Isuzu Stylus RS as well as the JDM Gemini sedan.	80 mm (3.15 in)	79 mm (3.11 in)	1,588 cc (96.9 cu in)	160 hp (119 kW; 162 PS); 180 PS (132 kW) in Japanese spec.	16 Valve DOHC
4XF1	The larger 1.8L 4XF1 replaced the 4XE1 in North America. This engine was used in the 1992-1993 Geo Storm GSi, in the 1992 Isuzu Stylus RS, and in the Asüna Sunfire. In Japan it was installed in the Isuzu Piazza, where it had 150 PS (110 kW).	80 mm (3.15 in)	90 mm (3.54 in)	1,809 cc (110.4 cu in)	140 hp (142 PS; 104 kW); 125 lb⋅ft (169 N⋅m)	16 Valve DOHC

==== Isuzu Z engine ====
Designation	Description	Bore	Stroke	Displacement	Power Rating	Valvetrain
4ZA1	The 1.6L 4ZA1 engine is based on the earlier G161 engine.	82 mm (3.2 in)	75 mm (3.0 in)	1,584 cc (96.7 cu in)		SOHC
4ZB1	The 1.8L 4ZB1 engine was used in the 1981 to 1985 Isuzu Fargo. It was a development of the earlier G180 engine. It has also been built by Hindustan Motors in India since the 1990s, replacing the G180Z there.	84 mm (3.3 in)	82 mm (3.2 in)	1,817 cc (110.9 cu in)	88 PS (65 kW)	8 Valve SOHC
4ZC1	The 2.0L 4ZC1 engine was used in the Isuzu Fargo van from 1986 onward, where it produced 94 PS (69 kW). This was also used in the Isuzu Aska, where it produced 110 PS (81 kW) (JIS). The export version claimed 100 PS (74 kW). A 150 PS (110 kW) turbo version (4ZC1-T) could be found in the Isuzu Piazza & Isuzu Aska.	88 mm (3.5 in)	82 mm (3.2 in)	1,994 cc (121.7 cu in)		8 Valve SOHC
4ZD1	The 2.3L 4ZD1 could be found in the Pickup, the MU/Wizard/Rodeo/Amigo, and the Trooper. Max power in the Amigo/MU was 96 hp (72 kW), while export market Troopers (carburetted) produced 110 PS (81 kW) and the MY 1988/89 US market Isuzu Piazza received an MPFi version with 110 hp (82 kW) at 5000 rpm.	89.3 mm (3.52 in)	90 mm (3.54 in)	2,255 cc (137.6 cu in)		8 Valve SOHC
4ZE1	The 2.6L 4ZE1 engine was available as an option to replace the 4ZD1 on four-wheel-drive models. It was fitted to the MU/Wizard/Rodeo/Amigo, the Trooper, and the Pickup. Later models received a slightly bigger bore and displacement.	92.6 mm (3.65 in); 93.0 mm (3.66 in)	95.0 mm (3.74 in)	2,559 cc (156.2 cu in); 2,581 cc (157.5 cu in)	115–122 PS (85–90 kW)	8 Valve SOHC

=== Diesel ===
==== Isuzu B engine ====
Isuzu considered the B engine their "small" truck engine. Initially designed in 1969 as a 3.6-liter four cylinder or a 5.4-liter six-cylinder direct injection unit, other displacements were added later on. In 1980 a 3.3-liter version appeared.

Designation	Description	Bore	Stroke	Displacement	Power Rating	Valvetrain
4BA1	The 4BA1 is a 2.8L diesel sold in Isuzu Elf light trucks of several generations.	98 mm (3.9 in)	92 mm (3.6 in)	2,775 cc (169.3 cu in)	75 PS (55 kW); 165 N⋅m (122 lb⋅ft) at 2200 rpm	
4BB1	The 4BB1 is a direct injection diesel sold in Isuzu ELF and KT light trucks from 1973 to 1979. It is a four-cylinder version of the 6BB1.	102 mm (4.0 in)	110 mm (4.3 in)	3,595 cc (219.4 cu in)	80 to 100 PS (59 to 74 kW) at 3300-3400 rpm 265 N⋅m (195 lb⋅ft) at 2000 rpm	
4BC1	The 4BC1 is a 3.3L diesel sold in Isuzu ELF light trucks from 1980 to 1982.	102 mm (4.0 in)	100 mm (3.9 in)	3,268 cc (199.4 cu in)	85 PS (63 kW); 175 N⋅m (129 lb⋅ft) at 2500 rpm	
4BC2	The 4BC2 is a 3.3 L direct injection version of the 4BC1. It was sold in the Isuzu ELF and NPR trucks from 1982 to 1987.	102 mm (4.0 in)	100 mm (3.9 in)	3,268 cc (199.4 cu in)	90 PS (66 kW) at 3500 rpm 200 newton-metres (148 lb⋅ft) at 2000 rpm	
4BD1	The 4BD1 is a 3.9L direct injection diesel sold in Isuzu ELF trucks as well as marine and industrial applications from 1979. Power output varied. 1979 models had 64 kW (87 PS; 86 hp) at 3200rpm, 1988 models had 83 kW (113 PS; 111 hp) at 3200 rpm 270 N⋅m (200 lb⋅ft) at 1900 rpm. OEM diesel in Australian specification Land Rover SIII Stage 1 and coil sprung 110, 120, and Land Rover Perentie models from 1981 to 1992.	102 mm (4.0 in)	118 mm (4.6 in)	3,856 cc (235.3 cu in)		
4BD1T	The 4BD1T is a turbocharged version of the 3.9-litre 4BD1. It was produced from 1985 and was fitted to Isuzu NPR trucks from 1986 and sold in the US. OEM diesel in Australian specifications Land Rover Perentie 6X6 models from 1989 to 1992. Different versions feature power ratings ranging from 90 to 100 kW (122 to 136 PS; 121 to 134 hp). Peak torque ranges from 314 to 330 N⋅m (232 to 243 lb⋅ft) at 1800 rpm. Also used in jeepneys built in Batangas.	102 mm (4.0 in)	118 mm (4.6 in)	3,856 cc (235.3 cu in)		
4BD2T	The 4BD2T is an indirect injection version of the 4BD1T that was also intercooled, it replaced the 4BD1T in the US market until 1998.	102 mm (4.0 in)	118 mm (4.6 in)	3,856 cc (235.3 cu in)	100 kW (136 PS) at 3000 rpm 345 N⋅m (254 lb⋅ft) at 2000 rpm	
4BE1	The 4BE1 is a 3.6L direct injection engine. It is a high revving high output diesel on its VE-Rotary Zexel injection pump. It replaced the 4BC2 in Isuzu NPR's from 1987- non turbo, while the other version uses Diesel Kiki A-type injection pump but not the same as high revving like the Rotary version. Power ratings in VE-Rotary versions (NKR300) are 74 kW (100 PS) at 3800 rpm and 242 N⋅m (178 lb⋅ft) at 2000 rpm	105 mm (4.1 in)	105 mm (4.1 in)	3,636 cc (221.9 cu in)		
4BG1	The 4BG1 is a 4.3L, non turbo, direct injection industrial and marine engine. The 4BG1T is a turbocharged version of the 4BG1 and is available in marine ratings to 81.640361249999 kW (111 PS).	105 mm (4.1 in)	125 mm (4.9 in)	4,329 cc (264.2 cu in)		

==== Isuzu C engine ====
Isuzu's C-series engine was a mainstay for their light truck production, as well as for industrial and marine uses. The engine was introduced in 1959; by 1985 over 2 million units had been produced. It was replaced in 1985 by the larger J-series engine.

Designation	Description	Bore	Stroke	Displacement	Power Rating	Valvetrain
C180	The C180 engine was used in the Isuzu Bellett, Bellett B, Express, and Wasp.	79 mm (3.1 in)	90 mm (3.5 in)	1,764 cc (107.6 cu in)	50 PS (37 kW).	8 Valve OHV
C190	The C190 is a 2.0 L engine used in the Isuzu Faster/Holden Rodeo and Isuzu Florian and also Isuzu KB. It was also fitted to the Delta Mini Cruiser for the European market. It has also been fitted to light-duty versions of the Isuzu Elf and the Isuzu Journey-S minibus. For later industrial and marine applications, this engine has been called 4AA1. There is also a gasoline-powered iteration of this engine, called the G 201 FA.	86 mm (3.4 in)	84 mm (3.3 in)	1,951 cc (119.1 cu in)	62 PS (46 kW) at 4400 rpm	8 Valve OHV
C220; C221; C223	The C220, C221, C223 is a 2.2L engine with 58 hp and 93 ft·lb of torque used in the 1981–1982 Chevrolet LUV and the 1981 through 1987 Isuzu P'up; GM also used the C220 series as an option (RPO LQ7) with the Chevrolet S10/GMC S15; low demand led to its discontinuation after the 1985 model year where subsequent S-series were gasoline powered. It was also used in the 1979–1981 Isuzu 117 Coupé XD/XDL, one of the first cars with sporting pretensions to be fitted with a diesel engine. In the 117, claimed max power (JIS) increased to 73 PS (54 kW) at 4,300 rpm. It is a bored out version of the 2-litre DL201 and was first seen in the 1964 Isuzu Elf, as the C220 with 62 PS. For the 1968 new model Elf it was upgraded (now with 65 PS) and called the C221.	88 mm (3.5 in)	92 mm (3.6 in)	2,238 cc (136.6 cu in)		8 Valve OHV
C240	The C240 was often used in stationary and forklift applications. It has been used in the second and third generation Isuzu Elf 250 since late 1969 (TLD23) and also in the rare, front-wheel drive "Elf Mypack" (KUD20). For later industrial and marine applications, this engine has been called 4AB1. This family of Isuzu engines were fitted in early diesel jeepneys and CJ2A, CJ3A jeeps made by Francisco Motors and Sarao Motors in the Philippines.	86 mm (3.4 in)	102 mm (4.0 in)	2,369 cc (144.6 cu in)	38 to 68 hp (39 to 69 PS; 28 to 51 kW); 145 N⋅m (107 lb⋅ft)	8 Valve OHV

==== Isuzu DL engine ====
Designation	Description	Bore	Stroke	Displacement	Power Rating	Valvetrain
DL200	The DL200 is a long-stroke 2.0L engine with cast iron block and head. It was fitted to the Isuzu Elf. In 1961 it was replaced by the more modern DL201 engine.	79 mm (3.1 in)	107 mm (4.2 in)	1,999 cc (122.0 cu in)	52 PS (38 kW); 12 kg⋅m (120 N⋅m; 87 lb⋅ft)	8 Valve OHV
	There is also a 1.6L engine with cast iron block and head. It was fitted to the Isuzu Bellel. The fuel injection was a licensed Bosch unit.	79 mm (3.1 in)	82 mm (3.2 in)	1,608 cc (98.1 cu in)	52 PS (38 kW); 87 lb⋅ft (118 N⋅m)	8 Valve OHV
DL201	The DL201 is a 2.0L engine with cast iron block and head. It was fitted to the Bellel and Bellel Express as well as the Elf and Elfin trucks. Like its smaller sister, the DL201 used a license-built Bosch fuel injection unit.	83 mm (3.3 in)	92 mm (3.6 in)	1,991 cc (121.5 cu in)	55 PS (40 kW); 8.9 kg⋅m (87 N⋅m; 64 lb⋅ft)	8 Valve OHV

==== Isuzu E engine ====
This family of engines started as the swirl chamber design, later modified into direct injection (4EE1), with a final improvement into a 16-valve direct common rail injection (4EE2).

Designation	Description	Bore	Stroke	Displacement	Power Rating	Valvetrain
4EC1; T4EC1	Power in the atmospheric version is 50 PS (37 kW) at 4,800 rpm and 90 Nm at 3,000 rpm. The turbocharged version (IHI) develops 67 PS (49 kW) at 4,600 rpm and 132 Nm at 2,600 rpm as fitted to the Opel Corsa A (with 0.68 bar or 9.9 psi of boost), and 72 PS (53 kW) at 4,600 rpm and 143 Nm at 2,600 rpm when fitted to the larger Opel Kadett E. This engine was first seen in the Isuzu Gemini FF.	76 mm (3.0 in)	82 mm (3.2 in)	1,488 cc (90.8 cu in)		8 Valve SOHC
4EE1	The turbocharged and intercooled version first seen in the 1990 Isuzu Gemini. This engine formed the basis for the common rail, direct injection 4EE2 engine now produced by Opel	79 mm (3.1 in)	86 mm (3.4 in)	1,686 cc (102.9 cu in)	88 PS (65 kW) @4,500rpm 167 N⋅m (123 lb⋅ft) @2,500rpm	8 Valve SOHC
4EE2	This engine is now produced by Opel, who calls it the Ecotec DTi/CDTi. Better known as the "Circle L engine", it is made in Poland by Isuzu Motors Polska and is available in certain Opel and Honda vehicles. It was available in versions of 100, 110 and latest 130 PS. The only visible difference between the versions is the relocation of the oil filler cap from upper right (Honda 2003–2005, engine type 4EE 2, 100PS version, 5-hole injector nozzles), to lower right, then to lower left corner of the engine (Opel engine types A17DT A17DTC A17DTE). The early version used 5-hole injector nozzles, the latest has 7-hole injector nozzles for better emissions and fuel economy.	79 mm (3.1 in)	86 mm (3.4 in)	1,686 cc (102.9 cu in)	74 kW (101 PS)	16 Valve DOHC
A17DTL A17DTN	After the ISUZU Polska factory went under full GM ownership, the engine marking changed to A17. All modifications of the original 4EE2 are physically only minor and can be considered tuning instead of an all-new development.	79 mm (3.1 in)	86 mm (3.4 in)	1,686 cc (102.9 cu in)	100 PS (74 kW)	16 Valve DOHC
A17DTJ A17DTC A17DTE	All the A17 engines are almost identical to the 4EE2 base engine, the main changes are in the ECU, control software, camshaft position sensing wheel, added sensors (exhaust temperature), injector upgrades and modifications of the engine cover, resulting in shifting oil cap position.	79 mm (3.1 in)	86 mm (3.4 in)	1,686 cc (102.9 cu in)	110 PS (81 kW) A17DTJ power A17DTC power A17DTE power	16 Valve DOHC
A17DTR		79 mm (3.1 in)	86 mm (3.4 in)	1,686 cc (102.9 cu in)	125 PS (92 kW)	16 Valve DOHC
A17DTS	The latest engine tuning and highest power specification, still within EURO5 emission standard. The engine block remained unchanged from 1992 until 2014.	79 mm (3.1 in)	86 mm (3.4 in)	1,686 cc (102.9 cu in)	130 PS (96 kW) A17DTS power	16 Valve DOHC

==== Isuzu F engine ====
Designation	Description	Bore	Stroke	Displacement	Power Rating	Valvetrain
4FB1	The 4FB1 is a 1.8L engine used in the 1981–1986 Chevrolet Chevette and the 1979–1987 Isuzu Gemini/I-Mark as well as the Australian Holden Gemini iteration of that car. It was also available with electronic fuel injection (Bosch) and with a turbocharger. 61 PS (45 kW) at 5,000rpm, 11.2 kg⋅m (110 N⋅m; 81 lb⋅ft) at 2,000rpm (JIS) 66 PS (49 kW) at 5,000rpm, 11.2 kg⋅m (110 N⋅m; 81 lb⋅ft) at 2,000rpm (JIS) - Electronic injection 73 PS (54 kW) at 5,000rpm, 16.0 kg⋅m (157 N⋅m; 116 lb⋅ft) at 2,500rpm (JIS) - Turbocharged	84 mm (3.3 in)	82 mm (3.2 in)	1,817 cc (110.9 cu in)	51 hp (52 PS; 38 kW) at 5000rpm 72 lb⋅ft (98 N⋅m)	8 Valve SOHC
4FC1	The 4FC1 is a 2.0L engine used in the Isuzu Aska, and in Hindustan Ambassador in turbo and non-turbo (2DE1 NA) form.	84 mm (3.3 in)	90 mm (3.5 in)	1,995 cc (121.7 cu in)		8 Valve SOHC
4FD1	The 4FD1 is a 2.2L engine used in the Isuzu Midi, non-turbo form. 4 cylinder, inline, water cooled, SOHC; Compression ratio: 21.5:1	88 mm (3.5 in)	90 mm (3.5 in)	2,189 cc (133.6 cu in)	61 bhp (62 PS; 45 kW) at 4400rpm 92.9 lb⋅ft (126.0 N⋅m) at 2000rpm	8 Valve SOHC

==== Isuzu H engine ====
All engines are SOHC with direct injection and are normally aspirated (N/A) or turbocharged (T) or turbocharged and intercooled (T/I)

Three bores: 110 mm (4.3 in), 112 mm (4.4 in), 115 mm (4.5 in)

Four strokes: 110 mm (4.3 in), 115 mm (4.5 in), 120 mm (4.7 in), 125 mm (4.9 in)

4HL1 versions have common rail high-pressure fuel injection system with electronic control system (= CR-ECS)

Designation	Bore	Stroke	Displacement	Power Rating	Valves	Notes	Vehicle
4HE1-T	110	125	4,752 cc (290.0 cu in)	148 PS (109 kW) at 2,900 rpm 400 N⋅m (300 lb⋅ft) at 1,800 rpm	8	T	1998 NQR500
4HE1-XN	110	125	4,752 cc (290.0 cu in)	127 kW (173 PS) at 2,700 rpm 458 N⋅m (338 lb⋅ft) at 2,000-2,400 rpm	8	T	2003 NPR400
4HF1	112	110	4,334 cc (264.5 cu in)	85 kW (116 PS) at 3,200 rpm 285 N⋅m (210 lb⋅ft) at 1,800 rpm	8	N/A	1998 NPR200
4HG1-T	115	110	4.57L	89 kW (121 PS) at 3,000 rpm 325 N⋅m (240 lb⋅ft) at 1,800 rpm	8	T	2000 NPR350A
4HJ1	115	120	4,985 cc (304.2 cu in)	111 kW (151 PS) at 3,100 rpm 363 N⋅m (268 lb⋅ft) at 1,600 rpm	8	N/A	1998-2004 Elf
4HK1-TCN	115	125	5,193 cc (316.9 cu in)	109 kW (148 PS) at 2,600 rpm 402 N⋅m (296 lb⋅ft) at 1,500-2,600 rpm	16	T	2006 NPR400
4HK1-TCC	115	125	5,193 cc (316.9 cu in)	139 kW (189 PS) @2600rpm 510 N⋅m (380 lb⋅ft) @1500-2000rpm	16	T	2008 NQR500
4HK1-TCS	115	125	5,193 cc (316.9 cu in)	129 kW (175 PS) @2600rpm 500 N⋅m (370 lb⋅ft) @1600-2600rpm	16	T	2005 NQR500
4HL1	115	115	4,777 cc (291.5 cu in)	103 kW (140 PS) @3000rpm 333 N⋅m (246 lb⋅ft) @1500rpm	16	CR-ECS; N/A	
4HL1-N	115	115	4,777 cc (291.5 cu in)	96 kW (131 PS) @3000rpm 333 N⋅m (246 lb⋅ft) @1500rpm	16	CR-ECS; N/A	
4HL1-TC	115	115	4,777 cc (291.5 cu in)	118 kW (160 PS) @2700rpm 425 N⋅m (313 lb⋅ft) @1500rpm	16	CR-ECS; T/I	
4HL1-TCS	115	115	4,777 cc (291.5 cu in)	132 kW (179 PS) @2700rpm 500 N⋅m (370 lb⋅ft) @1500rpm	16	CR-ECS; T/I	

==== Isuzu J engine ====
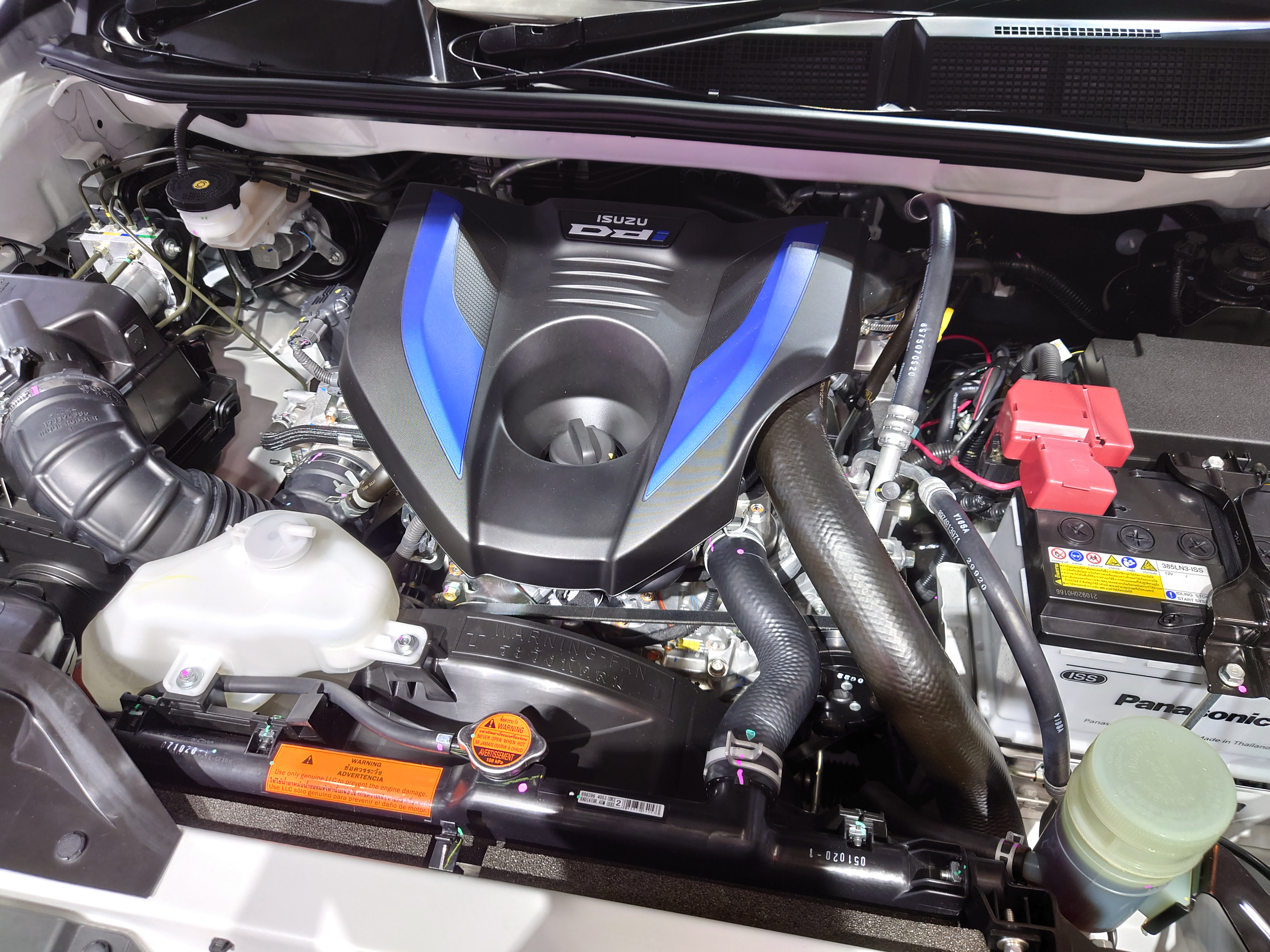
Isuzu 4JJ3-TCX Engine

The J-series direct injection diesel engine was introduced in 1985, in 2.5 or 2.8 liter displacements. Initially installed only in lighter duty versions of the Isuzu Elf, it soon found its way into other Isuzu products. It replaced the somewhat smaller C engine; later on 3.1- and 3.0-liter versions were also introduced - still with four cylinders in line.

Designation	Description	Bore	Stroke	Displacement	Compression Ratio	Power Rating	Valvetrain
4JA1	The 4JA1 is a direct injection 8V. It was used in a variety of Isuzu TF Pickups under a variety of names including Opel Campo, and also in the Thai market Isuzu Cameo (as well as the 1991-1997 Mazda B2500 "Thunder"; 1992-1996 Ford Marathon) and in the Isuzu Panther, an Isuzu MUV car produced in Indonesia. In Thai specs, the naturally aspirated eight-valve version claimed 90 hp in 1992.	93 mm (3.7 in)	92 mm (3.6 in)	2,499 cc (152.5 cu in)	18.4:1	76 PS (56 kW) at 4200 rpm 17.5 kg⋅m (172 N⋅m) at 2000 rpm	
4JA1-L	The current 4JA1-L engine is turbocharged but not intercooled with an 18.5:1 compression ratio. The GM South Africa-built Isuzu KB250 (D-Max) pickup has 79 PS (58 kW) at 3800 rpm and 170 N⋅m (130 lb⋅ft) at 1800 rpm. For the Indonesian market it is rated at 80 PS (59 kW) at 3500 rpm and 191 N⋅m (141 lb⋅ft) at 1800 rpm and is installed in the Isuzu Bison, a relabelled Mitsubishi Delica (L300), the old Isuzu Pickup, the Isuzu Panther, and Isuzu Traga. For the Philippines it is rated at 85 PS (63 kW) at 3900 rpm and 185 N⋅m (136 lb⋅ft) at 2000 rpm and is used in the Euro2-rated Isuzu Crosswind, the local version of the Panther; and in India at 73.4 PS (54.0 kW) at 3900 rpm and 171 N⋅m (126 lb⋅ft) at 1800 rpm for the BS-3 (Euro3 equivalent) Chevrolet Tavera (another version of the Panther).	93 mm (3.7 in)	92 mm (3.6 in)	2,499 cc (152.5 cu in)			
4JA1 CR / 4JA1 Blue Power	The 4JA1-CR / 4JA1 Blue Power is a Euro 4 variant of 4JA1-L. Unlike its predecessor which used conventional Direct Injection, it uses a High Pressure Common rail Direct Injection system and Diesel particulate filter, thus achieving Euro 4 emission. Power rated at 78 PS (57 kW) at 3900 rpm and 176.5 N⋅m (18.00 kg⋅m) at 1800 rpm. It is first used in Isuzu Traviz (Filipino variant of Isuzu Traga), and later on Indonesian variant of Euro 4 Isuzu Traga			2,499 cc (152.5 cu in)		78 PS (57 kW) at 3900 rpm and 176.5 N⋅m (18.00 kg⋅m) at 1800 rpm	
4JA1-T	The 4JA1-T is a turbocharged version of 4JA1 engine.	93 mm (3.7 in)	92 mm (3.6 in)	2,499 cc (152.5 cu in)			OHV
4JB1	The 4JB1 is a 4-cylinder naturally aspirated watercooled in-line direct injection and also a high revving high output diesel engine with its VE rotary injection pump. Horse power is 90ps industrial version. torque is 135 lb.-ft. at 2000 rpm . while the light version 4JB1 uses gear type oil pump and Bosch "A" Type mechanical injection. It has a dry weight of 230 kg (510 lb). It was used in the Isuzu Bighorn (Trooper), Mu (Rodeo), Wizard (LWB Rodeo), Rodeo Pickup and Holden Jackaroo sold in most world markets aside from North America until the early 1990s. This motor was also installed in Isuzu Elf 150 and other light trucks.	93 mm (3.7 in)	102 mm (4.0 in)	2,771 cc (169.1 cu in)		87 PS (64 kW)	OHV
4JB1-T	The 4JB1-T is a turbocharged version of the 4JB1. It was intercooled in some applications. Numerous versions of the Isuzu 4JB1 remain in production in China, both by Isuzu's Chinese joint ventures and innumerable other manufacturers like YANGZI. Upgrades to common-rail direct injection to bring emissions up to National 4 standards and even 16V DOHC valve-trains are also in production.	93 mm (3.7 in)	102 mm (4.0 in)	2,771 cc (169.1 cu in)		100 and 115 PS (74 and 85 kW)	
4JC1		88 mm	92 mm	2,238 cc			OHV
4JD1		84 mm	92 mm	2,039 cc			OHV
4JE1		84mm	84 mm	1,862 cc			OHV
4JF1		75.3 mm	84 mm	1,496 cc			OHV
4JK1-TC	The 4JK1-TC is a common-rail direct injection intercooled turbo-diesel engine. It was used in the Isuzu D-Max Low variant or base model in Philippine market. and first generation Chevrolet Colorado produced in Thailand.	95.4 mm (3.76 in)	87.4 mm (3.44 in)	2,499 cc (152.5 cu in)		85 kW (116 PS); 208 N⋅m (153 lb⋅ft; 21.2 kg⋅m) at 1800-2200 rpm	16 Valve DOHC
4JK1-TCX	The 4JK1-TCX is an in line direct injection electronic common rail diesel engine with a variable geometry system (VGS) turbocharger and a compression ratio originally at 18.1:1. It was used in the Isuzu D-Max LT 4X4 model, produced in Thailand and Australia, as well as in the related Holden Rodeo and first-generation Chevrolet Colorado. The original version is still used in the South African version of the new D-Max, the Isuzu KB, and with the compression ratio reduced to 16.0:1 in the Thai-market D-Max X-series.	95.4 mm (3.76 in)	87.4 mm (3.44 in)	2,499 cc (152.5 cu in)		136 PS (100 kW); 325 N⋅m (240 lb⋅ft) at 1800-2800 rpm	16 Valve DOHC
4JK-1E5-TC	The 4JK-1E5-TC is a twin turbo version of the 4JK1 and was produced for DMAX pickups exported to Europe starting in 2012. Certified to the Euro5b emission standard with a 17.0:1 compression ratio.	95.4 mm (3.76 in)	87.4 mm (3.44 in)	2,499 cc (152.5 cu in)		120 kW (160 PS) at 3600 rpm 400 N⋅m (300 lb⋅ft; 41 kg⋅m) @1400-2000rpm	
4JG1	The 4JG1 engine has a trochoid type oil pump, gear driven from the camshaft. The fuel system operates by plunger and nozzle and is of the high pressure solid injection type (Zexel in-line Bosch A-type). The starter motor is a 12 V unit. The firing order 1-3-4-2.				18.6	48 kW (65 PS) at 2500 rpm 205 N⋅m (151 lb⋅ft; 20.9 kg⋅m)	OHV
4JG1T	The 4JG1T engine is a turbocharged version of the 4JG1. Notable differences include a reduced compression ratio of 18.1:1				18.1	63 kW (86 PS) at 2500 rpm 265 N⋅m (195 lb⋅ft; 27.0 kg⋅m)	OHV
4JG2	The 4JG2 is an indirect injection engine. It replaced the 4JB1-T in the Isuzu Bighorn (Trooper II) and Mu/Wizard (Rodeo) in most markets. This engine was upgraded from mechanical injection to electronically controlled mechanical injection.	95.4 mm (3.76 in)	107 mm (4.2 in)	3,059 cc (186.7 cu in)		70 to 84 kW (95 to 114 PS)	
4JH1-T	The 4JH1-T is a 3.0L direct injection, turbocharged and intercooled engine which replaced the 4JB1-T in the Faster/Rodeo pickups. This vehicle was sold as the Holden Rodeo in New Zealand and Australia. On some models it features an electronically controlled injection pump.					88 kW (120 PS); 245 N⋅m (181 lb⋅ft; 25.0 kg⋅m)	OHV
4JH1-TC	The 4JH1-TC is a 3.0L common rail direct injection, turbocharged and intercooled blue power engine which replaced the 4JB1-T found in Isuzu NHR and NKR in some markets. It applies to the Philippine-spec Isuzu QKR.since 2004 has undergone an upgrade to the ECU and yielded 163 hp this has emerged in some countries	95.4 mm (3.76 in)	104.9 mm (4.13 in)	2,999 cc (183.0 cu in)		77 kW (105 PS); 230 N⋅m (170 lb⋅ft; 23 kg⋅m)	
4JJ1-TC	The 4JJ1-TC is a 3.0L common rail direct injection engine with turbo and intercooler which replaced the 4JH1 in the Holden Rodeo and later Chevrolet & Holden Colorado produced in Thailand. It has a 17.5:1 compression ratio. It was commonly used in the Philippines for Alterra model in 2005 to 2014. The 4JJ1-TC-iTEQ 3.0-liter diesel engine is environment-friendly, complying with Euro 3 emission standards. Equipped with a turbocharger and intercooler, plus a common rail direct injection system, the engine produces 144 hp and 294 Nm of torque.	95.4 mm (3.76 in)	104.9 mm (4.13 in)	2,999 cc (183.0 cu in)			16 Valve DOHC
4JJ1-TCX	The 4JJ1-TCX is a 3.0L common rail direct injection engine with VGS-turbo and intercooler, originally with a 17.5:1 compression ratio. Stock power in 2006 was 163 PS (120 kW) and 360 N⋅m (270 lb⋅ft) for Manual transmission/ 333 N⋅m (246 lb⋅ft) for Automatic transmission, increased to 177 PS (130 kW) and 380 N⋅m (280 lb⋅ft) in 2011 with a reduction in compression ratio to 17.3:1. With the introduction of Isuzu's "BluePower" system for improved economy in 2015, the compression ratio was further reduced to 16.5:1 both for the facelifted "Blue Power" D-Max and the Mu-X.	95.4 mm (3.76 in)	104.9 mm (4.13 in)	2,999 cc (183.0 cu in)			16 Valve DOHC
4JJ3-TCX	The 4JJ3-TCX is a newest Engine 3.0L common rail direct injection engine with VGS-turbo and intercooler, which replaced the 4JJ1-TCX in the Isuzu D-Max It uses unit injectors With the introduction of Isuzu's "BluePower" system and 4 valves per cylinder. Power 190 PS (140 kW) and 450 N⋅m (330 lb⋅ft) of Torque in 2019, the compression ratio was further reduced to 16.3:1	95.4 mm (3.76 in)	104.9 mm (4.13 in)	2,999 cc (183.0 cu in)			16 Valve DOHC
4JJ1-T	The 4JJ1-T REDTECH is a 3.0L direct injection, turbocharged watercooled engine being marketed in the North and South America as an Industrial engine. Certified to the US EPA Tier 4 and Euro 3b/4. Dry Weight: 322 kg (709.9 lbs) Coolant Capacity (Block): 6.0L (6.3 qt.) Oil Capacity: 15.0L (15.9 qt.) Dimensions - L x W x H 911mm x 754mm x 847mm (35.9in x 29.7in x 33.3in)			3.0L (183.1 cu in)		52 KW (70 HP) @ 2000 RPM Variable	OHV
4JJ1-X	The 4JH1-X REDTECH is a 3.0L direct injection, turbocharged watercooled engine being marketed in the North and South America as a constant speed or variable speed Industrial engine. Certified to the US EPA Tier 4 and Euro 3b/4. SAE 3 flywheel housing Dry Weight: 322 kg (709.9 lbs) Coolant Capacity (Block): 6.0L (6.3 qt.) Oil Capacity: 15.0L (15.9 qt.) Dimensions: 911mm x 754mm x 847mm (35.9in x 29.7in x 33.3in)			3.0L (183.1 cu in)		70.8 KW (95HP) @ 1800 RPM Constant 85.7 KW (115 HP) @ 2200 RPM Variable	OHV
4JX1	The 4JX1 is a 3.0L HEUI direct-injection diesel engine, turbo, some intercooler, which replaced the 4JG2 in the Isuzu Bighorn/Trooper/Holden Jackaroo. It uses unit injectors and 4 valves per cylinder. Dry Weight: 254 kg Coolant Capacity: 9.3L Oil Capacity: 9.0L	95.4	104.9	2999 cc		117 kW (157 hp) at 3900rpm	DOHC
4JZ1	4JZ1-TCH/TCS is a 3.0l direct-injection advanced diesel engine, featuring both compliance to the latest emissions standards and top-class fuel efficiency. Diesel, 4-cycle, water-cooled inline DOHC	95.4	104.9	2999 cc	17.3	4JZ1-TCS 110 kW (150PS) @2800rpm 375Nm /1280-2800rpm 4JZ1-TCH 129 kW (175PS) @2960rpm 430Nm /1450-2860rpm	16 valve DOHC

==== Isuzu RZ Engine ====
- The RZ4E-TC is a 1.9L direct injection diesel powered, turbo intercooled engine which replaced the 4JK1-TCX found in Isuzu D-Max and Isuzu MU-X. The new engine's displacement is 1898cc, 601cc less than the 4JK1-TCX. In addition, the RZ4E-TC generates 150 hp at 3600rpm and 258 lb.-ft. (340Nm) of torque between 1800rpm to 2600rpm, giving it 16 hp and 22 lb.-ft. more than 4JK1-TCX. Isuzu has claimed that RZ4E-TC will have 19% better fuel efficiency compared to its predecessor. Bore is 80.0 mm and stroke is 94.4 mm. And some market have tuned up this RZ4E-TC engine to generates 163 hp at 3600rpm and 360 Nm of torque between 2000rpm to 2500rpm, but it still perform low torque in low rpm range.
- The RZ4F-TC is a 2.2L direct injection diesel powered, turbo intercooled engine which replaced the RZ4E-TC found in Isuzu D-Max and Isuzu MU-X (only in Thailand by model year 2025). The new engine's displacement is 2164cc, 175cc more than the RZ4E-TC. In addition, the RZ4F-TC generates 163 hp at 3600rpm and 295 lb.-ft. (400 Nm) of torque between 1800rpm to 2600rpm, giving it 13 hp and 37 lb.-ft. more than RZ4E-TC. Isuzu has claimed that RZ4F-TC will have 10% better fuel efficiency compared to its predecessor. Bore is 83 mm and stroke is 100 mm.

=== CNG ===
==== CNG Engines ====
Isuzu developed the first Compressed Natural Gas (CNG) engine series with low-emissions truck mounted with a clean CNG engine emitting zero black smoke.

- The 4HF1-CNG is a CNG engine of 4.334 L capacity (as based on direct injection diesel engine) with non-contact ignition system. Peak torque is 323 Nm, peak power is 120 PS (88 kW) at 1,500 rpm. Bore is 115 mm, stroke is 108 mm.
- The 4HV1 is a CNG engine of 4.570 L capacity with non-contact ignition system. Peak torque is 353 Nm, peak power is 170 PS (125 kW) at 3200 rpm. Bore is 115 mm, stroke is 110 mm. Application used for NPR300 CNG series.

== Five-cylinder ==
=== Gasoline ===
The Isuzu i-Series uses General Motors-built inline five-cylinder engines.

- 2004–2006 used the General Motors-built Vortec 3500 Engine with 220 hp (164 kW) and 225 ft·lb (305 N·m) of torque.
- 2007–2008 used the General Motors-built Vortec 3700 Engine with 242 hp (180 kW) and 242 ft·lb (327 N·m) of torque.

== Six-cylinder ==
=== Gasoline ===
==== General Motors ====
- From 1989 to 1990 the 2.8 L (2,838 cc) LL2 V6 with single point fuel injection, producing 122 hp (91 kW) and 204 N⋅m (150 lb⋅ft) of torque was used in the first generation Trooper.
- From 1990 to 1992 the 3.1 L (3,128 cc) LG6 V6 engine with 122 hp (91 kW) and 224 N⋅m (165 lb⋅ft) was used in the Isuzu Rodeo until replaced with the Isuzu-built 3.2L 6VD1 engine.
- The 2003–2008 Isuzu Ascender used the General Motors-built Atlas 4200 Engine with 275 hp (205 kW) and 275 ft·lbf (373 N·m) of torque. For the 2007 model year, the engine received an increase to 291 hp (217 kW) and 277 ft·lb (376 N·m) of torque.
- The 1996–2000 Isuzu Hombre used the General Motors-built Vortec 4300 Engine with 180 hp (134 kW) and 245 ft·lb (332 N·m) of torque.

==== Isuzu V engine ====
The Isuzu V engine is a family of all-aluminum 75° V6 gasoline engines ranging from 3.2 to 3.5 liters.

=== Diesel ===
Designation	Description	Bore	Stroke	Displacement	Power Rating	Torque Rating
D400	Inline-six diesel engine of 3988 cc displacement. First seen in 1968, in the TY-series truck.			3,998 cc (3.998 L; 244.0 cu in)	102 PS (75 kW) at 3400 rpm	25.0 kg⋅m (245 N⋅m; 181 lb⋅ft) at 1800 rpm
DA640	Inline-six, four-stroke diesel engine of 6373 cc displacement.			6,373 cc (6.373 L; 388.9 cu in)	135 PS (99 kW) at 2600 rpm	41.5 kg⋅m (407 N⋅m; 300 lb⋅ft) at 1600 rpm
DH100	Inline-six, four-stroke diesel engine of 10179 cc displacement.			10,179 cc (10.179 L; 621.2 cu in)	195 PS (143 kW) at 2300 rpm	69 kg⋅m (680 N⋅m; 500 lb⋅ft) at 1200 rpm.
E120	Inline-six, four-stroke diesel engine of 12023 cc displacement.			12,023 cc (12.023 L; 733.7 cu in)	260 PS (191 kW) at 2500 rpm	84 kg⋅m (820 N⋅m; 610 lb⋅ft) at 1400 rpm.
6BB1	6-cylinder version of the 4BB1			5,393 cc (5.393 L; 329.1 cu in)	145 PS (107 kW) at 3200 rpm	35 kg⋅m (340 N⋅m; 250 lb⋅ft) at 2000 rpm
6BD1	6-cylinder version of the 4BD1			5,785 cc (5.785 L; 353.0 cu in)	160 PS (118 kW) at 3200 rpm	39 kg⋅m (380 N⋅m; 280 lb⋅ft) at 2000 rpm
6BD1T	6-cylinder version of the 4BD1T			5,785 cc (5.785 L; 353.0 cu in)	180 PS (132 kW) at 3000 rpm 185 PS (136 kW) at 3000 rpm	49 kg⋅m (480 N⋅m; 350 lb⋅ft) at 1800 rpm 53 kg⋅m (520 N⋅m; 380 lb⋅ft) at 1800 rpm
6BF1				6,130 cc (6.13 L; 374 cu in)	170 PS (125 kW) at 3200 rpm	42.5 kg⋅m (420 N⋅m; 310 lb⋅ft)
6BG1	6-cylinder version of the 4BG1.			6,494 cc (6.494 L; 396.3 cu in)	200 PS (147 kW) at 2800 rpm (6BG1-TC/TCE); 175 PS (129 kW) at 3000 rpm / 180 PS (132 kW) at 3000 rpm (6BG1-S); 155 PS (114 kW) at 2800 rpm / 160 PS (118 kW) at 2800 rpm (6BG1-N); 210 PS (154 kW) at 2800 rpm (6BG1-TC1); 230 PS (169 kW) at 2800 rpm (6BG1-TC2)	44 kg⋅m (430 N⋅m; 320 lb⋅ft) / 45 kg⋅m (440 N⋅m; 330 lb⋅ft) at 1800 rpm (6BG1-N); 46 kg⋅m (450 N⋅m; 330 lb⋅ft) / 47 kg⋅m (460 N⋅m; 340 lb⋅ft) at 1800 rpm (6BG1-S); 65 kg⋅m (640 N⋅m; 470 lb⋅ft) at 1700 rpm (6BG1-TC/TCE/TC1); 66 kg⋅m (650 N⋅m; 480 lb⋅ft) at 1700 rpm(6BG1-TC2)
6DE1	DOHC 24V turbocharged engine of 2958 cc displacement. Found in the Euro IV specification Opel Vectra.	87.5 mm (3.44 in)	82 mm (3.2 in)	2,958 cc (2.958 L; 180.5 cu in)	184 PS (135 kW)	400 N⋅m (300 lb⋅ft)
6HE1	6-cylinder version of the 4HE1	110 mm (4.3 in)	125 mm (4.9 in)	7,127 cc (7.127 L; 434.9 cu in)	165 PS (121 kW) at 2800 rpm (6HE1-N, 1989); 195 PS (143 kW) at 2900 rpm(6HE1-S, 1989)	46 kg⋅m (450 N⋅m; 330 lb⋅ft) at 1800 rpm (6HE1-N); 51 kg⋅m (500 N⋅m; 370 lb⋅ft) at 1800 rpm (6HE1-S)
6HE1T	6-cylinder version of the 4HE1T	110 mm (4.3 in)	125 mm (4.9 in)	7,127 cc (7.127 L; 434.9 cu in)	1989 Japanese emission standards: 220 PS (162 kW) at 2700 rpm (6HE1-TCN); 250 PS (184 kW) at 2700 rpm (6HE1-TCS); 1994 Japanese emission standards: 230 PS (169 kW) at 2700 rpm (6HE1-TCN); 260 PS (191 kW) at 2700 rpm (6HE1-TCS)	1989 Japanese emission standards: 66 kg⋅m (650 N⋅m; 480 lb⋅ft) at 1700 rpm (6HE1-TCN); 70 kg⋅m (690 N⋅m; 510 lb⋅ft) at 1700 rpm (6HE1-TCS); 1994 Japanese emission standards: 68 kg⋅m (670 N⋅m; 490 lb⋅ft) at 1400 rpm (6HE1-TCN); 77 kg⋅m (760 N⋅m; 560 lb⋅ft) at 1400 rpm (6HE1-TCS)
6HH1		115 mm (4.5 in)	132 mm (5.2 in)	8,226 cc (8.226 L; 502.0 cu in)	175 PS (129 kW) (6HH1-N, 1994); 185 PS (136 kW) (6HH1-C, 1994); 210 PS (154 kW) (6HH1-S, 1994); 225 PS (165 kW) (6HH1-S, 1998)	50 kg⋅m (490 N⋅m; 360 lb⋅ft) at 1700 rpm (6HH1-N, 1994); 55 kg⋅m (540 N⋅m; 400 lb⋅ft) (6HH1-S and 6HH1-C, 1994); 58 kg⋅m (570 N⋅m; 420 lb⋅ft) (6HH1-S, 1998)
6HK1	6-cylinder version of the 4HK1	115 mm (4.5 in)	125 mm (4.9 in)	7,790 cc (7.79 L; 475 cu in)	205 PS (151 kW) (6HK1-TCR); 240 PS (177 kW) (6HK1-TCN); 260 PS (191 kW) (6HK1-TCC); 280 PS (206 kW) (6HK1-TCS, 1998–1999); 300 PS (221 kW) (6HK1-TCH; 6HK1-TCS, 2005)	KK, KL, PA, PJ Japanese emission codes: 55 kg⋅m (540 N⋅m; 400 lb⋅ft) at 1400 rpm (6HK1-TCR); 70 kg⋅m (690 N⋅m; 510 lb⋅ft) at 1400 rpm (6HK1-TCN); 76 kg⋅m (750 N⋅m; 550 lb⋅ft) at 1400 rpm (6HK1-TCC); 82 kg⋅m (800 N⋅m; 590 lb⋅ft) at 1400 rpm (6HK1-TCS); PDG, PKG Japanese emission codes: 72 kg⋅m (710 N⋅m; 520 lb⋅ft) at 1450 rpm (6HK1-TCN); 78 kg⋅m (760 N⋅m; 560 lb⋅ft) at 1450 rpm (6HK1-TCC); 100 kg⋅m (980 N⋅m; 720 lb⋅ft) at 1450 rpm (6HK1-TCS); SKG Japanese emission code: 76 kg⋅m (750 N⋅m; 550 lb⋅ft) at 1400-2300 rpm (6HK1-TCH); 78 kg⋅m (760 N⋅m; 560 lb⋅ft) at 1450-2200 rpm (6HK1-TCC); 100 kg⋅m (980 N⋅m; 720 lb⋅ft) at 1450 rpm (6HK1-TCS)
6HL1	6-cylinder version of the 4HL1	114 mm (4.5 in)	117 mm (4.6 in)	7,166 cc (7.166 L; 437.3 cu in)	180 PS (132 kW) (6HL1-N); 190 PS (140 kW) (6HL1-S, 2003–2004); 205 PS (151 kW) (6HL1-S, 1998)	50 kg⋅m (490 N⋅m; 360 lb⋅ft) at 1700 rpm (6HL1-N); 51 kg⋅m (500 N⋅m; 370 lb⋅ft) at 1700 rpm (6HL1-S)
6NX1	a 6-cylinder engine found in present-generation Isuzu Giga (in 4x2 and 6x2 rigid chassis.)			7,790 cc (7.79 L; 475 cu in)	340 PS (250 kW)	
6QA1		125 mm (4.9 in)	150 mm (5.9 in)	11,044 cc (11.044 L; 673.9 cu in)	220 PS (162 kW)	
6QA2					220 PS (162 kW)	
6QB2					230 PS (169 kW)	
6RA1		135 mm (5.3 in)	140 mm (5.5 in)	12,024 cc (12.024 L; 733.7 cu in)	285 PS (210 kW) for the turbocharged version	
6RB1		135 mm (5.3 in)	160 mm (6.3 in)	13,741 cc (13.741 L; 838.5 cu in)	320 PS (235 kW) (6RB1-TC1); 340 PS (250 kW) (6RB1-T1)	
6RB2					275 PS (202 kW) at 2700 rpm	
6SA1		115 mm (4.5 in)	135 mm (5.3 in)	8,413 cc (8.413 L; 513.4 cu in)	200 PS (147 kW) at 2700 rpm	58 kg⋅m (570 N⋅m; 420 lb⋅ft) at 1400 rpm
6SD1		120 mm (4.7 in)	145 mm (5.7 in)	9,839 cc (9.839 L; 600.4 cu in)	310 PS (228 kW) (6SD1-TCN); 340 PS (250 kW) (6SD1-TCS)	
6TE1		161 mm (6.3 in)	155 mm (6.1 in)	18,933 cc (18.933 L; 1,155.4 cu in)	330 PS (243 kW); 370 PS (272 kW)	
6UV1	CNG version of the 6UZ1	120 mm (4.7 in)	145 mm (5.7 in)	9,839 cc (9.839 L; 600.4 cu in)	330 PS (243 kW)	
6UZ1	A 6-cylinder diesel engine launched in 2005 using the Giga.	120 mm (4.7 in)	145 mm (5.7 in)	9,839 cc (9.839 L; 600.4 cu in)	Until 2010: 330 PS (243 kW) at 2000 rpm (6UZ1-TCN); 380 PS (279 kW) at 2000 rpm (6UZ1-TCS); From 2010: 330 PS (243 kW) at 1800 rpm (6UZ1-TCN); 380 PS (279 kW) at 1800 rpm (6UZ1-TCS); 400 PS (294 kW) at 1800 rpm (6UZ1-TCH)	Until 2010: 1,422 N⋅m (1,050 lb⋅ft) at 1400 rpm (6UZ1-TCN); 1,765 N⋅m (1,300 lb⋅ft) at 1400 rpm (6UZ1-TCS); From 2010: 1,422 N⋅m (1,050 lb⋅ft) at 1000-1500 rpm (6UZ1-TCN); 1,765 N⋅m (1,300 lb⋅ft) at 1200 rpm for (6UZ1-TCS); 1,765 N⋅m (1,300 lb⋅ft) at 1200 rpm for (6UZ1-TCH)
6WA1		132.9 mm (5.23 in)	145 mm (5.7 in)	12,068 cc (12.068 L; 736.4 cu in)	330 PS (243 kW) (6WA1-TCN); 360 PS (265 kW) (6WA1-TCC); 390 PS (287 kW) (6WA1-TCS)	
6WF1		147 mm (5.8 in)	140 mm (5.5 in)	14,256 cc (14.256 L; 870.0 cu in)	320 PS (235 kW) (6WF1-TCN); 370 PS (272 kW)(6WF1-TC)	
6WG1	a 6-cylinder engine found in Isuzu E-Series tractor.	147 mm (5.8 in)	154 mm (6.1 in)	15,681 cc (15.681 L; 956.9 cu in)	(6WG1-T); 290 PS (213 kW)1818rpm . (6WG1-TCX); 400 PS (294 kW) 2200 rpm . (6WG1-TCR); 420 PS (309 kW) 2100rpm. (6WG1-TCC); 520 PS (382 kW) 2200 rpm(6WG1-TCS)	

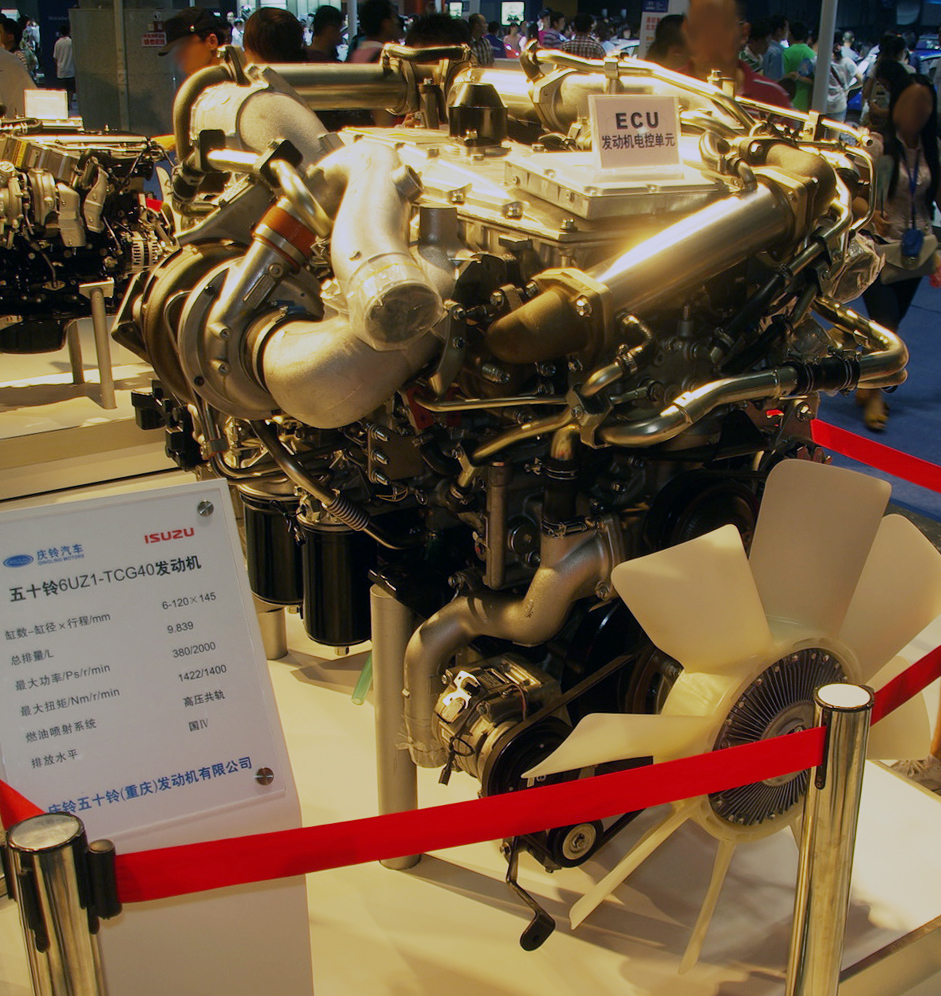
380 PS 6UZ1-TCG40 diesel engine

== Eight-cylinder ==
=== Gasoline ===
- The 2002–2007 Isuzu Ascender use the General Motors-built Vortec 5300 Engine with 285 hp (213 kW) and 325 ft·lb (441 N·m) of torque.
- Isuzu Commercial trucks use the General Motors-built Vortec 6000 Engine with 300 hp (224 kW) and 360 ft·lb (488 N·m) of torque.
- 2023–2025 Commercial trucks use the General Motors-built 6.6 L L8T with 350 hp (261 kW) and 425 ft·lb (576 N·m) of torque.

=== Diesel ===
- The 8PA1 is a 10.0 L (9,971 cc) V8 diesel truck engine. It has 215 PS (158 kW) at 2800 rpm and 62.0 kg⋅m (608 N⋅m; 448 lb⋅ft) at 1600 rpm.
- The 8GF1 (Duramax) is a 6.6 L (6,600 cc) V8 diesel truck engine. It has 360 hp (268 kW) at 3200 rpm and 89.0 kg⋅m (873 N⋅m; 644 lb⋅ft) at 1600 rpm.

- Isuzu had the design responsibility of the base engine, while GM Truck Group was responsible for designing the installation and packaging within the vehicle. Engine validation relied on Isuzu's proven validation process, in addition to GM Powertrain's expertise in engine validation. Engine calibration work in the vehicle was undertaken by a joint team of Isuzu, GM Powertrain and GM Truck Group personnel, which reflects how the engine was born as a complete collaboration of the three organizations.

== Twelve-cylinder ==
=== Gasoline ===
Designation	Description	Bore	Stroke	Displacement	Power Rating	Torque Rating
P799WE	12-cylinder Formula One racing engine used in the Lotus 102B; but developed from 1989 to 1991.	85 mm (3.3 in)	51.3 mm (2.02 in)	3,500 cc (3.5 L; 210 cu in)	649–775 PS (477–570 kW)	401–418 N⋅m (296–308 lb⋅ft)

=== Diesel ===
Designation	Description	Bore	Stroke	Displacement	Power Rating	Torque Rating
12PA1	12-cylinder engine used in the Isuzu New Power from February 1976 to August 1983.	115 mm (4.5 in)	120 mm (4.7 in)	14,957 cc (14.957 L; 912.7 cu in)	350 PS (257 kW); 385 PS (283 kW)	
12PB1	12-cylinder engine used in the Isuzu New Power from December 1979 to August 1983.	115 mm (4.5 in)	135 mm (5.3 in)	16,827 cc (16.827 L; 1,026.8 cu in)	350 PS (257 kW); 385 PS (283 kW)	
12PC1	12-cylinder engine used in the Isuzu 810 from 1983 to 1989.	119 mm (4.7 in)	135 mm (5.3 in)	18,018 cc (18.018 L; 1,099.5 cu in)	355 PS (261 kW) (12PC1-N); 395 PS (291 kW) (12PC1-S)	
12PD1	12-cylinder engine used in the Isuzu 810 from 1989 to 1994.	119 mm (4.7 in)	150 mm (5.9 in)	20,020 cc (20.02 L; 1,222 cu in)	365 PS (268 kW) (12PD1-N); 395 PS (291 kW) (12PD1-C); 425 PS (313 kW) (12PD1-S)	
12PE1	12-cylinder engine used in the Isuzu Giga from 1994 to 2000.	127 mm (5.0 in)	150 mm (5.9 in)	22,801 cc (22.801 L; 1,391.4 cu in)	385 PS (283 kW)	
