= Isuzu V12 F1 engine =

Isuzu P799WE
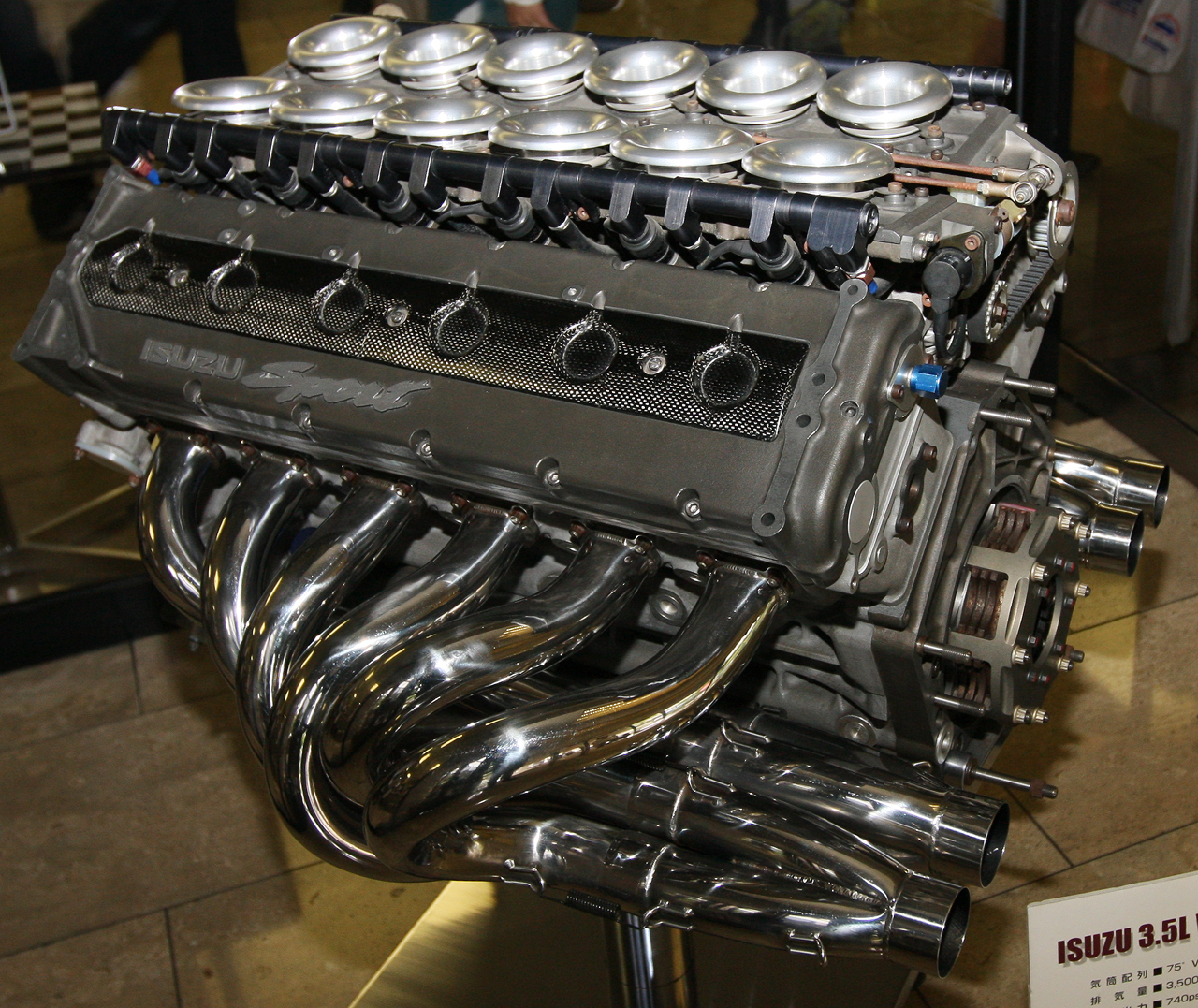

Overview
- Manufacturer: Isuzu
- Production: 1989–1991

Layout
- Configuration: 75° V12
- Displacement: 3.5 L (3,493 cc; 213.2 cu in)
- Cylinder bore: 85 mm (3.35 in)
- Piston stroke: 51.3 mm (2.02 in)
- Valvetrain: 48-valve, DOHC, four-valves per cylinder
- Compression ratio: 13.0:1

Combustion
- Fuel system: Port fuel injection
- Fuel type: Gasoline
- Oil system: Dry sump

Output
- Power output: 640–765 hp (477–570 kW)
- Torque output: 296–308 lb⋅ft (401–418 N⋅m)

Dimensions
- Length: 690 mm (27.2 in)
- Width: 580 mm (22.8 in)
- Height: 495 mm (19.5 in)
- Dry weight: 158 kg (348 lb)

Isuzu made an experimental 75-degree, four-stroke, naturally-aspirated, V-12 racing engine, dubbed the P799WE, designed for Formula One racing; between 1989 and 1991. The experimental unit was used in the Lotus 102B and Lotus 102C.

== Background ==
The 102B enabled the team to equal their 1990 points total of three points. With increased sponsorship and the delay of the 107 it was to continue racing for the first four races of the 1992 season in D specification. The C specification incorporated an Isuzu P799WE (Japanese edition) V12 engine that had been developed throughout the season but never raced. The new engine produced impressive power, with rumours of around 750bhp reported. In the engine's one and only track test, the car was six seconds off the pace however. Ultimately, Peter Collins, team principal of Team Lotus, decided against a deal to use the unproven engine and Isuzu decided against entering Formula One anyway.

=== Specifications ===
- Overall length: 690 mm (27.2 in)
- Overall width: 580 mm (22.8 in)
- Overall height: 495 mm (19.5 in)
- Number of cylinders: V-type 12 cylinders
- Cylinder bank angle: 75°
- Displacement: 3.5 L (3,493 cc; 213.2 cu in)
- Maximum horsepower: 646 hp (482 kW) at 12,000 rpm (early), 765 hp (570 kW) at 13,500 rpm (late)
- Maximum torque: 41.0 kg⋅m (402 N⋅m; 297 lb⋅ft) at 10,000 rpm (early), 42.5 kg⋅m (417 N⋅m; 307 lb⋅ft) at 11,500 rpm (late)
- Piston: bore 85 mm (3.35 in)
- Stroke: 51.3 mm (2.02 in)
- Compression ratio: 13.0:1
- Weight: 158 kg (348 lb)

== Applications ==
- Lotus 102B
- Lotus 102C
