= Lotus 107 =

Formula One car

Lotus 107 Lotus 107B Lotus 107C
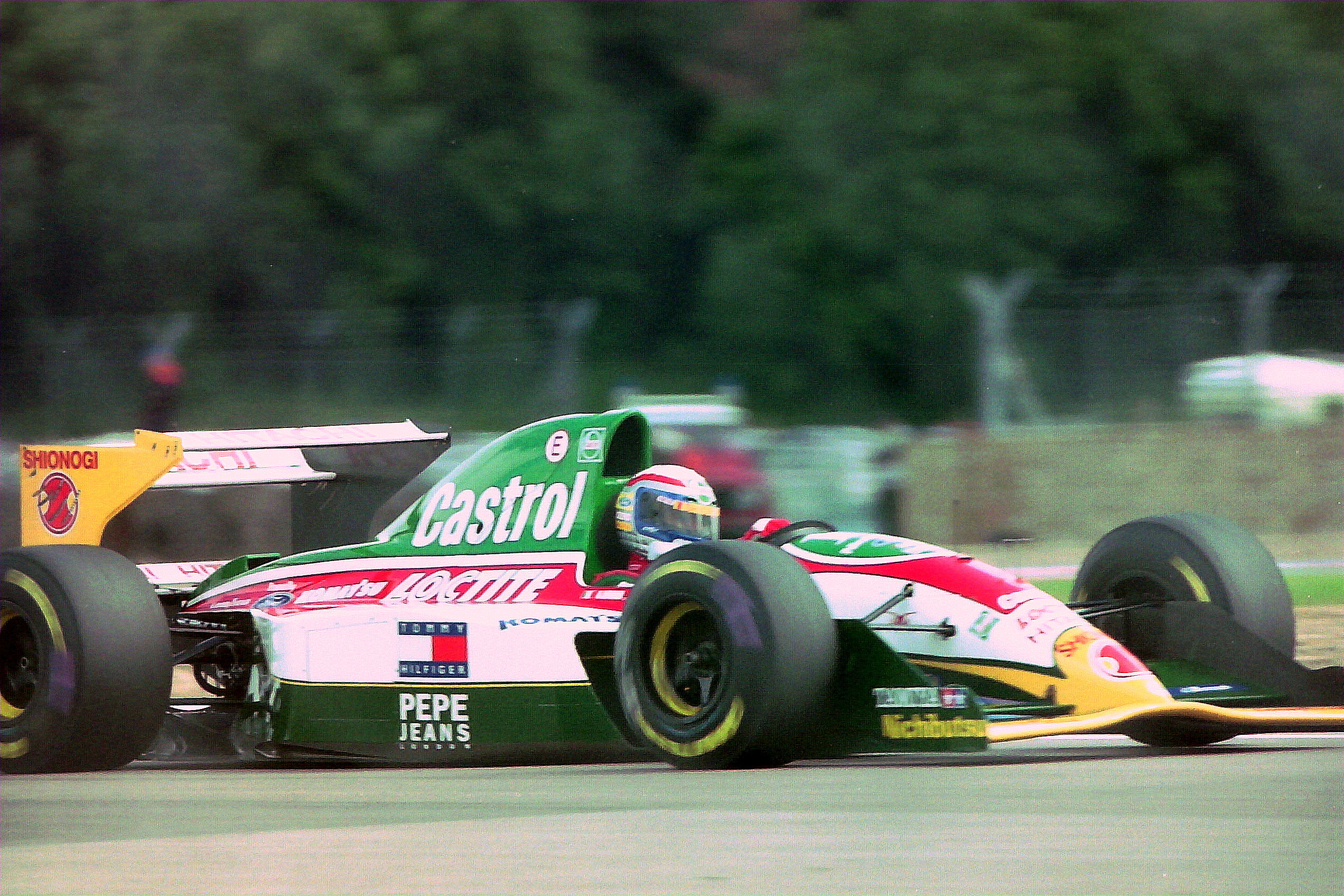
- Alessandro Zanardi driving the 107B during the practice session for the 1993 British Grand Prix
- Category: Formula One
- Constructor: Team Lotus
- Designers: Peter Wright (Technical Director); Chris Murphy (Chief Designer); Mark Hennings (Head of Aerodynamics)
- Predecessor: 102D
- Successor: 109

Technical specifications
- Chassis: Carbon fibre monocoque
- Suspension (front): 1992-1993: Active suspension 1994: Double wishbone, pushrod.
- Suspension (rear): 1992-1993: Active suspension 1994: Double wishbone, pushrod.
- Engine: 1992-1993: Ford HBA6 3,494 cc (213.2 cu in), 75° V8, NA, mid-engine, longitudinally mounted. 1994: Mugen-Honda MF-351HC 3,500 cc (213.6 cu in), ° V10, NA, mid-engine, longitudinally-mounted
- Transmission: Lotus / Xtrac 6-speed semi-automatic
- Power: 700 hp @ 13,000 rpm (Ford-Cosworth V8), 725 hp @ 13,500 rpm (Mugen-Honda V10)
- Fuel: BP (1992); Castrol (1992–1993); Mobil 1 (1994)
- Tyres: Goodyear

Competition history
- Notable entrants: Team Lotus Ford; Team Lotus Mugen-Honda
- Notable drivers: 11. (Finland) Mika Häkkinen; 11. / 12. (United Kingdom) Johnny Herbert; 12. (Italy) Alessandro Zanardi; 12. (Portugal) Pedro Lamy
- Debut: 1992 San Marino Grand Prix
- Last event: 1994 Canadian Grand Prix
Races	Wins	Podiums	Poles	F/Laps
34	0	0	0	0
- Constructors' Championships: 0
- Drivers' Championships: 0

The Lotus 107 was a Formula One car used by Team Lotus. Designed for the 1992 Formula One season, and used throughout most of 1992, 1993 and part of 1994, it brought in a final, albeit short-lived period of competitiveness for the team in Formula One.

== Design ==
The 107 is attributed to the design work of Chris Murphy and his design team. Murphy joined Lotus after Akira Akagi's arrest and the Leyton House team he owned was thrown into turmoil. Murphy had designed the 1991 car; the 107 looked very similar to his earlier design, leading some to say that the new Lotus was simply a rebadged Leyton House. The 107 was designed from the outset to run a ride height control system which Lotus described as "fast ride height". This used conventional helical spring/concentric damper units in series with single acting hydraulic actuators. Whilst the "fast ride height" concept was good and copied by many other teams the following season, the 107 installation was fundamentally flawed and the car only ran in this form at its debut in Imola and practice in Monaco. After that it was disabled for the remainder of the season.

The 107 had smooth sweeping lines quite different from the long developed and antiquated Lotus 102D, whose heritage can be traced to the 1990 Formula One season. The installation of the Ford Cosworth HB V8 engines, of a similar – if older – specification to those being used by Benetton, was complete by the unveiling of the car at the 1992 San Marino Grand Prix.

Johnny Herbert liked the car very much, saying it was sublime to drive and responsive to set up changes, but admitted it was not reliable.

== Development ==
With a top notch driving squad of Johnny Herbert and the future double F1 World Champion Mika Häkkinen, the Lotuses were able to bring in some good results: at several races the twin cars were able to run in formation on the tail of the leading pack, at least in the early parts of the races. Reliability was limited. Häkkinen provided Lotus' best showing for several years at the Hungarian Grand Prix where he diced for the final podium position with Gerhard Berger's McLaren. In Portugal he ran as high as second before having to make a pit stop for new tyres late in the race. A further potential podium place in Japan was also lost.

== Variants ==
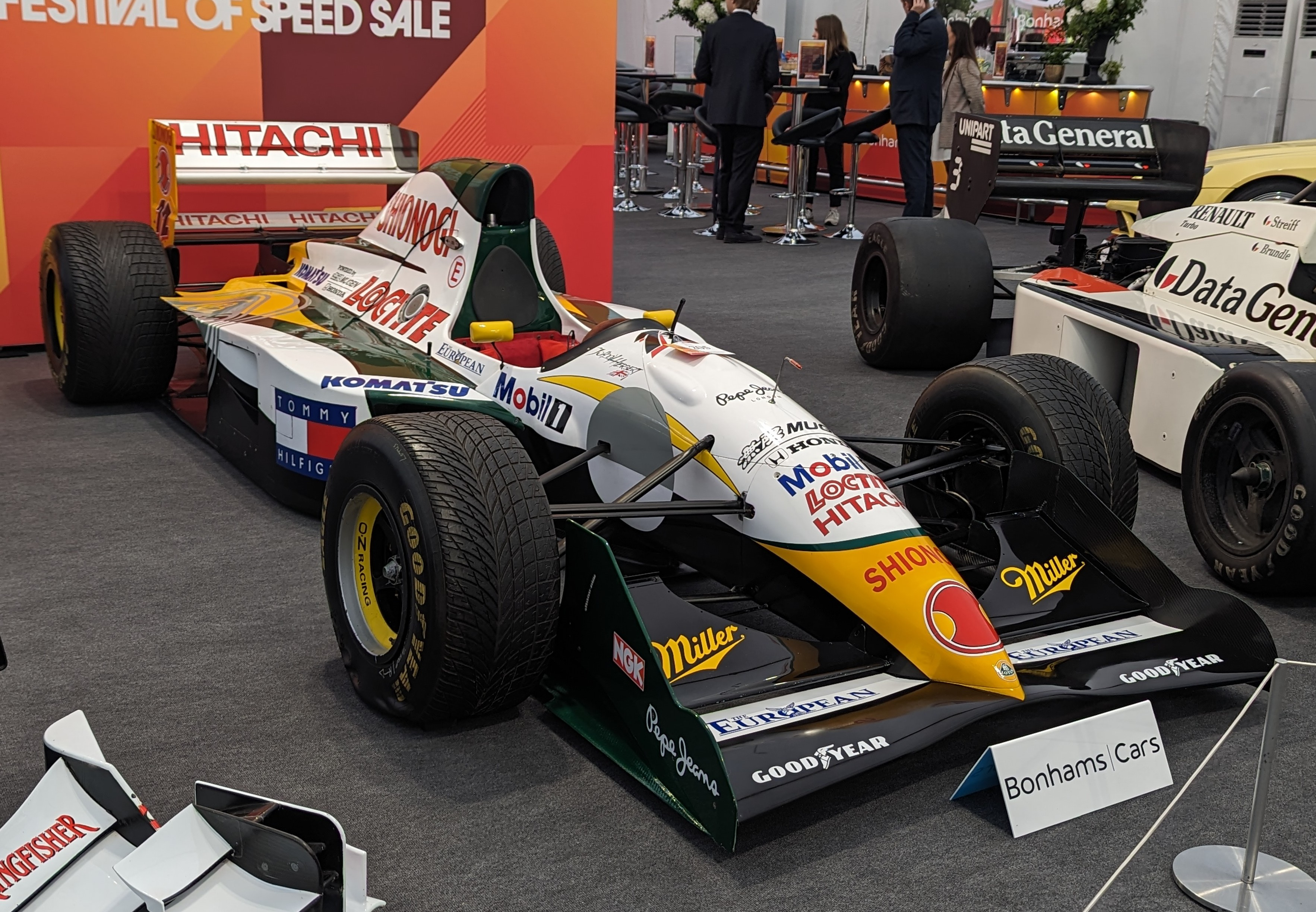
Lotus 107C

The car was developed over succeeding seasons into B and C variants, the latter with Mugen-Honda power in place of the Cosworth. As was standard practice at the time, the team employed the active suspension technology that they had introduced to F1 back in 1987 on later variants. However, the budget was not enough to make it work fully, and by then it was far from being a unique capability. According to Alex Zanardi's autobiography My Story, the focus on this system was to the detriment of other aspects of the car.

The team's financial difficulties dragged it under at the end of 1994. The Lotus 109, the last Formula One car of the team, which ran in the latter part of 1994, was a further derivative of this design.

== Complete Formula One results ==
(key)

Year	Entrant	Chassis	Engine	Tyres	Drivers	1	2	3	4	5	6	7	8	9	10	11	12	13	14	15	16	Points	WCC
1992	Team Lotus	107	Ford HB; V8	G		RSA	MEX	BRA	ESP	SMR	MON	CAN	FRA	GBR	GER	HUN	BEL	ITA	POR	JPN	AUS	13*	5th
1992	Team Lotus	107	Ford HB; V8	G	Mika Häkkinen						Ret	Ret	4	6	Ret	4	6	Ret	5	Ret	7	13*	5th
1992	Team Lotus	107	Ford HB; V8	G	Johnny Herbert					Ret	Ret	Ret	6	Ret	Ret	Ret	13	Ret	Ret	Ret	13	13*	5th
1993	Team Lotus	107B	Ford HB; V8	G		RSA	BRA	EUR	SMR	ESP	MON	CAN	FRA	GBR	GER	HUN	BEL	ITA	POR	JPN	AUS	12	6th
1993	Team Lotus	107B	Ford HB; V8	G	Johnny Herbert	Ret	4	4	8	Ret	Ret	10	Ret	4	10	Ret	5	Ret	Ret	11	Ret	12	6th
1993	Team Lotus	107B	Ford HB; V8	G	Alessandro Zanardi	Ret	6	8	Ret	14	7	11	Ret	Ret	Ret	Ret	DNQ					12	6th
1993	Team Lotus	107B	Ford HB; V8	G	Pedro Lamy													11	Ret	13	Ret	12	6th
1994	Team Lotus	107C	Mugen-Honda V10	G		BRA	PAC	SMR	MON	ESP	CAN	FRA	GBR	GER	HUN	BEL	ITA	POR	EUR	JPN	AUS	0	-
1994	Team Lotus	107C	Mugen-Honda V10	G	Johnny Herbert	7	7	10	Ret													0	-
1994	Team Lotus	107C	Mugen-Honda V10	G	Pedro Lamy	10	8	Ret	11													0	-
1994	Team Lotus	107C	Mugen-Honda V10	G	Alessandro Zanardi					9	15											0	-

- 2 points scored in 1992 with the Lotus 102D
