= Lotus 102 =

Lotus 102 Lotus 102B Lotus 102D
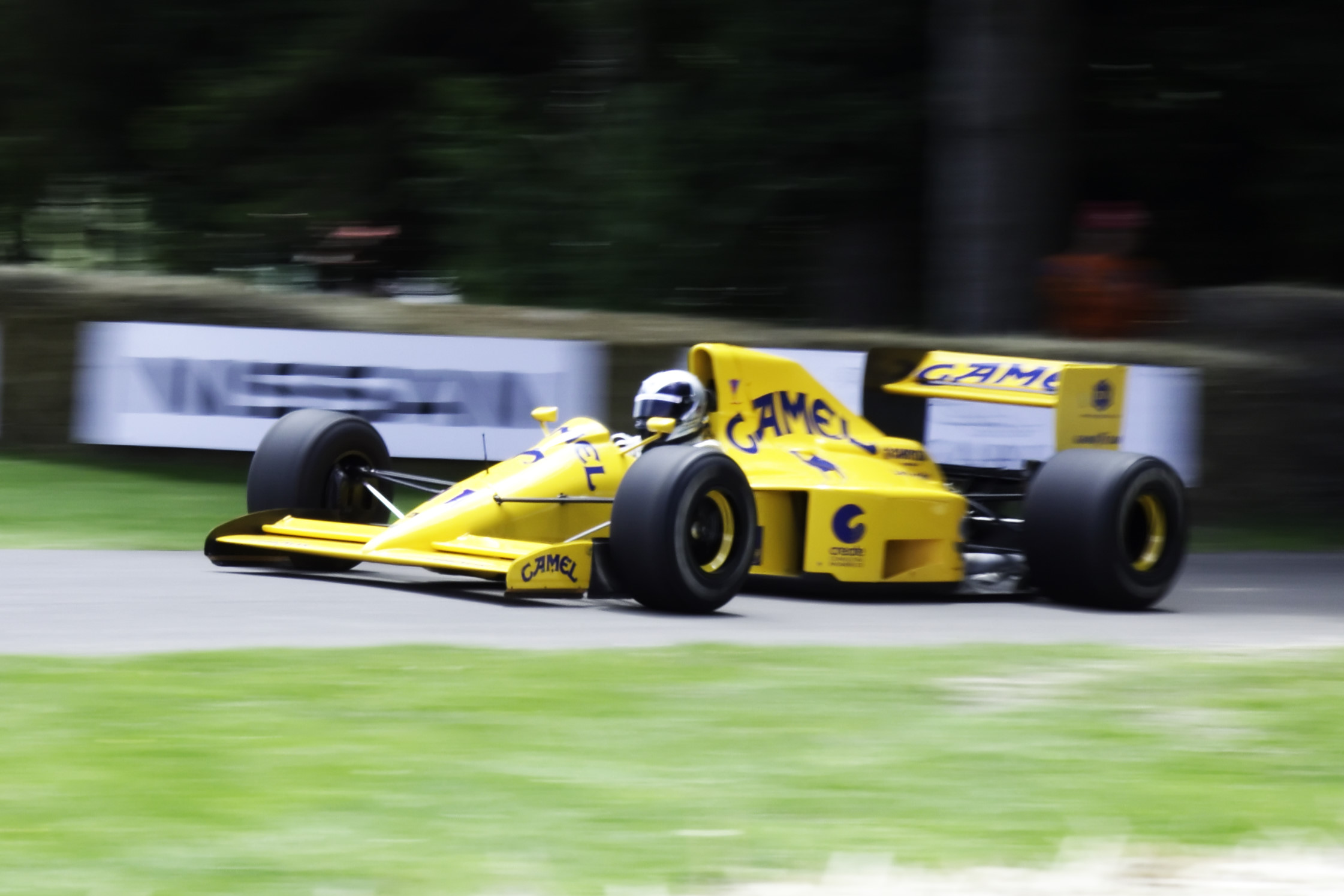
- The demonstration of the 102 at the Goodwood Festival of Speed
- Category: Formula One
- Constructor: Lotus
- Designers: Frank Dernie (Technical Director); Mike Coughlan (Chief Designer); Mauro Forghieri (Chief Engine Designer (Lamborghini))
- Predecessor: 101
- Successor: 107

Technical specifications
- Chassis: Carbon fibre monocoque
- Suspension (front): Double wishbones, pull-rod dampers
- Suspension (rear): Double wishbones, push-rod dampers
- Engine: 1990: Lamborghini LE3512, 3,493 cc (213.2 cu in), mid-engine, longitudinally mounted, NA 80° V12; 1991: Judd EV, 3,496 cc (213.3 cu in), mid-engine, longitudinally mounted, NA 76° V8; 1992: Ford HBA5, 3,494 cc (213.2 cu in), mid-engine, longitudinally mounted, 75° NA V8
- Transmission: Lotus / Lamborghini 6 speed manual
- Fuel: BP
- Tyres: Goodyear

Competition history
- Notable entrants: Camel Team Lotus (1990); Team Lotus
- Notable drivers: 11. (United Kingdom) Derek Warwick; 11. (Finland) Mika Häkkinen; 12. (United Kingdom) Martin Donnelly; 12. (United Kingdom) Johnny Herbert; 12. (United Kingdom) Julian Bailey; 12. (Germany) Michael Bartels
- Debut: 1990 United States Grand Prix
- Last event: 1992 Australian Grand Prix
Races	Wins	Podiums	Poles	F/Laps
37	0	0	0	0
- Constructors' Championships: 0
- Drivers' Championships: 0

The Lotus 102 was a Formula One racing car designed by Lotus for use in the 1990 Formula One season and would eventually go on to compete in three seasons until 1992.

== Development ==
Frank Dernie and Mike Coughlan incorporated the 640 bhp (477 kW; 649 PS) Lamborghini V12 engine that had been used by the Larrousse Lola team during 1989. Its use made the 102 the only Lotus to race with a V12 engine. The engine had several drawbacks, principally its size, weight and fuel economy. However, it was believed that the increases in power would offset these drawbacks. The engine's size meant it had to be located lower in the chassis, which also had to be designed to its widest permitted dimensions in order to incorporate larger fuel tanks. Furthermore, due to the engine's mass every component on the car had to be scrutinised to investigate whether any further weight reductions could be made elsewhere.

The departure of Nelson Piquet to Benetton and Satoru Nakajima to Tyrrell at the end of 1989 brought in the experienced Derek Warwick, and promoted test driver Martin Donnelly to fill the other vacant drivers seat. The inclusion of these drivers, who were taller than Piquet and Nakajima, incurred another design compromise as the car had to be taller than was desired.

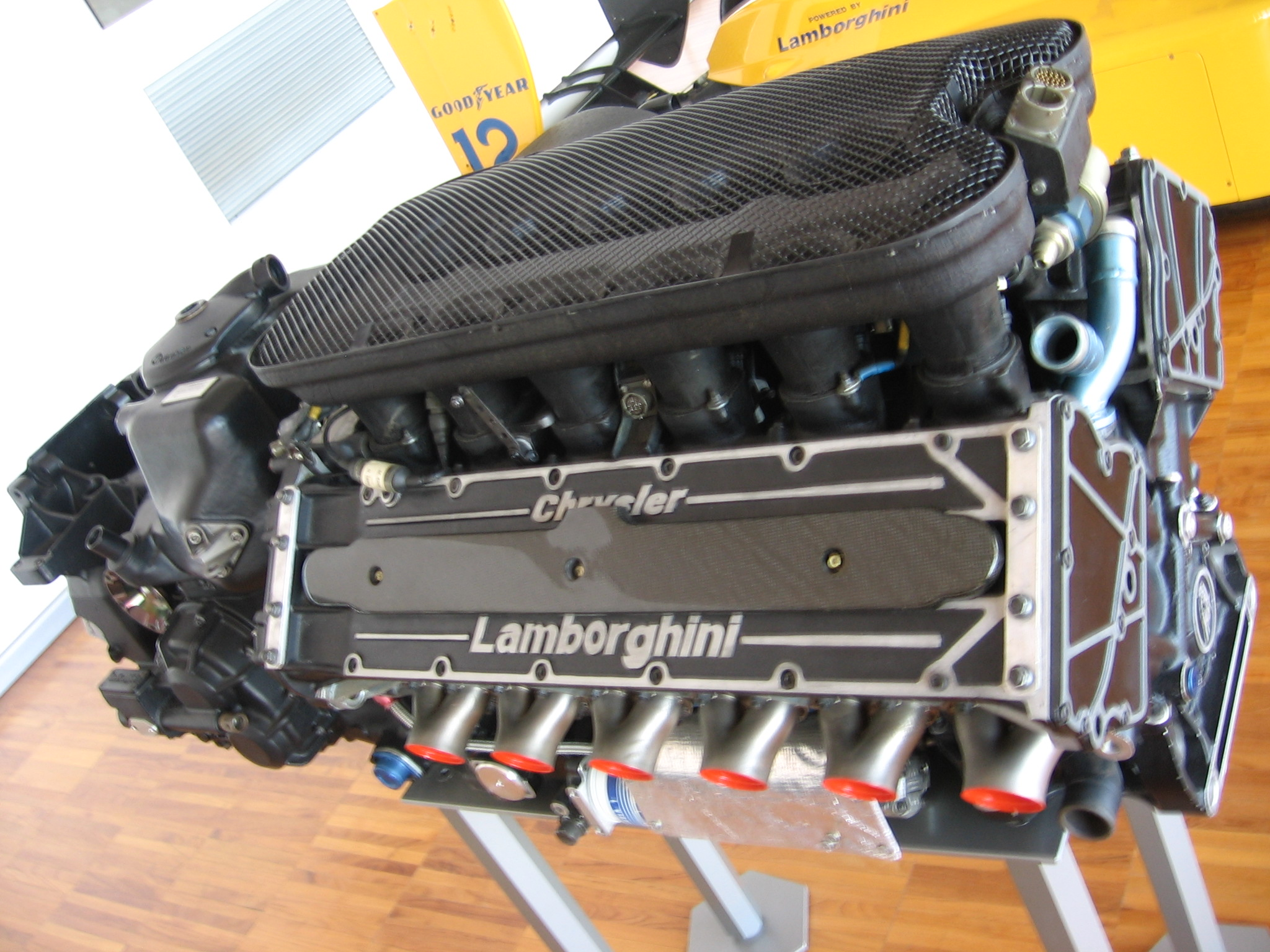
The Lamborghini 3512 V12 engine as used in the Lotus 102 in 1990

Former boss Peter Warr had been close to negotiating large sponsorship deals with Coca-Cola and BP fuels for 1990, but the fallout from the DeLorean scandal nixed those plans, leaving the team underfunded.

Team Lotus's manager Rupert Mainwarring confidently predicted that the team would score 40 championship points. By the first round of the championship it was apparent that this confidence was sadly misplaced.

== Racing history ==
=== 1990 ===
Team Lotus were to struggle throughout the season to score three points, its lowest score since 1958. Warwick scored all three points with a 6th place in Canada and a 5th-place finish in Hungary, while Donnelly failed to score at all. More often than not, it was the unreliability of the Lamborghini 3512 engine which cost Lotus in 1990. Ultimately this performance was to witness the departure of the lucrative Camel sponsorship the team had enjoyed since 1987 and almost cost the team its existence. Ironically, the planned use of the Lamborghini V12 was also the major reason why triple World Champion Nelson Piquet chose not to re-sign with the team after 1989 with the Brazilian correctly predicting that the under-developed engine would hamper both his and the team's chances. While the Lamborghini, one of only two V12 engines in Formula One at the time (the other being Ferrari), had shown promise with the Larrousse team in its debut season 1989, it still lagged behind the V12 Ferrari, the V10 engines from Honda and Renault, and even the Cosworth built and developed Ford V8 engine in both power (it only produced around 620 bhp (462 kW; 629 PS) compared to the closer to 700 bhp (522 kW; 710 PS) for Honda, Renault and Ferrari) and more importantly reliability. Derek Warwick disliked the car, feeling the engine was poor and the monocoque was unsafe stating: I didn't like to drive it. I was scared to be in it.

The 102 ultimately saw the end of Martin Donnelly's brief F1 career in a crash which almost cost him his life. During the 1990 Spanish Grand Prix at Jerez, Donnelly had a horrific crash during Friday practice when he left the circuit in the fast right hand turn behind the pits and the car hit the barriers at speed. The poor build quality of the car was proven in the horrific impact. The 102 broke in half and the seat of the car broke free and was flung clear of the wreck with Martin still strapped in. Donnelly, who ended up lying in the middle of the track, received serious injuries that took months of recovery. Two races previous in Italy, Warwick also had a monumental crash on the first lap of the race at Monza when he ran wide on the exit to the Parabolica and clouted the barriers at speed. Although the car overturned and slid down the middle of the circuit upside down, Warwick was unharmed. He climbed out of his car, which following cars avoided, ran back to the pits (where he told the team and reporters that the crash was his own fault for running too wide at the Parabolica) and started the race in the spare car.

After Donnelly's career ending crash at Jerez, he was replaced for the final two races in Japan and Australia by British driver Johnny Herbert.

In December 1990, Peter Collins and Peter Wright headed a consortium which bought the team. Due to the timing of the takeover the team were unable to start the season with sufficient sponsorship. In addition, the planned introduction of Dernie's type 103 was shelved, the team instead opting to refresh the 102 to B standards.

In a 2014 interview when talking about his time at Lotus and with the Lamborghini engine, Derek Warwick said that the car was poor and that it would "flex all over the place, it would break, it was unreliable" before adding that the V12 engine was "all noise and no go".

=== 1991 ===
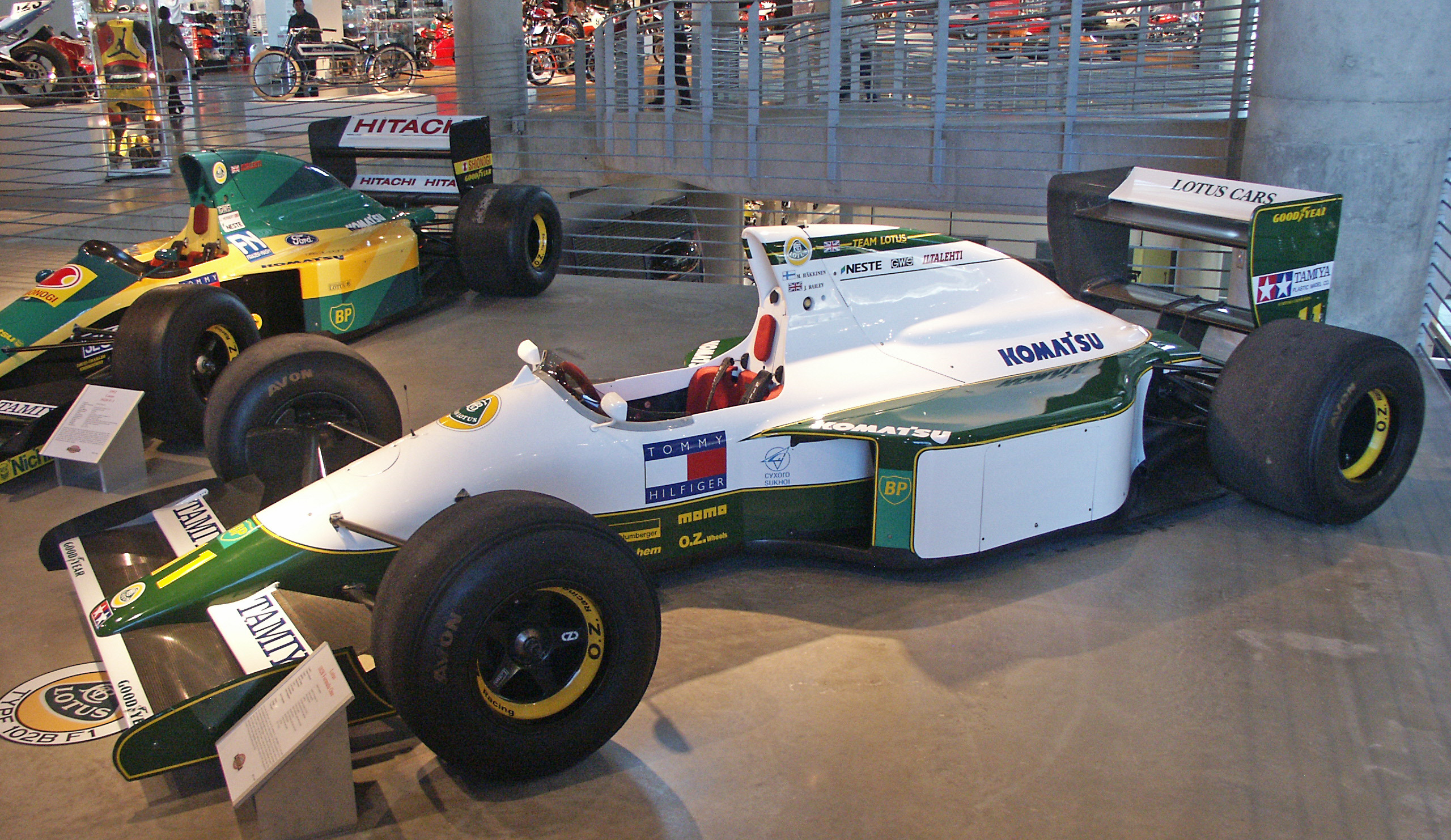
Lotus 102B

The Lotus 102B was Team Lotus's entry to the 1991 season. Despite having over 800 new components incorporated the new car was not sufficiently different from the 102 to justify a new type designation. This continued the precedent set by Lotus 30 years previously, whereby the Type 25 was almost completely redesigned, but was still designated the 25B.

The heavy and ultimately unreliable (in Lotus usage at least; the Larrouse-Lola outfit found better results having used the engine since 1989) Lamborghini engine was replaced by the Judd EV V8, the successor of the Judd CV V8 that had been used in the 101 in 1989. The driver line-up was also changed. Martin Donnelly stated that he was due to be kept on for 1991 as lead driver, but the injuries he sustained in his accident at Jerez the previous year put paid to that. Future world champion Mika Häkkinen and Julian Bailey filled the seats vacated by a frustrated Derek Warwick and injured Donnelly. It was apparent that the car was nowhere near the pace setters of the McLaren MP4/6 and the Williams FW14 at the opening round in Phoenix. The quality control was still not up to standard; Häkkinen would go on to describe that during this race his steering wheel actually came off. Bailey's failure to qualify for the Monaco Grand Prix prompted his departure and replacement with test driver Johnny Herbert for the remainder of the season. Due to Herbert's Japanese Formula 3000 commitments the German driver Michael Bartels raced in his absence but failed to qualify.

The 102B enabled the team to equal their 1990 points total of three points. With increased sponsorship and the delay of the 107 it was to continue racing for the first four races of the 1992 season in D specification. The C specification incorporated the P799WE Isuzu V12 F1 engine that had been developed throughout the season but never raced. The new engine produced impressive power, with rumours of around 750bhp reported. In the engine's one and only track test, the car was six seconds off the pace however. Ultimately, Collins decided against a deal to use the unproven engine and Isuzu decided against entering Formula One anyway.

=== 1992 ===
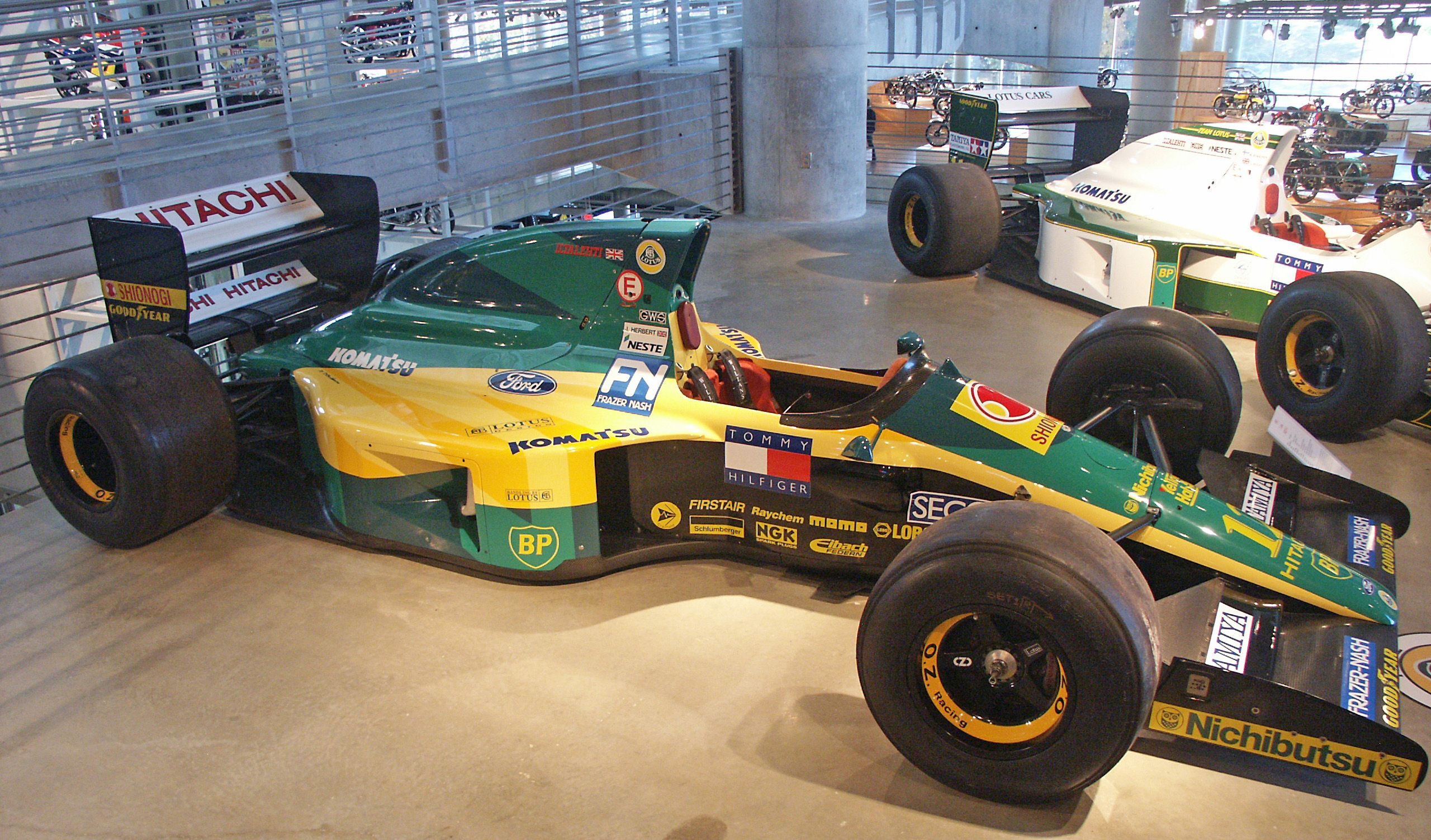
Lotus 102D

The final incarnation of the 102, was the makeshift 102D that represented Team Lotus for the start of the 1992 season due to the late arrival of the 107. Outwardly similar to the 102B, the car had a Cosworth HB V8 in place of the Judd EV V8. The cars themselves were much as had been run in 1991 other than the parts required to adapt the HB engine to the Lamborghini gearbox and the ED engine mounting points on the chassis. Despite its lack of development and many shortcomings the car achieved 6th place finishes in the first two races of 1992. In an attempt to gain exposure a 102D driven by Johnny Herbert broke the Brands Hatch Indy circuit record for the BBC Record Breakers programme.

== Complete results ==
(key)

Year	Entrant	Chassis	Engine	Tyres	Drivers	1	2	3	4	5	6	7	8	9	10	11	12	13	14	15	16	Pts.	WCC
1990	Camel Team Lotus	102	Lamborghini 3512; V12	G		USA	BRA	SMR	MON	CAN	MEX	FRA	GBR	GER	HUN	BEL	ITA	POR	ESP	JPN	AUS	3	8th
1990	Camel Team Lotus	102	Lamborghini 3512; V12	G	Derek Warwick	Ret	Ret	7	Ret	6	10	11	Ret	8	5	11	Ret	Ret	Ret	Ret	Ret	3	8th
1990	Camel Team Lotus	102	Lamborghini 3512; V12	G	Martin Donnelly	DNS	Ret	8	Ret	Ret	8	12	Ret	Ret	7	12	Ret	Ret	DNS			3	8th
1990	Camel Team Lotus	102	Lamborghini 3512; V12	G	Johnny Herbert															Ret	Ret	3	8th
1991	Team Lotus	102B	Judd EV; V8	G		USA	BRA	SMR	MON	CAN	MEX	FRA	GBR	GER	HUN	BEL	ITA	POR	ESP	JPN	AUS	3	9th
1991	Team Lotus	102B	Judd EV; V8	G	Mika Häkkinen	13	9	5	Ret	Ret	9	DNQ	12	Ret	14	Ret	14	14	Ret	Ret	19	3	9th
1991	Team Lotus	102B	Judd EV; V8	G	Julian Bailey	DNQ	DNQ	6	DNQ													3	9th
1991	Team Lotus	102B	Judd EV; V8	G	Johnny Herbert					DNQ	10	10	14			7		Ret		Ret	11	3	9th
1991	Team Lotus	102B	Judd EV; V8	G	Michael Bartels									DNQ	DNQ		DNQ		DNQ			3	9th
1992	Team Lotus	102D	Ford HB; V8	G		RSA	MEX	BRA	ESP	SMR	MON	CAN	FRA	GBR	GER	HUN	BEL	ITA	POR	JPN	AUS	13*	5th
1992	Team Lotus	102D	Ford HB; V8	G	Mika Häkkinen	9	6	10	Ret	DNQ												13*	5th
1992	Team Lotus	102D	Ford HB; V8	G	Johnny Herbert	6	7	Ret	Ret													13*	5th

* 11 points scored in 1992 using the Lotus 107.
