= Isuzu VehiCROSS =

Compact SUV

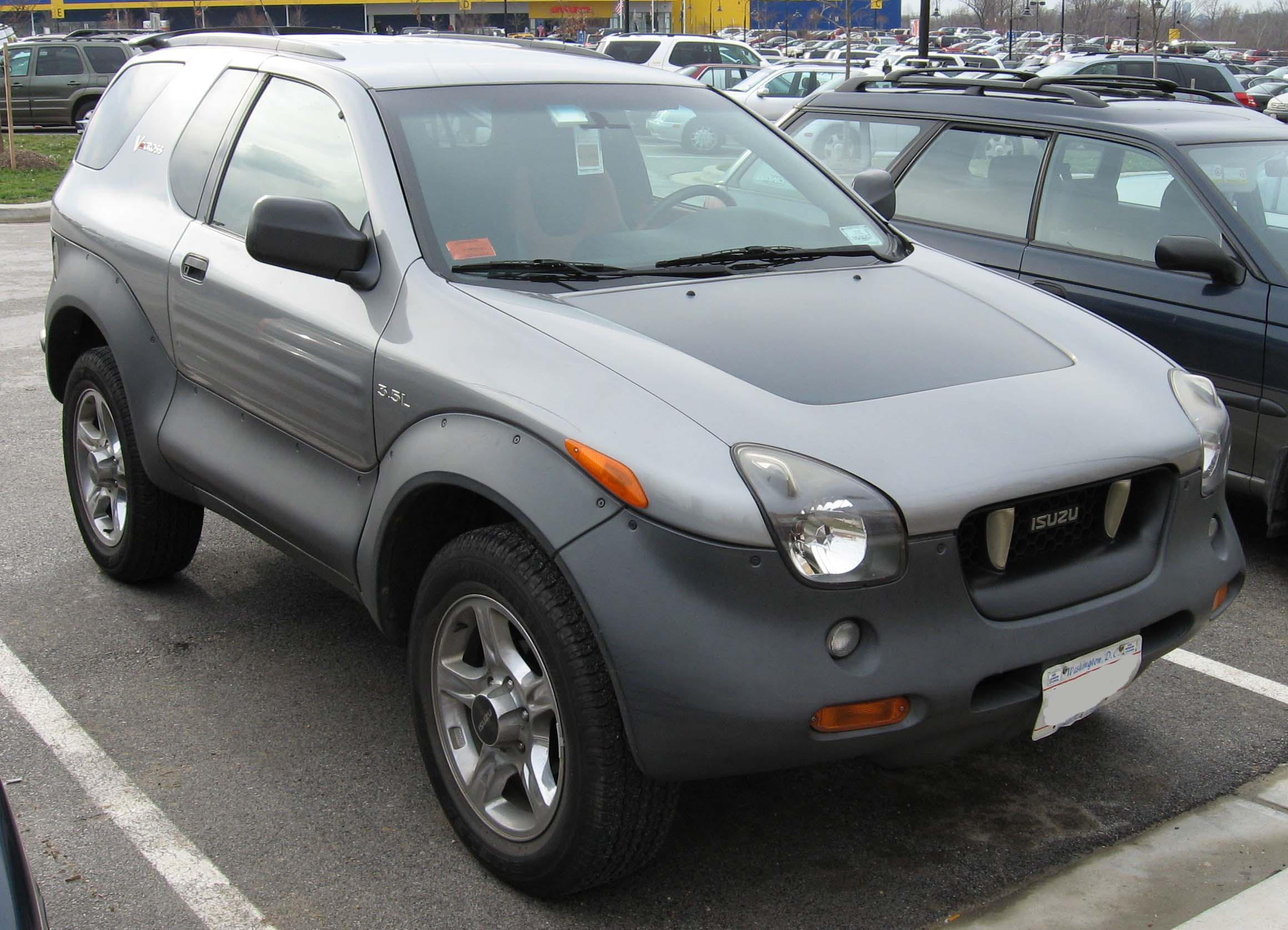

Overview
- Manufacturer: Isuzu
- Also called: Isuzu VX (concept car); Isuzu Tiejingang (China)
- Production: 1997–2001 (5,958 units); * 1,805 units in Japan; * 4,153 units in United States
- Model years: 1997–1999 (Japan); 1999–2001 (United States)
- Assembly: Japan: Fujisawa, Kanagawa (Fujisawa Plant); China: Chongqing
- Designer: Shiro Nakamura and Satomi Murayama (chief designer); Simon Cox, Joji Yanaka, Andrew Hill and Nick Robinson

Body and chassis
- Class: Compact SUV
- Body style: 3-door SUV
- Layout: Front-engine, rear-wheel-drive or four-wheel drive
- Chassis: Body-on-frame
- Related: Isuzu Trooper

Powertrain
- Engine: Gasoline: 3.2 L 6VD1 V6; 3.5 L 6VE1 V6
- Transmission: 4-speed automatic

Dimensions
- Wheelbase: 2,332 mm (91.8 in)
- Length: 4,130 mm (162.6 in)
- Width: 1,791 mm (70.5 in)
- Height: 1,699 mm (66.9 in)
- Curb weight: 1,794 kg (3,955 lb)

Chronology
- Successor: Isuzu MU/Rodeo Sport

The Isuzu VehiCROSS is a compact SUV manufactured by Isuzu from 1997 through 2001 (Japanese market 1997–1999; US market 1999–2001). The Isuzu VehiCROSS share a platform with the short wheelbase variant Isuzu Trooper second generation.

== Design ==
The VehiCROSS is a compact 3-door SUV with aggressive external styling, including short overhangs, an aggressive forward stance, titanium "teeth" in the grille, a black hood-insert, and black plastic cladding over the entire lower half of the vehicle. The US-market model came equipped with 16" polished wheels in 1999 and 18" chrome wheels during the remainder of production, whereas the Japanese model came equipped with 16" alloys with chrome center caps.

The design team for the VehiCROSS, led by Shiro Nakamura and Satomi Murayama, chief designer/manager at Isuzu's European office in Brussels, was an international group, featuring Simon Cox (assistant chief designer best known for designing the Lotus Elan's interior), Joji Yanaka, Andrew Hill and Nick Robinson. The task was to build a "lightweight but tough, fun but environmentally friendly" SUV.

== Specifications ==
The VehiCROSS shares many of its components with the Trooper, including both its 3.2 L and 3.5 L V6 engine that produces 215 bhp (160 kW; 218 PS) at 5400 rpm and 230 lb⋅ft (312 N⋅m) of torque at 3000 rpm. The vehicle also features the Torque on Demand (TOD) 4-wheel-drive system produced by BorgWarner.

The VehiCROSS combined a computer-controlled AWD system for on-road driving and a low-gear 4WD system for off-road driving. The Japanese version offered a 2WD non TOD or 4WD TOD option. The US-only constant 4WD TOD, with 12 independent sensors for detecting wheel spin and capable of redirecting power to the wheels with the most traction, gives the VehiCROSS a high level of traction on wet and icy roads. It also has a high level of performance for its height. While possessing on-road nimbleness, its body-on-frame truck construction, suspension and 4WD gearing make it very capable off-road.

Sales were intentionally limited, with only 5,958 vehicles being produced between 1997 and 2001; 1,805 were produced for the domestic Japanese market and the remaining 4,153 sold in the United States. It appears that Isuzu revisited a limited production approach they used in the mid-1960s with the dramatic 117 Coupe and the later Isuzu Piazza to produce an exclusive two door vehicle.

== Manufacturing ==
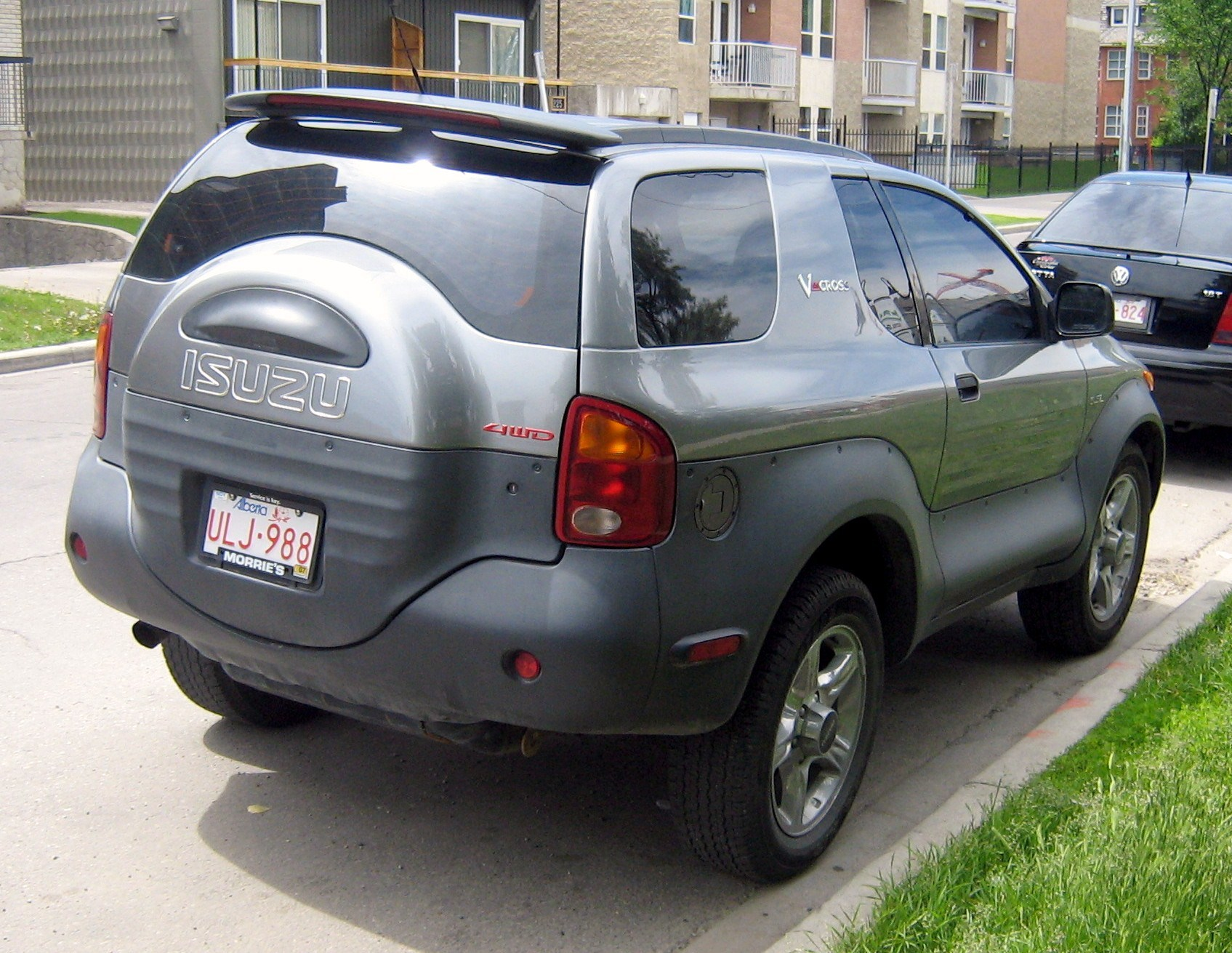
Isuzu VehiCROSS rear

The VehiCROSS was originally unveiled as a concept vehicle at the 1993 Tokyo International Auto Show. Its ultimate Japanese production release in 1997 was notable in that the production vehicle arrived with very few design changes and in a very short time. This feat was accomplished through the use of inexpensive ceramic body-stamping dies and the reuse of readily-available Isuzu parts. The truck was intended to showcase Isuzu's off-road technology, and is one of the few vehicles to ship with monotube shocks with external heat-expansion chambers, a technology normally reserved for off-road motorcycle racing.

== Recognitions ==
The VehiCROSS's design won the 1999 Russian Spirit of Time Award by the Russian Design Confederation (presented to Isuzu at the 1999 Russian International Motor Show).

Motor Trend featured the VehiCROSS on its May 1999 cover, and included it in its "Top 10 Sport Utilities" for Most Unique Styling.

Four Wheeler featured the VehiCROSS as the "First Runner Up" for Four Wheeler of the Year in 2000 behind the Tahoe Z71; when pitted against: Chevrolet Tahoe Z71, GMC Yukon, Nissan Xterra, Ford Excursion and Mitsubishi Montero Sport. The VehiCROSS scored highest of all 6 Mechanically, for Trail Performance and Highway Performance.

== Derivative versions ==
Both a concept four-door version (VX-4) and a roadster (VX-O_{2}) were shown at the 2000 Los Angeles International Auto Show, but neither reached production. Both of these concepts were donated to the Petersen Automotive Museum in Los Angeles in late 2008. Both were later returned to Isuzu when the Petersen Museum renovated. Isuzu had to destroy the vehicles for legal reasons in 2017.

The VehiCROSS was also used by Austin Robot Technology as foundation for robotic VX in 2005-2007 DARPA Grand Challenge.

== Motorsport ==
The VehiCROSS won both the Stage 2 and 4 Class in the 1998 Paris–Granada–Dakar Rally, and was Class Winner for the 1999 Australian Safari Rally.
