= Isuzu 4200R =

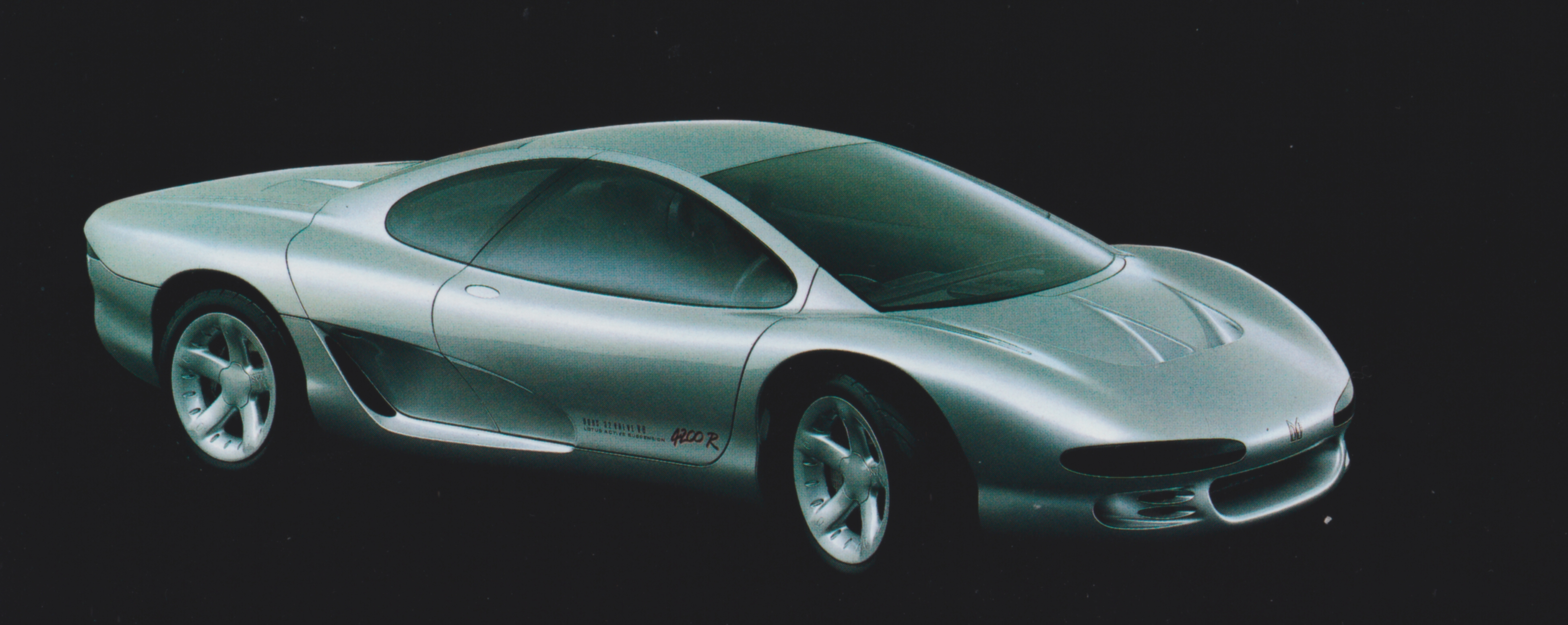
- Isuzu 4200R Concept

Overview
- Manufacturer: Isuzu
- Model years: 1989
- Designer: Shiro Nakamura; Julian Thompson; Simon Cox (interior)

Body and chassis
- Class: Sports concept car
- Body style: 4-door 2+2 coupé
- Layout: Mid-engine, four-wheel-drive layout

Powertrain
- Engine: Isuzu 4.2-litre (4,200 cc) V8 DOHC 32-valve
- Transmission: 5-speed manual

Dimensions
- Wheelbase: 105.9 in (2,690 mm)
- Length: 182.3 in (4,630 mm)
- Width: 75.2 in (1,910 mm)
- Height: 53.1 in (1,349 mm)

The Isuzu 4200R was a mid-engine concept sports car that Isuzu displayed at the 1989 Tokyo Motor Show. The development theme was the establishment of a sporty performance and image, in a traditional European taste. Lotus and Isuzu were connected at the time, both being in the GM group, and Shirō Nakamura, who was with Isuzu at the time (later moving to Nissan) worked together with designer Julian Thompson from Lotus to design the 4200R.

== Features ==
The 4200R was designed to be a mid-engine sports car which could also accommodate two adults and two children and to be practical enough to use for long drives. For this reason, the 4200R features a 4-door design, with smaller rear doors that slide backwards to allow entry into the back seats. The transversely mounted engine was Isuzu's newly developed 4.2 L, DOHC 32-valve V8 engine producing 350 hp, which was sent to all 4 wheels. The 4200R had active suspension developed in conjunction with Lotus which balanced both control stability and ride quality. The interior featured a number of technologies, such as a satellite navigation system, a video tape deck, a high performance audio system, and a fax machine.

Isuzu also prototyped a 3.5L V12 DOHC engine, and performed test drives with it mounted in a Lotus F1. Isuzu went on to mount this engine in a mid-engine, multipurpose vehicle, the Isuzu Como F1 concept, and displayed it at the Tokyo Motor show of the same year.

== Fate ==
However, in 1993, Isuzu ceased the development and manufacture of all small passenger cars, and has focused only on commercial vehicles since 2002. The concept car was dismantled around 1993, when Isuzu were to exit the small passenger car market. The car would however be digitally recreated for Gran Turismo 5 in 2010.

== Gallery ==
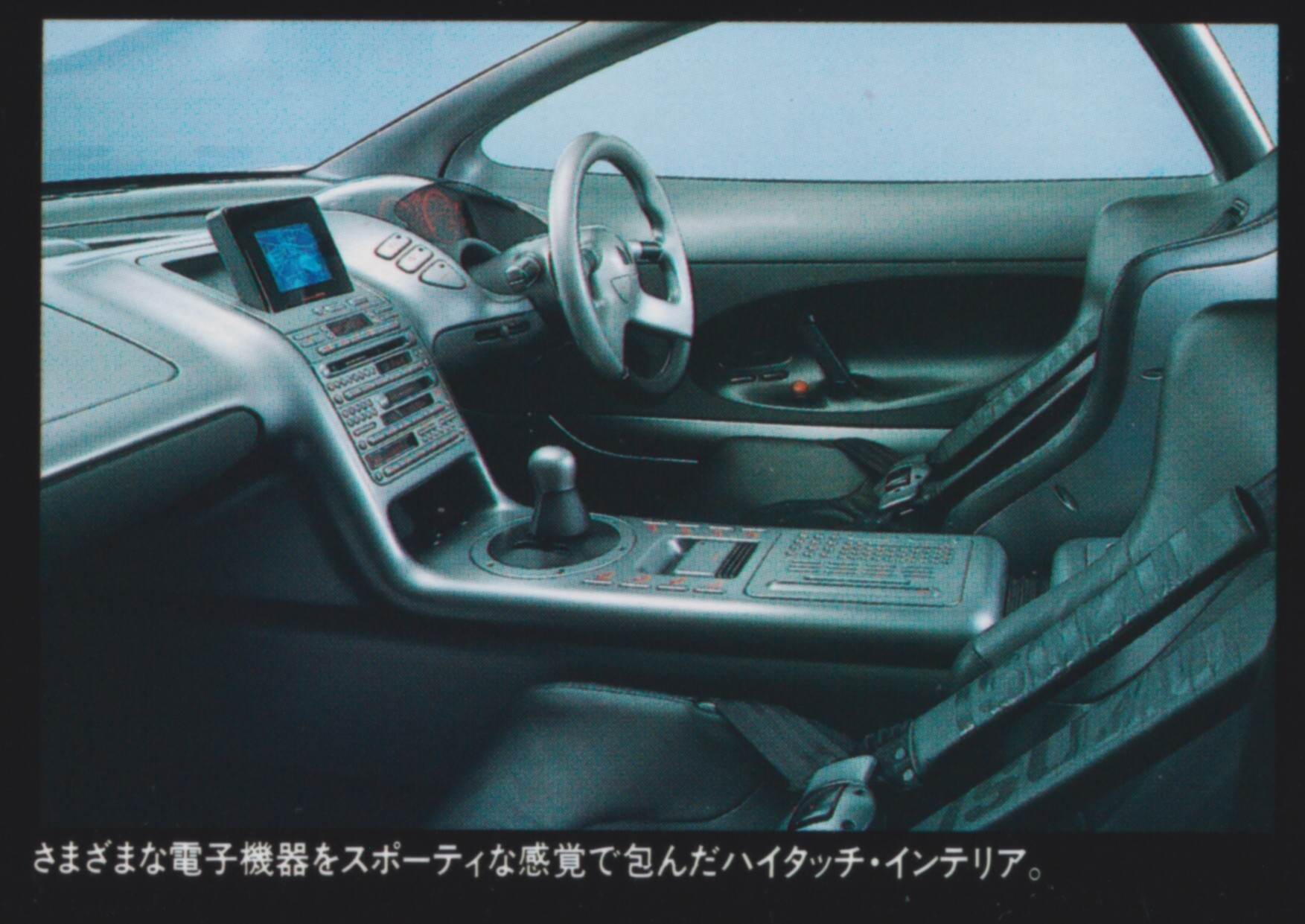
Interior

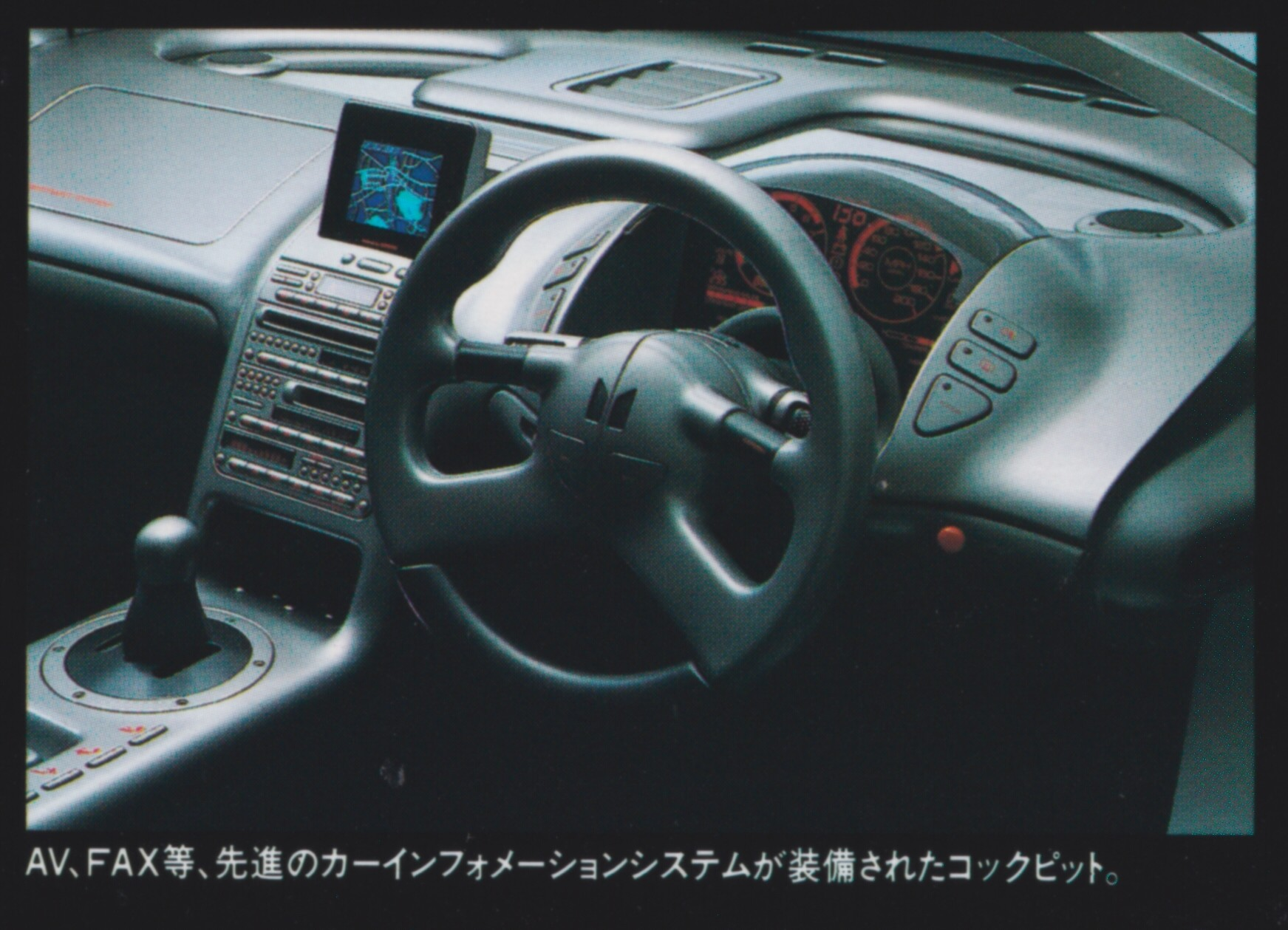
Interior

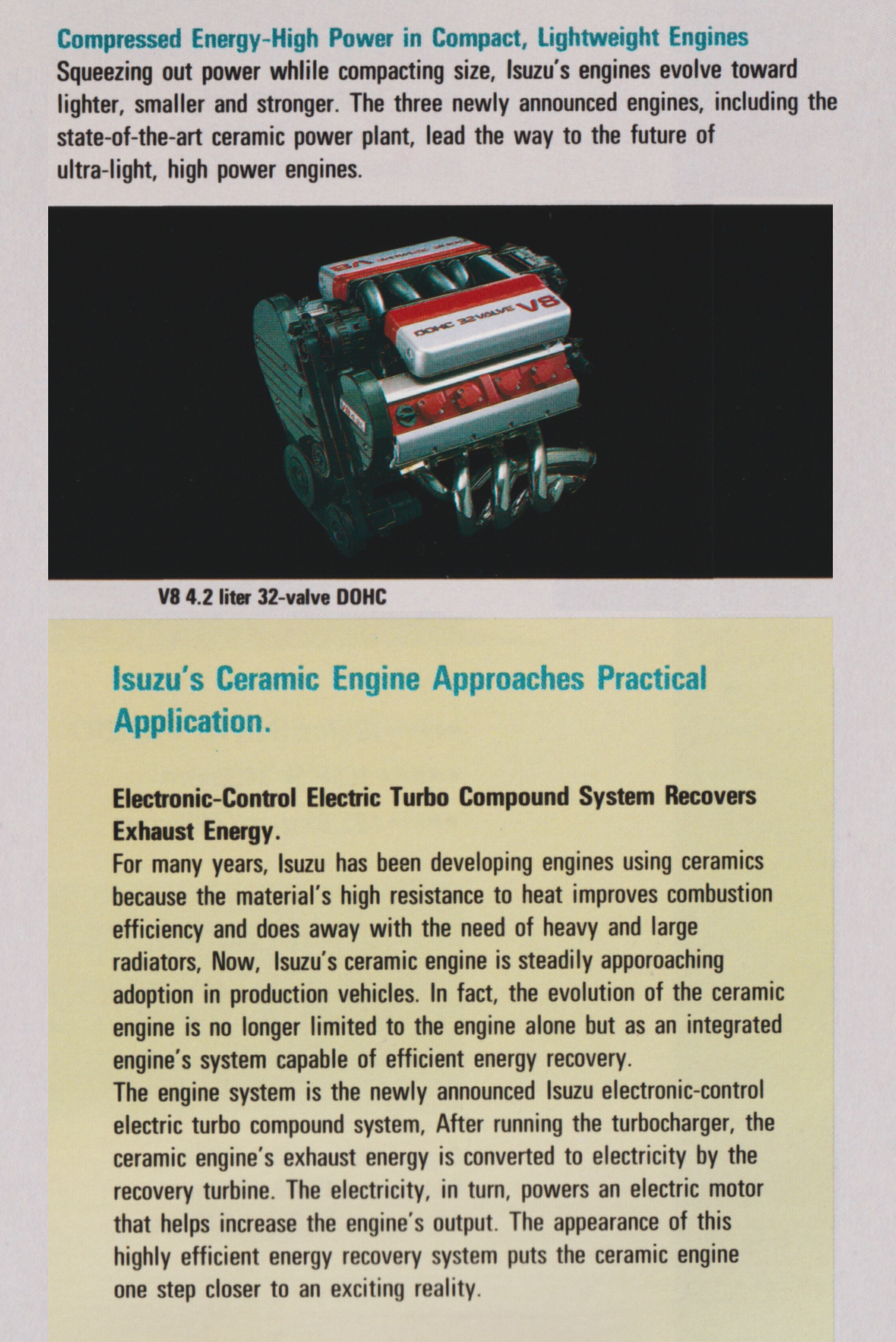
Isuzu 4.2L V8 ceramic engine
