= Isuzu Piazza =

Small, sporty 3-door liftback coupé which was manufactured by Isuzu

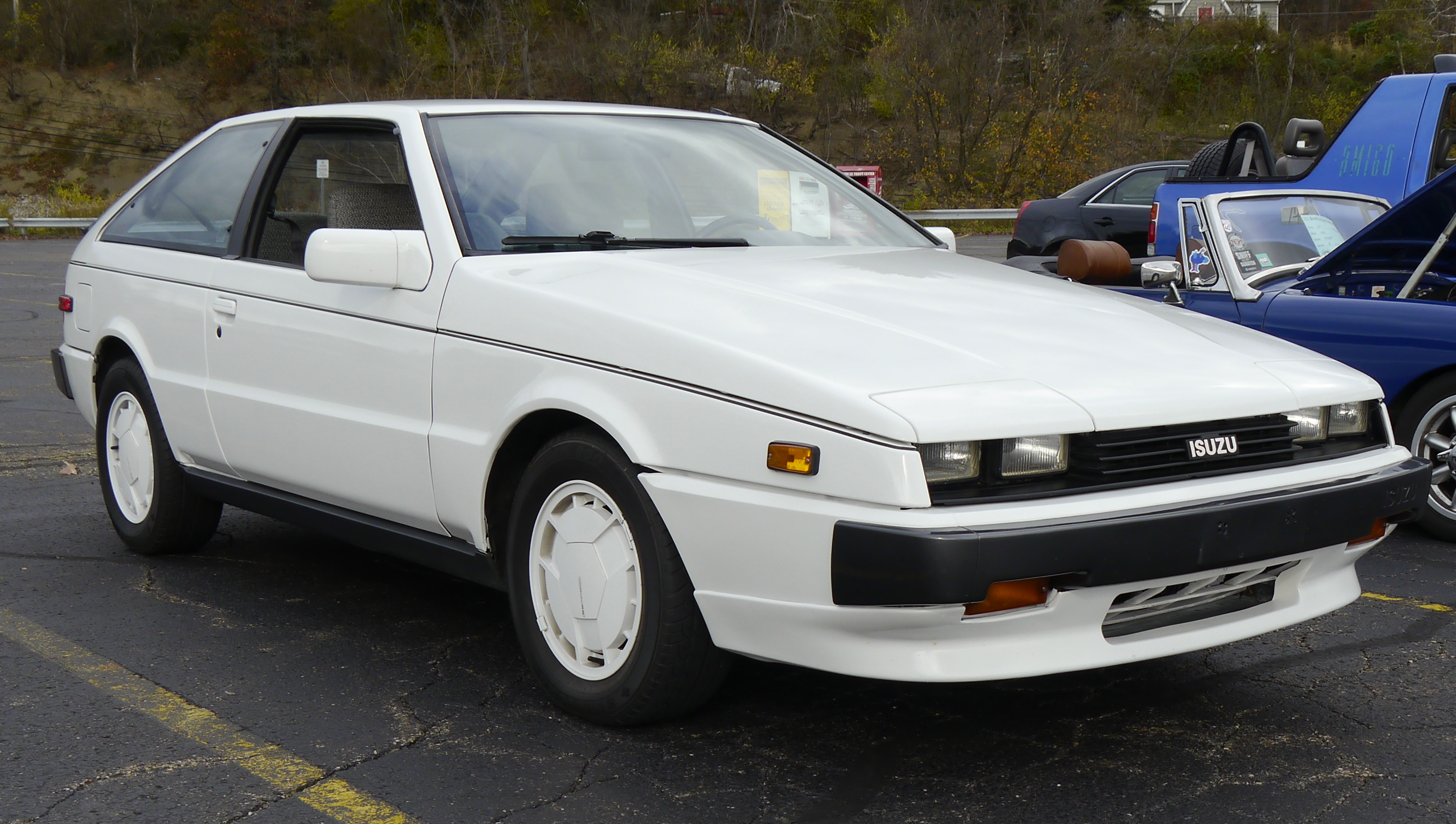
- 1987 Isuzu Impulse RS Turbo in the US

Overview
- Manufacturer: Isuzu
- Production: June 1981 – December 1993
- Assembly: Japan: Kawasaki, Kanagawa (Kawasaki Plant)

Body and chassis
- Class: Sports car

Chronology
- Predecessor: Isuzu 117 Coupé

The Isuzu Piazza is a small, sporty 3-door liftback coupé which was manufactured by Isuzu from 1981–1993 across two generations, marketed also as the Isuzu Impulse in North America and as the Holden Piazza in Australia.

The first generation Piazza used rear-wheel drive and in the United Kingdom it was the first widely available Isuzu passenger car. The second generation used front-wheel drive or all-wheel drive, and was marketed as the lower-priced Gemini Coupé and as the Geo Storm in the US market.

As of 2010, the number of registered Impulses in North America totaled only 2,300, making Impulses very rare.

== First generation (JR120/130; 1980) ==
First generation (JR120/130)
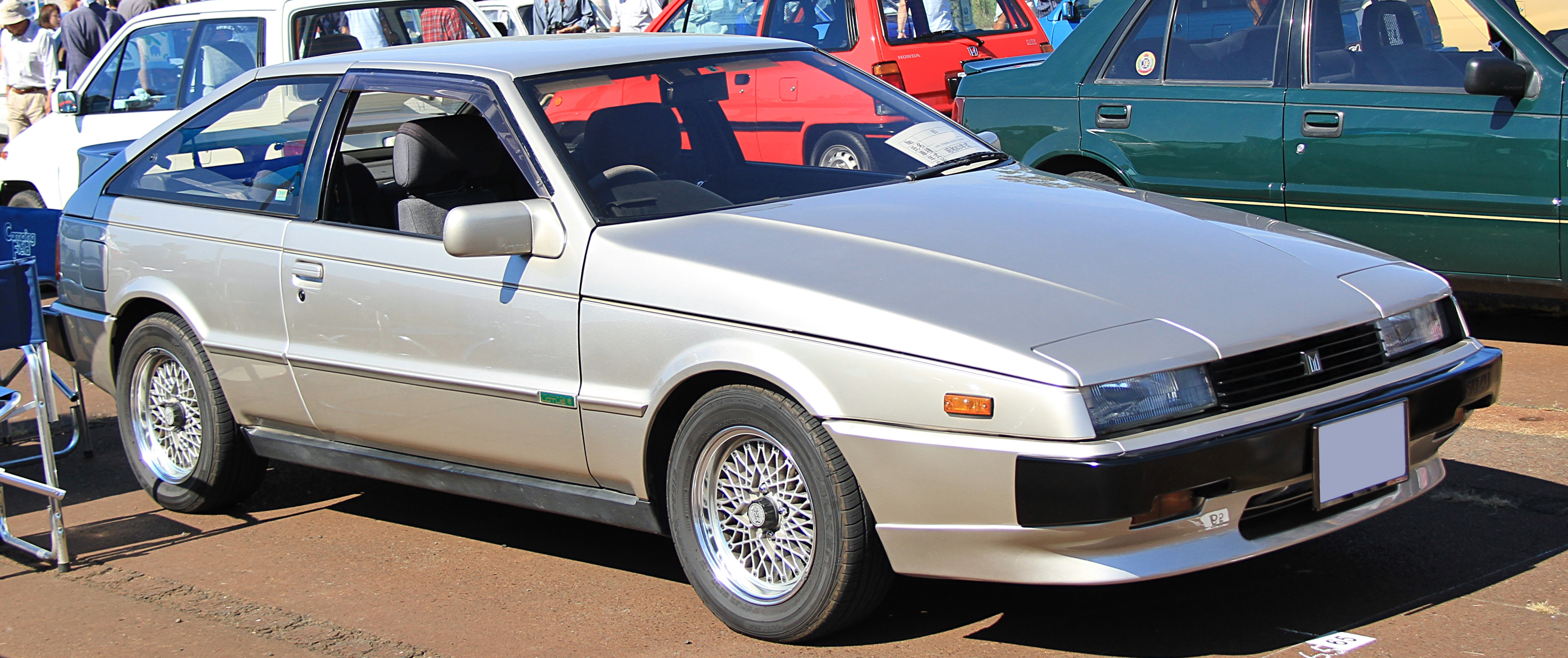
- 1988 Isuzu Piazza XE Handling by Lotus (Japan)

Overview
- Also called: Isuzu Impulse (North America); Holden Piazza (Australia)
- Production: June 1981 – July 1991; 113,419 units
- Designer: Giorgetto Giugiaro at Italdesign

Body and chassis
- Body style: 3-door liftback coupé
- Layout: Front-engine, rear-wheel-drive
- Related: Isuzu Gemini

Powertrain
- Engine: 1949 cc G200Z I4; 1949 cc G200WE DOHC I4; 1994 cc 4ZC1-T turbo I4; 2254 cc 4ZD1 I4 (US only)
- Transmission: 5-speed manual; 4-speed Aisin automatic

Dimensions
- Wheelbase: 2,440 mm (96.1 in)
- Length: Base: 4,385 mm (172.6 in); US, turbo: 4,385 mm (172.6 in)
- Width: Base: 1,655 mm (65.2 in)
- Height: 1,300 mm (51.2 in)

Chronology
- Successor: Holden Calibra (Australia)

In 1978, Isuzu commissioned Giorgetto Giugiaro to design a new sporty car to replace the 117 Coupe (also a Giugiaro design). They delivered several T Series Chevettes (developed in 1973 in South America) to the Italdesign studio in Italy and allowed Giugiaro free rein over the design. The result of this effort was the wedge-shaped three-door hatchback called the Asso di Fiori ("Ace of Clubs") prototype and show car. It was shown at the 1979 Tokyo Motor Show to rave reviews. Giugiaro referred to the design as his fifth "Copernican revolution", integrating the design innovations of many different previous designs into one, mass producible, vehicle. Within 48 hours of its unveiling at the Tokyo Motor Show, Isuzu fast-tracked the vehicle into production with minimal changes to the design. Items that remained included the single blade front windshield wiper, and an integrated steering wheel adjustment that also moved the instrument cluster, with wiper controls and exterior lighting controls installed just behind the steering wheel on either side, a feature that later appeared on the Ford Probe.

The first Piazza was assembled in September 1980 in Fujisawa, Japan. It was initially available with either a 120 PS (88 kW), 16.5 kg⋅m (162 N⋅m; 119 lb⋅ft) 2.0 L SOHC inline-four MPFI engine, a carryover from the Isuzu 117 Coupé, or a 135 PS (99 kW), 17.0 kg⋅m (167 N⋅m; 123 lb⋅ft) 1.9-litre DOHC MPFI I4 engine, with the DOHC introducing Isuzu's I-TEC (Isuzu Total Electronic Control System) engine control unit. as well as front double wishbone suspension. A five-speed manual and 4-speed automatic transmissions were available, and all models were rear-wheel drive. In April 1984, a 180 PS (132 kW), 185 lb⋅ft (251 N⋅m) turbocharged SOHC I4 engine was introduced, and the DOHC naturally aspirated engine was phased out in years that followed.

Piazzas were available in a multitude of trim levels including Bella, XN, XS, XJ, XE, XG, and Nero. The Piazza Nero models were exclusively sold at Yanase dealerships. By 1986, Piazzas tuned by Irmscher were offered alongside the Aska and Gemini. Towards the end of production, there were three different suspension tuning levels: Standard, Irmscher, and Lotus. Production of the 1st generation Piazza concluded in July 1991.

=== United States ===
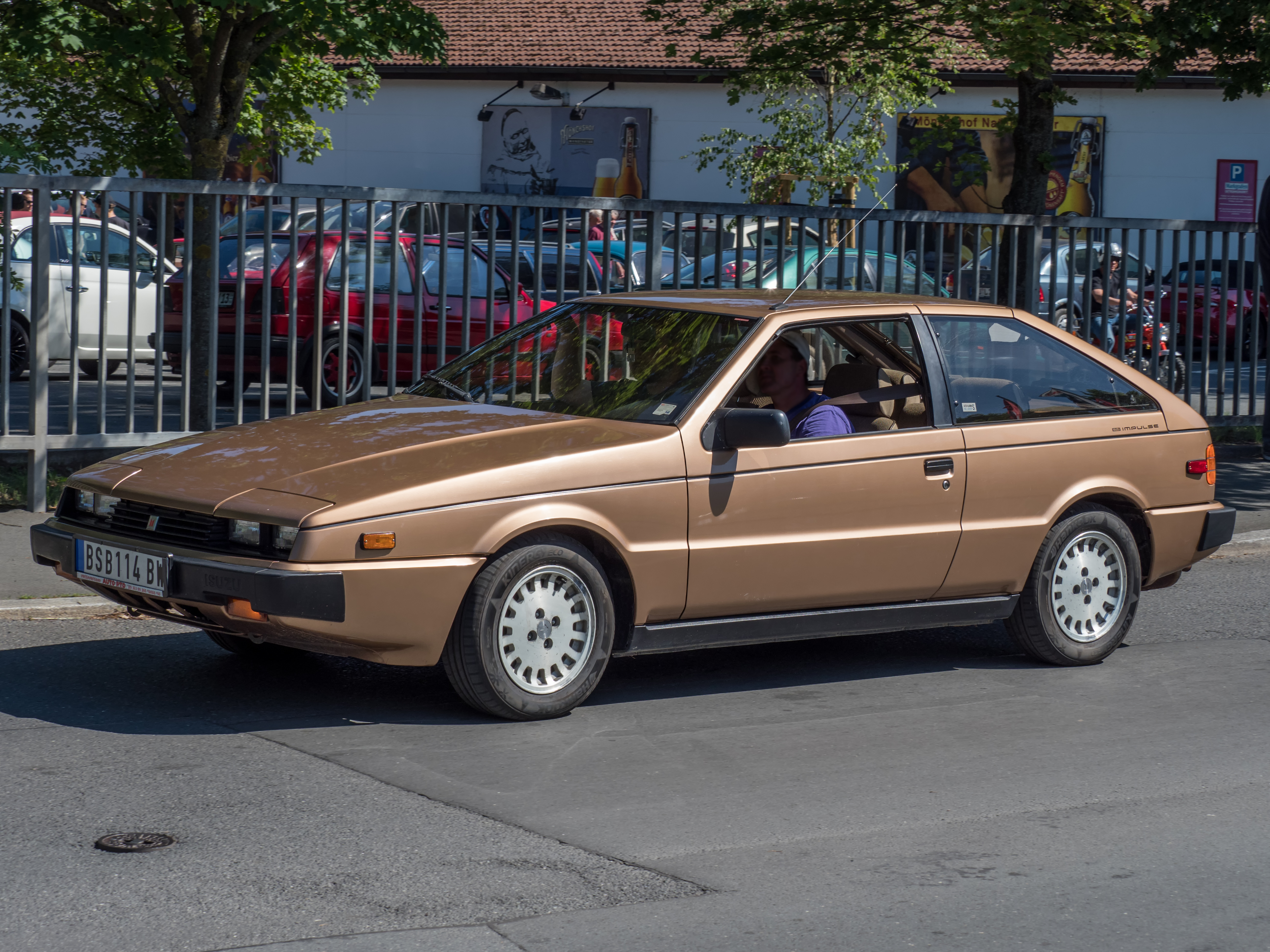
A 1985 Isuzu Impulse in Germany

In March 1982, a Piazza belonging to the General Motors Technical Center was previewed in Car and Driver magazine. For the US market, the Piazza was renamed and introduced as the Impulse in 1983. For the 1983 and 1984 model years, only one engine was available, the 2.0 L SOHC inline-four engine, rated at 90 hp (67 kW), 108 lb⋅ft (146 N⋅m). A MPFI turbocharged model was introduced in 1985, with a 2.0 L SOHC engine rated at 140 hp (104 kW) and 166 lb⋅ft (225 N⋅m). The 1987 model year had the RS model which came with a 4ZC1 turbo engine. The 1988 model year saw several changes. Mild exterior and interior changes were made to the appearance of the vehicle (including a larger rear spoiler and fixed headlights without pop up covers).

The 2.0L non-turbo engine was replaced with a 2.3-liter version, rated at 110 hp (82 kW) and 127 lb⋅ft (172 N⋅m) of torque. The 2.3 L engine was offered only in the US market, because the larger engine would have required Japanese consumers to pay a higher annual road tax, thereby affecting sales. In addition, the larger engine conflicted with Japanese government regulations concerning maximum displacement for cars classified as "compact". Beginning in the 1988 model year, all Impulses received a Lotus-tuned suspension, which consisted of redesigned sway bars, stiffer dampers, and a change in previous spring rates.

In the US market, Impulses were offered with only two trim levels: "Impulse" and "Turbo Impulse", with almost all equipment standard across both trims. However, certain model years included limited editions. Such as the 1984 Special Edition with gold wheels and trim and the RS from the 1987 model year. The latter was available only with a white exterior and wheels, a manual transmission, and a pewter-colored interior. As well as the stiffest suspension available on any Impulse, akin to the Irmscher suspension sold only in Japan. The base price for the RS was $14,639 USD (equivalent to $41,486 in 2025.) For the 1989 model year, a Special Edition non-turbo model was offered which was equipped with the Turbo model wheels and interior trim.

Performance of the Turbo model was comparable to the Mitsubishi Starion/Dodge Conquest, as demonstrated by the fact that the acceleration and handling numbers reported by the auto enthusiast magazines were within 0.1–0.2 seconds between the vehicles.

=== United Kingdom ===
In the UK, the Piazza was introduced in 1985 and sold in only one trim level, available only with a 147 bhp (110 kW), 2.0-litre turbocharged 4ZC1-T engine. Under a gentlemen's agreement to limit imports of Japanese cars to 11 percent of the overall market, Isuzu was limited to 600 examples for the first year. The Piazza was Isuzu's first entry into the Japanese market under their own name (some Isuzu light trucks had been sold with Bedford badging for years), although it was soon joined by the 4WD Trooper.

The Piazza had a shaky start in the UK with the first importer Isuzu GB, based in Maidstone, Kent going out of business in 1986, and London car dealer Alan Day bought the remaining stock of Piazzas at a bargain price. These cars were sold by Alan Day at significantly reduced price; the main reason Isuzu GB went out of business was due to high unit price. In 1987 International Motors Group of West Bromwich (IM Group) were awarded the official Isuzu franchise for the UK. (They also at the time represented Subaru and Hyundai in the UK.) IM Group still marketed the Piazza in single trim/engine form, but they only sold the updated 'Lotus' Piazza. The earlier cars sold by Day became known as 'pre-Lotus' cars; the suspension and handling of these pre-Lotus cars was derided by UK Press as poor, especially the live axle arrangement at the rear, which by the late 1980s was seen to be antiquated. The updated 'Handling by Lotus' car was available from 1987 and the handling, although keeping the live axle arrangement, was transformed by Lotus in the UK after significant development work, involving modified suspension layouts, larger brakes, specially produced dampers and Goodyear tyres. The 'Handling by Lotus' cars had updated interior and exterior equipment. The exterior having a redesigned rear, with a large 'hoop' spoiler, new rear lamps, new rear badging with 'Handling by Lotus' badges and removal of the rubber side bumper strakes for a cleaner, more modern look. The updated interior trim was mainly 'tweed' check fabric, an updated centre console, but the loss of air conditioning to keep the price down for the UK market.

Isuzu (UK) Ltd, the West Bromwich-based importer, sold the Lotus Piazza from 1987 to 1989, before concentrating on the 4WD Isuzu Trooper. They never sold the second generation Piazza in the UK, or in any other European market.

By 2019, only 15 Piazzas would remain on the UK's vehicle register.

=== Australia and New Zealand ===
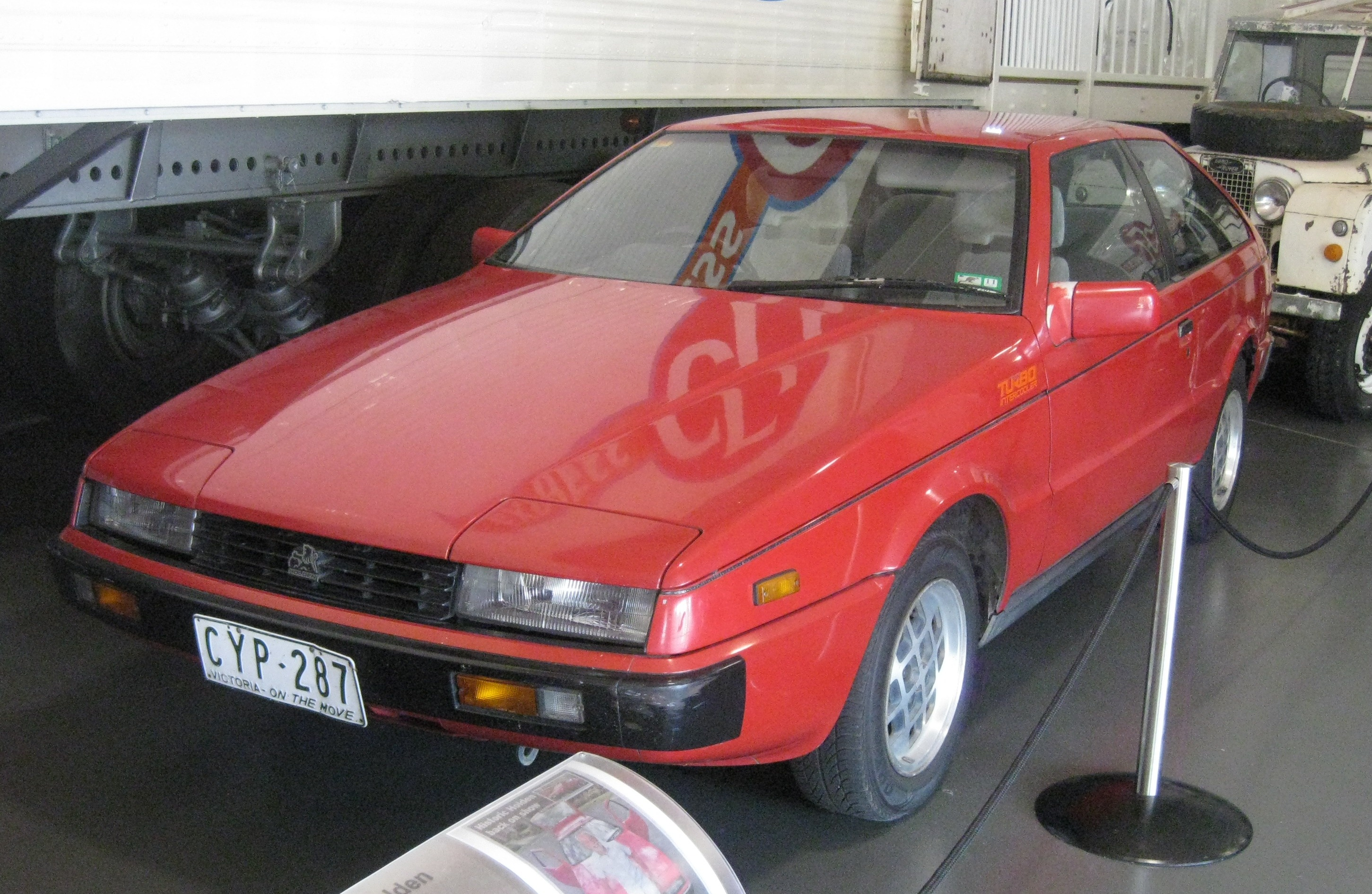
The Piazza was marketed in Australia as the Holden Piazza and was designated as the YB series

In 1982, the Isuzu Piazza was introduced in New Zealand. Only the non-turbo engine was offered.

In Australia, the Piazza was introduced in April 1986, and offered only in Turbo form. It was badged as the Holden Piazza. Its price of $35,000 AU$, late introduction on the market, and negative reception by the country's automotive press stymied the Piazza's success in Australia. Its MSRP being lowered to $29,000 did not increase sales, as a Holden Commodore Calais Turbo could still be had for less. The Holden Piazza was discontinued after only 379 examples were sold. In 1991, the Holden Piazza was succeeded by the Opel Vectra-based Holden Calibra.

=== In motorsport ===
During the 1983 All Japan Endurance Championship season, Orient Racing fielded a modified Piazza in the 500 km of Suzuka. The car would fail to complete the race.

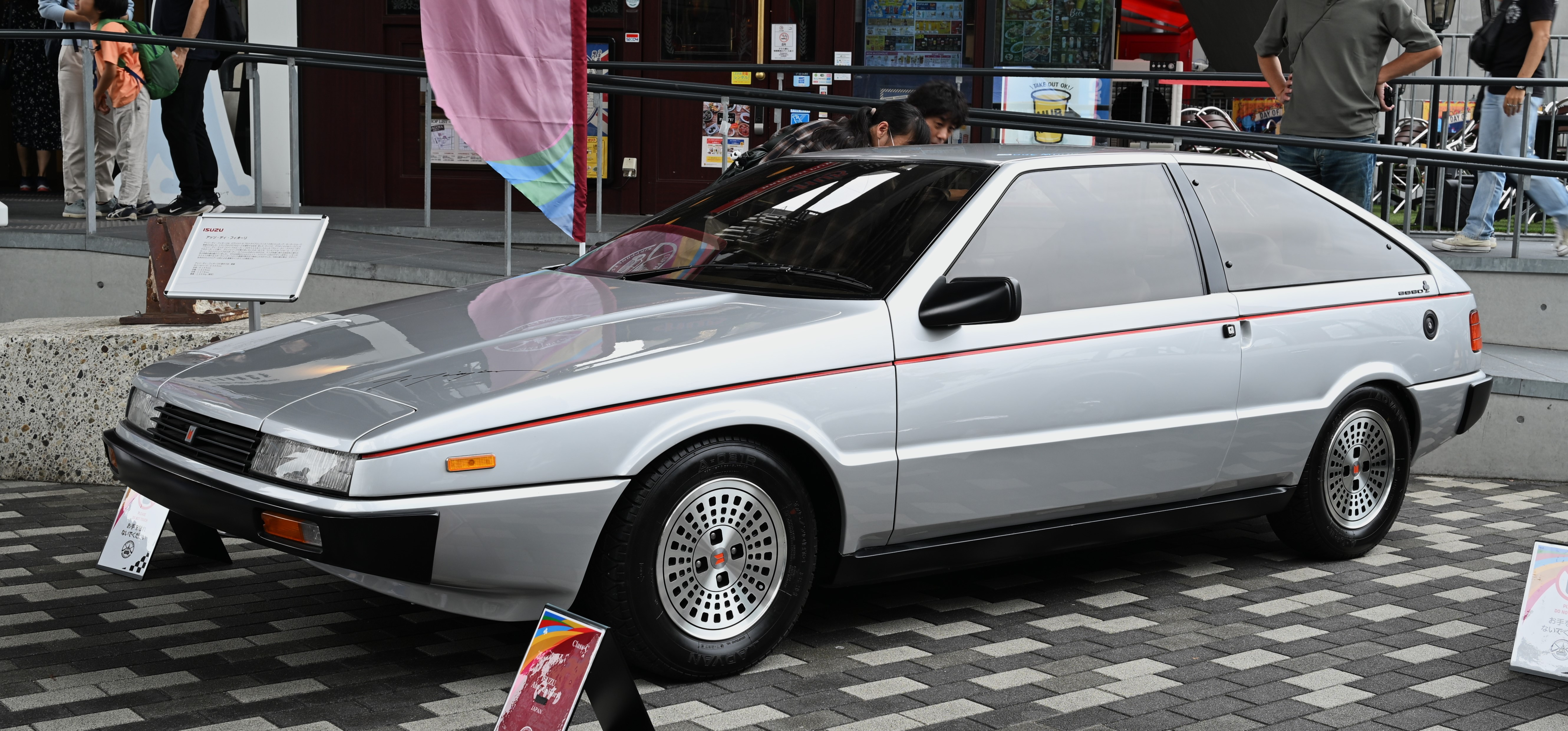
1979 Isuzu Asso di Fiori prototype

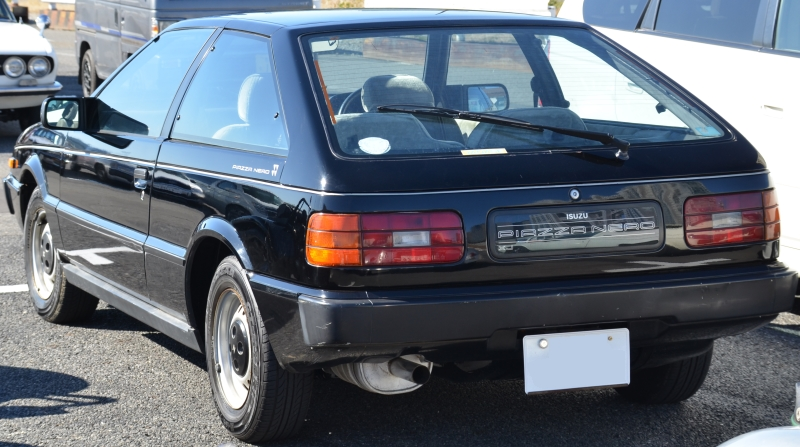
Piazza Nero XJ rear view

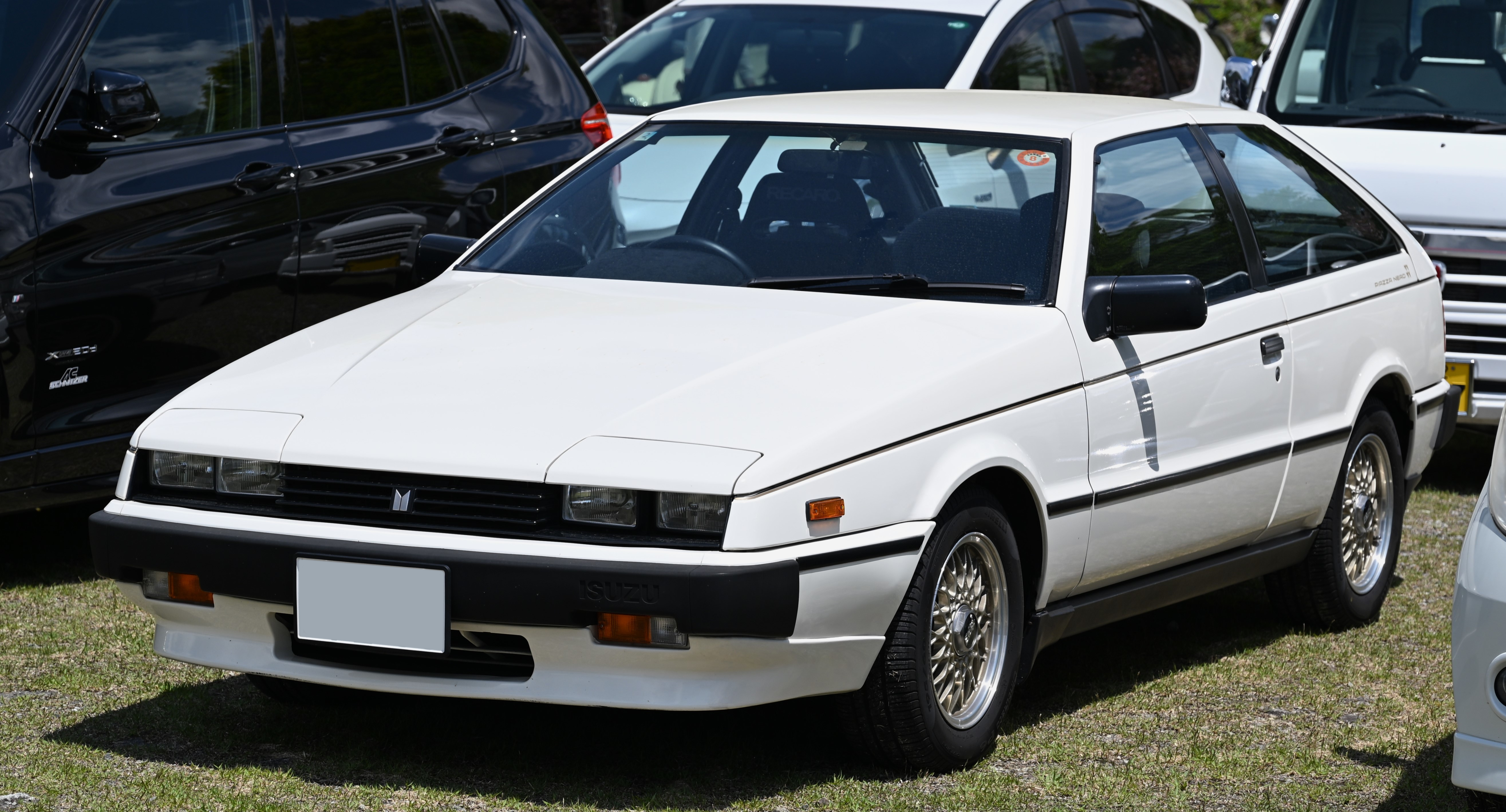
1984 Isuzu Piazza Nero XS

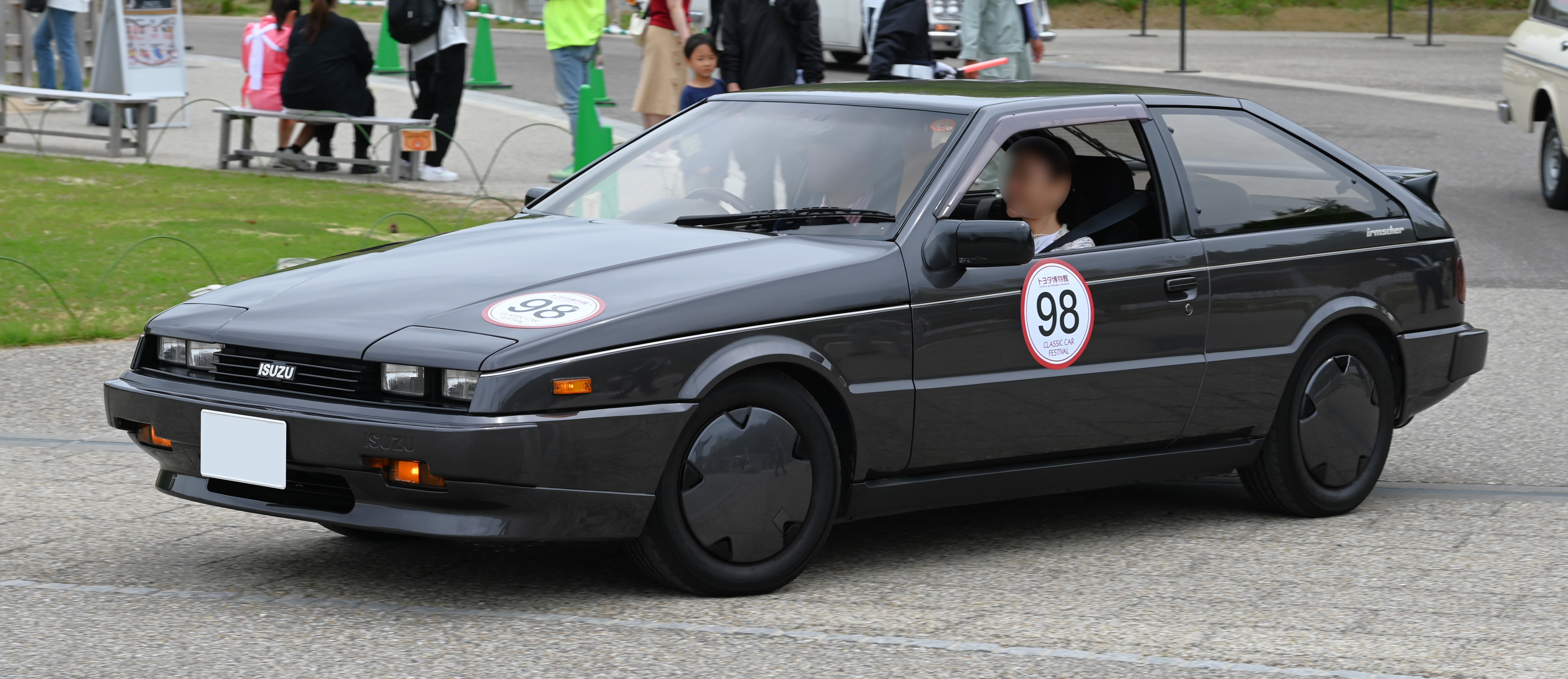
1989 Isuzu Piazza Irmscher

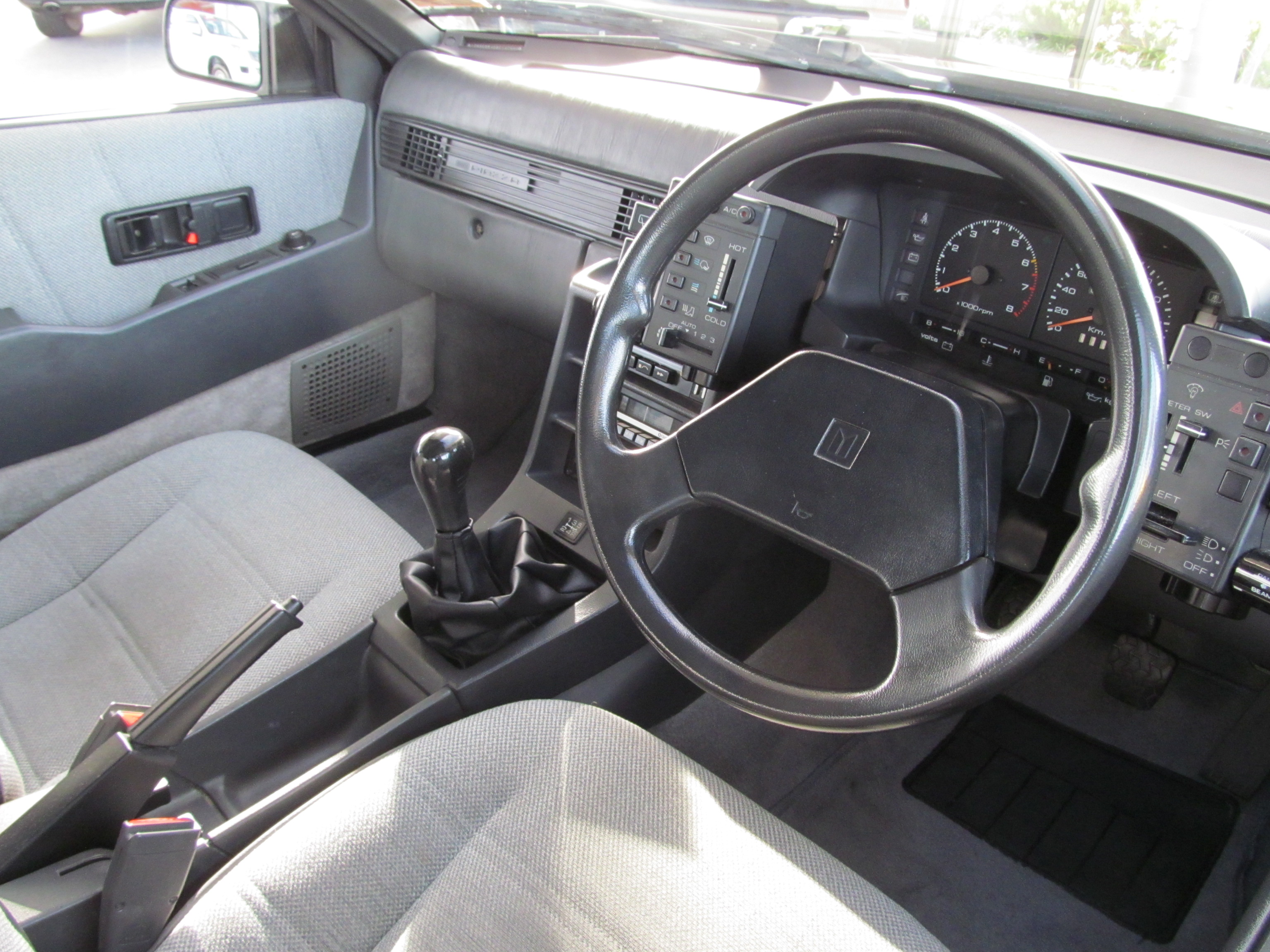
Piazza interior

== Second generation (JT22; 1991) ==
Second generation (JT22)
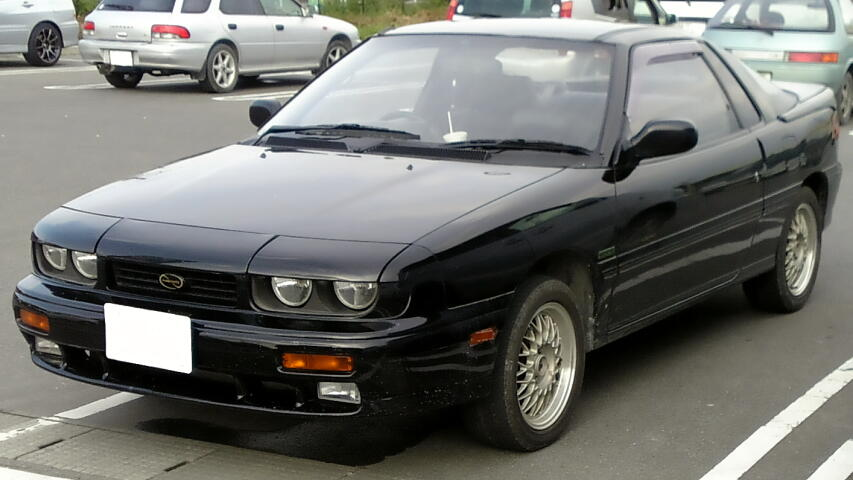
- Isuzu Piazza Nero (Japan)

Overview
- Also called: Asüna Sunfire (Canada); Isuzu Impulse (North America)
- Production: August 1991 – December 1993
- Designer: Shiro Nakamura

Body and chassis
- Body style: 3-door liftback coupé 3-door station wagon
- Layout: Front engine, front-wheel drive / four-wheel drive
- Related: Isuzu Gemini/Stylus; Geo Storm; Isuzu PA Nero

Powertrain
- Engine: 1.6 L 4XE1 DOHC I4 (US, Canada only); 1.6 L 4XE1W turbo DOHC I4; 1.8 L 4XF1 DOHC I4
- Transmission: 5-speed manual

Dimensions
- Wheelbase: 2,451 mm (96.5 in)
- Length: Base: 4,168 mm (164.1 in); 4,216 mm (166.0 in)
- Width: 1,694 mm (66.7 in)
- Height: Base: 1,313 mm (51.7 in); 1,298 mm (51.1 in)

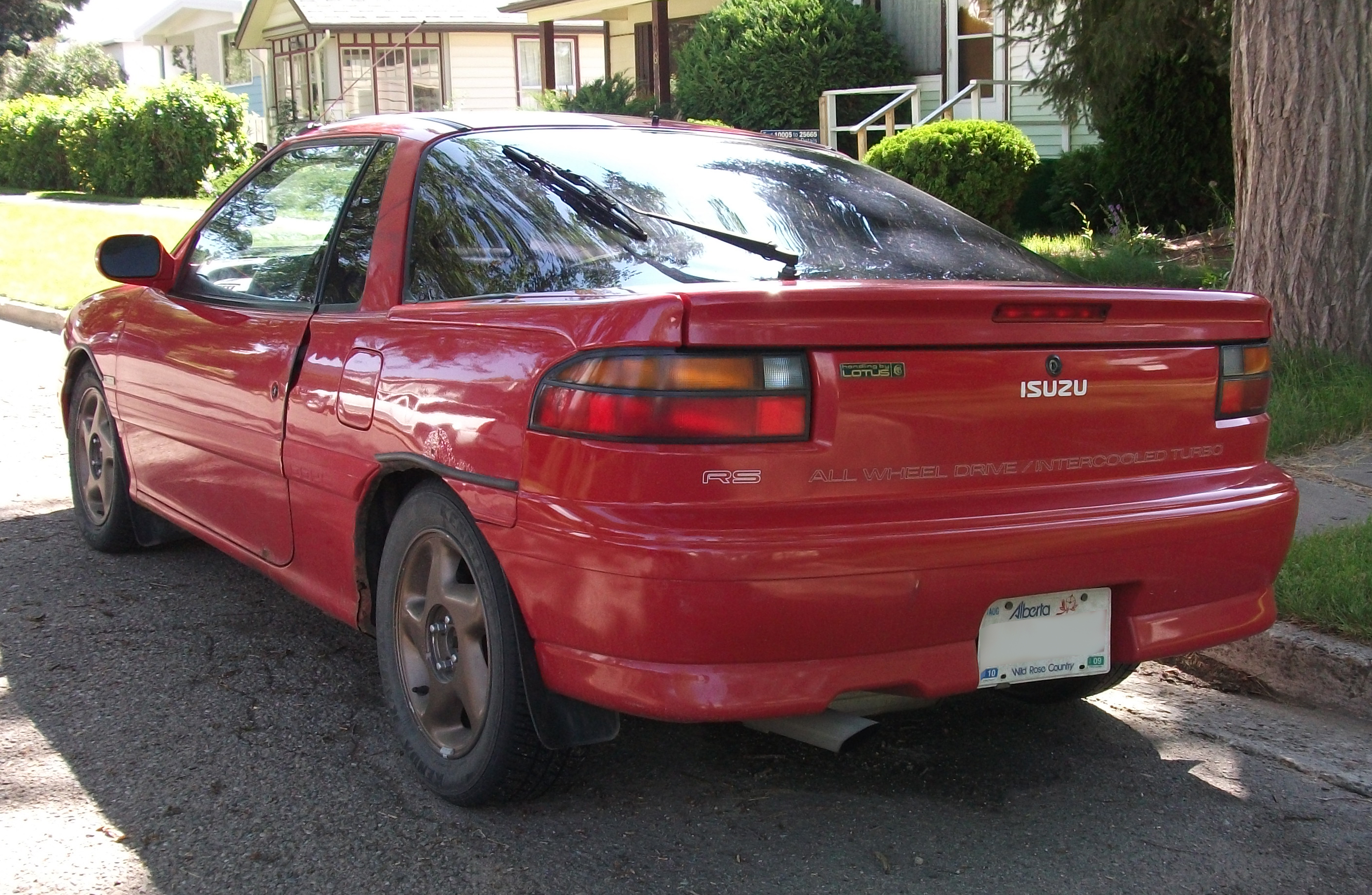
Isuzu Impulse RS Turbo, rear view (Canada)

The second generation Piazza/Impulse was designed on General Motors's second generation R-body "world car" platform. GM had commissioned Isuzu to build a replacement for the Spectrum, this time including a sportier model called the Storm (Gemini Coupé in Japan). The body design of the Storm was strongly influenced by GM and drew heavily from GM Europe's design submission for the Lotus Elan M100. Under Shiro Nakamura, Isuzu's then head of design, the third generation Gemini sedan was first designed on this platform, and then attention was turned to a sporty coupé to replace the first generation Impulse. Starting with the Storm, alternative front and rear treatments were made, retaining the "capsule" theme of the Gemini sedan, and drawing heavy influence from the rear-wheel drive Impulse (semi-concealed headlights with integrated grille as well as hood and taillight styling) while also expanding on the "European look", which later became a central point of marketing the vehicle in Japan.

In the United States, the three-door hatchback debuted as the Impulse XS in 1989 for the 1990 model year. It was offered only in front-wheel drive with a DOHC 1.6 L (1588 cc) inline-four engine which produced 130 hp (97 kW) and 102 lb·ft (138 Nm). The suspension consisted of MacPherson struts both front and rear, with a rigid trailing arm front suspension and a multi-link rear suspension, featuring Nishiboric passive steering. Because of labor shortages in Japan, however, the car was only ready for press introductions in March 1990 and went on sale shortly thereafter.

For the 1991 model year, the Impulse RS was introduced with a 160 hp (119 kW) and 150 lb·ft (203 Nm) turbocharged engine and all-wheel drive drivetrain which featured rear viscous differential and center planetary differential and viscous coupling. The wagonback model was also introduced for the 1991 model year, only available with the normally aspirated 1.6 L engine.

For the 1992 model year, the Turbo model was discontinued and the base engine was replaced with a 1.8 L (1809 cc) engine, sharing the same bore but with a longer stroke due to the taller engine block. This larger powerplant was good for 140 hp (104 kW) and 125 lb·ft (169 Nm). Both body styles continued into 1992, but very few were produced.

The second generation Impulse was produced in very low numbers, totaling slightly over 13,000 units, with that number including the production of the Isuzu Stylus. General Motors, who owned nearly half of Isuzu, also owned Lotus Cars at the time. Lotus selected the 1.6-litre engine and transmission from the Isuzu Gemini for the Lotus Elan M100 and a following generation of that engine eventually ended up in the Impulse. Lotus was subcontracted by Isuzu to fine-tune the suspension of the Impulse, through selection of stiffer dampers, larger sway bars, and softer springs. All of the second generation Impulses had the Lotus-tuned suspension.

A non-Lotus innovation in the Impulse was the development of the Nishiboric passive rear-wheel steering system which adjusted the toe of the rear wheels by changing the rear wheel alignment through the range of suspension travel.

The combination of the burst of the Japanese economic bubble, rising emissions and crash safety requirements, and continued restrictive market segment changes by General Motors forced Isuzu out of the car making market and brought an end to the Impulse.

In the Japanese market, this vehicle was sold as the Piazza from July 1991 through the spring of 1992. The second generation Piazza was offered only in front-wheel drive with the 1.8 L engine. All of the second generation Piazzas came with the Lotus-tuned suspension. The Japanese were also offered the Geo Storm version of the Piazza, called the Piazza PA-Nero. This model was exclusive to the Japanese import dealership network Yanase Co., Ltd., under a special arrangement that sold GM products in Japan.

In Canada, the same models, with minor variations, were sold in the 1990 and 1991 model years. No Impulses were made for Canada for the 1992 model year. In 1993 the 1.8 L model was sold in Canada as the Asüna Sunfire, but only with the hatchback body. With the phaseout of the Asüna brand in 1993, the Sunfire name moved to a Pontiac, as its version of the third-generation Chevrolet Cavalier on the GM J platform rather than an Isuzu platform.

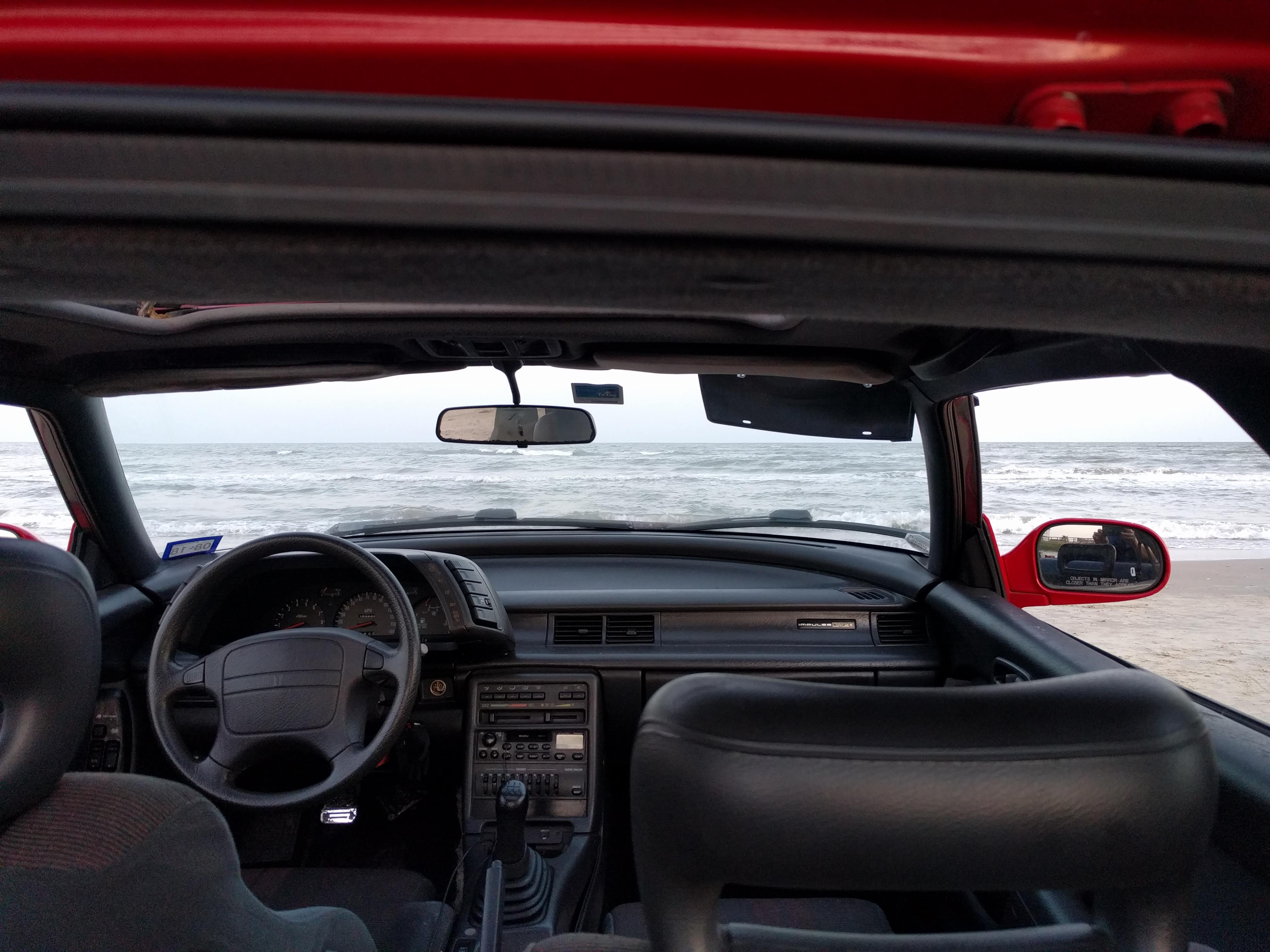
1991 Isuzu Impulse RS interior showcasing the "space capsule" design theme

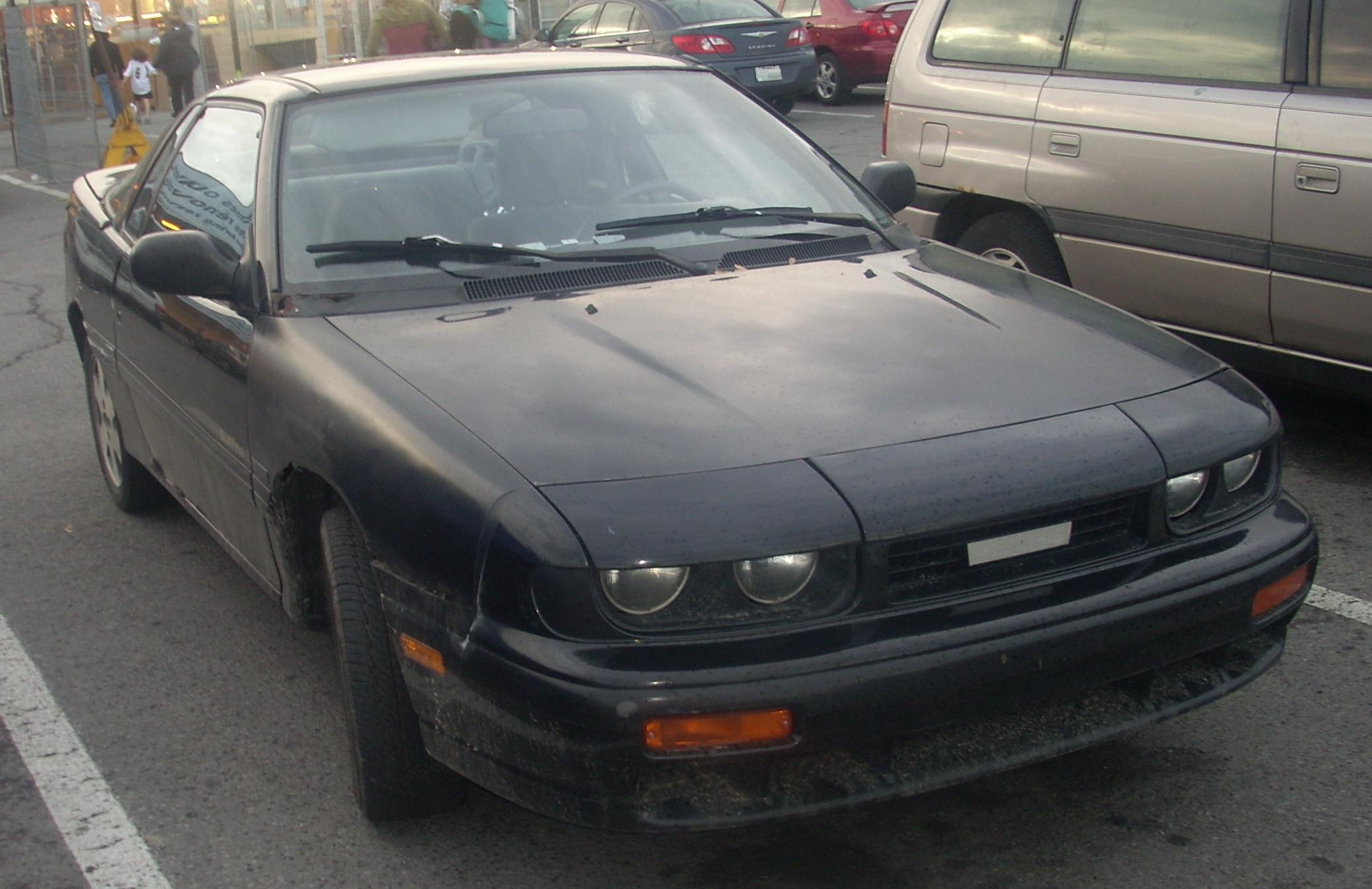
1993 Asüna Sunfire (Canada)
