= Buick Centieme =

Concept car developed by Buick

Overview
- Manufacturer: General Motors
- Designer: Bertone

Body and chassis
- Class: Concept car
- Body style: Crossover SUV
- Layout: Front-engine, four-wheel drive layout

Powertrain
- Engine: 3.6 L V6

The Buick Centieme is a concept car that was produced for the 2003 North American International Auto Show in Detroit by Buick. Its styling provided the basis for the later Buick Enclave show and production vehicles.

== Development ==
Borrowing from the French word for '100th', the Centieme was so named to commemorate the Buick Motor Division's 100th anniversary (compare the Cadillac Cien). The Centieme was similar is size and shape to the existing Rendezvous crossover, but lower, wider, and marginally longer. Power came from an experimental 400 hp (298 kW) 3.6 L twin-turbocharged V6 engine mated to the Hydra-Matic 4T65-E 4-speed transmission.

The Centieme was designed to showcase the possible direction of Buick interior styling. The entire interior - including the six captain's chairs - was upholstered in leathers of various grains and colors, including a woven-leather floor. The gauge cluster used aluminum accents with olive ash wood inserts for the trim. The interior featured ambient lighting.

The Bertone-designed exterior featured short front and rear overhangs, rode on 22-inch aluminum wheels, and was painted in Canyon Mist metallic tricoat.

== Legacy ==
Some of the Centieme's exterior design and interior features later showed up on the 2008 Buick Enclave crossover.

The Buick Centieme was sold by GM at a 2009 Barrett-Jackson auction in Scottsdale for US$29,700.
