= Simon Cox (car designer) =

British car designer

Simon Cox is a British car designer known for the Isuzu Vehicross, Cadillac Cien, Cadillac Converj, and the Opel Speedster.

He was sponsored by Ford Motor Company while at the RCA, but he elected to move to Lotus where he set up a new design studio. At Lotus he began producing several Lotus designs including the Lotus Esprit, Lotus Elan, and Isuzu 4200R concept launched at the Tokyo Motor Show in 1989. He then moved to Isuzu establishing a UK based design studio. Cox first came to notice in 1993 as creator of the left-field Isuzu Vehicross concept in 1995. This was followed by the Isuzu VX2 and the Isuzu Deseo Concepts.

Cox worked subsequently established another UK based Advanced Design studio for General Motors and operated as the Design Director. Here, the Cadillac Converj was created. This car was awarded the Design Excellence prize in the concept car category at the 2009 EyesOn Design Awards.

More recently, he has designed for McLaren and joined Infiniti, a Japanese luxury vehicle division, creating a new Advanced Design studio in Paddington, London, UK. He had had an automotive design career with companies such as Peugeot, Ford Motor Company, Lotus Engineering, Isuzu Motors, Nissan-Infiniti, Porsche, McLaren and General Motors.

He was designer for the Ligier JS P4 revealed at Le Mans 2016.

Simon Goodyear-Cox. MA MDES RCA FRSA FHEA. Assistant Professor in Transport Design Coventry University.

During his career he created four new Advanced Design studios in the U.K. where many influential and ground breaking Advanced SUV, MPV and Sports car concepts were created.

Race Car Designer for Revolution Race Cars 2017 500 EVO and 2026 Hypersport.
