= Cadillac Cien =

Concept car developed by Cadillac

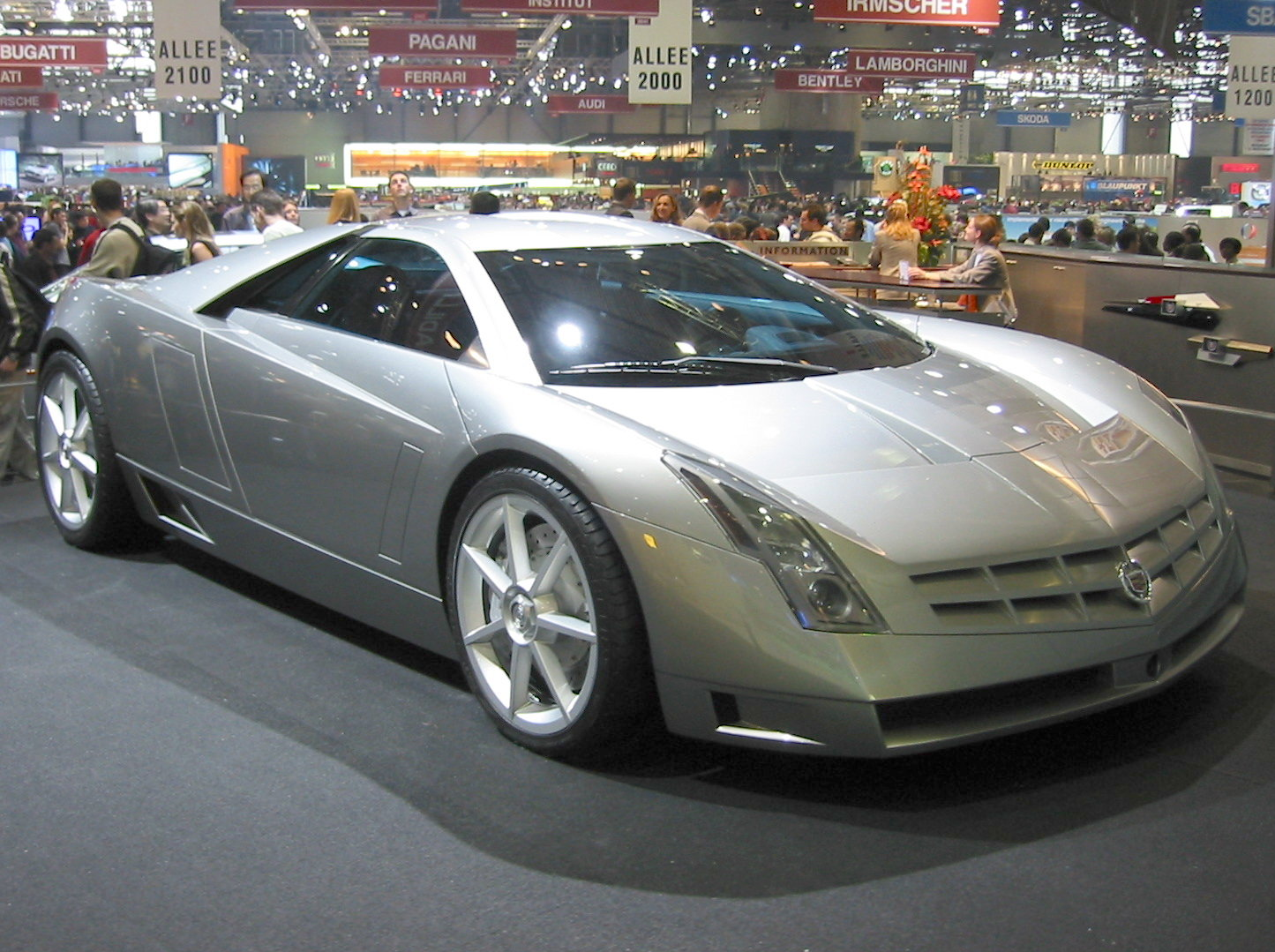

Overview
- Manufacturer: Cadillac (General Motors)
- Production: 2002 (Concept car)
- Designer: Simon Cox

Body and chassis
- Class: Concept sports car (S)
- Body style: 2-door coupé
- Layout: Rear mid-engine, rear-wheel-drive
- Doors: Scissor

Powertrain
- Engine: 7.5 L Northstar XV12
- Transmission: 6-speed automated manual with electronic paddle-shift

Dimensions
- Curb weight: 3,307 lb (1,500 kg)

The Cadillac Cien is a 2-door rear mid-engined, rear-wheel-drive concept car created by Cadillac, designed by Simon Cox, and unveiled at the 2002 Detroit Auto Show to celebrate Cadillac's 100th anniversary ("cien" is Spanish for one hundred, which compares the Buick Centieme).

== Overview ==
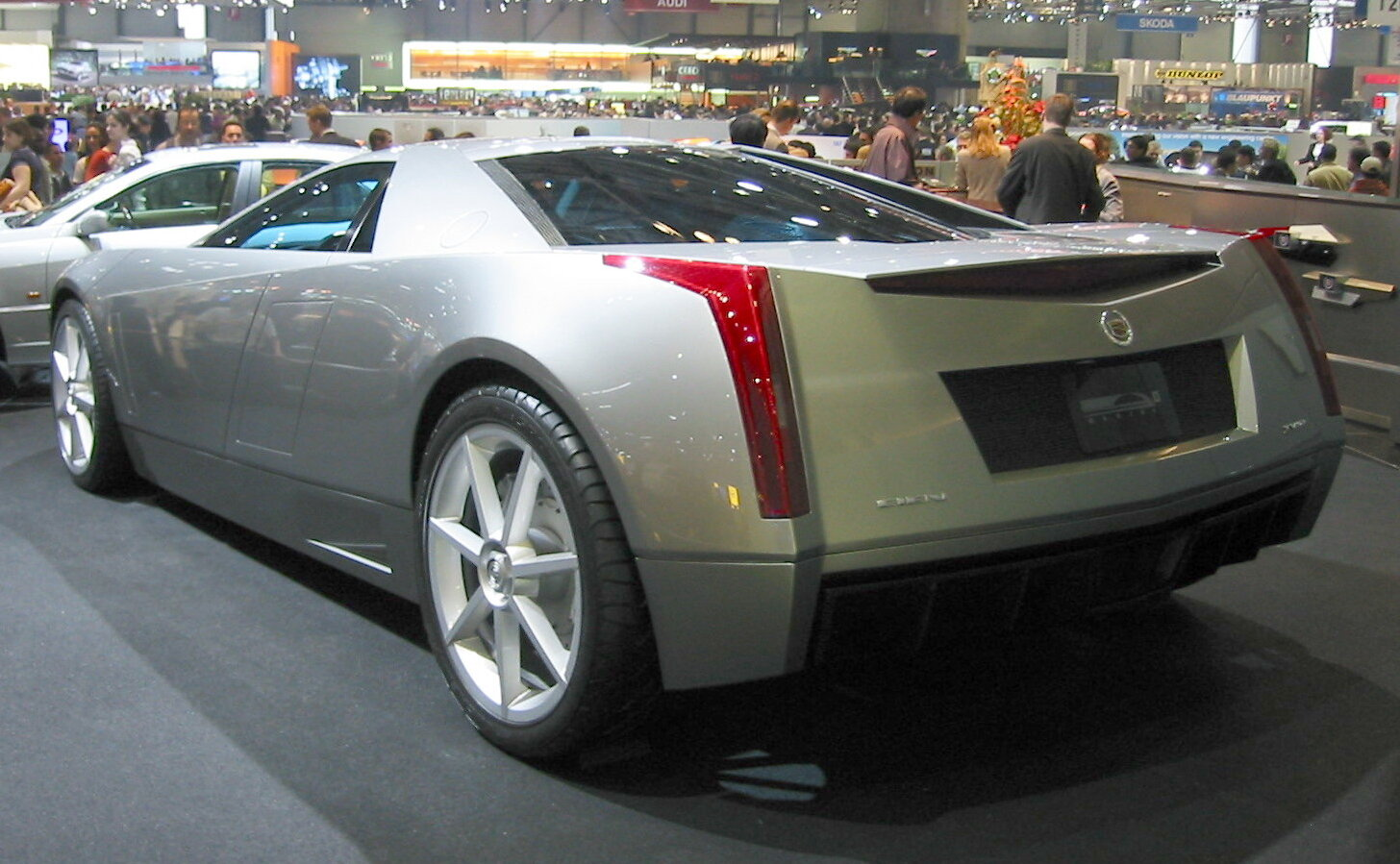
Cadillac Cien (3/4 rear view)

The Cadillac Cien has a longitudinally mounted 60-degree, 7.5-liter V12 that produces 750 hp (559 kW) and 650 lb⋅ft (881 N⋅m) of torque. The experimental engine features direct injection and displacement on demand, which allows the engine to run on only eight or fewer cylinders under light load. The Cien was designed at General Motors' Advanced Design Studio in England and built as a fully working road-going vehicle with the help of the UK-based engineering and motorsport company Prodrive. The Cien's monocoque chassis and body are made of aerogel composite and equipped with active aero. Its design was inspired by the F-22 Raptor.

Initially, there were plans to put it into production, but due to the lack of development funds and the high expected selling price of US$200,000, the existence of a customer base for the Cien was put into question. The production of the Cien was thus cancelled at a board meeting.

== In media ==
The Cadillac Cien was featured in the 2005 film The Island and was briefly seen in Transformers: Age of Extinction

The Cadillac Cien is a playable vehicle in video games including Gran Turismo, Midnight Club 3: DUB Edition Remix, and Asphalt Legends.
