= Shiro Nakamura =

Japanese car designer and business executive

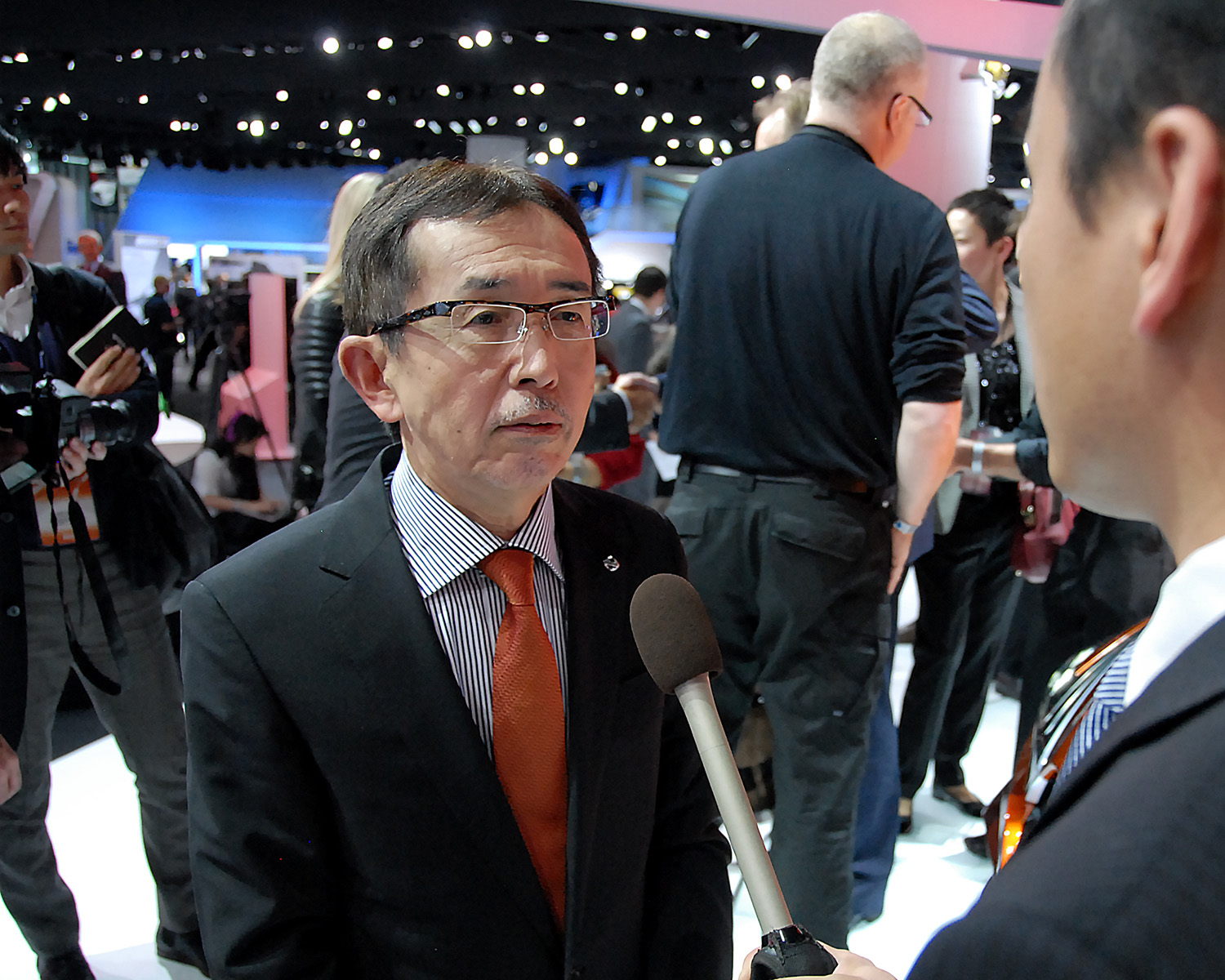
- Born: 17 October 1950 (age 75); Osaka, Japan
- Education: Musashino Art University, Tokyo and Art Center College of Design. Pasadena, CA
- Occupations: Senior Vice President and Chief Creative Officer of Nissan
- Employer: Nissan

Shiro Nakamura (中村 史郎, Nakamura Shirō; born 17 October 1950) is a former Japanese car designer and company executive. Nakamura served as Senior Vice President of Nissan Motor Co. Ltd. From 2006, Nakamura had been Nissan's Chief Creative Officer. He was Chief Creative Officer of Nissan, Infiniti and Datsun. Nakamura retired in 2017. Known as a hands-on creative, he goes by the nickname "Fingers".

== Biography ==
=== Early life ===
Nakamura was born in October 1950 in Osaka, Japan.

=== Education and academic achievements ===
Nakamura holds a Bachelor of Arts in industrial design from the Musashino Art University in Tokyo, Japan, along with a Bachelor of Science with distinction in Transportation Design from the Art Center College of Design in Pasadena, California.

=== Career ===
When Carlos Ghosn took charge of Nissan in 1999, he brought in Nakamura from Isuzu to lead the design part of Nissan's revival. According to the Forum for Corporate Communications in Tokyo, Nakamura "immediately exerted leadership in driving the design team to create distinctive and innovative designs based on Japanese traditional aesthetics and contemporary culture". Iconic cars, such as the Nissan Cube, Fairlady Z, GT-R, Murano, Qashqai, Juke and LEAF as well as Infiniti M, FX and Essence were created under Nakamura's guidance.

At Isuzu, Nakamura held various senior level positions, and was responsible for the design of models such as Isuzu VehiCROSS and Gemini. Nakamura started as a studio draftsman in 1974. In 1985, Nakamura joined General Motors and worked at the Advanced Design Studio in Michigan.

== Recognitions ==
Nakamura has received many awards for his work, among them the 2010 EyesOn Design Lifetime Achievement Award. In 2003, he was introduced into the Automotive News All Stars, Design. Nakamura was named by FastCompany Magazine the world's 4th most creative person of 2010, behind Lady Gaga, Eddy Cue, and Elizabeth Warren. He was the only car designer on that list. In 2014, Nakamura received the Art Center's Lifetime Achievement Alumni Award. In 2015, Nakamura was declared the winner of the "Grand Prix du Design" at the International Automobile Festival in Paris.

== Other interests ==
Nakamura plays the cello.
